= Asaba International Airport =

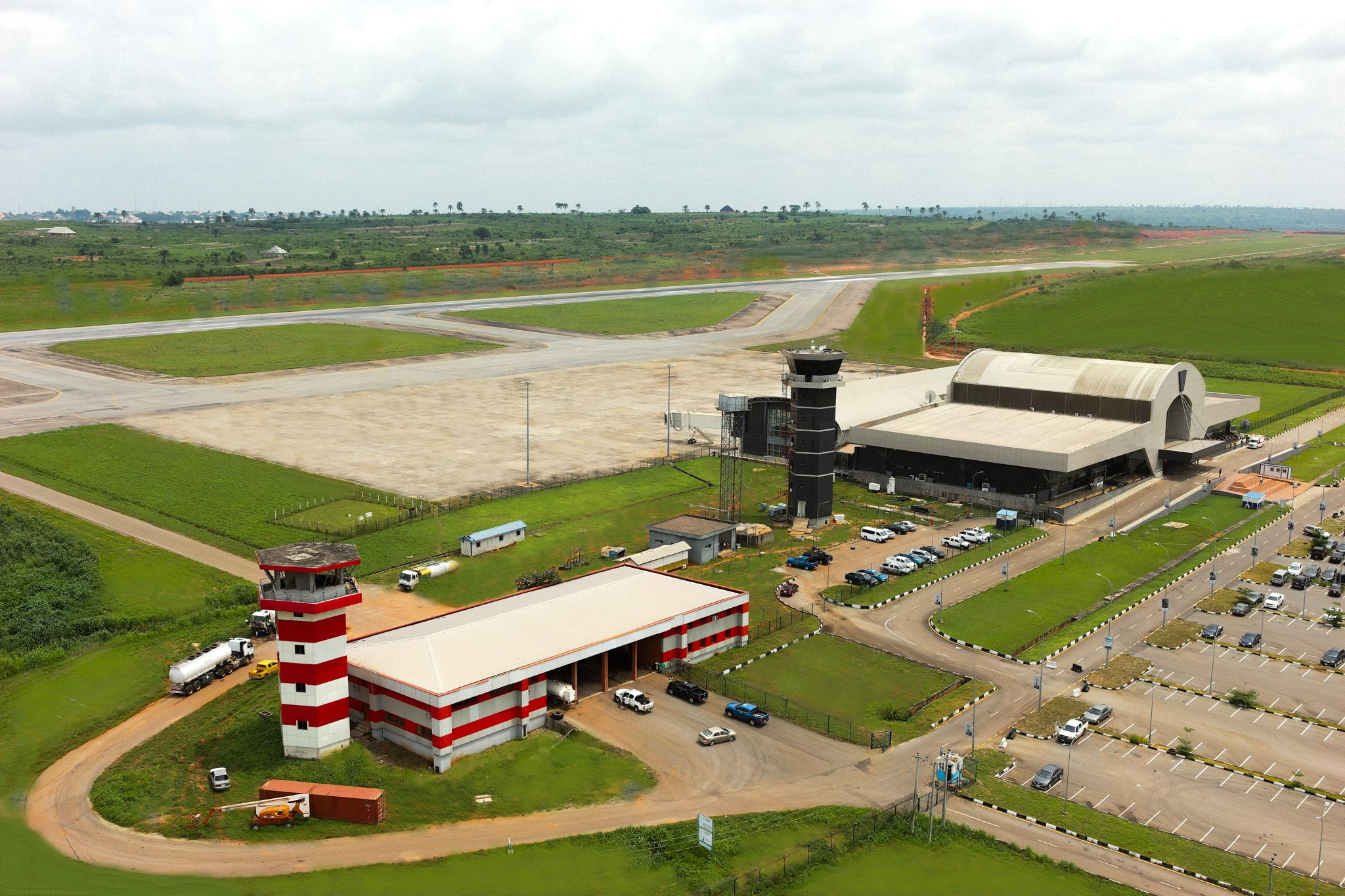
- Aerial view of Asaba International Airport
- IATA: ABB; ICAO: DNAS

Summary
- Airport type: Civil/Public/Midsize
- Operator: Asaba Airport Company
- Serves: Asaba, Nigeria
- Time zone: WAT (+1)
- Elevation AMSL: 305 ft (93 m)
- Coordinates: 6°12′15″N 6°39′55″E
- Website: https://asabaairport.com/

Map
- Location of Airport in Nigeria

Runways
Direction	Length		Surface
Direction	m	ft	Surface
11/29	3,400	11,155	Asphalt
- Sources: GCM Google Maps

Asaba International Airport (IATA: ABB ICAO: DNAS): is an international airport located in Asaba and the whole of the Delta State, Nigeria. Located approximately 7.9 kilometeres (4.9 mi) east of the city centre, the airport facilitates both domestic and regional air traffic within the southern region of Nigeria. It officially commenced operations on 13 July 2011.

Asaba airport connects the commercial cities of Lagos, Port Harcourt, Abuja, Kano and Onitsha. It also serves other cities within the South-East and South-South region and is regulated by the Nigeria Civil Aviation Authority. It was upgraded to Category 6 status in 2010. In April 2018, Asaba International Airport was temporarily closed to allow for facility upgrades. The airport reopened in June 2018, with Overland Airways resuming flight services on June 6, 2018.

In 2021, the Delta State Government ceded the management of the airport to Asaba Airport Company under a 30-year concession agreement.

== History ==
Asaba International Airport was initially conceptualized in 2007 during the administration of Chief James Onanefe Ibori (1999–2007). The overarching objective was to build a standard passenger and cargo airport infrastructure in Asaba, Delta State, capable of accommodating aircraft in categories C, D, and E, thereby serving as an additional revenue source for the state. Asaba was selected due to its strategic geographical position connecting the South-East and Niger-Delta regions. However, the Ibori administration did not embark on the project.

The subsequent administration of Dr. Emmanuel Uduaghan (2007–2015) initiated the construction of the airport, leading to its official opening on 13 July 2011. Despite the inauguration, the airport faced operational challenges, including infrastructural deficiencies that led to its downgrade by the Nigerian Civil Aviation Authority (NCAA) in 2015. These issues necessitated significant rehabilitation efforts.

Under the administration of Senator Dr. Ifeanyi Okowa (2015–2023), comprehensive rehabilitation work was undertaken.This included the construction of a new runway, installation of an instrument landing system (ILS), and field lighting to have the airport return to 24-hour operations. It was completed and the rehabilitation culminated in the airport's upgrade to Category 6 by the Nigerian Civil Aviation Authority (NCAA).

Following the completion of the facility upgrade, the Okowa administration commissioned a feasibility study, revealing that operating the airport at full capacity would be approximately 85% more expensive for the government to operate compared to a public-private partnership (PPP) model. Consequently, the Delta State Government decided to expand and modernize the airport facilities under a Private-Public Partnership arrangement.

== Concession ==
Following the upgrade of the airport facility and the government's intent to invite private sector participation, the Delta State Government issued a Request for Proposal to select a Transaction Adviser and in March 2016, Delta State Executive Council approved the appointment of HALCROW Infrastructure Consortium as the Transaction Adviser to the Government to midwife the concession of Asaba International Airport.

On 23 February 2021, Asaba Airport Company signed a 30-year concession agreement with the Delta State Government after a rigorous and transparent selection process.

=== Key highlights of the concession ===
- The concessionaire shall prepare a master Plan for the airport setting out the proposed development for the entire airport, planned over a 20-year time horizon.
- The Concessionaire shall commence a mandatory capital project development of the airport, which includes: Passenger Terminal Upgrade and Extension, Cargo Terminal, Aviation Fuel Terminal Upgrade, and a Business Park.

Upon the signing of the concession agreement, a Project Delivery Oversight Committee (PDOC) consisting of five members, including the Concessionaire Representative, two employees of the Concessionaire and two persons appointed by the Delta State Government, was established within 30 days of the execution of the agreement. The PDOC is responsible for ensuring that the terms of the concession agreement are duly satisfied, and it shall be the single point of contact for the Concessionaire for all matters concerning the agreement. The PDOC was also responsible for overseeing the six-month transition period.

The transition period ensured a seamless transfer of the operations and management of the airport to Asaba Airport Company. The handover of the management of Asaba International Airport to Asaba Airport Company was performed in a symbolic ceremony on 22 August 2021.

The Delta State Government is the vested owner of Asaba International Airport ad by virtue of the executed concession agreement, as conceded the development, operation, and management of the airport to Asaba Airport Company Limited for a period of 30 years. The management of the airport covers all airside infrastructure, key airport facilities, and all landside infrastructure.

== Infrastructure ==
=== Runways ===
Asaba operates as a single-runway airport (11/29) with a length of 3,400 metres (11,200 feet) and a width of 45 metres (148 feet). Runway 11 is equipped with a Category 1 runway lighting system consisting of approach lights, runway edge lights, runway centerline lights, runway threshold lights, and taxiway lights. Precision approach path indicators (PAPI) are installed on both sides of runway 11.

Runway	Length	Width	ILS	Notes
11/29	3,400 metres (11,200 feet)	60 metres (200 feet)	CAT 1	PCN Strong enough for CAT “E” Aircraft; equipped with all NavAids necessary for night and International Operations – VOR, DME & ILS

A category 1 Instrument Landing System (ILS) is installed on runway 11 consisting of a glideslope, localiser & CVOR co-located with DME. The Takeoff Run Available (TORA) published in the Aeronautical Information Publication (AIP) is 3,400 meters in both directions. Nearly 90% of take-offs and landings are towards the east.

== Airlines and destinations ==
Airlines	Destinations
Aero Contractors	Abuja, Lagos
Air Peace	Abuja, Kano, Lagos
Arik Air	Abuja, Lagos
Max Air	Abuja
Overland Airways	Abuja
United Nigeria Airlines	Abuja, Lagos

== Expansion proposals ==
The FIDC-Menzies Consortium proposed development plan for Asaba International Airport, which are:

- The commencement of the modernisation programme of the airport through the upgrade of the existing terminal and ancillary facilities, the introduction of optical fibre to provide reliable internet communication the reorganisation of the airside terminal, and the general elevation of the passenger travel experience.

=== Short-to-medium-term development plan ===
- The introduction of international cargo services through the erection of a modern cargo terminal with ancillary facilities.
- The enhancement of commerce within the airport through the provision of office space, retail, and leisure facilities.
- The development of a hotel and conference facility. The long-term development plan is to transform the Asaba International Airport into an airport city with infrastructure, land use, and economy centering on the airport.

== See also ==
- Transport in Nigeria
- List of airports in Nigeria
