= Mallam Aminu Kano International Airport =

International airport serving Kano, Nigeria

Mallam Aminu Kano International Airport Filin Jirgin Saman Mallami Aminu Kano (Hausa)
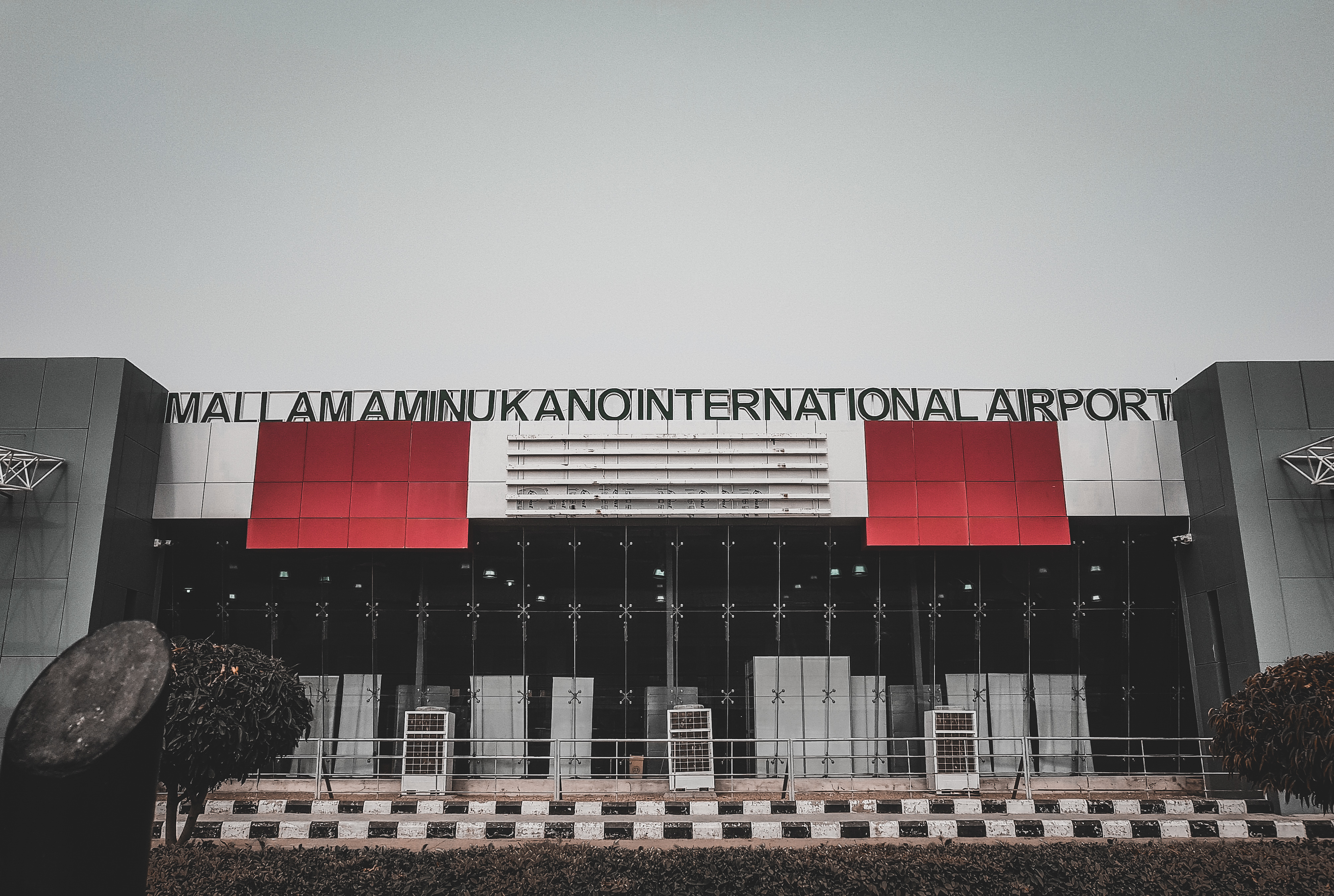
- IATA: KAN; ICAO: DNKN

Summary
- Airport type: Public/Military
- Owner/Operator: Federal Airports Authority of Nigeria (FAAN)
- Serves: Kano, Nigeria
- Hub for: Azman Air, Max Air
- Time zone: WAT (UTC+01:00)
- Elevation AMSL: 1,562 ft / 476 m
- Coordinates: 12°02′55″N 8°31′20″E

Map
- Location of the airport in Nigeria

Runways
| Direction | Length | | Surface |
| Direction | m | ft | Surface |
|---|---|---|---|
| 05/23 | 2,451 | 8,041 | Asphalt |
| 06/24 | 3,301 | 10,830 | Asphalt |

Statistics (2015)
- Passengers: 389,530
- Passenger change 14–15: ▼10.1%
- Sources: FAAN WAD GCM

Mallam Aminu Kano International Airport (Hausa: Filin Jirgin Saman Mallami Aminu Kano, IATA: KAN, ICAO: DNKN) is an international airport serving Kano, the capital city of Kano State in Nigeria. It was a Royal Air Force station before the country became independent. It is the main airport serving northern Nigeria and was named after the 20th-century politician Aminu Kano. The airport has an international and a domestic terminal. Construction started on a new domestic terminal and was commissioned on 23 May 2011. In 2009, the airport handled 323,482 passengers. The bulk of international flights cater to the large Sudanese community in Kano and Muslim pilgrimages to Mecca.

== History ==
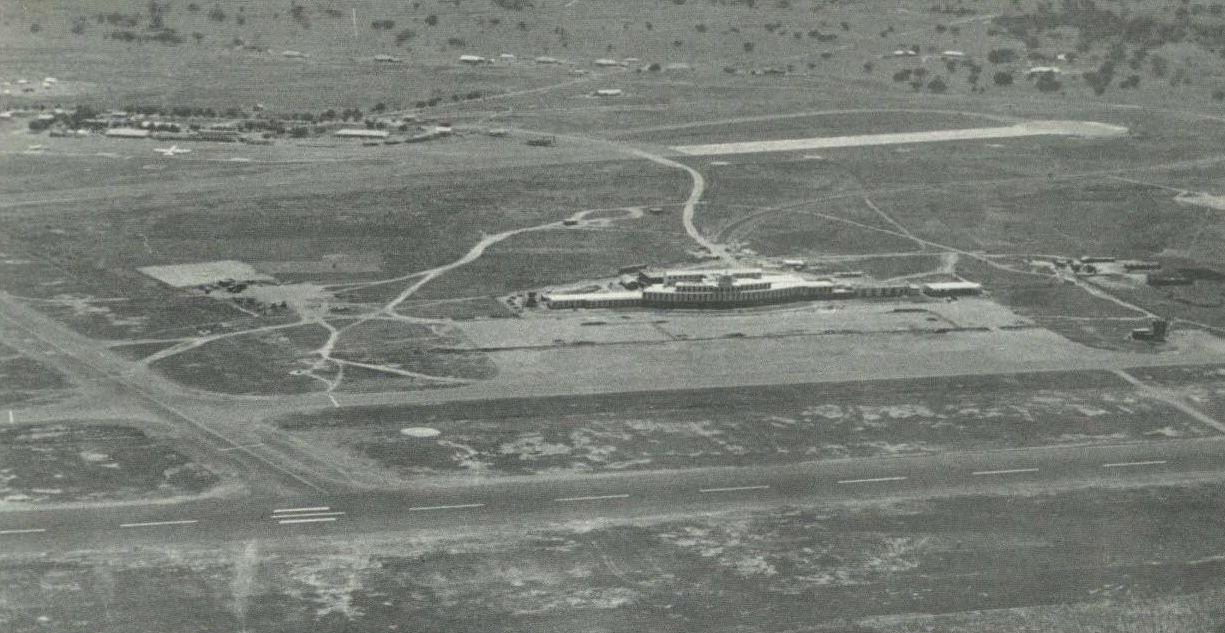
A view of the airport in 1957 after it was newly renovated. The terminal and runway used before the one centered in the image can be seen in the top left.

Mallam Aminu Kano International Airport is the oldest in Nigeria, with operations starting in 1936. In the first decades of operation, it became an important fuel stop for airlines flying long-haul services between Europe and Africa. Newer aircraft did not need such fuel stops and, with the demise of the Kano economy in the late 20th century, many international airlines stopped serving the airport. When they indefinitely suspended services to Kano in June 2012, KLM was the only European airline serving the city, which they had done without interruption since 1947.

== Facilities ==
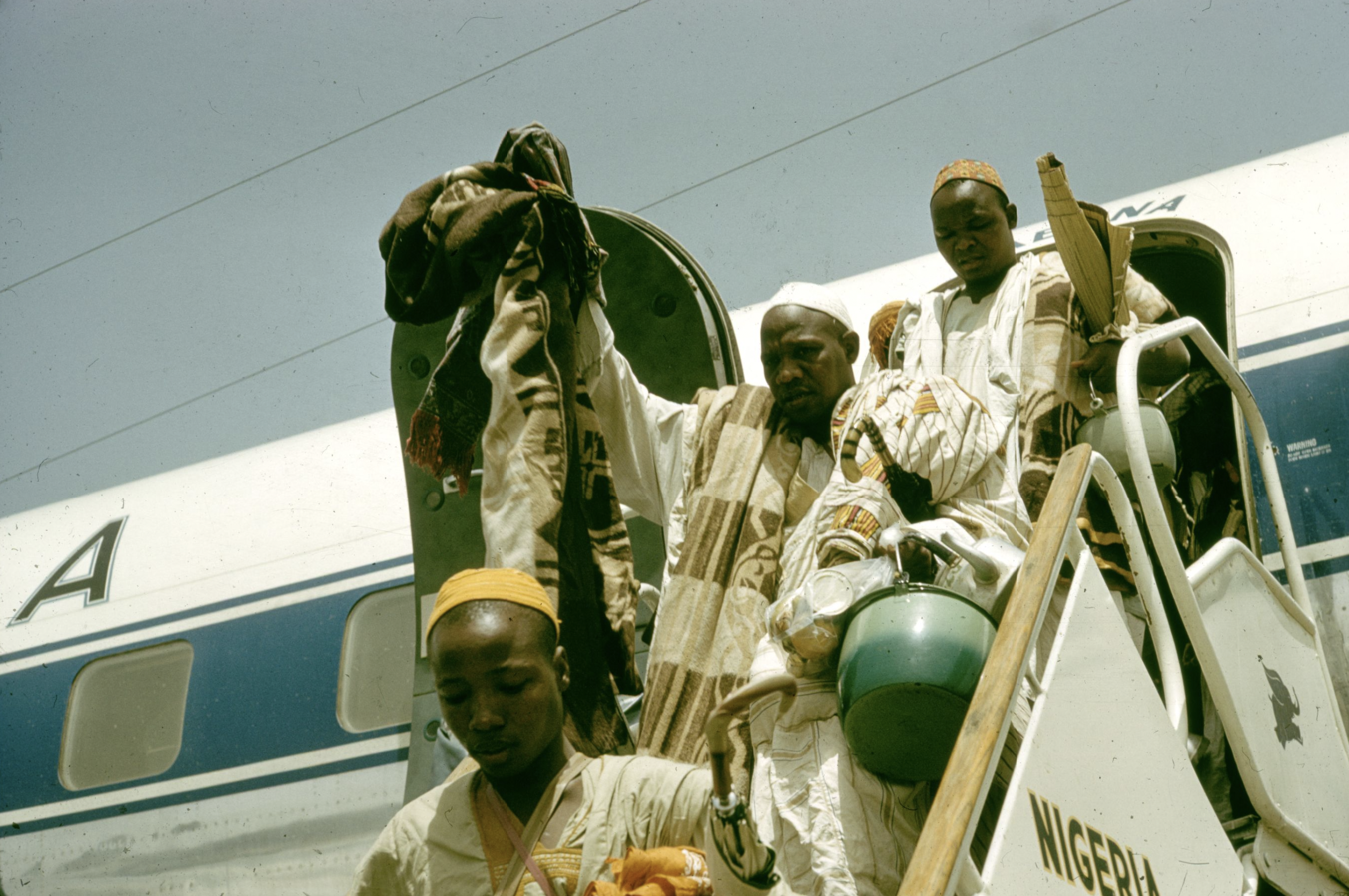
Passengers leaving a Nigeria Airways plane at the airport, 1961

The airport serves civilian and military flights. Runway 06/24 is mainly used for civilian flights, while runway 05/23 primarily serves the Nigerian Air Force base at the south side of the airport. Runway 05/23 was in use for all operations when the main runway was rehabilitated at the beginning of the 21st century. The terminal facilities lie between the two runways.

The main terminal with the control tower serves international flights and domestic services operated by Arik Air. Facilities in the departure lounge are minimal, with a newsstand near the check-in counter and a small bar at the airside. There is a small VIP lounge for business class passengers. Duty-free shops are currently closed. There is a small bar and a post office in the arrivals hall. On the south side of the airport, along runway 06/24, is the domestic terminal currently serving operations of IRS Airlines. Facilities include a newsstand and a small bar. Construction of a new domestic terminal, adjacent to the main terminal building, started at the beginning of the 21st century. Construction was abandoned but was resumed. The operator of the airport, Federal Airports Authority Nigeria (FAAN), saw the completion of the new terminal in November 2009. It was commissioned in May 2011.

== Airlines and destinations ==
=== Passenger ===
| Airlines | Destinations |
|---|---|
| Aero Contractors | Abuja, Lagos |
| Air Peace | Abuja, Asaba, Lagos, Niamey, Owerri, Port Harcourt |
| Arik Air | Abuja |
| Azman Air | Abuja, Lagos |
| Egyptair | Cairo |
| Ethiopian Airlines | Addis Ababa |
| Flynas | Jeddah |
| Max Air | Abuja, Benin City, Lagos; Seasonal charter: Jeddah |
| Qatar Airways | Doha |
| Saudia | Jeddah, Medina |
| ValueJet | Abuja |

=== Cargo ===
| Airlines | Destinations |
|---|---|
| Aerotranscargo | Munich |
| EgyptAir | Cairo |
| Ethiopian Airlines Cargo | Liège |
| Saudia Cargo | Jeddah |

== Statistics ==
These data show the number of passengers' movements into the airport, according to the Federal Airports Authority of Nigeria's Aviation Sector Summary Reports.

| Year | 2005 | 2006 | 2007 | 2008 | 2009 | 2010 | 2011 | 2012 | 2013 | 2014 | 2015 | 2016 | 2017 | 2021 |
|---|---|---|---|---|---|---|---|---|---|---|---|---|---|---|
| Passengers | 302,017 | 349,057 | 381,862 | 363,290 | 341,367 | 381,841 | 448,792 | 369,132 | 327,267 | 433,263 | 389,530 | 458,157 | 428,742 | 291,214 |
| Growth (%) | ▲3.13% | ▲15.58% | ▲9.40% | ▼4.86% | ▼6.03% | ▲11.86% | ▲17.53% | ▼17.75% | ▼11.34% | ▲32.39% | ▼10.09% | ▲17.62% | ▼6.42% | ▼32.1% |
Source: Federal Airports Authority of Nigeria (FAAN). Aviation Sector Reports (2010-2013, 2014, Q3-Q4 of 2015, Q1-Q2 of 2016, 2017, and 2021)

== Accidents and incidents ==
- On 24 June 1956, a BOAC four-engine Canadair C-4 Argonaut airliner crashed on departure from Kano International. Of the 45 passengers and crew on board, only 13 survived.
- On 22 January 1973, the Kano Air Disaster occurred - an Alia Boeing 707-320C crashed at Kano International while attempting a landing in high winds. 176 of the 202 passengers and crew on board were killed. It remains the worst aviation disaster in the history of Nigeria.
- On 31 March 1992 Trans-Air Service Flight 671 was a cargo flight from Luxembourg Airport to Mallam Aminu Kano International Airport in Kano, Nigeria. While flying over France on 31 March 1992, the Boeing 707 operating the flight experienced an in-flight separation of two engines on its right wing. Despite the damage to the aircraft, the pilots were able to perform an emergency landing at Istres-Le Tubé Air Base in Istres, France. All five occupants of the aircraft survived; however, the aircraft was damaged beyond repair due to a fire on the right wing.
- On 4 May 2002, EAS Airlines Flight 4226, a BAC 1-11-500 twin-engine jet crashed upon take-off from Mallam Aminu Kano International Airport, killing 73 passengers and crew on board as well as 30 more on the ground into whose houses the plane had crashed.

== See also ==
- Transport in Nigeria
- List of airports in Nigeria
- List of the busiest airports in Africa
