= Port Harcourt International Airport =

International airport serving Port Harcourt, Nigeria

Port International Airport
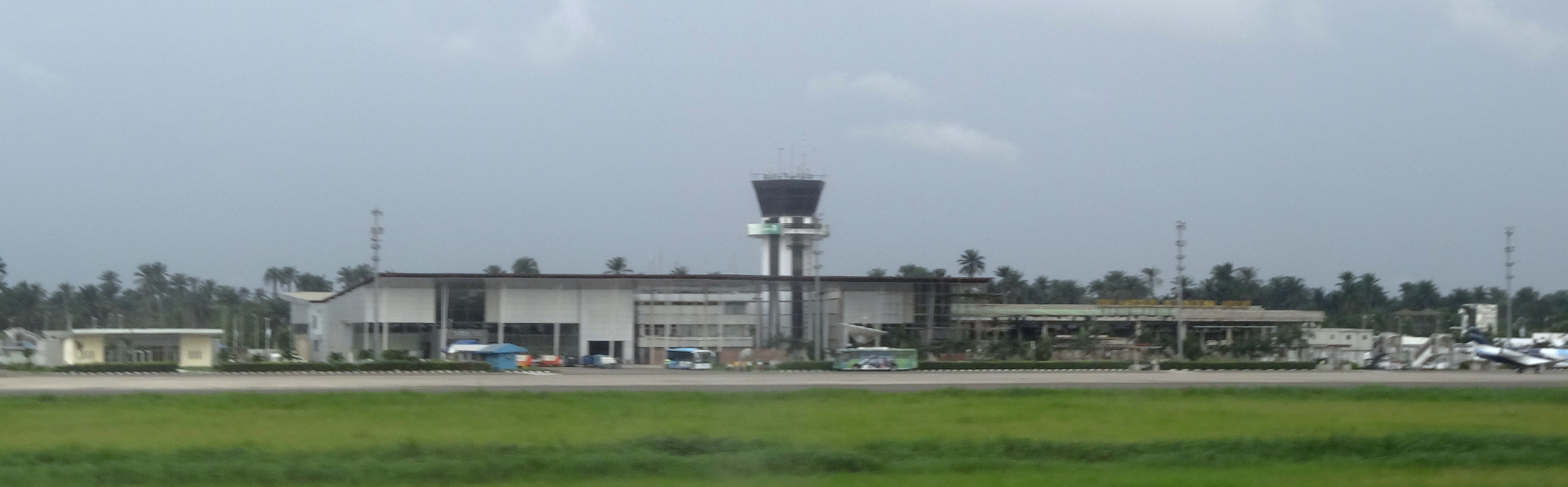
- IATA: PHC; ICAO: DNPO

Summary
- Airport type: Public
- Owner/Operator: Federal Airports Authority of Nigeria (FAAN)
- Serves: Port Harcourt
- Location: Omagwa, Nigeria
- Time zone: WAT (UTC+01:00)
- Elevation AMSL: 91 ft (28 m)
- Coordinates: 5°00′55″N 6°57′00″E

Map
- Location of the airport in Nigeria

Runways
Direction	Length		Surface
Direction	m	ft	Surface
03/21	3,000	9,843	Asphalt

Statistics (2024)
- Passengers: 1,190,000
- Aircraft movements: 15,667
- Cargo tonnage: 4,050,000 kg (8,930,000 lb)
- Sources: FAAN WAD GCM Google Maps

Port Harcourt International Airport (now Obafemi Jeremiah Awolowo Airport) (IATA: PHC, ICAO: DNPO) is an international airport located in Port Harcourt, the capital city of the Rivers State in Nigeria. The airport has two terminals for both international and domestic flights.

The new International terminal was commissioned by the executive president of the Federal Republic of Nigeria President Muhammadu Buhari on 25 October 2018. In 2009, the airport served 1,081,587 passengers, making it the third-busiest airport in Nigeria. The manager of the Port Harcourt international airport is Mrs Ifesinachi Ezike.

== History ==
In 1997, Air France started flights to Paris. The Paris-Port Harcourt route was later suspended in 2019.

On 18 August 2006, the airport was closed for repairs. The Nigerian Civil Aviation Authority stated that the emergency shutdown was in order to overhaul the runway and build a fence around the facility. Such maintenance had been in planning stages for several months, but an electrical fire on 17 August 2006 made repairs immediately necessary. All domestic flights were diverted to Sam Mbakwe Airport (Owerri), Akanu Ibiam International Airport (Enugu) and Margaret Ekpo International Airport (Calabar), while international flights were diverted to Nnamdi Azikiwe International Airport (Abuja) or Murtala Mohammed International Airport (Lagos). Repair work started in January 2007, while re-opening was originally expected to be in August 2007. In June 2007, work was suspended due to safety concerns of the engineers. In December 2007, the airport was reopened to a limited capacity. Operations were restricted to daytime until the first quarter of 2008, by which time the new CAT III lighting system became fully operational.

In 2015, the airport gained notoriety for having been declared the worst in the world; amid this, the construction of a new passenger terminal was underway, which later opened in 2018.

== Other facilities ==
The Nigerian Civil Aviation Authority has its Port Harcourt office on the airport grounds.

== Airlines and destinations ==
=== Passenger ===
Airlines	Destinations
Aero Contractors	Abuja, Lagos
Air Peace	Abuja, Kano, Lagos
Arik Air	Abuja, Lagos
Cronos Airlines	Malabo
Ethiopian Airlines	Addis Ababa (begins 1 December 2026)
Ibom Air	Abuja, Lagos
Lufthansa	Frankfurt
Qatar Airways	Doha
ValueJet	Lagos, Malabo

=== Cargo ===
Airlines	Destinations
Air France Cargo	Paris–Charles de Gaulle
Air Atlanta Icelandic	Liège
Cargolux Airlines	Luxembourg
Western Global Airlines	Liège

== Statistics ==
These data show number of passengers movements into the airport, according to the Federal Airports Authority of Nigeria's Aviation Sector Summary Reports.

Year	2005	2006	2007	2008	2009	2010	2011	2012	2013	2014	2015
Passengers	917,151	679,282	278,363	868,458	1,080,088	1,211,816	1,346,611	1,192,136	1,220,306	1,337,477	1,223,807
Growth (%)	▲5.39%	▼25.94%	▼59.02%	▲211.99%	▲24.37%	▲12.20%	▲11.12%	▼11.47%	▲2.36%	▲9.60%	▼8.50%
Source: Federal Airports Authority of Nigeria (FAAN). Aviation Sector Reports (2010-2013, 2014, Q3-Q4 of 2015, and Q1-Q2 of 2016)

== Accidents and incidents ==
- On 17 December 1996, an MK Airlines DC-8-55F arriving from Luxembourg struck trees, landed short of the runway and burned. All four crew survived.
- On 27 November 2001, an MK Airlines Boeing 747-200F crashed in bad weather on short final to Port Harcourt International Airport, killing one crew member. Nigeria's Ministry of Aviation, produced a Civil Aviation Accident Report (FMA/AIPB/389) that found the pilot was using a nonstandard final approach on autopilot below 2000 feet, contrary to the company's policy.
- On 6 July 2005, an Air France Airbus A330 carrying 196 passengers collided with a herd of cows just after touchdown at Port Harcourt Airport. There were no fatalities on board, however the nose was damaged, leading to the cancellation of the return flight.
- On 10 December 2005, Sosoliso Airlines Flight 1145 crashed at Port Harcourt Airport after flying from Nnamdi Azikiwe International Airport in Abuja. Of 110 passengers and crew on board, there were only two survivors.
- On 22 June 2019, an Air Peace Boeing 737 with 87 passengers and 6 crew from Abuja to Port Harcourt exited the runway while landing in heavy rain and came to rest in soft mud.
- In 2023, a Value Jet CRJ900 Bombardier airline slipped off the runaway carrying 62 passengers and five crew members. There were no casualties

== See also ==
- Transport in Nigeria
- List of airports in Nigeria
