= Akure Airport =

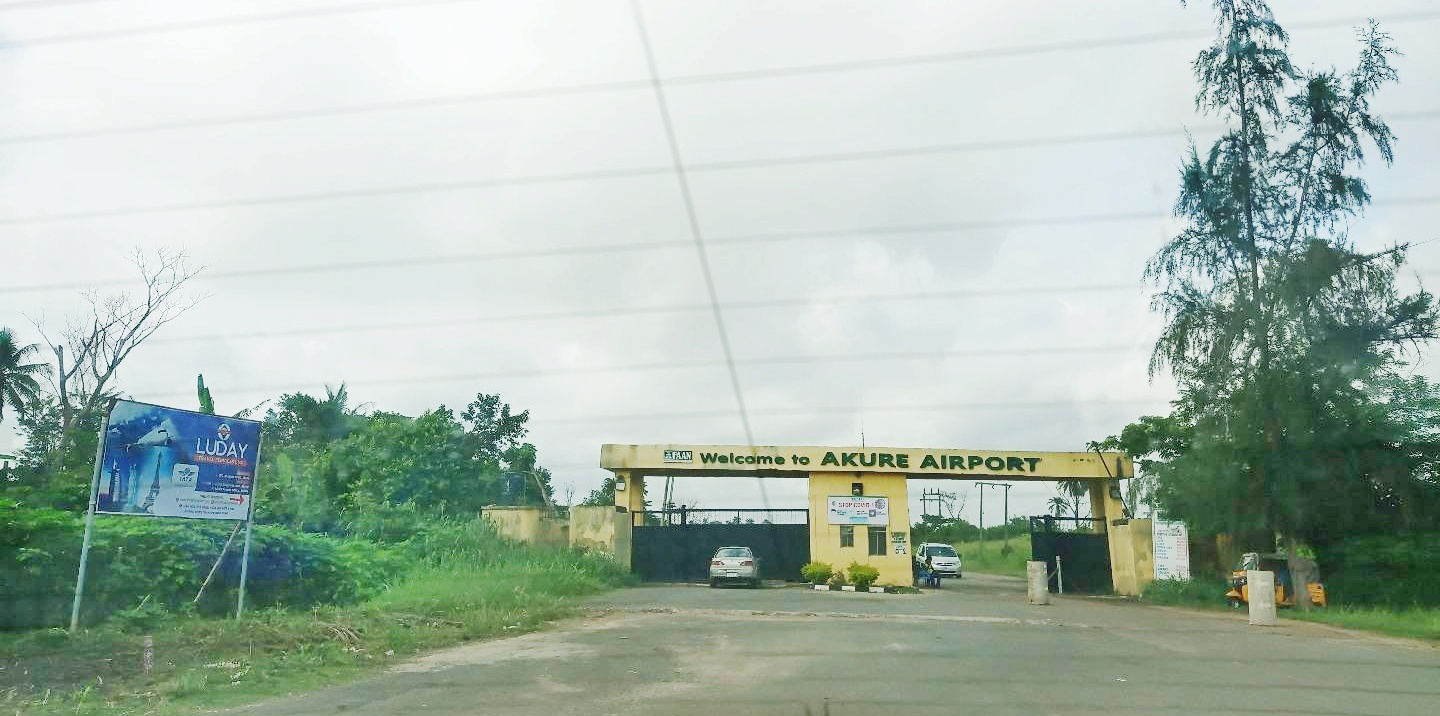
- IATA: AKR; ICAO: DNAK

Summary
- Airport type: Public
- Operator: Federal Airports Authority of Nigeria (FAAN)
- Location: Akure, Nigeria
- Elevation AMSL: 1,108 ft (338 m)
- Coordinates: 7°14′55″N 5°18′05″E

Map
- Location of the airport in Nigeria

Runways
Direction	Length		Surface
Direction	m	ft	Surface
03/21	2,803	9,196	Asphalt
- Source: WAD GCM Google Maps

Akure Airport (IATA: AKR, ICAO: DNAK) is an airport serving Akure, the capital of Ondo State, Nigeria.

The Akure non-directional beacon (Ident: AK) is located on the field.

== Description ==
Akure Airport was created to facilitate air travel and, in particular, to further open up the Ondo State with the hope of turning it into a commercial hub. The airport, which serves Ondo State, underwent renovations in 2023 to bring it up to the standards set by other airports across the world. It is a public airport that is located a few kilometers outside of the city.

Additionally, it has been designated as a perishable and non-perishable cargo airport in order to make use of the state's agricultural export capabilities and give farmers and businesspeople access to the global market.

== Airlines and destinations ==
Airlines	Destinations
Air Peace	Abuja, Lagos
Overland Airways	Abuja

== Latest development ==
The Federal Airport Authority of Nigeria (FAAN) and a private company signed a contract on May 9, 2023, to hire over 14,000 experienced personnel to transform Akure cargo airport into Aerotropoli City in the state. According to reports, the project, which will cost 56 billion naira, is the first of its sort in sub-Saharan Africa.

== See also ==
- Transport in Nigeria
- List of airports in Nigeria
