= Air Peace =

Nigerian airline

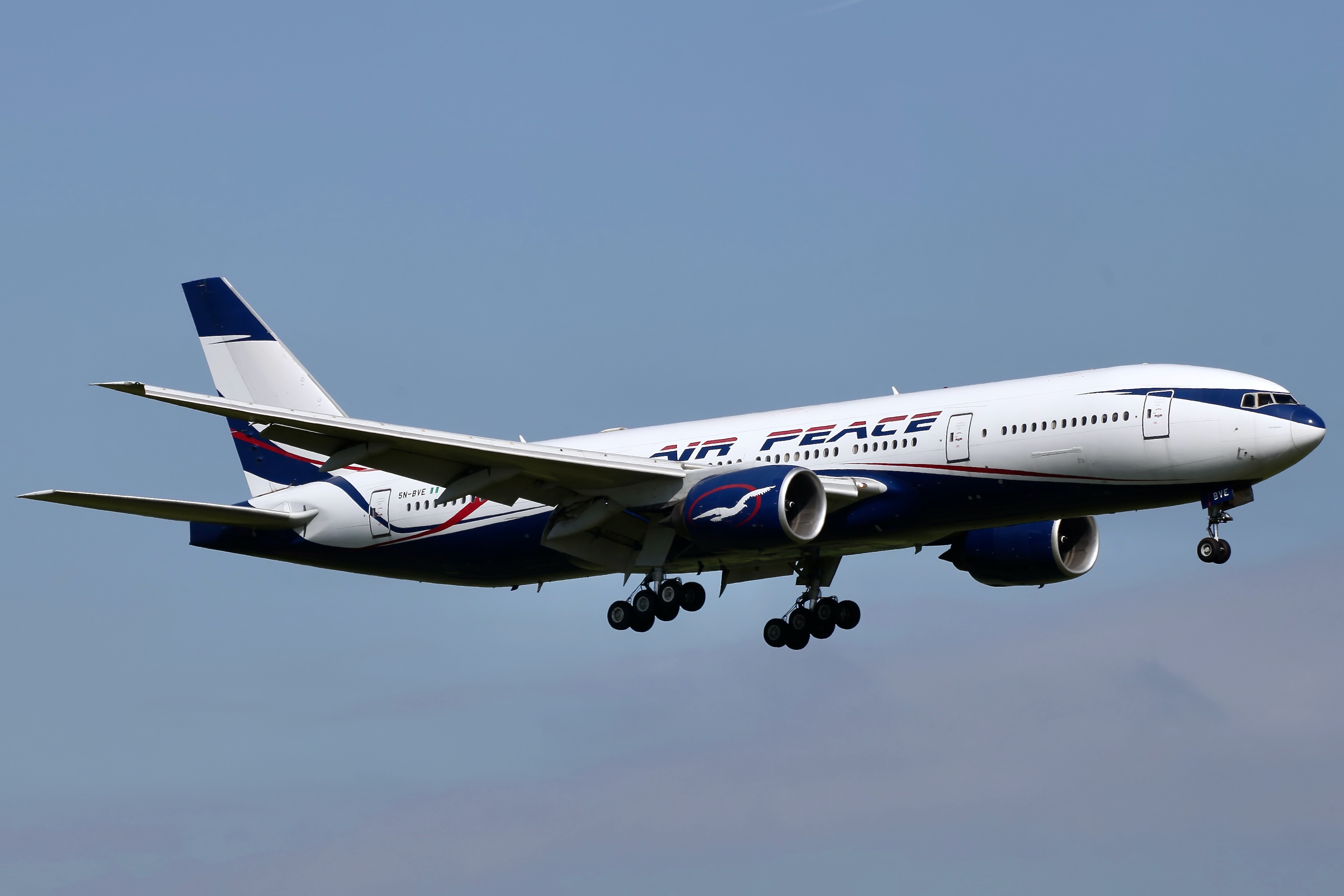
- Air Peace Boeing 777-200ER
IATA	ICAO	Call sign
P4	APK	PEACE BIRD
- Founded: 2014
- Operating bases: Murtala Muhammed International Airport; Nnamdi Azikiwe International Airport
- Subsidiaries: Air Peace Hopper; Liat Air (70%)
- Fleet size: 16
- Destinations: 20
- Headquarters: Ikeja, Lagos State, Nigeria
- Key people: Allen Onyema (CEO)
- Website: flyairpeace.com

Air Peace Limited is a privately owned Nigerian airline founded in 2014 with its head office in Ikeja, Lagos State. It is the largest airline in West Africa. Air Peace, which provides passenger and charter services, serves the major cities of Nigeria and flies to several West African destinations, the Middle East, the Caribbean, and the United Kingdom. The airline also established a subsidiary, Air Peace Hopper, in 2018.

== History ==
=== Founding ===
Air Peace was founded in 2014 by Nigerian lawyer and businessman Allen Onyema. Onyema says that he started the airline with the intention of using it as an engine to provide economic opportunities to Nigerian youth. The airline began operations with Dornier 328s and Boeing 737s. In 2017, the first international route to Accra was launched. By 2018, Air Peace had the largest market share in the domestic airline market in Nigeria. That same year, the airline took delivery of its first Boeing 777s, and it commenced flights to Sharjah in 2019. Flights to Johannesburg commenced in 2020.

=== South Africa evacuation flights ===
Following the 2019 Johannesburg riots against foreign nationals, Air Peace offered to evacuate Nigerian citizens for free. Over 300 persons took advantage of this offer and traveled on board Boeing 777 flights from Johannesburg to Lagos.

=== Money laundering allegations and security concerns ===
In 2019, the United States Department of Justice issued an indictment against Air Peace founder and CEO Allen Onyema on the grounds of money laundering and bank fraud. Onyema was accused of falsifying documents used for the purchase of aircraft for Air Peace and using those to fund purchases of luxury cars and high-end shopping. Onyema denies these allegations. In October 2022, his alleged co-conspirator pleaded guilty and was sentenced to a fine and three years probation. Onyema and the Chief Financial Officer of Air Peace remain charged with 36 counts of criminality. In October 2024, Onyema was additionally charged with two counts of obstructing justice and conspiracy to obstruct justice, due to his alleged falsification of documents used in his defense against the original charges.

=== Safety issues and cover-ups ===
Also in 2019, the Accident Investigation Bureau (Nigeria) accused Air Peace of persistent failure to report serious incidents and accidents involving its aircraft. Some issues cited by the AIB included failure to report incidents that resulted in structural damage and erasure of Cockpit Voice Recorders prior to reporting incidents. The airline's management was cited for "willfully [failing] to comply" with the Bureau's regulations, and it was further stated that the management "lacks the full understanding of the statutory mandates".

=== UAE slot controversy ===
In April 2021, the chief operations officer of Air Peace stated that 17 of their aircraft were grounded for maintenance reasons, thus reducing the carrier's operational fleet to just eight aircraft.

In December 2021, Air Peace indulged in a controversy with the General Civil Aviation Authority of the UAE. As per the reports, Emirates turned down the airlines' request for three slots instead of one at Sharjah International Airport, calling it "unreasonable." The UAE authorities said that Air Peace should consider flying the other two flights to any of the other airports in the country. Air Peace condemned the Emirati claims, however, accusing its officials of falsehood. The airline also called for an apology from the UAE, along with a retraction. Prior to issue, the Nigerian government had reduced the slots of Dubai-based Emirates from 21 to one, following which the airline also suspended all its flights to Abuja and Lagos. The matter came as a threat to the diplomatic relations between the two countries. A diplomatic crisis was averted after Dubai Airports allocated slots at Dubai for Air Peace.

=== Operations halt ===
In May 2022, Air Peace announced a plan to halt all domestic and regional flights, along with other airlines such as Max Air, Arik Air, Ibom Air, United Nigeria Airlines, and others, citing staffing and the rising costs of jet fuel. That plan was abandoned after government officials stepped in to aid the airlines affected.

== Destinations ==
As of August 2026, Air Peace flies to the following destinations in Nigeria, West Africa, Southern Africa, Asia, and Europe:

Country	City	Airport	Notes	Refs
Antigua and Barbuda	St. John's	V. C. Bird International Airport		
Barbados	Bridgetown	Sir Grantley Adams International Airport		
Brazil	São Paulo	São Paulo-Guarulhos International Airport	16 of December	
Cameroon	Douala	Douala International Airport		
Gambia	Banjul	Banjul International Airport		
Ghana	Accra	Accra International Airport		
Ivory Coast	Abidjan	Félix Houphouët Boigny International Airport		
Liberia	Monrovia	Roberts International Airport		
Nigeria	Abuja	Nnamdi Azikiwe International Airport	Hub	
Nigeria	Akure	Akure Airport		
Nigeria	Asaba	Asaba International Airport		
Nigeria	Benin City	Benin Airport		
Nigeria	Calabar	Margaret Ekpo International Airport		
Nigeria	Enugu	Akanu Ibiam International Airport		
Nigeria	Gombe	Gombe Lawanti International Airport		
Nigeria	Ibadan	Ibadan Airport		
Nigeria	Ilorin	Ilorin International Airport		
Nigeria	Kaduna	Kaduna International Airport		
Nigeria	Kano	Mallam Aminu Kano International Airport		
Nigeria	Lagos	Murtala Muhammed International Airport	Hub	
Nigeria	Makurdi	Makurdi Airport		
Nigeria	Owerri	Sam Mbakwe International Cargo Airport		
Nigeria	Port Harcourt	Port Harcourt International Airport		
Nigeria	Umuleri	Anambra International Cargo Airport		
Nigeria	Uyo	Victor Attah International Airport		
Nigeria	Warri	Osubi Airport		
Nigeria	Yola	Yola Airport		
Saudi Arabia	Jeddah	King Abdulaziz International Airport		
Senegal	Dakar	Blaise Diagne International Airport		
Sierra Leone	Freetown	Lungi International Airport		
South Africa	Johannesburg	O. R. Tambo International Airport	Terminated	
Togo	Lomé	Lomé–Tokoin International Airport	Terminated	
Turkey	Istanbul	Istanbul Airport		
United Kingdom	London	Gatwick Airport		
United Kingdom	London	Heathrow Airport		

On 31 January 2020, Air Peace announced two new destinations in India and Israel would be activated before the end of the year. Air Peace also operated ad hoc charter flights from Lagos to Montego Bay in Jamaica during the Christmas 2020 season.

=== Planned flight to São Paulo, Brazil ===
In 25 August 2025, the governments of Brazil and Nigeria signed a series of bilateral agreements and MoUs aiming at deepening relations between the two countries in diverse economic sectors regarding trade and investment, among which was a Bilateral Air Services Agreement (BASA) with the purpose of fostering a direct flight between Lagos and São Paulo operated by Air Peace. Originally expected to begin operations in March 2026, the airline currently has no set inauguration date for direct flights between the cities, although the airline has clarified that it will go through the procedures to prepare effectively for operating the route, explaining that “until these requirements are fully met, no responsible airline would announce ticket sales or commence operations. Statements of intention or optimism must not be misrepresented as guarantees". On 21 June 2026, Brazil's National Civil Aviation Agency granted Air Peace approval to operate international flights from Brazil, determining that the airline met the country's required criteria for operating flights that Air Peace claims will cut down travel time from West Africa to São Paulo down to seven hours.

=== Interline agreements ===
Air Peace currently has interline agreements with Emirates and Hahn Air.

== Fleet ==
As of June 2025, Air Peace's fleet consists of the following aircraft:

Air Peace current fleet

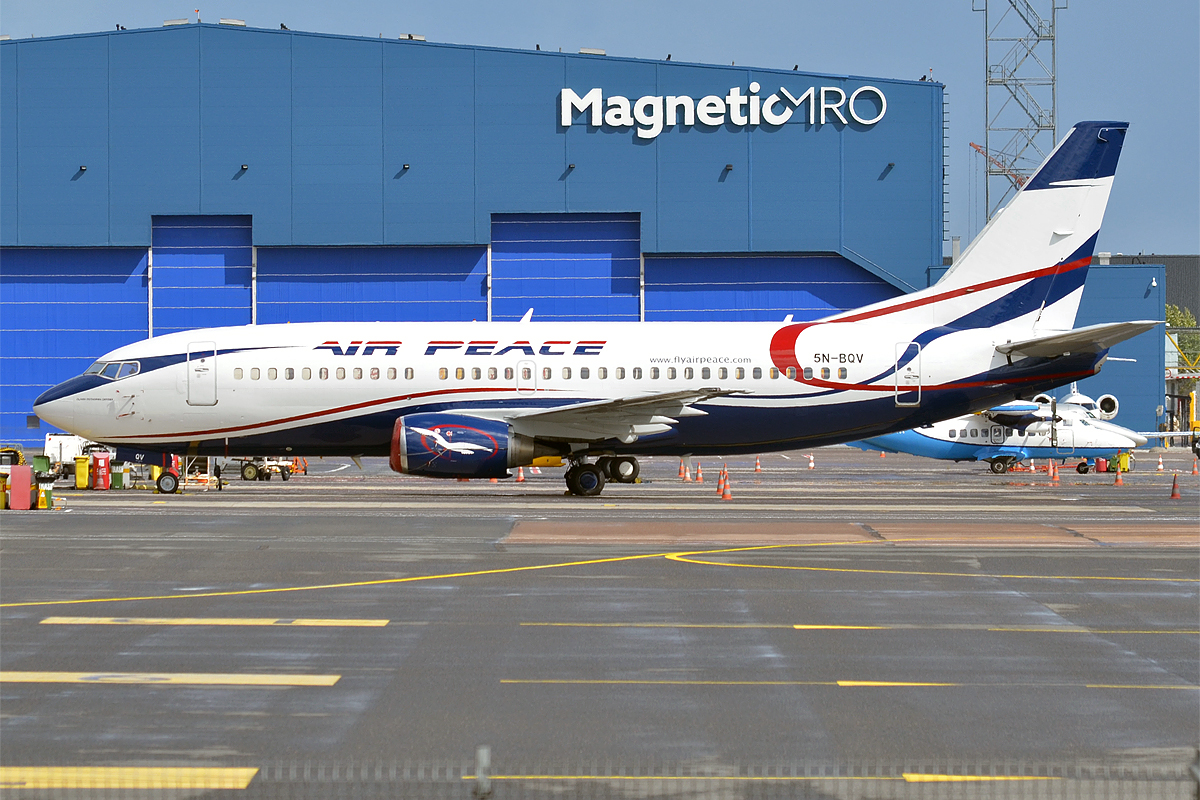
Air Peace Boeing 737-300 at Tallinn Airport in Estonia

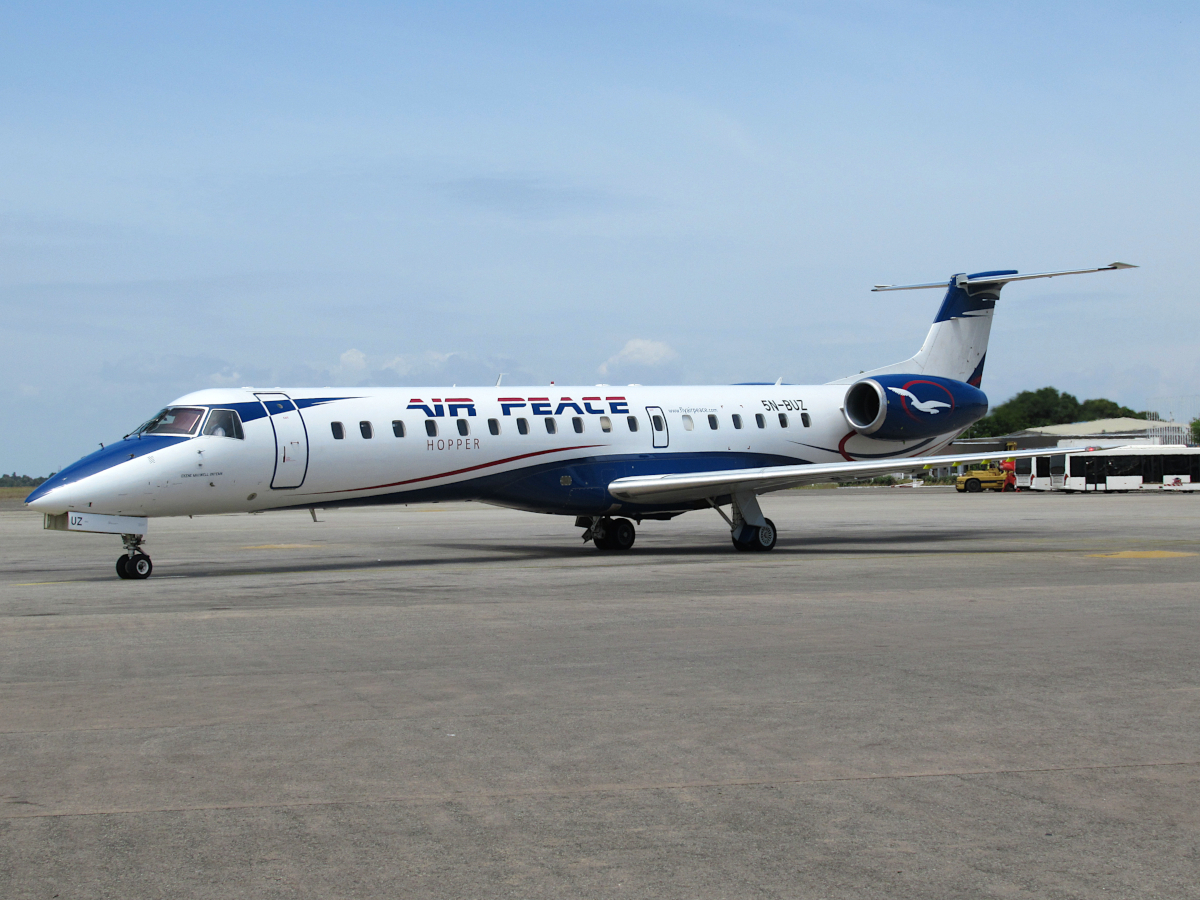
Air Peace Hopper Embraer ERJ 145 at Lungi International Airport in Sierra Leone

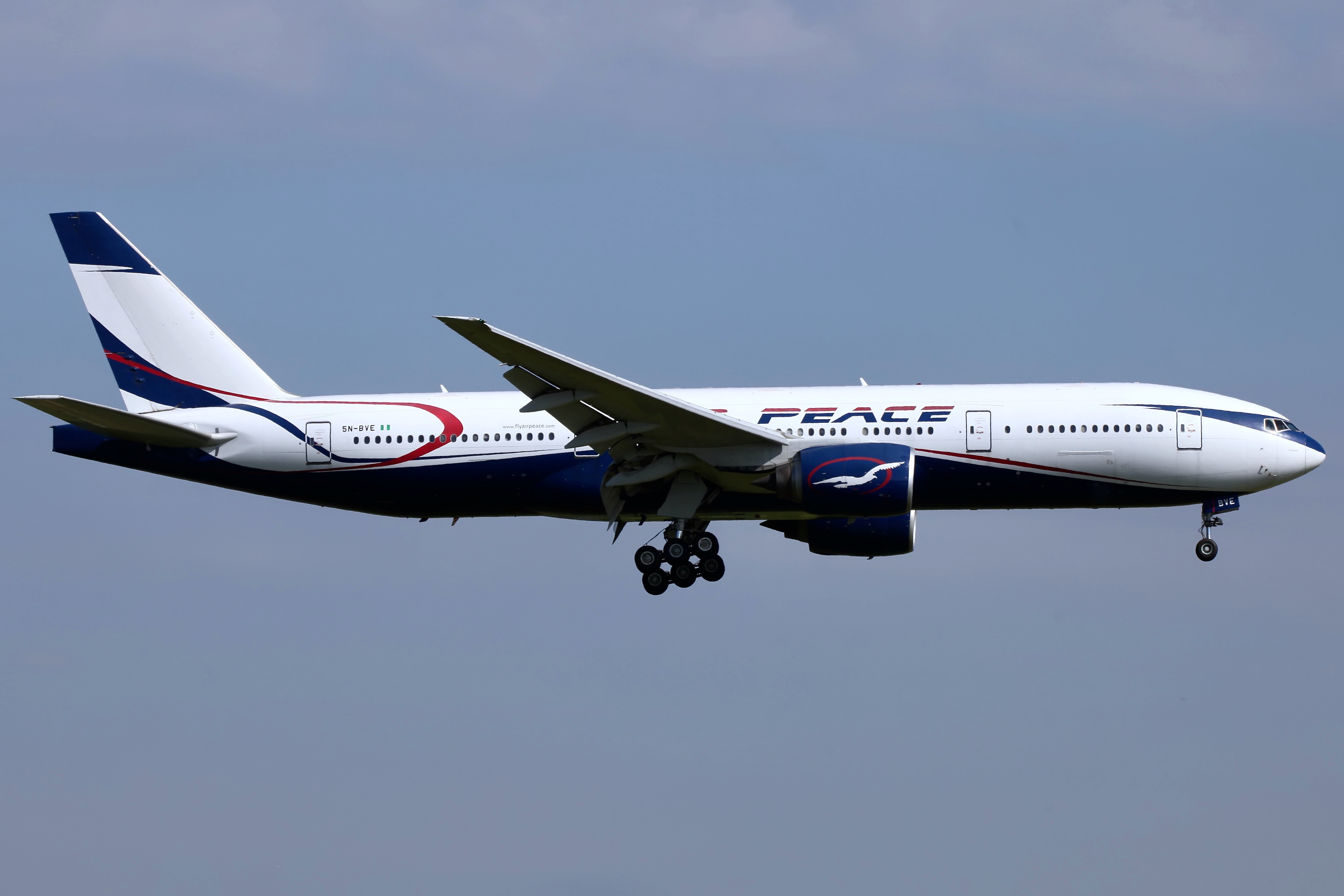
Air Peace Boeing 777-21HER

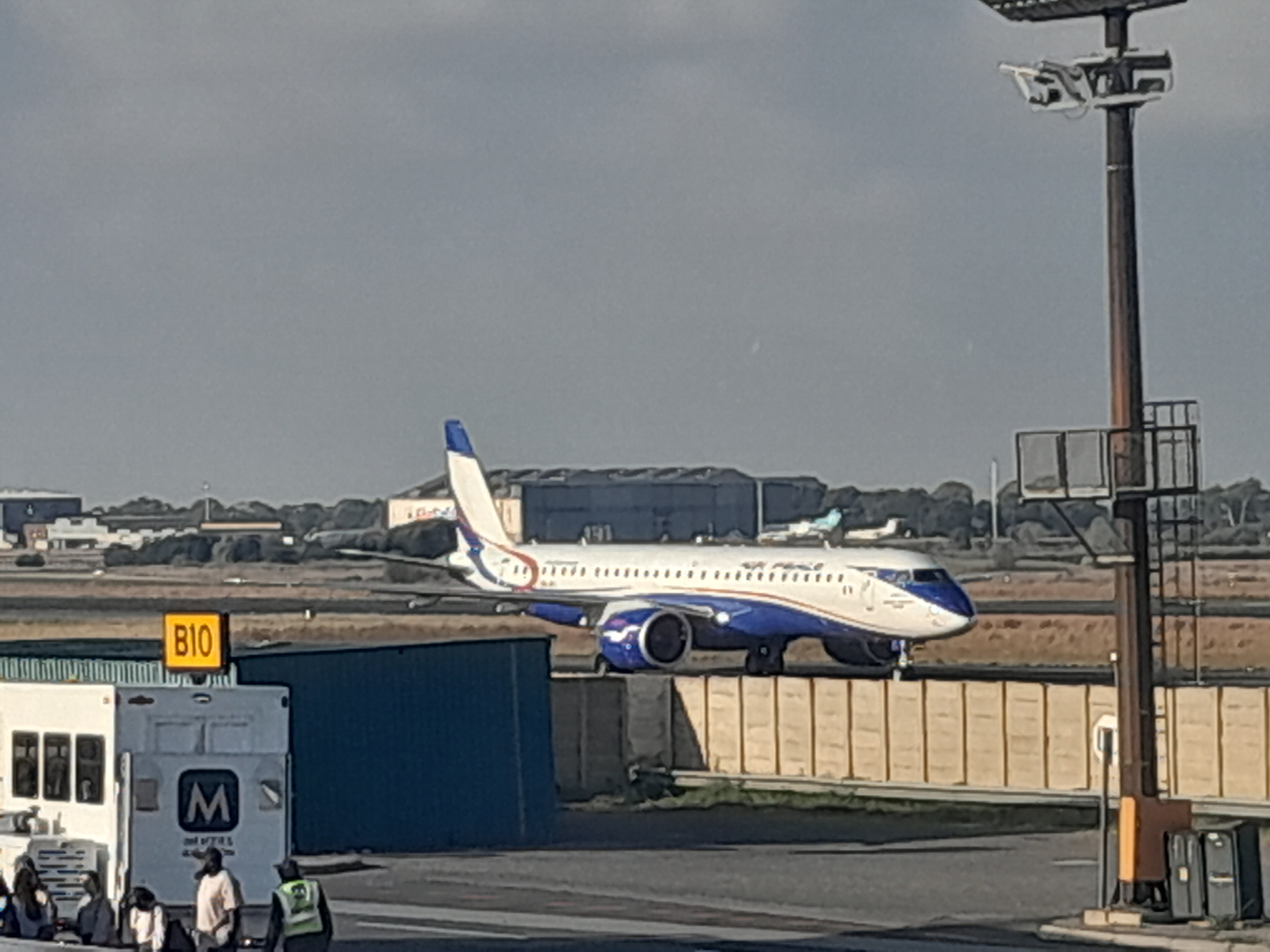
Air Peace Embraer 195-E2

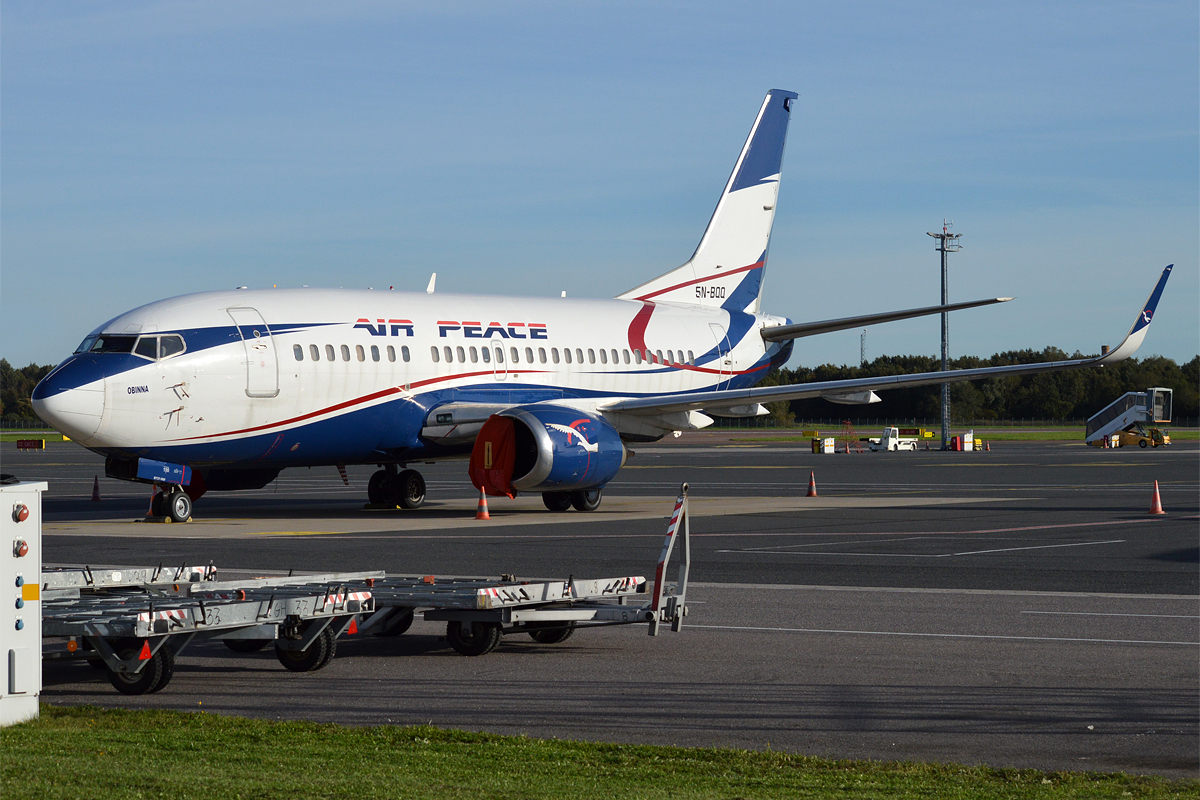
Air Peace Boeing 737-500

Air Peace fleet
Aircraft	In service	Orders	Passengers				Notes
Aircraft	In service	Orders	F	J	Y	Total	Notes
Boeing 737-700	1	—	—	8	120	128	Leased from AerCap Global
Boeing 777-200ER	1	—	12	42	220	274	
Embraer ERJ 145	8	—	—	—	50	50	Operated by Air Peace Hopper
Embraer 195-E2	5	8	—	12	112	124	
Embraer 175	1	—	—	—	88	88	5N-CGH

== Accidents and incidents ==
Air Peace has been involved in multiple aviation incidents and accidents, all of which involved Boeing 737s:

- On 12 March 2016, an Air Peace Boeing 737 from Port Harcourt to Lagos made an emergency landing in Port Harcourt following a smoke detector indication. The aircraft was evacuated via slides and there were no serious injuries.
- On 14 December 2018, an Air Peace Boeing 737 from Lagos to Enugu with 130 passengers and six crew suffered a loss of cabin pressure at 31,000 feet. Although the oxygen masks deployed, the crew elected to continue the flight after an emergency descent. Two passengers were subsequently treated for complications related to the decompression.
- On 15 May 2019, an Air Peace Boeing 737 from Port Harcourt to Lagos suffered a hard landing that resulted in damage to the engine pod and the landing gear. The aircraft was grounded, although no injuries were reported.
- On 22 June 2019, an Air Peace Boeing 737 with 87 passengers and six crew from Abuja to Port Harcourt exited the runway while landing in heavy rain and came to rest in soft mud.
- On 23 July 2019, an Air Peace Boeing 737 with 133 passengers and six crew landed on Lagos' runway 18R but suffered a hard touch down causing both nose wheels to separate from the nose gear strut. The aircraft skidded to a halt on the runway on main wheels and the rest of the nose gear strut. There was one minor injury. The aircraft sustained substantial damage as did the runway.
- On 5 November 2019, an Air Peace Boeing 737 with 90 passengers and six crew suffered an engine failure en route from Lagos to Owerri. The aircraft returned to Lagos where it landed safely without further incident.
- On 24 July 2021, an Air Peace Boeing 737 from Abuja to Ilorin suffered burst nose gear tires and became disabled on the runway upon landing. The airport was closed until the damaged aircraft could be safely removed from the runway.
- On 22 November 2021, an Air Peace Boeing 737 with 95 passengers and six crew flying from Owerri to Lagos reported an engine failure and suspected fire immediately following departure. The crew returned safely to land in Owerri on a single engine.
- On 13 July 2025, Air Peace Flight 7190, a Boeing 737-500 operating from Lagos Murtala Muhammed International Airport to Port Harcourt Airport veered off the runway. All passengers survived. The investigation report revealed that both pilots were under the influence of alcohol, and a cabin crew member was under the influence of cannabis.
