= Murtala Muhammed International Airport =

International airport serving Lagos, Nigeria

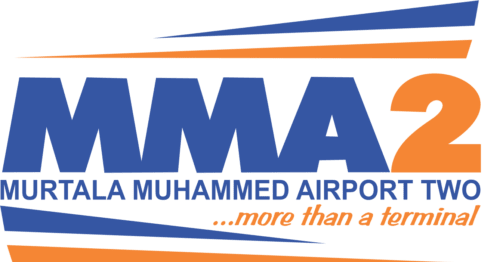

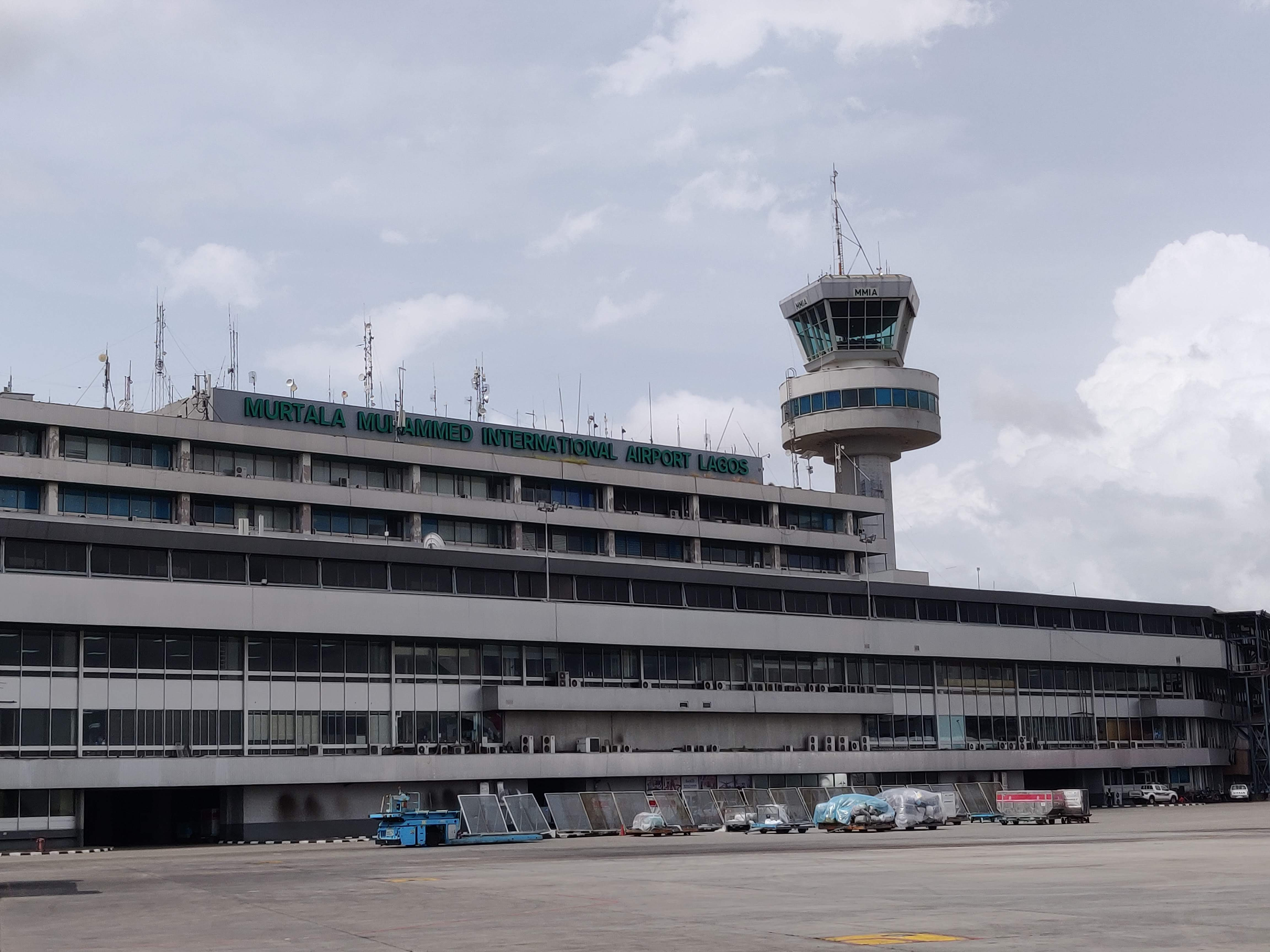
- Murtala Muhammed International Airport in 2019
- IATA: LOS; ICAO: DNMM

Summary
- Airport type: Public
- Owner/Operator: Federal Airports Authority of Nigeria (FAAN)
- Serves: Ikeja; Lagos; Lekki
- Location: Ikeja, Lagos State, Nigeria
- Hub for: Aero Contractors; Arik Air; Azman Air; Rano Air; Air Peace; Ibom Air; ValueJet (Nigeria)
- Time zone: WAT (UTC+01:00)
- Elevation AMSL: 135 ft (41 m)
- Coordinates: 06°34′38″N 003°19′16″E
- Website: mma2.ng

Map
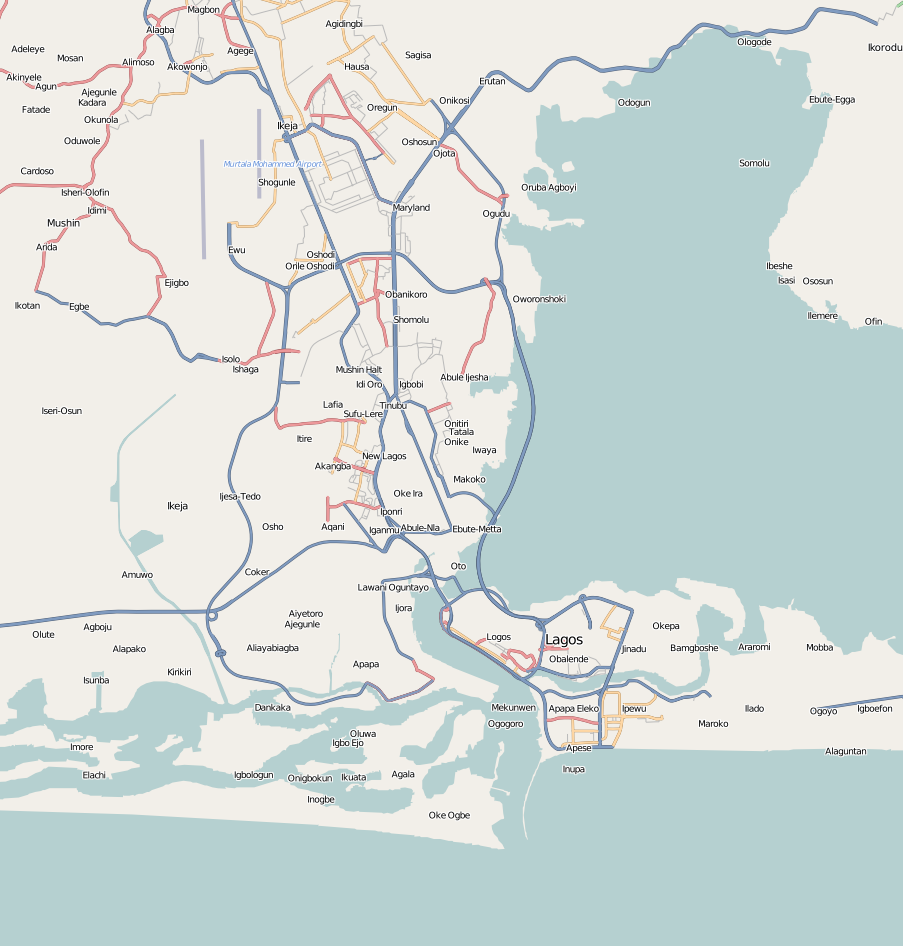
- Location of Airport in Lagos LOS (Nigeria) LOS (Africa)

Runways
Direction	Length		Surface
Direction	m	ft	Surface
18R/36L	3,900	12,794	Asphalt
18L/36R	2,743	8,999	Asphalt

Statistics (2021)
- Passengers: 5,689,234
- Sources: National Bureau of Statistics, Nigeria Federal Airports Authority of Nigeria WAD GCM

Murtala Muhammed International Airport (MMIA) (IATA: LOS, ICAO: DNMM) is an international airport located in Ikeja, Lagos State, Nigeria, and is the major airport serving the entire state. The airport was initially built during World War II and is named after Murtala Muhammed (1938–1976), the fourth head of state of Nigeria.

== History ==
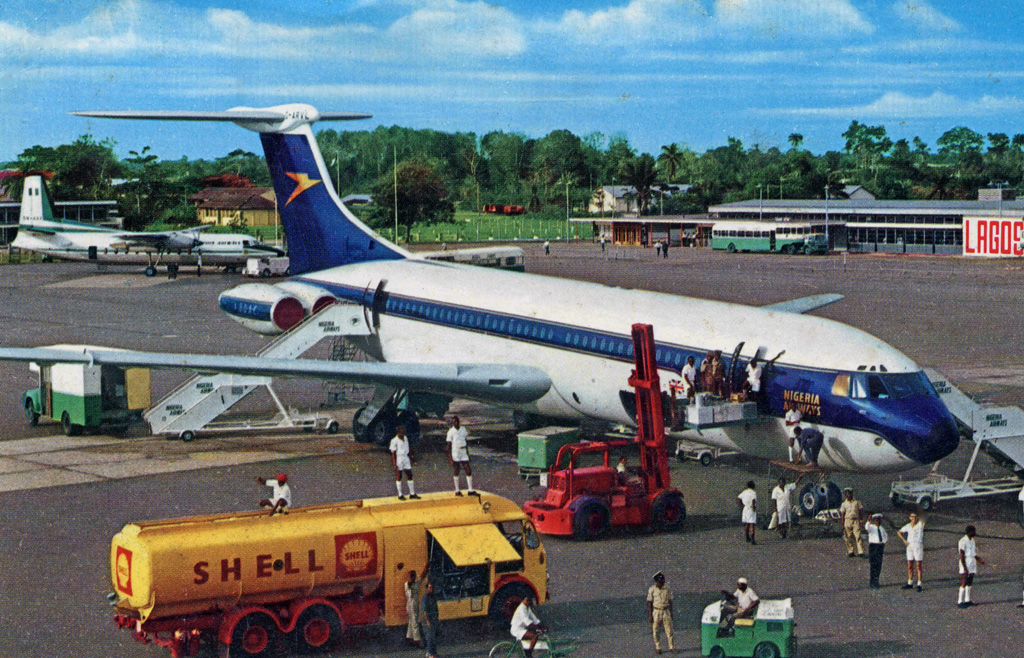
Lagos Airport in 1969 with a Vickers VC-10 of Nigeria Airways and a Fokker F27 Friendship at the stands. International terminal (right) and Domestic terminal (left).

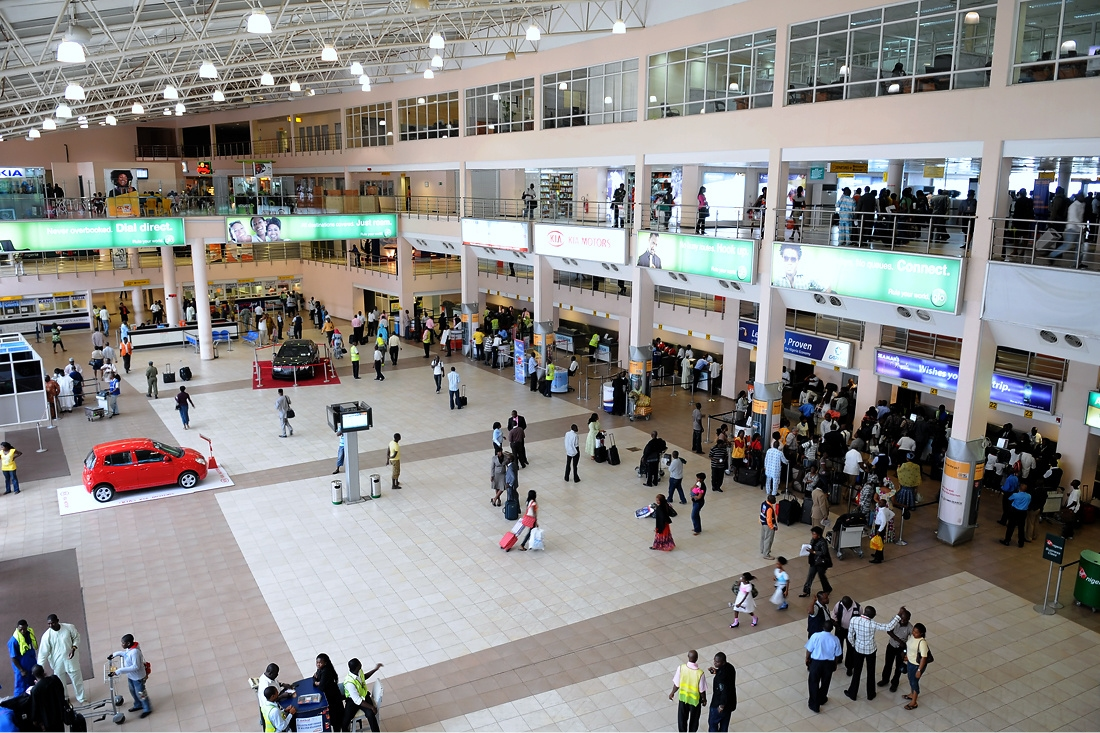
Ticketing Hall in Domestic Terminal.

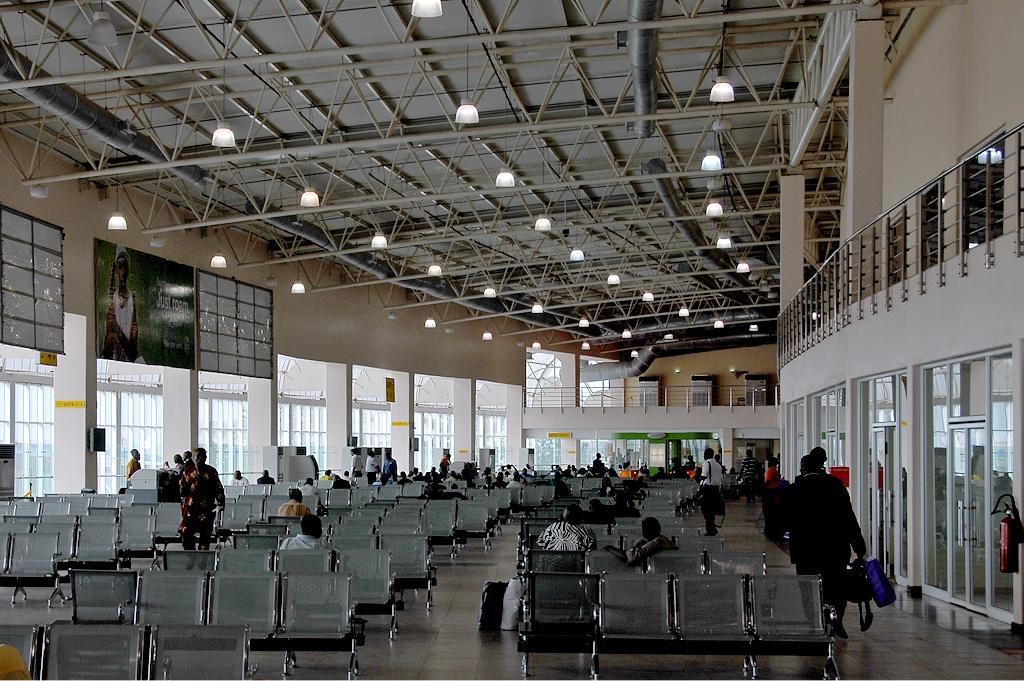
Main Departures Hall in Domestic Terminal.

The airport was built during World War II. West African Airways Corporation (WAAC) was formed in 1947 and had its main base at Ikeja. De Havilland Doves were initially operated on WAACs Nigerian internal routes then West African services. Larger Douglas Dakotas were added to the Ikeja-based fleet from 1957.

Originally known as Lagos Airport, it was renamed after the military head of state Murtala Muhammed in 1976 following his assassination in a failed coup attempt. A new international terminal modeled after Amsterdam Airport Schiphol was constructed through the decade at a cost of ₦240 million, officially opening on 15 March 1979, as part of a broader master plan to ensure sufficient capacity through the year 2000. It is the main base for Nigeria's largest airline, Air Peace, as well as for several other Nigerian airlines.

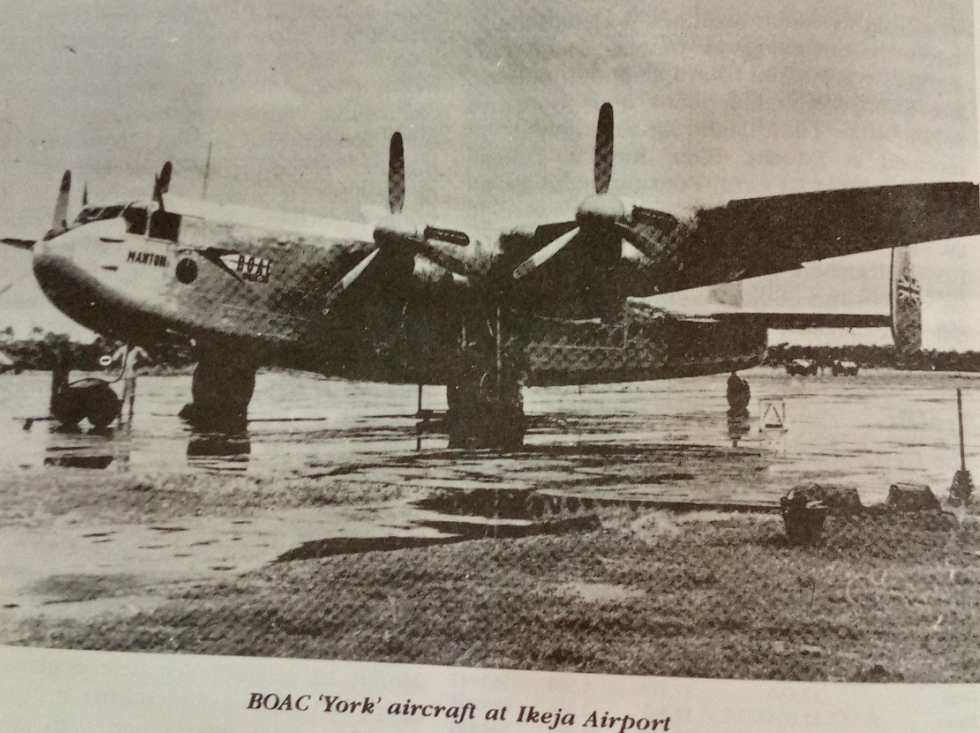
BOAC Avro York in Ikeja Airport

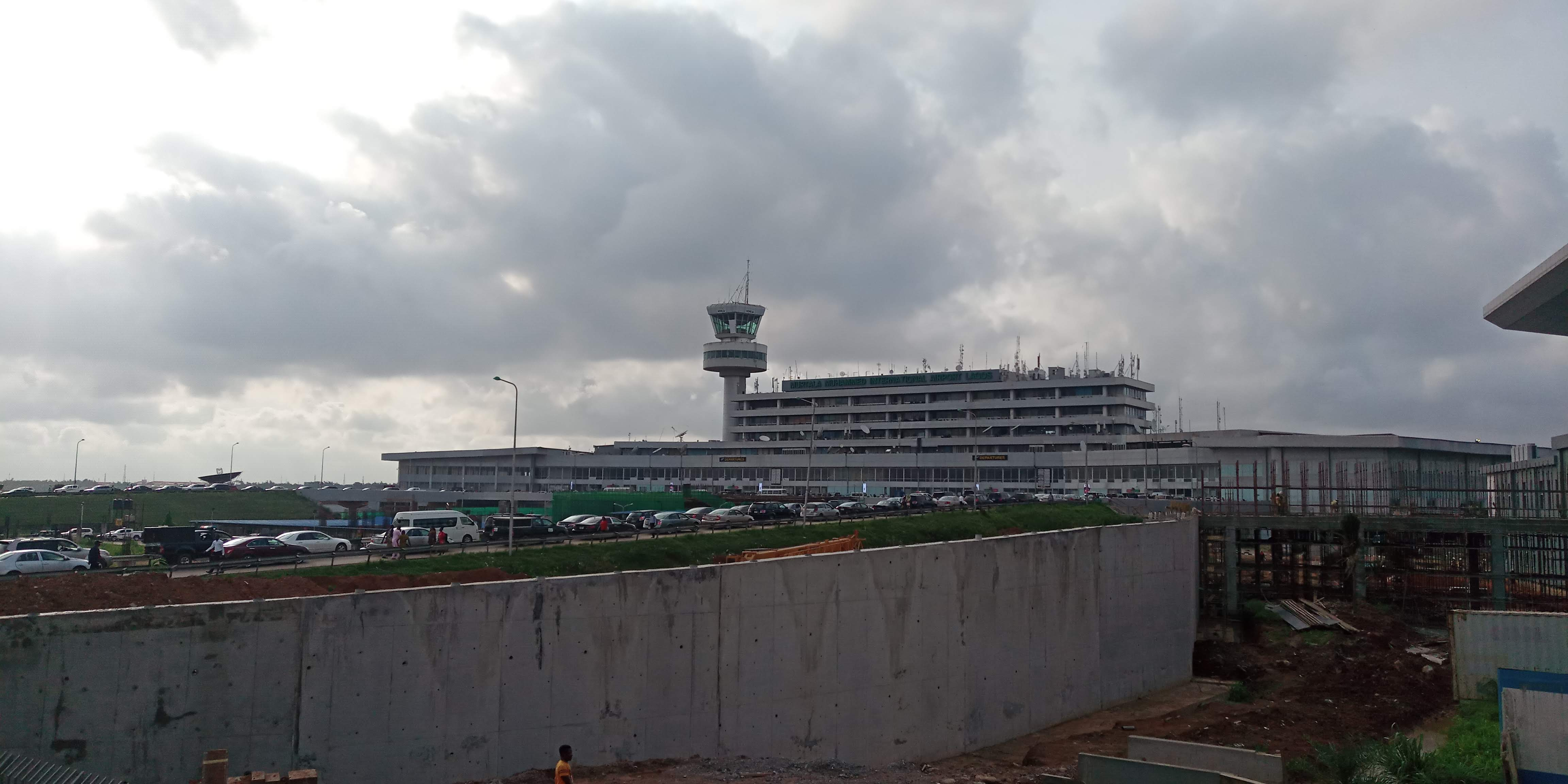
Exterior of 1979

Murtala Muhammed International Airport consists of an international and a domestic terminal, located about one kilometre from each other. Both terminals share the same runways. This domestic terminal used to be the old Ikeja Airport. International operations moved to the new international airport when it was ready while domestic operations moved to the Ikeja Airport, which became the domestic airport. The domestic operations were relocated to the old Lagos domestic terminal in 2000 after a fire. A new domestic privately funded terminal known as MMA2 has been constructed and was commissioned on 7 April 2007.

During the late 1980s and 1990s, the international terminal had a reputation for being dangerous. From 1992 through 2000, the US Federal Aviation Administration (FAA) posted warning signs in all US international airports advising travellers that security conditions at Lagos Airport did not meet ICAO minimum standards. In 1993, the FAA suspended air service between Lagos and the United States. The decision affected Nigeria Airways and American Trans Air.

Following Olusegun Obasanjo's democratic election in 1999, the security situation at Lagos began to improve. Airport police instituted a "shoot on sight" policy for anyone found in the secure areas around runways and taxiways, stopping further airplane robberies. Police secured the inside of the terminal and the arrival areas outside. The FAA ended its suspension of direct flights to Nigeria in 2001 in recognition of these security improvements. Through its joint venture with Nigeria Airways, South African Airways (SAA) inaugurated a flight from Johannesburg to New York via Lagos in February 2001. The airline reserved roughly a third of the seats on the Boeing 747 for Nigeria Airways. SAA terminated the service the following March, stating that it was unprofitable. The company added that in an attempt to increase passenger counts, they had tried to convince Nigeria Airways to accept a smaller seat allotment, but the latter refused. One month later, Nigeria Airways began their own route to New York with a leased Boeing 747. The airline had to suspend the flight in January 2003 because creditors had seized one of their last planes. In July 2006, North American Airlines launched nonstop service to New York using Boeing 767s.

By 2010, the FAA had granted the airport its highest safety rating. That year, the airport served 6,273,545 passengers.

Recent years have seen substantial improvements at Murtala Muhammed International Airport. Malfunctioning and non-operational infrastructures such as air conditioning and luggage belts have been repaired. The entire airport has been cleaned, and many new restaurants and duty-free stores have opened. Bilateral Air Services Agreements signed between Nigeria and other countries are being revived and new ones signed. These agreements have seen the likes of Emirates, Ocean Air, Delta and China Southern Airlines express interest and receive landing rights to Nigeria's largest international airport.

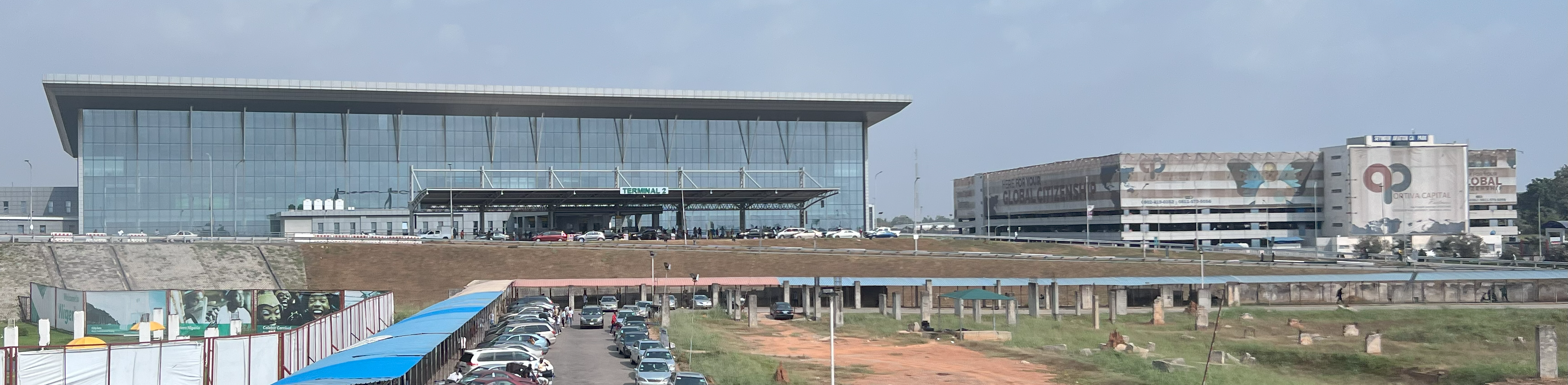
Terminal 2 and new garage

On 6 September 2012, then Minister of Aviation, Stella Oduah, announced that the Federal Government of Nigeria approved a N106 billion loan from the Exim Bank of China to construct 5 new international terminals, including a passenger terminal in Murtala Muhammed International Airport. Construction began in late 2013, and the new international terminal was commissioned by President Muhammadu Buhari on 22 March 2022. The new terminal has the capacity to process 14 million passengers annually. Initially, most airlines did not move their flights to the new terminal as the apron did not have enough space for larger planes to taxi to the gate with the terminal's layout. In response, the Federal Airports Authority of Nigeria announced that it would demolish two private hangars to increase the apron space and successfully ordered all airlines to shift to the new terminal by October 2023, stating that the move was necessary to renovate the old terminal.

A renovation of the old international terminal (Terminal 1) began in August 2025, with a planned cost of over 700b naira over the 22-month construction period.

== Airlines and destinations ==
=== Passenger ===
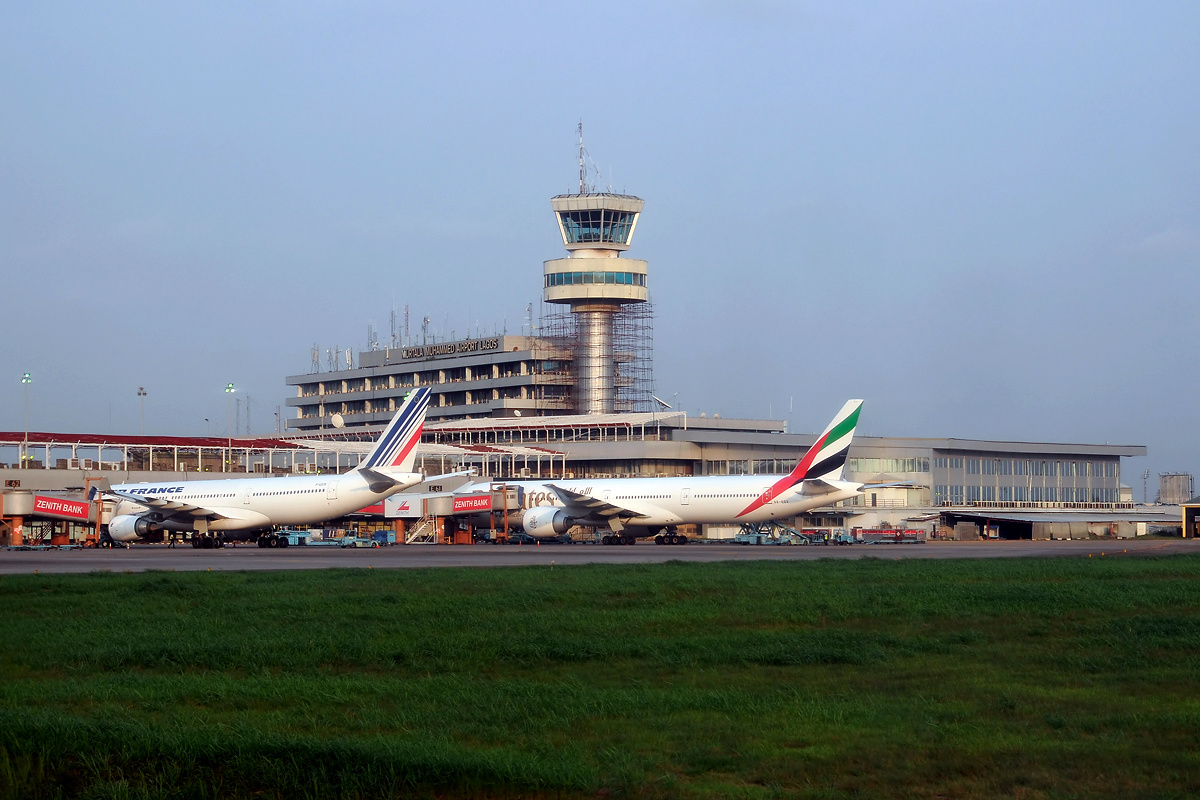
The main apron area of the airport

Airlines	Destinations
Aero Contractors	Abuja, Asaba, Benin City, Calabar, Enugu, Kano, Owerri, Port Harcourt, Uyo
Africa World Airlines	Accra
Air Côte d'Ivoire	Abidjan, Johannesburg–O. R. Tambo, Libreville
Air France	Paris–Charles de Gaulle
Air Peace	Abidjan, Abuja, Accra, Akure, Asaba, Benin City, Calabar, Cotonou, Dakar–Diass, Douala, Enugu, Freetown, Ibadan, Ilorin, Kano, Kebbi, London–Gatwick, Monrovia–Roberts, Onitsha, Owerri, Port Harcourt, Uyo, Warri; Charter: Antigua, Barbados
Air Sierra Leone	Freetown
Air Tanzania	Dar es Salaam
Arik Air	Abuja, Asaba, Benin City, Calabar, Enugu, Jos, Kaduna, Kano, Owerri, Port Harcourt, Uyo, Warri
ASKY Airlines	Douala, Kinshasa–N'djili, Libreville, Lomé
Azman Air	Abuja, Kano
British Airways	London–Heathrow
Delta Air Lines	Atlanta; Seasonal: New York–JFK
Egyptair	Cairo
Emirates	Dubai–International
Enugu Air	Abuja, Enugu, Owerri
Ethiopian Airlines	Addis Ababa
Etihad Airways	Abu Dhabi (resumes 18 March 2027)
Green Africa Airways	Abuja, Akure, Enugu, Ilorin, Owerri, Port Harcourt
Ibom Air	Abuja, Accra, Calabar, Enugu, Uyo
Kenya Airways	Nairobi–Jomo Kenyatta
KLM	Amsterdam
Lufthansa	Frankfurt, Malabo
Max Air	Abuja, Kano, Port Harcourt
Middle East Airlines	Abidjan, Beirut
Neos	Milan–Malpensa
Qatar Airways	Doha
Royal Air Maroc	Casablanca
Rwandair	Kigali
South African Airways	Johannesburg–O. R. Tambo
TAAG Angola Airlines	Luanda–Agostinho Neto
Turkish Airlines	Istanbul
Uganda Airlines	Entebbe
United Airlines	Washington–Dulles
United Nigeria Airlines	Abuja, Accra, Asaba, Enugu, Onitsha, Yenagoa
ValueJet	Abuja, Banjul, Benin City, Jos, Port Harcourt
Virgin Atlantic	London–Heathrow

=== Cargo ===
Airlines	Destinations
Air France Cargo	N'Djamena, Paris–Charles de Gaulle
Allied Air	Ostend/Bruges
Cargolux	Luxembourg
DHL Aviation	Accra, Bamako, Brussels, Cotonou, Malabo
Emirates SkyCargo	Dubai–Al Maktoum
Ethiopian Airlines Cargo	Accra, Addis Ababa, Chongqing, Kigali, Liège, London–Heathrow, Miami, Santiago de Chile
Lufthansa Cargo	Frankfurt, Johannesburg–O.R. Tambo
Qatar Airways Cargo	Doha, São Paulo–Guarulhos
Saudia Cargo	Dubai–Al Maktoum, Jeddah, Nairobi–Jomo Kenyatta, Riyadh, Sharjah
Turkish Cargo	Dubai–Al Maktoum, Istanbul

== Other facilities ==
The airport includes the headquarters of the Federal Airports Authority of Nigeria. The Lagos office of the Nigerian Civil Aviation Authority is located in Aviation House on the grounds of the airport.

Arik Air's head office is in the Arik Air Aviation Center on the grounds of the airport. Aero Contractors has its head office in the Private Terminal of the Domestic Wing at Murtala Muhammed International Airport.

At one time Nigeria Airways had its head office in Airways House on the airport property. Prior to its disestablishment Afrijet Airlines had its head office in the NAHCO Aviance Building on the grounds of the airport.

Previously the airport housed the head offices of the Nigerian Civil Aviation Authority and the Accident Investigation Bureau..

== Statistics ==
These data show the number of passengers movements into the airport, according to the Federal Airports Authority of Nigeria's Aviation Sector Summary Reports.

Year	2011	2012	2013	2014	2015	2016	2017	2018	2019	2020	2021	2022
Passengers	6,746,290	6,879,286	7,261,178	7,374,507	7,164,169	6,694,747	6,553,151	7,290,530	7,496,318	4,110,395	5,689,234	6,526,023
Growth (%)	▲7.54%	▲1.97%	▲5.55%	▲1.56%	▼2.8%	▼7.1%	▼2.16%	▲11.2%	▲2.8%	▼45.17%	▲38.41%	▲14.71%
Source: Federal Airports Authority of Nigeria (FAAN). Aviation Sector Reports (2010–2013, 2014, Q3-Q4 of 2015, and Q1-Q2 of 2016,)

== Accidents and incidents ==
- On 20 November 1969, Nigeria Airways Flight 925 crashed while on approach to Murtala Muhammed International Airport. All 87 passengers and crew on board were killed.
- Early in 1981, a Douglas C-47B of Arax Airlines (registration 5N-ARA) was damaged beyond repair in an accident and was subsequently reduced to spares.
- On 26 September 1992, a Nigerian Air Force C-130 Hercules crashed three minutes after take-off in the nearby Ejigbo canal. Three engines failed, high take-off weight. All 158 people on board were killed.
- On 7 November 1996, ADC Airlines Flight 086, a Boeing 727-231 was approaching the airport whilst avoiding a potential collision. The 727 pilots took evasive action but overcompensated: within sixteen seconds the plane was flying upside down approaching Mach 1. The inverted aircraft disintegrated on impact, near Ejirin, killing all 144 passengers and crew.
- On 22 October 2005, Bellview Airlines Flight 210, bound for Abuja, crashed after takeoff, killing all 117 people on board.
- On 3 June 2012, Dana Air Flight 0992 crashed in close proximity of the airport. The plane, a McDonnell Douglas MD-83, banked sharply while attempting to land at Lagos, subsequently crashing in the nearby residential area of Agege, killing all 153 passengers and crew on board and six others on the ground.
- On 3 October 2013, Associated Aviation Flight 361 crashed shortly after takeoff. The plane was an Embraer EMB 120 Brasilia. 16 people died and 4 people survived the incident.
- On 13 February 2018, Delta Air Lines Flight 55 en route to Hartsfield–Jackson Atlanta International Airport in Atlanta, Georgia, suffered a fire, which was caught in the left-hand engine. The Airbus A330-223 aircraft stopped its climb at 2,000 feet and activated the fire suppression, returning to Lagos for a safe landing about 8 minutes after departure. The aircraft was evacuated, and 5 people received minor injuries during the evacuation.
- On 15 May 2019, an Air Peace Boeing 737 from Port Harcourt to Lagos suffered a hard landing on runway 18R that resulted in damage to the engine pod and the landing gear. The aircraft was grounded, although no injuries were reported.
- On 16 February 2021, an Azman Air Boeing 737 from Abuja to Lagos blew several main tyres upon landing on runway 18R. The aircraft was disabled and the runway closed overnight until the wreckage could be removed.
- On 23 February 2026, a fire broke out at a server room on the first floor of Terminal 1, injuring six people and causing the airspace to be temporarily closed over the city. The departure hall, which was undergoing renovation at the time, was damaged, while 14 people were rescued after being trapped in the control tower.

== See also ==
- Admiralty Circle Plaza
- Lekki-Epe International Airport – proposed second airport for Lagos
- List of airports in Nigeria
- Transport in Nigeria
