= Chinua Achebe International Airport =

Airport serving Anambra State, Nigeria

Chinua Achebe International Airport Umueri
- IATA: CHE; ICAO: DNAN

Summary
- Airport type: Public
- Owner: Anambra State Government
- Operator: Anambra Airport City Infrastructure Limited
- Serves: Anambra
- Location: Umueri
- Opened: 30 October 2021; 5 years ago
- Hub for: Air Peace
- Time zone: WAT (UTC+01:00)
- Coordinates: 6.27026°N 6.87761°E
- Interactive map of Chinua Achebe International Airport Umueri

Runways
Direction	Length		Surface
Direction	m	ft	Surface
06L/24R	3,700	12,139	Asphalt

Statistics (January 2022)
- Passengers: 11,860
- Aircraft movements: 376
- Land Area: 1,901 ha (4,700 acres)

Chinua Achebe International Airport (formerly Anambra State International Cargo Airport) (IATA: CHE, ICAO: DNAN) is an international airport in Umueri, Anambra State, Nigeria. The airport serves Anambra State, especially the Onitsha metropolis which includes the capital city Awka.

== History ==
The project to build the airport was officially launched by the Anambra State government on 11 April 2017, with construction finishing three years later. The airport was then inaugurated by Anambra State's Governor Willie Obiano on 30 October 2021.

On 2 December 2021, the Nigerian Civil Aviation Authority issued the Anambra State Government the authority to open the airport for commercial operations, after which the airport began commercial operations on 7 December 2021. In its first month of operations, it had recorded 142 flights carrying a total of 3,865 passengers.

In March 2022, a Ziegler fire truck was delivered to the airport.

On 1 October 2023, the airport was renamed after Chinua Achebe, an author, poet and critic from Anambra State. Presently, the airport is known as Chinua Achebe International Airport, Umueri.

== Airlines and destinations ==
Airlines	Destinations	Refs
Air Peace	Abuja, Lagos	
United Nigeria Airlines	Abuja, Lagos	

The airport located at Umueri, in Anambra East LGA of Anambra state, serves a lot of the neighboring states because it is a cargo airport, also. The roads that lead to the airport is motorable. Two airlines are currently functional here: Air Peace and United Nigeria Airlines.
