= Arik Air =

Nigerian airline based in Lagos, operating domestic and regional services

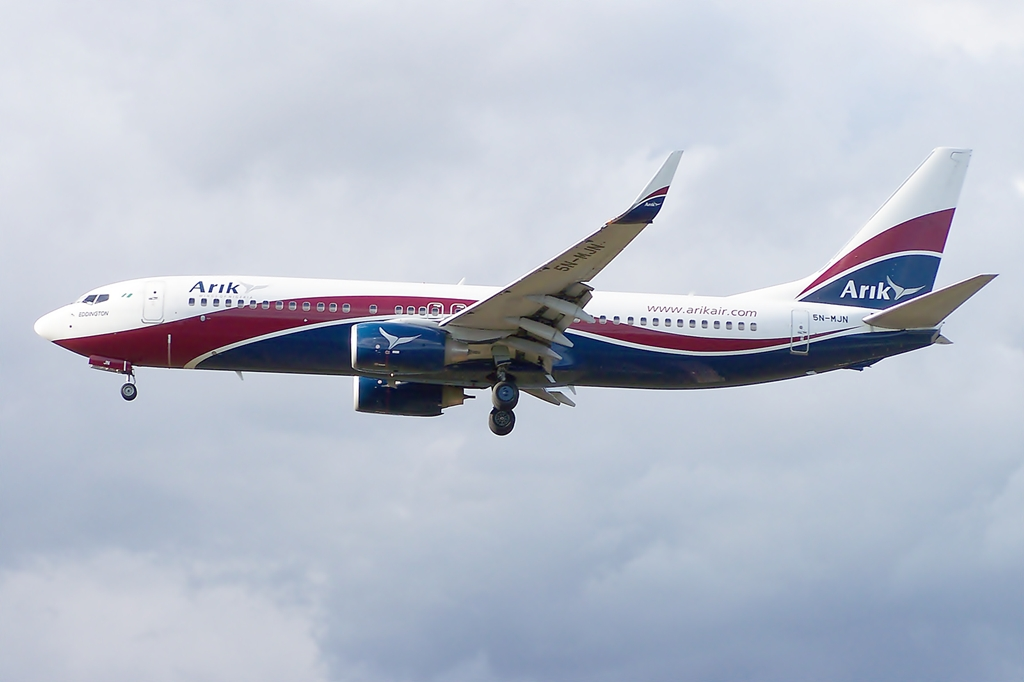
IATA	ICAO	Call sign
W3	ARA	ARIK AIR
- Founded: 2002
- Commenced operations: 30 October 2006
- Hubs: Murtala Muhammed International Airport; Nnamdi Azikiwe International Airport
- Focus cities: Accra International Airport
- Frequent-flyer program: Arik Affinity Wings
- Fleet size: 10
- Destinations: 16
- Parent company: Asset Management Corporation of Nigeria
- Headquarters: Ikeja, Lagos State, Nigeria
- Key people: Capt. Roy Ilegbodu
- Website: www.arikair.com

Arik Air is a Nigerian airline operating mainly from two hubs at Murtala Muhammed International Airport in Lagos and Nnamdi Azikiwe International Airport in Abuja. Arik Air's head office is the Arik Air Aviation Center on the grounds of Murtala Muhammed International Airport in Ikeja. Arik Air serves a network of regional and mid-haul destinations within Africa.

== History ==
=== Early years ===
The company was created in 2004 by Joseph Arumemi-Ikhide from the ashes of Nigeria Airways, which was liquidated in 2002.

In August 2006, the Federal Ministry of Aviation granted Arik Air authorisation to fly to Trinidad and Tobago in the Caribbean and Amsterdam, London and Madrid in Europe. Furthermore, the airline then planned to fly to Atlanta, Miami, and Houston in the United States and Birmingham in the United Kingdom.

On 4 April 2008, Arik Air was given permission to fly to the United States by the US Department of Transportation. Arik Air started international operations to London-Heathrow on 15 December 2008, using an Airbus A340-500 aircraft wet-leased from Hi Fly. It added to its destinations Johannesburg on 1 June 2009, New York JFK on 30 November 2009, and Dubai on 28 July 2014.

Subsidiary airline Arik Niger (IATA code: Q9) commenced operations in April 2009, but was shut down in February 2010.

=== Development since 2010 ===
Arik Air transported its 5 millionth passenger on 6 August 2010 and it transported its 10 millionth passenger on 18 September 2012, both on flights between Johannesburg and Lagos. On 20 September 2012, the airline cancelled all its domestic operations after aviation officials raided the airline's office in Lagos, Nigeria the national aviation authority's officials blocked check-in counters and chained doors leading to a boarding gate. Flights resumed on 23 September. Arik Air had placed an order for five Boeing 777-300ER aircraft, which was cancelled in 2011. Arik Air then placed an order for two Boeing 747-8I aircraft 2013. However, in early 2017, Arik Air converted the 747-8I orders to two Boeing 787-9 Dreamliners instead. Arik Air had been the last remaining airline customer for the passenger 747-8 (who had not yet received any examples). The conversion of the 747-8 order to Dreamliners came shortly after the airline, owing to major financial stress and most aircraft not being operational, was taken over by the Asset Management Corporation of Nigeria (AMCON) at the start of 2017, deeming the airline too big to fail. Since the takeover, all flights leaving Africa, along with flights to O.R. Tambo International Airport, have been gradually suspended. Simultaneously, KPMG was appointed by AMCON to conduct a forensic audit on Arik Air's books. Since then, AMCON is gradually in the process of reviving and stabilising the airline and its operations.

Due to Arik Air's debt, the airline is projected to merge with Aero Contractors. It has also been revealed that this new airline merger is to be re-branded as Nigeria Eagle (styled as NG Eagle), with some of the aircraft already re-painted to represent the new livery. It is speculated by many to be another attempt to re-establish a national airline by AMCON, even though they have officially dissociated any relations with the plans; stating that they were going to make a start-up airline.

== Fleet ==
=== Current fleet ===
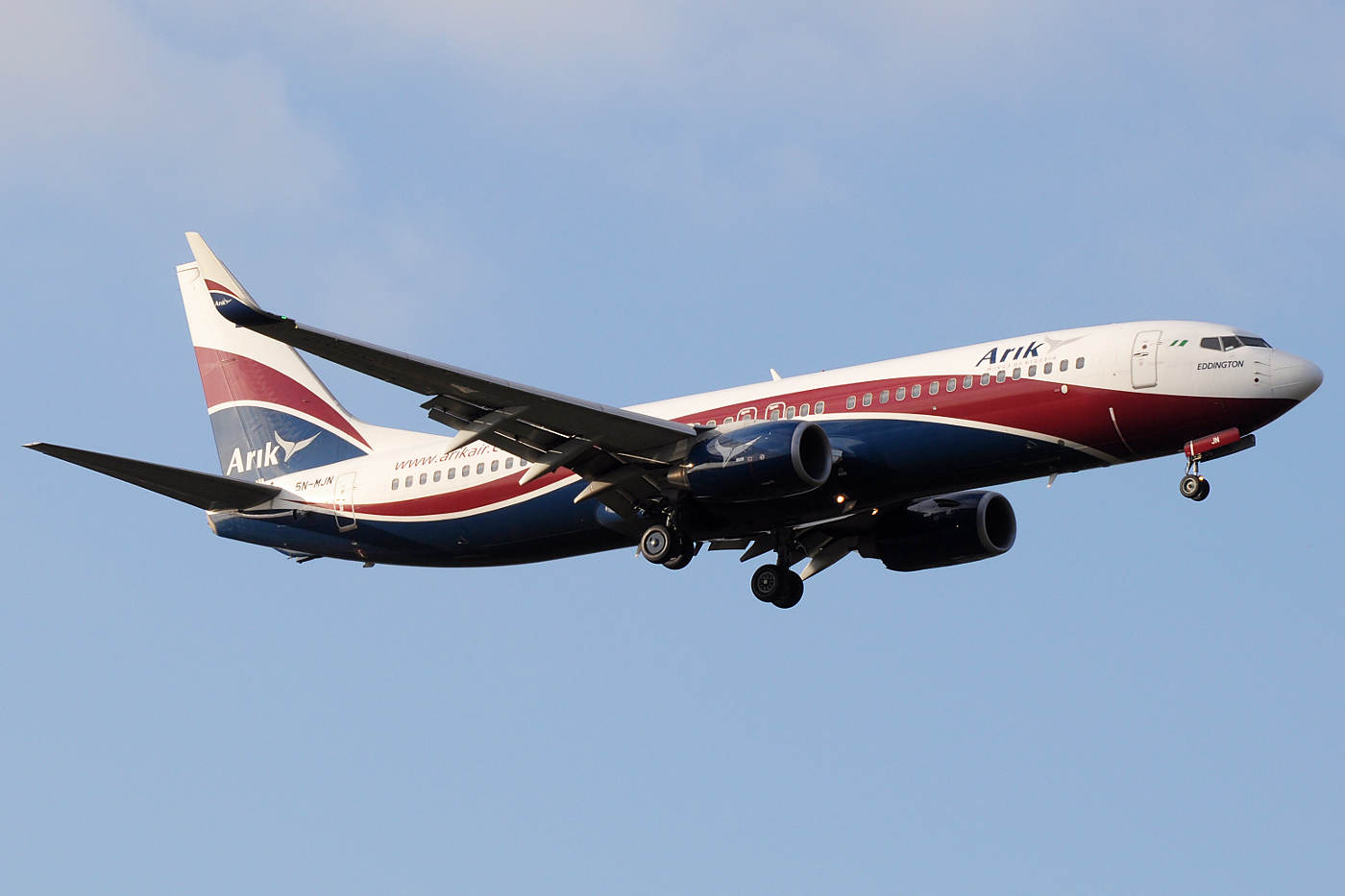
Arik Air Boeing 737-800

As of August 2025, Arik Air operates the following aircraft:

Arik Air fleet
Aircraft	In service	Orders	Passengers			Notes
Aircraft	In service	Orders	C	Y	Total	Notes
Boeing 737-700	5	—	12	112	124	
Boeing 737-700	5	—	12	119	131	
Boeing 737-700	5	—	—	149	149	
Boeing 737-800	2	—	16	132	148	
Boeing 737 MAX 8	—	8	TBA			Would be soon cancelled for merging
Boeing 787-9	—	9	TBA			Would be soon cancelled for merging
De Havilland Dash 8-400	3	—	10	62	72	
Total	10	17				

=== Former fleet ===
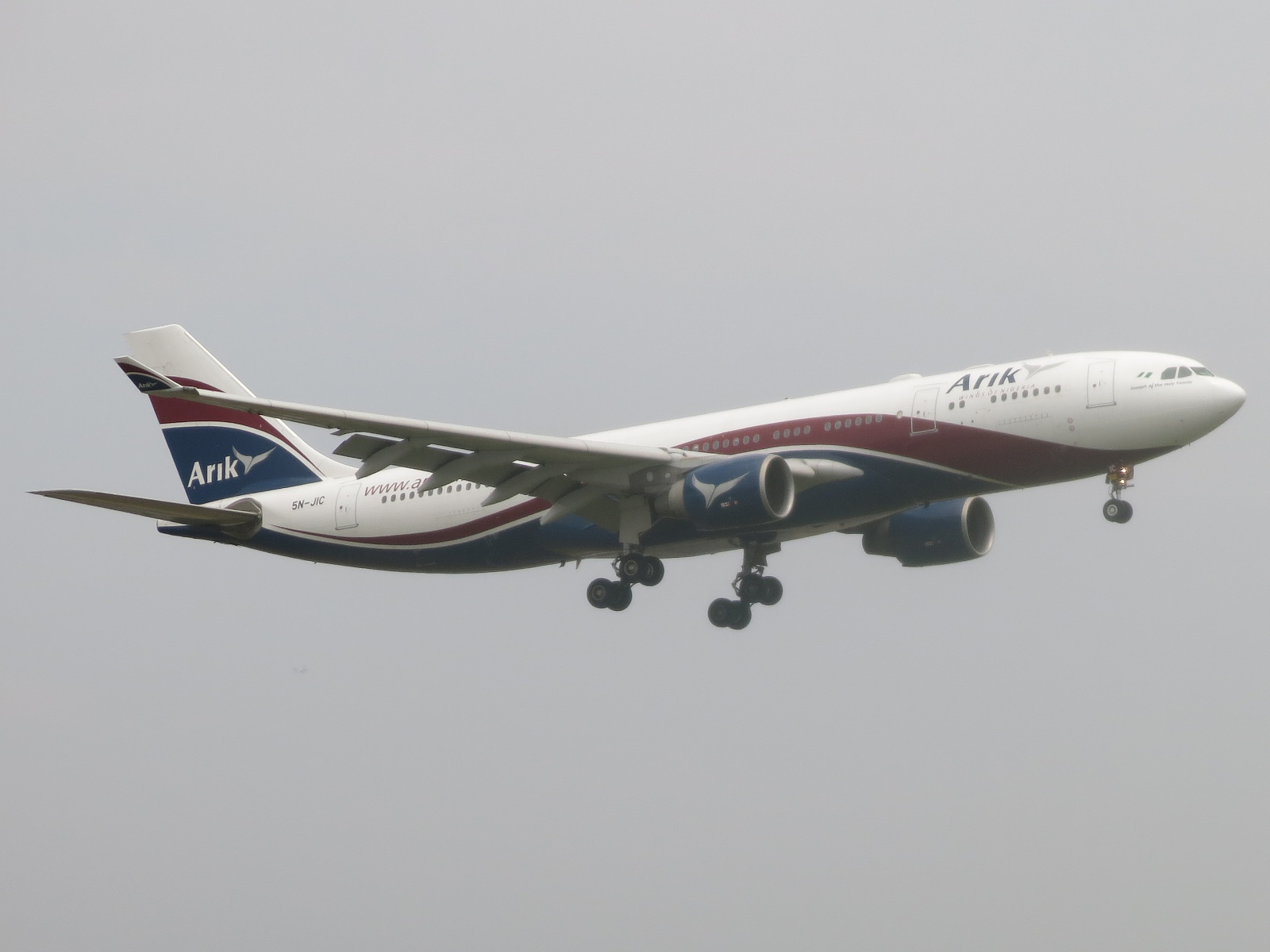
Former Arik Air Airbus A330-200

Arik Air previously operated the following aircraft:

Arik Air historical fleet
Aircraft	Total	Introduced	Retired	Notes
Airbus A330-200	4	2010	2017	
Airbus A340-500	2	2009	2015	Operated by Hi Fly.
Bombardier CRJ200ER	3	2007	2008	
Bombardier CRJ900	3			
De Havilland Canada DHC-8-300	3	2007	2010	Operated by Denim Air.
Fokker 50	5	2007	2011	Operated by Denim Air.

== Incidents and accidents ==
- On 31 March 2010, a presumably mentally ill man crashed his car through two security gates and into a parked Arik Air Boeing 737-700 at Calabar airport. The driver, who claimed to be Jesus Christ, said he did it as a desperate attempt to save the aircraft from an imminent collision. No one was hurt as a result of the incident and the aircraft did not suffer significant damage.
- On 8 March 2018, the pilot of Arik Air flight W3 304 from Lagos to Accra declared an emergency when an unknown source of smoke was detected in the cabin 81 miles (70 nmi; 130 km) from their destination. The Bombardier Dash 8 Q400 landed safely in Ghana and no passenger or crew member was injured as a result of the incident.
- On 11 February 2026, a Boeing 737-700, operating as Arik Air Flight 740 suffered an uncontained left engine failure midair. The left wing and the vertical and horizontal stabilizers were severely damaged. The aircraft made an emergency landing, no injuries among 80 people on board were reported and all passengers disembarked safely.

== See also ==
- Transport in Nigeria
- Airlines of Africa
