= Transport in Nigeria =

Nigeria's transport network has expanded in recent years to accommodate a growing population. The transport and storage sector was valued at N2.6trn ($6.9bn) in current basic prices in 2020, down from N3trn ($8bn) in 2019, according to the National Bureau of Statistics (NBS). This was reflected in a lower contribution to GDP, at 1.8% in the fourth quarter of 2020, down from 2.1% during the same period the previous year but higher than the 0.8% recorded in the third quarter of 2020. One of the most significant challenges facing the sector is meeting the needs of both large coastal cities and rural inland communities in order to fully unlock the country's economic potential. This is especially the case with mining and agriculture, both of which are expected to benefit from two large-scale projects: the Lekki Port in Lagos and the Kano-Maradi rail line in the north of the country.

Although transport networks have historically been underfunded, the government is prioritising their development, as enhanced connectivity is key to supporting growth in non-oil sectors such as manufacturing and agriculture. This will help the country diversify its sources of income away from oil, and connect rural and underserved communities to commercial centres. Moreover, planned intra-city mass transit projects are expected to improve the quality of life for Nigeria's 102.8m urban residents.

== Railways ==
Improving rail links is also central to the NIIMP, with the master plan noting at the time that the network "needs to be almost completely rehabilitated or rebuilt". The longer-term vision is to expand routes to create a multi-modal system linked with facilities such as ports and airports. The prioritisation of rail development has continued, with the 2021 budget earmarking N71.2bn ($3.2m) for the construction and N11.6bn ($31m) for the rehabilitation of railways.

The NRC is responsible for rail services across the country – both for freight and passengers – with little participation from the private sector, as most intercity rail routes are not commercially viable. According to the latest data from the NBS, the rail system carried 2.6m passengers in 2017, 3m in 2018 and 723,995 in the first quarter of 2019. Revenue generated from passenger tickets amounted to N1.2bn ($3.2m) and N1.9bn ($5.1m) for 2017 and 2018, respectively, and N520.8m ($1.4m) for the first three months of 2019. In terms of cargo, 141,186 tonnes were moved in 2017 for a revenue of N374m ($999,000) – figures that grew by 132% and 32%, respectively, in 2018. Some 54,100 tonnes were moved by the rail system in the first quarter of 2019, generating revenue of N102.6m ($274,000).

In August 2017 the federal government announced a $41bn programme to expand the rail network. The two headline projects unveiled at the time were a second railway connecting Lagos in the south to Kano in the north and a railway spanning the coast, from Lagos to Calabar. Work on both projects was ongoing as of early 2021. Moreover, in January of that year construction began on a new line linking Kano to Maradi, in neighbouring Niger. The 387-km line will pass through Kazaure, Daura, Katsina and Jibiya, and a 93-km branch from Kano to Dutse will facilitate traffic from Jigawa State. The second Lagos-Kano line is intended to connect with the new Kano-Maradi artery, eventually creating an uninterrupted network across Nigeria.

== Roads ==
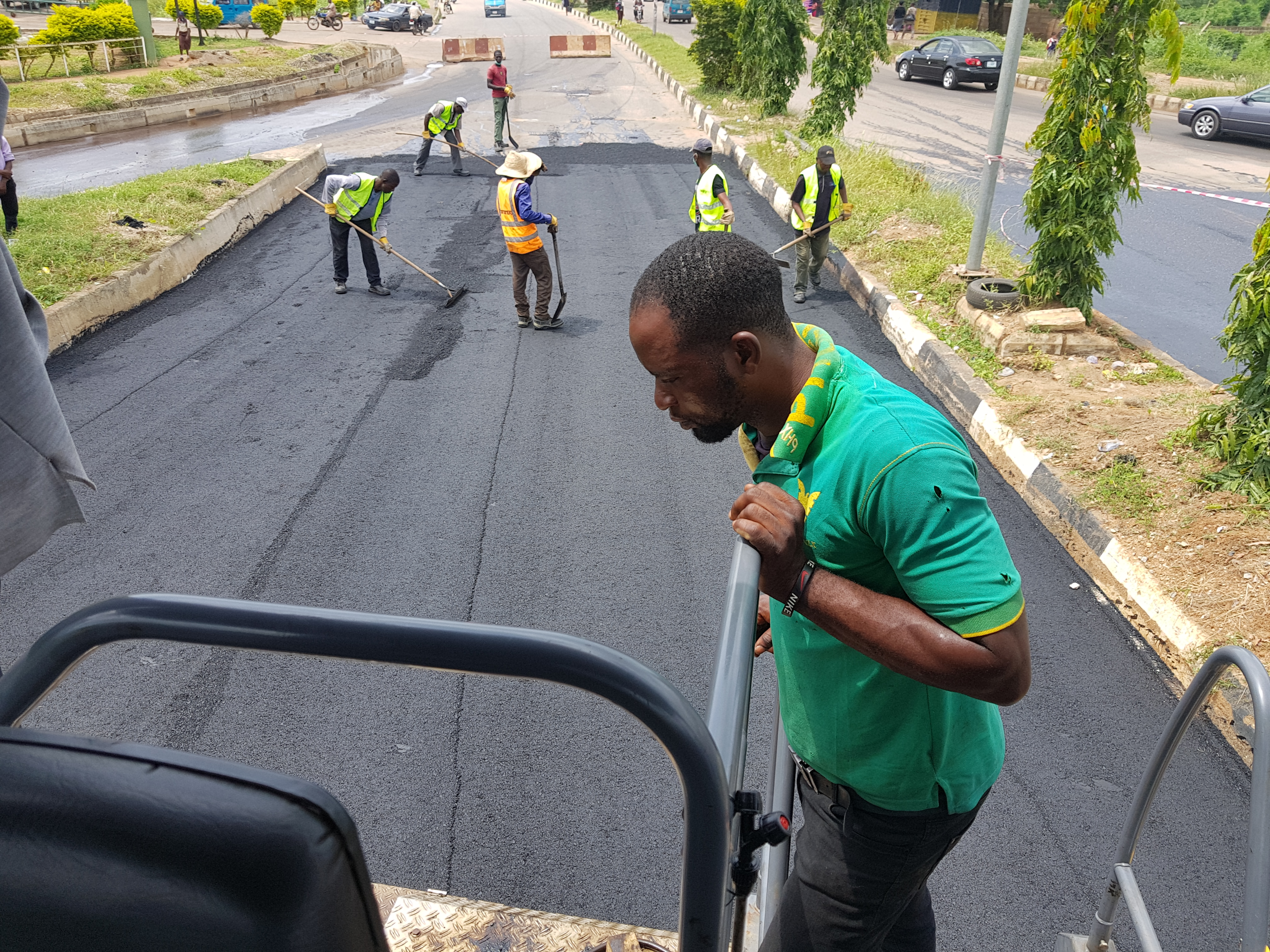
Road maintenance in Nigeria

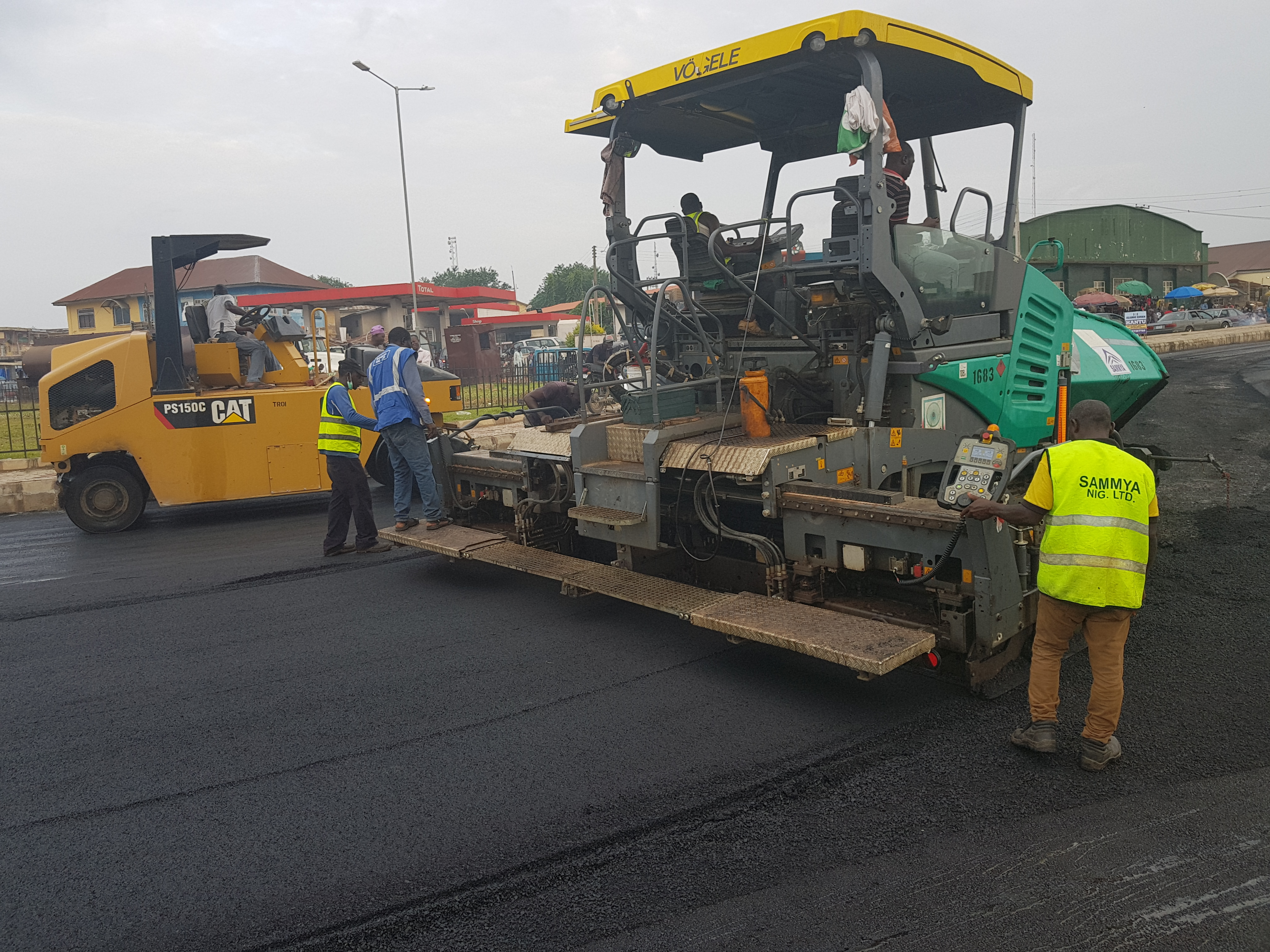
Road construction in Nigeria

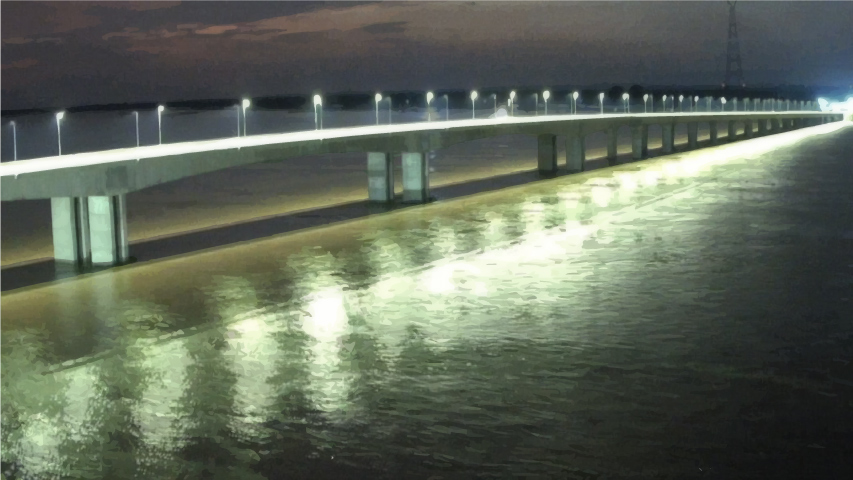
The Second Niger Bridge

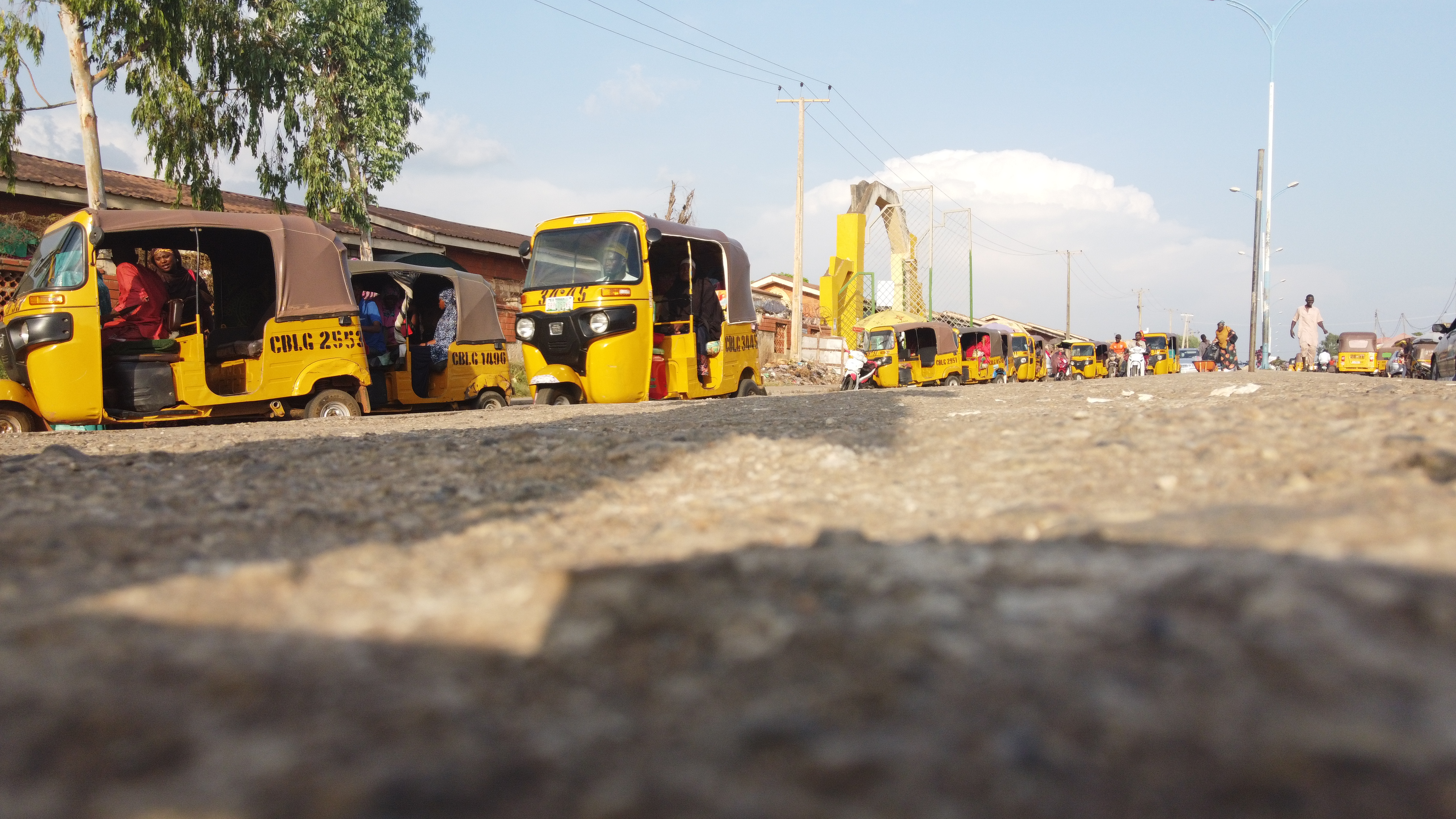
Tricycles (Keke Napep) are commonplace in many northern cities of Nigeria.

Nigeria's roads and highways form the backbone of the country's transport network, as these arteries handle 90% of all passenger and freight traffic, according to the NIIMP. As it is the largest segment – contributing N2.4trn ($6.4bn) to GDP in 2020, down from N2.7trn ($7.2bn) the year before – the government is focused on both servicing existing roads – many of which are in poor condition or unpaved – and constructing new ones. Towards this end, the 2021 budget earmarked N168bn ($451.2m) for the construction, rehabilitation and dualisation of roads. The package also set aside N54bn ($144.2m) for building and renovating bridges, and N4bn ($10.7m) specifically for the rehabilitation of a mainland bridge in Lagos.

One key project is the rehabilitation and expansion of the 35-km Apapa-Oshodi-Oworonshoki-Ojota Expressway in Lagos, linking the city’s largest port to the Ojata district. As vehicle ownership is on the rise, traffic is common in the country’s most populous city. In January 2021 Funso Adebiyi, director of highway construction and rehabilitation at the Ministry of Works and Housing, told local press that the first phase of the project was set to be completed in April of that year, with the entirety of the expansion delivered in December. Nigerian conglomerate Dangote Group began work on the expressway in 2018, and the overhaul is the artery’s first since it was built in 1978, with the group adding 10 lanes and repairing connections with other roads. Another priority project was the 43-km Obajana-Kabba link in Kogi State. Completed in January 2021, it is Nigeria’s largest concrete road and links the north and south of the country. As concrete is more durable than asphalt, it is less susceptible to potholes and, as such, requires less maintenance.

The government has worked to attract private partners and investment to carry out and finance key projects. For example, the Dangote Group received a 10-year tax rebate worth N73bn ($194.9m) for the Apapa-Oshodi-Oworonshoki-Ojota Expressway as part of a government programme to offer incentives such as tax breaks to private companies to help execute necessary roadworks. Moreover, in May 2020 the government issued its third sukuk (Islamic bond), worth N162.6bn ($434.1m), to fund infrastructure projects such as road rehabilitation.

In 2024, the federal government of Nigeria started the construction of a 700km coastal highway from Lagos - Calabar, which will pass through nine states and reduce travel times among them.

=== International highways ===
Nigeria's strategic location and size results in four routes of the Trans-African Highway network using its national road system:

- The Trans-Sahara Highway to Algeria is almost complete but border security issues may hamper its use in the short term.
- The Trans-Sahelian Highway to Dakar is substantially complete.
- The Trans–West African Coastal Highway starts in Nigeria, connecting it westwards to Benin, Togo, Ghana and Ivory Coast with feeder highways to landlocked Burkina Faso and Mali. When construction in Liberia and Sierra Leone is finished, the highway will continue seven other Economic Community of West African States (ECOWAS) nations further west.
- The Lagos-Mombasa Highway has been awaited for many decades to kick-start trade across the continent. It does provide improved highway links to neighbouring Cameroon, but its continuation across DR Congo to East Africa is lacking, as are highways from Cameroon to Central Africa and Southern Africa, which could boost trade within the continent.

== Waterways ==
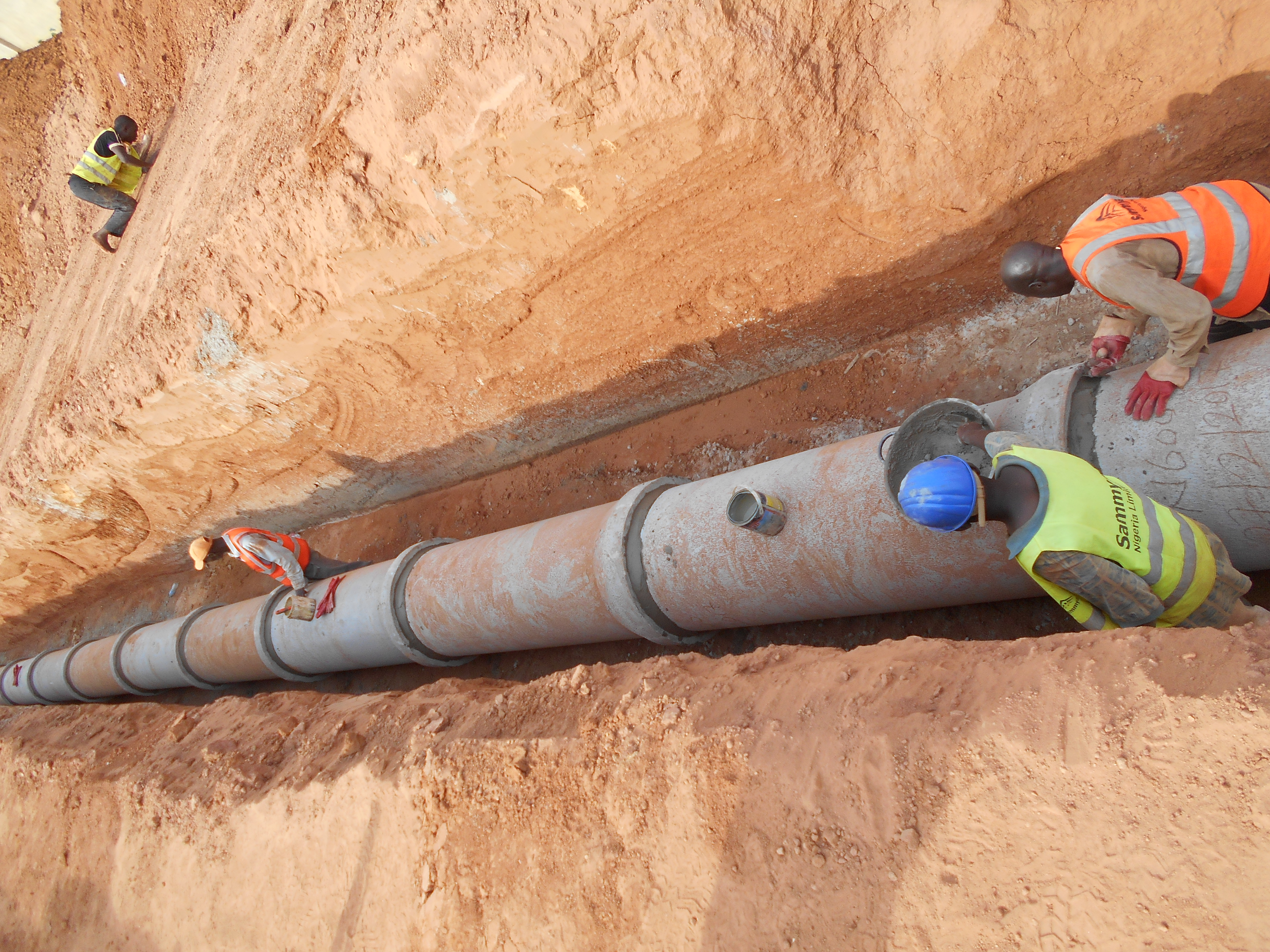
Installation of storm water drainage in Nigeria

Nigeria has 8,600 km of inland waterways. The longest are the Niger River and its tributary, the Benue River, but the most used, especially by larger powered boats and for commerce, are in the Niger Delta and all along the coast from Lagos Lagoon to Cross River.

== Pipelines ==
In 2004 Nigeria had 105 km (65 mi) of pipelines for condensates, 1,896 km (1,178 mi) for natural gas, 3,638 km (2,261 mi) for oil, and 3,626 km (2,253 mi) for refined products. Various pipeline projects are planned to expand the domestic distribution of natural gas and to export natural gas to Benin, Ghana, Togo through the West African Gas Pipeline, and, potentially, even to Algeria (where Mediterranean export terminals are located) by proposed Trans-Saharan gas pipeline. Energy pipelines are subject to sabotage by militant groups or siphoning by thieves.

== Ports and harbors ==
The six Nigerian seaports are:

- Apapa Port and Tin Can Island Port in Lagos State;
- Onne Port and Port Harcourt in Rivers State;
- Warri Port in Delta State
- Calabar Port in Cross River State

According to the most recent data published by the Nigerian Port Authority (NPA), inbound tonnage across all ports expanded from around 9m tonnes in 2016 to 10.4m in 2017 and 10.9m in 2018, with the first quarter of 2019 recording 2.8m tonnes. Outbound tonnage over the same period also rose, from 2.1m in 2016 to 2.3m in 2017 and 2.4m in 2018. Nigerian ports shipped out some 487,000 tonnes in the first three months of 2019.

One notable maritime project is the Lekki Port, located in the Lagos Free Trade Zone. Slated to be Nigeria’s first deepsea port and the deepest such facility in sub-Saharan Africa, work on Lekki began in March 2018 and is targeted to be complete in 2022. The port will help meet rising demand for containers in Nigeria, the compound annual growth rate of which is forecast to be 12.9% between 2016 and 2025. It will also create 170,000 jobs and bring the government $200bn in revenue, according to Lekki Port LFTZ Enterprise, the port’s developer. This would leave the city with a capacity shortfall of 5.5m twenty-foot equivalent units (TEUs) by 2025. The deepsea port will have a capacity of 2.7m TEUs per year, with three container berths, three liquid berths and one dry bulk berth. The draught will be 16.5 metres with a 600-metre turning circle.

Lekki Port LFTZ Enterprise is a joint venture between the Lagos State government, the NPA and Lekki Port Investment Holdings, a group of investors including China Harbour Engineering Company and Singapore-headquartered holding company Tolaram Group. Unlike in rail, the private sector plays a notable role in the port segment. The privatisation of port operations began in late 2003, and today the private sector is active in areas such as cargo handling, warehousing, the development and maintenance of port structures, safety and security within the terminals, and towing, mooring, bunkering and repairing ships.

The port was commissioned by President Muhammadu Buhari in January 2023 and began commercial operations in April 2023, becoming Nigeria's first operational deep-water port; its container facility, the Lekki Freeport Terminal, is operated by the French shipping group CMA CGM through its subsidiary CMA Terminals.

In May 2022, the new Dala Dry Port opened for business, close to Kano. The dry port will take over tasks from Nigeria's sea ports. It has the capacity of 20.000 TEUs.

== Bridges ==
Thirty-seven bridges nationwide underwent maintenance and repairs in 2022, some of which had been due for decades. Among these is the bridge from the mainland to Bonny Island, from which the crude oil of the same name is loaded. Others are the Loko-Oweto bridge project, the Third Mainland Bridge in Lagos, the Murtala Mohammed Bridge in Koton Karfi and the Isaac Boro Bridge in Port Harcourt. Others include Chanchangi Bridge in Niger State and the Tambuwara Bridge in Kano. After decades of political discussions, the Second Niger bridge was nearing completion, as of January 2022.

== Merchant marine ==
The Nigerian Merchant Navy is not a legally recognized body, but the senior officers are represented by the Merchant Navy Officers' and Water Transport Senior Staff Association. The maritime industry is regulated by the Nigerian Maritime Administration and Safety Agency (NIMASA), which is responsible for regulations related to Nigerian shipping, maritime labor and coastal waters. The agency also undertakes inspections and provides search and rescue services.

total: 40 ships (1,000 gross tonnage (GT) or over) totaling 360,505 GT/644,471 tonnes deadweight (DWT)
ships by type: bulk carrier 1, cargo ship 12, chemical tanker 4, petroleum tanker 22, specialized tanker 1 (1999 est.)

== Airport and airlines ==
Nigeria's principal airports are Murtala Muhammed International Airport in Lagos and Nnamdi Azikiwe International Airport in Abuja. Three other international airports are Mallam Aminu Kano International Airport in Kano, Akanu Ibiam International Airport in Enugu and Port Harcourt International Airport in Port Harcourt.

The air transport industry was particularly affected by the pandemic, as many countries closed their borders at various points throughout 2020 to reduce the spread of the virus. Nigeria’s aviation segment entered the pandemic in a relatively strong position, according to FAAN. Arrivals to Nigeria’s 30-some airports totalled 8.8m in 2019, while 8.7m departures were logged. This represented a 7.4% increase from the 16.4m total passenger movements recorded in 2018. Meanwhile, cargo traffic grew in 2019 – from 164.9m kg in 2018 kg to 174.9m kg – while mail by air rose from 47.3m kg to 55.6m kg. The domestic terminals of airports in Abuja and Lagos accounted for 25% of passenger movements and 30% of aircraft movements each in 2019, while Murtala Muhammed International Airport (MMIA) in Lagos handled 81% of all cargo.

Priority aviation projects in the 2021 budget include N10bn ($26.7m) for a second runway at Nnamdi Azikiwe International Airport (NAIA) in Abuja, N1bn ($2.7m) for a new terminal building at the airport in Enugu, and N900m ($2.4m) for extending and repaving the runway at MMIA. Laying a second runway at NAIA follows the December 2018 opening of the new international terminal. The terminal is the first in the country to be connected to a rail system, with Abuja’s light rail train taking passengers to the city centre.
