= List of airline codes (E) =

This is a list of all airline codes. The table lists the IATA airline designators, the ICAO airline designators and the airline call signs (telephony designator). Historical assignments are also included for completeness.

== Codes ==
Airline codes
IATA	ICAO	Airline	Call sign	Country	Comments
	EAV	Eagle Airlines Luftverkehrsges	MAYFLOWER	Austria	
	ABU	Eagle Aviation Services		United States	
	ISL	Eastland Air Services (Flugfélag Austurlands)	EASTLAND	Iceland	2022
	EBF	Echo Airlines		Bahamas	2014
MQ	ENY	Envoy Air	ENVOY	United States	2014
	ENK	Executive Airlink	SUNBIRD	United States	Allocated in 2014
EL	ELB	Ellinair	ELLINAIR HELLAS	Greece	
	ELN	Eleron Aviation Company	ELERON	Ukraine	
	ECC	Eclair Aviation	ECLAIR	Czech Republic	
	ELU	Egyptian Leisure Airlines	EGYPTIAN LEISURE	Egypt	
9E	EDV	Endeavor Air	ENDEAVOR	United States	
	MNU	Elite Airways	MAINER	United States	
		Europe Jet	EUROPE JET	Turkey	
E1		Everbread		United Kingdom	
	EHD	E H Darby Aviation	PLATINUM AIR	United States	
1C		Electronic Data Systems		Switzerland	
1Y		Electronic Data Systems		United States	
	EXW	Executive Airlines Services	ECHOLINE	Nigeria	
	EFS	EFAOS- Agencia De Viagens e Turismo	EFAOS	Angola	
	EFD	Eisele Flugdienst	EVER FLIGHT	Germany	
	FSD	EFS-Flugservice	FLUGSERVICE	Germany	
	EIS	EIS Aircraft	COOL	Germany	
	IAG	EPAG	EPAG	France	
	ESI	ESI Eliservizi Italiani	ELISERVIZI	Italy	
	EUY	EU Airways	EUROAIRWAYS	Ireland	
VE	EUJ	EUjet	UNION JET	Ireland	defunct
	ICR	Eagle Aero	ICARUS FLIGHTS	United States	
	FEI	Eagle Air	ARCTIC EAGLE	Iceland	
		Eagle Air		Indonesia	
	EGR	Eagle Air	EAGLE SIERRA	Sierra Leone	
	EFL	Eagle Air	FLYING EAGLE	Tanzania	defunct 2002
H7	EGU	Eagle Air	AFRICAN EAGLE	Uganda	
NZ	EAG	Eagle Airways	EAGLE	New Zealand	
	EGX	Eagle Air Company	THAI EAGLE	Thailand	
	GYP	Eagle Aviation	GYPSY	United Kingdom	
	EGN	Eagle Aviation France	FRENCH EAGLE	France	
	EES	Eagle Express		Serbia	2014
9A	EZX	Eagle Express Air Charter	EAGLEXPRESS	Malaysia	
	SEG	Eagle International	SEN-EAGLE	Senegal	
	EGJ	Eagle Jet Charter	EAGLE JET	United States	
	EMD	Eaglemed (Ballard Aviation)	EAGLEMED	United States	
	ERX	Earth Airlines Services	EARTH AIR	Nigeria	
S9	HSA	East African Safari Air	DUMA	Kenya	
	EXZ	East African Safari Air Express	TWIGA	Kenya	
E3	EMU	East Asia Airlines	EAST ASIA	Macao	
	ECT	East Coast Airways	EASTWAY	South Africa	
	ECJ	East Coast Jets	EASTCOAST JET	United States	
	EHA	East Hampton Aire	AIRE HAMPTON	United States	
	EKC	East Kansas City Aviation	BLUE GOOSE	United States	
	CTK	East Midlands Helicopters	COSTOCK	United Kingdom	
	DXH	East Star Airlines	EAST STAR	China	
	EWA	East-West Airlines	EASTWEST	Australia	defunct
ZE	ESR	Eastar Jet	EASTAR	South Korea	
	EAZ	Eastern Air	EASAIR	Zambia	
	EAX	Eastern Air Executive	EASTEX	United Kingdom	
EA	EAL	Eastern Air Lines	EASTERN	United States	defunct
	EAL	Eastern Air Lines	EASTERN	United States	2015
T3	EZE	Eastern Airways	EASTFLIGHT	United Kingdom	
QF	EAQ	Eastern Australia Airlines	EASTERN	Australia	IATA dupe with parent QANTAS. Also uses 2 letter ICAO EA.
	ECI	Eastern Carolina Aviation	EASTERN CAROLINA	United States	
	GNS	Eastern Executive Air Charter	GENESIS	United Kingdom	
	LIS	Eastern Express	LARISA	Kazakhstan	
	EME	Eastern Metro Express	EMAIR	United States	
	EPB	Eastern Pacific Aviation	EAST PAC	Canada	
	ESJ	Eastern SkyJets	EASTERN SKYJETS	United Arab Emirates	
DK	ELA	Eastland Air		Australia	
W9	SGR	Eastwind Airlines	STINGER	United States	defunct
	FYE	Easy Link Aviation Services	FLYME	Nigeria	
EC	EJU	easyJet Europe	ALPINE	Austria	
DS	EZS	easyJet Switzerland	TOPSWISS	Switzerland	
U2	EZY	easyJet UK	EASY	United Kingdom	
	CMN	Eckles Aircraft	CIMMARON AIRE	United States	
	EJT	Eclipse Aviation	ECLIPSE JET	United States	
	ECQ	Eco Air	SKYBRIDGE	Nigeria	
	DEI	Ecoair		Algeria	
	NAK	École Nationale de l'Aviation Civile	ENAC SCHOOL	France	Formerly SFA prior to SEFA ATO being absorbed by the École Nationale de l'Aviation Civile.
	ECX	Ecomex Air Cargo	AIR ECOMEX	Angola	
	ECD	Ecotour	ECOTOUR	Mexico	
	XCC	Ecoturistica de Xcalak	XCALAK	Mexico	
	ECV	Ecuatoguineana De Aviación (EGA)	EQUATOGUINEA	Equatorial Guinea	
	EQC	Ecuatorial Cargo	ECUA-CARGO	Equatorial Guinea	
	ECU	Ecuavia	ECUAVIA	Ecuador	
WK	EDW	Edelweiss Air	EDELWEISS	Switzerland	
	SLO	Edgartown Air	SLOW	United States	
	EDC	Air Charter Scotland	SALTIRE	United Kingdom	Previously: Edinburgh Air Charter
	EDJ	Edwards Jet Center of Montana	EDWARDS	United States	
	EIJ	Efata Papua Airlines	EFATA	Indonesia	
	EUW	EFS European Flight Service	EUROWEST	Sweden	
MS	MSR	Egyptair	EGYPTAIR	Egypt	
	MSX	Egyptair Cargo	EGYPTAIR CARGO	Egypt	
	EGY	Egyptian Air Force		Egypt	
	EJX	Egyptian Aviation		Egypt	
	EMA	Egyptian Aviation Company		Egypt	
	EIX	Ei Air Exports	AIR EXPORTS	Ireland	
	EIR	Eirjet	EIRJET	Ireland	
LY	ELY	El Al Israel Airlines	ELAL	Israel	
	CMX	El Caminante Taxi Aéreo	EL CAMINANTE	Mexico	
	GLQ	El Quilada International Aviation	QUILADA	Sudan	
	ELS	El Sal Air	EL SAL	El Salvador	
	ESC	El Sol De América	SOLAMERICA	Venezuela	
UZ	BRQ	El-Buraq Air Transport	BURAQAIR	Libya	
	ELX	Elan Express	ELAN	United States	
	LBR	Elbe Air Transport	MOTION	Germany	
	NLK	Elbrus-Avia Air Enterprise	ELAVIA	Russia	
	DND	Eldinder Aviation	DINDER	Sudan	
	PDV	Elicar	ELICAR	Italy	
	EDO	Elidolomiti	ELIDOLOMITI	Italy	
	ELB	Elieuro	ELILOBARDIA	Italy	No longer used
	EFG	Elifriulia	ELIFRIULIA	Italy	
	ELH	Elilario Italia	LARIO	Italy	
	EOA	Elilombarda	LOMBARDA	Italy	
	MEE	Elimediterranea	ELIMEDITERRANEA	Italy	
	VUL	Elios	ELIOS	Italy	
	IEP	Elipiu'	ELIPIU	Italy	
	RSA	Elisra Airlines	ESRA	Sudan	
	EAI	Elite Air	ELAIR	Togo	
	EJD	Elite Jets	ELITE DUBAI	United Arab Emirates	
	FGS	Elitellina	ELITELLINA	Italy	
	ELT	Elliott Aviation	ELLIOT	United States	
	MGG	Elmagal Aviation Services	ELMAGAL	Sudan	
	ELR	Elrom Aviation and Investments		Israel	
	EAM	Embassy Airlines	EMBASSY AIR	Nigeria	
	EFT	Embassy Freight Company	EMBASSY FREIGHT	United States	
	EMB	Empresa Brasileira De Aeronáutica	EMBRAER	Brazil	
	XSL	Embry-Riddle Aeronautical University	SATSLAB	United States	Sesatlab Proof-of-Concept Flight
	ERU	Embry-Riddle Aeronautical University	RIDDLE	United States	
EA	EAI	Emerald Airlines	GEMSTONE	Ireland	
	JEM	Emerald Airways	GEMSTONE	United Kingdom	
	EWW	Emery Worldwide Airlines	EMERY	United States	
	EMT	Emetebe	EMETEBE	Ecuador	
EK	UAE	Emirates	EMIRATES	United Arab Emirates	
	SBC	Emoyeni Air Charter	SABIAN AIR	South Africa	Mount Air
	EMP	Empire Air Service	EMPIRE	United States	
EM	CFS	Empire Airlines	EMPIRE AIR	United States	
	MPR	Empire Aviation Services		Nigeria	
	ETP	Empire Test Pilots' School	TESTER	United Kingdom	
	AUO	Empresa (Aero Uruguay), S.A.	UNIFORM OSCAR	Uruguay	
	PRG	Empresa Aero-Servicios Parrague	ASPAR	Chile	
	VNA	Empresa Aviación Interamericana	EBBA	Uruguay	
EU	EEA	Empresa Ecuatoriana De Aviación	ECUATORIANA	Ecuador	
	CNI	Empresa Nacional De Servicios Aéreos	SERAER	Cuba	
	VNE	Empresa Venezolana	VENEZOLANA	Venezuela	
	GTV	Empresa de Aviación Aerogaviota	GAVIOTA	Cuba	
	XLT	Empressa Brasileira de Infra-Estrutura Aeroportuaria-Infraero	INFRAERO	Brazil	
	ENC	Endecots	ENDECOTS	Ecuador	
	ENI	Enimex	ENIMEX	Estonia	
G8	ENK	Enkor JSC	ENKOR	Russia	
	EGV	Enrique Gleisner Vivanco	GLEISNER	Chile	
	ESE	Ensenada Vuelos Especiales	ENSENADA ESPECIAL	Mexico	
E4	ENT	Enter Air	ENTER	Poland	
	ENS	Entergy Services	ENTERGY SHUTTLE	United States	
	EWS	Enterprise World Airways	WORLD ENTERPRISE	Democratic Republic of the Congo	
E0	ESS	Eos Airlines	NEW DAWN	United States	
	EKA	Equaflight Service	EQUAFLIGHT	Republic of the Congo	
	EQZ	Equatair Air Services (Zambia)	ZAMBIA CARGO	Zambia	
	EQT	Equatorial Airlines		Equatorial Guinea	
EJ	EQR	Equatorial Congo Airlines	ECAIR	Republic of the Congo	2024
	ERH	Era Helicopters	ERAH	United States	
	IRY	Eram Air	ERAM AIR	Iran	
	ERF	Erfoto	ERFOTO	Portugal	
	ERE	Erie Airways	AIR ERIE	United States	
B8	ERT	Eritrean Airlines	ERITREAN	Eritrea	
	EAD	Escola De Aviacao Aerocondor	AERO-ESCOLA	Portugal	
	CTV	Escuela De Pilotos Are Aviación	ARE AVIACION	Spain	
	EPC	Espace Aviation Services	ESPACE	Democratic Republic of the Congo	
	ERC	Esso Resources Canada	ESSO	Canada	
E7	ESF	Estafeta Carga Aérea		Mexico	
	EEF	Estonian Air Force	ESTONIAN AIR FORCE	Estonia	
OV	ELL	Estonian Air	ESTONIAN	Estonia	
	ETA	Estrellas Del Aire	ESTRELLAS	Mexico	
ET	ETH	Ethiopian Airlines	ETHIOPIAN	Ethiopia	
	MJM	Eti 2000	ELCO ETI	Italy	
EY	ETD	Etihad Airways	ETIHAD	United Arab Emirates	
	ETM	Etram Air Wing	ETRAM	Angola	
	EVN	Euraviation	EURAVIATION	Italy	
	ECN	Euro Continental AIE	EURO CONTINENTAL	Spain	
RZ		Euro Exec Express		Sweden	
	ESN	Euro Sun	EURO SUN	Turkey	
	EAK	Euro-Asia Air	EAKAZ	Kazakhstan	
	KZE	Euro-Asia Air International	KAZEUR	Kazakhstan	
MM	MMZ	EuroAtlantic Airways	EUROATLANTIC	Portugal	
M9	SEB	Euroavia Airlines	EURO AVIA	Cyprus	Founded 2024
	GOJ	EuroJet Aviation	GOJET	United Kingdom	
	EUP	Pan Europeenne Air Service	SAVOY	France	
	EUU	Euroamerican Air	EUROAMERICAN	Uruguay	
	ECY	Euroceltic Airways	ECHELON	United Kingdom	
	EUC	Eurocontrol		Belgium	
	ECF	Eurocopter	EUROCOPTER	France	
UI	ECA	Eurocypria Airlines	EUROCYPRIA	Cyprus	
GJ	EEZ	Eurofly	E-FLY	Italy	
	EEU	Eurofly Service	EUROFLY	Italy	
	EUG	Euroguineana de Aviación	EUROGUINEA	Equatorial Guinea	
	ERJ	Eurojet Italia	JET ITALIA	Italy	
	JLN	Eurojet Limited	JET LINE	Malta	
	RDP	Eurojet Romania	JET-ARROW	Romania	
	EJS	Eurojet Servis	EEJAY SERVICE	Czech Republic	
K2	ELO	Eurolot	EUROLOT	Poland	
3W	EMX	Euromanx Airways	EUROMANX	Austria	
	GED	Europe Air Lines	LANGUEDOC	France	
5O	FPO	Europe Airpost	FRENCH POST	France	
	EUT	European 2000 Airlines	FIESTA	Malta	
	EAG	European Aeronautical Group UK		United Kingdom	defunct
EA	EAL	European Air Express	STAR WING	Germany	
QY	BCS	European Air Transport	POSTMAN	Belgium	
E7	EAF	European Aviation Air Charter	EUROCHARTER	United Kingdom	
	EBJ	European Business Jets		United Kingdom	
	ECB	European Coastal Airlines	COASTAL CLIPPER	Croatia	
	ETV	European Executive	EURO EXEC	United Kingdom	
	EXC	European Executive Express	ECHO EXPRESS	Sweden	
	EBG	Eurosense	EUROSENSE	Bulgaria	
	ESX	Euroskylink	CATFISH	United Kingdom	
EW	EWG	Eurowings	EUROWINGS	Germany	
E6	EWL	Eurowings Europe	Black Pearl	Malta	
BR	EVA	EVA Air	EVA	Taiwan	
	EVE	Evelop Airlines	EVELOP	Spain	
	EVK	Everett Aviation	EVERETT	Kenya	
	EVT	Everett Limited		Tanzania	
EZ	EIA	Evergreen International Airlines	EVERGREEN	United States	
	VTS	Everts Air Alaska/Everts Air Cargo	EVERTS	United States	
	EVL	Evolem Aviation	EVOLEM	France	
ZD	EWR	Ewa Air	MAYOTTE AIR	France	
	EMN	Examiner Training Agency	AGENCY	United Kingdom	
JN	XLA	Excel Airways	EXPO	United Kingdom	
	XEL	Excel Charter	HELI EXCEL	United Kingdom	
	GZA	Excellent Air	EXCELLENT AIR	Germany	
MB	EXA	Execair Aviation	CANADIAN EXECAIRE	Canada	
	VCN	Execujet Charter	AVCON	Switzerland	
	EJO	Execujet Middle East	MIDJET	United Arab Emirates	
	VMP	Execujet Scandinavia	VAMPIRE	Denmark	
	LFL	Executive Air	LIFE FLIGHT	Zimbabwe	
	EAC	Executive Air Charter	EXECAIR	United States	
	XAF	Executive Air Fleet		United States	
	ECS	Executive Aircraft Charter and Charter Services	ECHO	Ireland	
	XAH	Executive Aircraft Services		United Kingdom	
OW	EXK	Executive Airlines	EXECUTIVE EAGLE	United States	American Eagle
	EXU	Executive Airlines	SACAIR	Spain	
	JTR	Executive Aviation Services	JESTER	United Kingdom	
	EXE	Executive Flight	EXEC	United States	
	TRI	Executive Flight Operations Ontario Government	TRILLIUM	Canada	
	EXJ	Executive Jet Charter		United Kingdom	
	EJM	Executive Jet Management	JET SPEED	United States	
	TEA	Executive Turbine Aviation	TRAVELMAX	South Africa	
	EXF	Eximflight	EXIMFLIGHT	Mexico	
	EXN	Exin	EXIN	Poland	
	EXR	Expertos En Carga	EXPERTOS ENCARGA	Mexico	
	FXA	Express Air	EFFEX	United States	
	EIC	Express International Cargo	EXCARGO	São Tomé and Príncipe	
	XPL	Express Line Aircompany	EXPRESSLINE	United States	
	XNA	Express Net Airlines	EXPRESSNET	United States	
EO	LHN	Express One International	LONGHORN	United States	defunct
	XTO	Express Tours	EXPRESS TOURS	Canada	
EV	ASQ	ExpressJet	ACEY	United States	
	XSL	Excel-Aire Service	EXCELAIRE	United States	
	LTD	Executive Express Aviation/JA Air Charter	LIGHT SPEED	United States	
	XSR	Executive Flight Services	AIRSHARE	United States	
	EPR	Express Airways	EMPEROR	Slovenia	
	XRO	ExxAero	CRAMER	Netherlands	
	JTM	Exxavia Limited	SKYMAN	Ireland	
	EZJ	Ezjet GT	GUYANA JET	Guyana	
8K	EVS	Exploits Valley Air Services	EVAS	Canada	

== IATA Traffic Conference Areas ==
The International Air Transport Association (IATA) divides the world into three areas called the Traffic Conference Areas (TCAs) for air travel purposes. These areas are used to define geographical boundaries for fare construction and other industry-related practices:

- Traffic Conference Area 1 (TC1) – this area includes the Americas, encompassing North America (the Caribbean, Central America, and Northern America) and South America.
- Traffic Conference Area 2 (TC2) – this area includes the EMEA region, encompassing Europe, the Middle East, and Africa (North Africa and Sub-Saharan Africa).
- Traffic Conference Area 3 (TC3) – this area includes the Asia–Pacific region, encompassing the rest of Asia (Central Asia, East Asia, North Asia, South Asia, and Southeast Asia) and Oceania.

Essentially, TC1 covers the "New World", while TC2 and TC3 together cover the "Old World" (Africa-Eurasia) and the "Land Down Under".

== See also ==
- IATA airport code
- ICAO airport code
