= List of defunct airlines of Nigeria =

This is a list of defunct airlines of Nigeria.

| Airline | Image | IATA | ICAO | Callsign | Commenced operations | Ceased operations | Notes |
|---|---|---|---|---|---|---|---|
| ADC Airlines | | Z7 | ADK | ADCO | 1984 | 2006 | |
| Aero Contractors of Nigeria | | NG | NIG | | 1960 | 2002 | Renamed to Aero Contractors |
| African Chartered Services | | | AFY | AFRICA CHARTERED | 2005 | 2005 | |
| African International Airway | | | | | 1971 | 1972 | Operated Bristol Britannia |
| African Trans Air | | | FTS | | 1992 | 1995 | Operated Boeing 727 |
| Afrijet Airlines | | 6F | FRJ | AFRIJET | 1998 | 2009 | |
| Afrimex | | | | | 1994 | 2003 | Operated Dornier 328 |
| Air Atlantic Cargo | | | ANI | NIGALANTIC | 1994 | 2000 | Operated Boeing 707-320C |
| Air Midwest | | | VTY | VICTORY | 2002 | 2010 | Operated Boeing 737-500 |
| Air Nigeria | | VK | ANP | NICON FLIERS | 2010 | 2012 | |
| Air Vanni | | | | | 1978 | 1978 | |
| Airstream Aviation | | | | | 2013 | 2017 | Operated Boeing 737-400 |
| Al-Dawood Air | | | LIE | AL-DAWOOD AIR | 2001 | 2005 | |
| Albarka Air | | F4 | NBK | AL-AIR | 1999 | 2005 | |
| Alheri Airlines | | | | | 1987 | 1987 | |
| Amako Air | | | OBK | AMAKO AIR | 2002 | 2004 | Operated Boeing 707 |
| Amed Air | | | OBI | AMEDAIR | 1994 | 1996 | Operated Boeing 707 |
| Arab Wings Nigeria | | | | | 1981 | 1981 | |
| Arax Airlines | | QY | RXA | | 1977 | 1988 | Operated Beech C-45 Expeditor, Douglas C-47, Douglas DC-4, Douglas DC-8, Grumman Widgeon, Tupolev Tu-154 |
| Associated Aviation | | SCD | | ASSOCIATED | 1996 | 2019 | |
| Axiom Air | | | EAN | | 2009 | 2011 | |
| Azman Air | | ZU | AZM | AZMAN | 2010 | 2024 | |
| Bako Air | | | OGJ | | 2004 | 2006 | |
| Bakoji Airlines Services | | | OGJ | BAKO AIR | 1999 | 2000 | Operated Tupolev Tu-134 |
| Barnax Air | | | BAL | | 1991 | 1992 | Operated Boeing 737, possibly up to 1998 |
| Bellview Airlines | | B3 | BLV | BELLVIEW AIRLINES | 1992 | 2010 | |
| Capital Airlines | | | NCP | CAPITAL SHUTTLE | 2003 | 2010 | |
| Central Airlines | | | | | 1980 | 1982 | |
| Chanchangi Airlines | | 5B | NCH | CHANGCHANGI | 1994 | 2012 | |
| Chrome Air Service | | | CHO | CHROME AIR | 1999 | 2006 | |
| City Link Airlines | | | CRG | COURAGE | 1993 | 1996 | |
| Concord Airlines | | | CND | AIR CONCORD | 1986 | 1990s | Operated BAe 125, Fairchild F-27, FH-227 |
| Dala Air Services | | | DLR | DALA AIR | 2000 | 2001 | |
| Dana Air | | 9J | DAN | DANACO | 2008 | 2024 | |
| Das Air | | | | | 2004 | 2006 | |
| Dasab Airlines | | | DSQ | Dasab Air | 2001 | 2006 | |
| Delta Air Charter | | | | | 1969 | 1977 | Operated Cessna 180, Cessna 180, Douglas DC-3, Piper PA-23, Piper PA-21, Piaggio P.166 |
| Discovery Air | | DO | DCV | DISCOVERYJET | 2014 | 2015 | Operated Boeing 737-300 |
| Dominion Air | | | DAC | DOMINION AIR | 2013 | 2013 | |
| Earth Airlines | | | ERX | EART AIR | 2002 | 2007 | |
| EAS Airlines | | OW | EXW | ECHOLINE | 1993 | 2006 | Rebranded as Nicon Airways |
| EAS Cargo Airlines | | HW | ESY | | 1987 | 1992 | Renamed to EAS Airlines |
| EAS Executive Aviation Services | | | | | 2007 | 2009 | |
| Easy Link Aviation | | | FYE | FLY ME | 2001 | 2007 | |
| Eco Air | | | ECQ | SKYBRIDGE | 2004 | 2004 | |
| Elders Colonial Airways | | | | | 1935 | 1940 | Operated Short Scion Senior |
| Embassy Airlines | | | EAM | EMBASSY AIR | ? | ? | |
| Emma-Nik Aviation Service | | | EMM | EMMANIKAIR | 1999 | 2000 | Revoked AOC |
| Executive Airlines Services | | | | | 1993 | 2004 | Revoked AOC |
| Executive Jet Services | | | | | 2005 | 2020 | |
| Express Airways Nigeria | | | | | 1985 | 2007 | Assets taken over by Sky Power Express. Operated Embraer Bandeirante |
| Falcon Airline | | | FAU | FALCON AIRLINE | ? | ? | |
| Fassey Aviation | | | FSY | | 1994 | 1998 | Operated BAC 1-11 |
| Fayban Air Services | | | FAY | FAYBAN AIR | 1990s | 1990s | Operated Boeing 727 |
| Fezel Air | | | | | 1993 | 1995 | |
| First Nation Airways | | | FRN | FIRST NATION | 2010 | 2018 | |
| Flash Airlines | | | FSH | | 1985 | 1996 | Cargo carrier. Operated Douglas DC-8-50F |
| Fleet Air Nigeria | | | | | 2005 | 2006 | Merged with EAS Airlines to form Nicon Airways |
| Fly For Value Aviation | | | FVJ | VALUJET | ? | ? | |
| Foremost Aviation | | | FMA | FOREMOST | 1992 | 1994 | |
| Freedom Air Services | | | FFF | INTER FREEDOM | 1998 | 2005 | |
| Fresh Air | | | FRR | FRESH AIR | 1999 | 2006 | |
| Galaxy Airways | | | GXY | GAZELLE | 1988 | 1988 | |
| GAS Air Nigeria | | GR | NGS | | 1973 | 2000 | Operated BAC 1-11, Boeing 707-320C |
| GAS Air Cargo | | GR | NGS | | 1973 | 2000 | Operated BAC 1-11, Boeing 707, Piper Navajo |
| Hak Air | | | | | 1990 | 2013 | failed launch |
| Hamsal Air | | 2H | MHL | HAMSAL | 2008 | 2009 | |
| Hamzair | | | HMZ | | 1983 | 1983 | Operated Douglas DC-8 |
| Harka Air Services | | | HAK | | 1994 | 2001 | Established as Harco Air Services. Operated Tupolev Tu-134 |
| Harco Air Services | | | HCO | | 1992 | 1994 | Rebranded Harca Air Services |
| Havilah Air Services | | | HAV | HAVILAH | 1990s | 1999 | AOC revoked |
| Hold-Trade Air | | | | | 1991 | 2000 | Operated BAC 1-11 |
| IAT Cargo | | | | | 1985 | 1987 | |
| IAT Cargo | | | VGO | VIRGO | 1994 | 1999 | Operated BAC 1-11, Boeing 707, Douglas DC-8 |
| Intercontinental Airlines | | VS | VVV | VICTOR SIERRA | 1978 | 1990 | Operated Sud Aviation Caravelle, Boeing 707, Douglas DC-8 |
| Interstate Airlines | | | IAE | INTERSTATE | 1990s | 1990s | Operated Douglas DC-9 |
| IRS Airlines | | IS | LVB | SILVERBIRD | 2002 | 2013 | |
| Jambo Airlines | | | | | 1986 | 1987 | Operated HS 748 |
| Kabo Air | | N9 | QNK | KABO | 1981 | 2016 | |
| Kabu Air Cargo | | | | | 1992 | 1992 | Operated Boeing 707 |
| Kati Air | | | KTI | | 1983 | 1997 | Operated Boeing 707 |
| Kenuz Airlines | | | KNS | KENUZ | 1990s | 1990s | |
| Knights Airlines | | | KGT | KNIGHT-LINER | 2005 | 2007 | Operated Boeing 747, Boeing 757, Douglas DC-10, Lockheed Tristar |
| Koda Air | | | OYE | KODA AIR | 2001 | 2005 | Operated Boeing 707 |
| Kolkol Airlines | | | KKL | | 1994 | 2000 | Operated Antonov An-24, Tupolev Tu-134, Yak-40 |
| Maina Air | | | MNI | MAINA AIR | 1994 | 1999 | |
| Mangal Airlines | | | NGL | | 2006 | 2008 | Rebranded Max Air |
| Med-View Airline | | VL | MEV | MED-VIEW | 2007 | 2019 | |
| Merchant Express Aviation | | | MXX | MERCHANT | | Prior to 2000 | |
| Meridian Airlines | | HL | MHL | HASSIMAIR | 2004 | 2014 | |
| Millennium Air | | | MLK | NIGERJET | 2003 | 2006 | Renamed to Emirate Touch Aviation. Operated Let Turbolet |
| Nexus Aviation | | | NXS | NEXUS AVIATION | 2003 | 2003 | AOC suspended |
| Nicon Airways | | | NCN | NICON AIRWAYS | 2006 | 2007 | |
| Nigeria Air Services | | | | | 1946 | 1947 | |
| Nigeria Airways | | WT | NGA | NIGERIA | 1958 | 2003 | |
| Nigeria One | | | | | 2013 | 2013 | Rebranded as Nigerian Eagle |
| Nigerian Eagle Airlines | | VK | VGN | | 2009 | 2010 | Rebranded as Air Nigeria |
| Nigerian Global Aviation | | | NGI | | 2003 | 2003 | |
| Nigerian Trade Wings | | | | | 1978 | 1979 | Operated Douglas C-47, Douglas C-54, Douglas C-118 |
| North-East Airlines | | | NEN | NORTHEAST SWAN | 1994 | 1998 | Operated Boeing 727 |
| Okada Air | | 9H | OKJ | OKADA AIR | 1982 | 2002 | |
| Onedot Aviation | | | | | 2003 | 2008 | |
| Oriental Airlines | | | OAC | ORIENTAL AIR | 1990 | 2003 | Operated BAC 1-11, Let Turbolet |
| Overnight Cargo Nigeria | | | OCL | | 1992 | 1994 | Operated Boeing 707, Douglas DC-8-50 |
| Pan Nnannah Airways | | | | | 2000 | 2000 | Nigerian Civil Aviation Authourity (NCAA) Withdrew Their Air Transport License in 2000 |
| Pan African Airlines | | PF | | | 1961 | 2000 | |
| PMAS Regional Airlines | | | | | 1987 | 1995 | Renamed to DANA Dornier Aviation Nigeria. Operated Dornier Do 28, Dornier 228, Dornier 328 |
| Premium Air Shuttle | | | EMI | BLUE SHUTTLE | 1995 | 2006 | Operated Boeing 737, Yak-40 |
| Prime Air Services | | | PML | PRIME NIGERIA | 2000 | 2016 | |
| RN Cargo | | | | | 1980s | 1983 | Operated Boeing 707 |
| Routair Aviation | | | RUT | ROUTAIR | 1994 | 1999 | Operated Boeing 707 |
| Savanah Airlines | | | SNI | SAVANHLINE | 2001 | 2003 | Operated Antonov An-12, BAC 1-11, Boeing 727 |
| Sky Air Cargo | | | | | 1985 | 1990 | |
| Sky Executive Airlines | | | SXC | SKY EXEC | 2001 | 2003 | Operated Let Turbolet |
| Skyline | | | SMT | SKYLIMIT | 2001 | 2003 | Operated DHC-7 |
| Skypower Express Airways | | NB | EAN | NIGERIA EXPRESS | 1985 | 2007 | |
| Slok Air International | | SO | OKS | SLOK GAMBIA | 1996 | 2004 | Reformed as Slok Air Gambia Limited |
| SMA Airlines | | | SMA | SESAME | 1999 | 2000 | Operated Boeing 727 |
| Sosoliso Airlines | | SO | OSL | SOSOLISO | 1994 | 2006 | |
| Space World International Airlines | | | SPF | SPACE WORLD | 2002 | 2007 | Operated Boeing 737 |
| Thames Air Services & Charter | | | TMQ | THAMES AIR | 1993 | 1994 | Operated Boeing 707 |
| TAT Nigeria | | | | | 2008 | 2009 | |
| Trans Sahara Air | | | SBJ | | 2001 | 2004 | Operated Boeing 727, Douglas DC-10 |
| Trans-Air Services | | | TSN | | 1992 | 1997 | Operated Boeing 707-321C, Boeing 747-100, Boeing 747-200 |
| Triax Airlines | | | TIX | TRIAX | 1992 | 2000 | Operated Boeing 727 |
| United Air Express | | | AEU | UNITED EXPRESS | 1994 | 1990s | Operated Fairchild F-27 |
| United Air Service | | SY | UHP | SIERRA YANKEE | 1983 | 1987 | Rebranded as EAS Cargo Airlines. Operated Boeing 707 |
| Virgin Nigeria | | VK | VGN | VIRGIN NIGERIA | 2004 | 2009 | Rebranded as Nigerian Eagle Airlines |
| West African Airways Corporation | | WT | | | 1947 | 1952 | Operated Boeing Stratocruiser |
| West African Airways Corporation Nigeria | | | NGA | NIGERIA | 1958 | 1961 | Renamed to Nigeria Airways |
| Wings Aviation | | | TWD | TRADEWINGS | 2001 | 2012 | Merged into JedAir |
| Yvic Air | | | VYC | | 1992 | 1997 | |
| Zenith Air | | | NZE | ZENITH AIR | 1992 | 1993 | Operated Antonov An-12, Douglas DC-9 |

== See also ==
- List of airlines of Nigeria
- List of airports in Nigeria
