= EGX =

EGX may refer to:

- Egegik Airport, which has IATA airport code EGX
- Eagle Air Company, which has ICAO airline designator EGX
- Egyptian Exchange, Egypt's stock exchange
- EGX (expo), an annual video game convention
