= EJX =

EJX may refer to:

- EJX, a modification of the AFLX Australian Rules Football ruleset named after E. J. Whitten
- ICAO code for Egyptian Aviation
- DPharp EJX, a product of Yokogawa Electric
