= VTY =

VTY may refer to:

- Joint Organisation of State Employees (Valtion yhteisjärjestö, VTY), a Finnish trade union federation
- Air Midwest (Nigeria) (ICAO: VTY), a defunct airline
- ViTALiTY (also known as VTY), a warez group
- WVTY (also known as "92-1 VTY Country"), an American radio station
- Vistry Group (LSE: VTY), a British housebuilding company
- Virtual teletype (VTY), a command line interface, see Telnet
