= Flight 75 =

Flight 75 may refer to:

- Capital Airlines Flight 75, crashed on May 12, 1959
- Aerolift Philippines Flight 075, crashed on 18 May 1990
