= Aerolift Philippines =

Philippine airline

IATA	ICAO	Call sign
N/A	LFT	Aerolifter
- Founded: 1982
- Ceased operations: 1996
- Hubs: Ninoy Aquino International Airport; Mactan Cebu International Airport
- Fleet size: 3
- Destinations: 14
- Parent company: Aerolift Philippines Corporation
- Headquarters: Makati, Philippines
- Key people: Capt. Tomas V. Yañez (President and CEO)

Aerolift or Aerolift Philippines Corporation was an inter-island airline based in the Philippines. It was established in 1982 and was chosen by the government in 1989 as the second flag carrier of the Philippines next to Philippine Airlines. Its aircraft accident caused it to cease operation in 1996.

It pioneered the feeder airport operations in the country direct from Manila. It also was the first airline to fly to Caticlan and Busuanga airports. It was the first airline which promoted Boracay as a foreign tourist destination. It flew regular flights to Kalibo, Dipolog, Tagbilaran, San Jose, Ormoc and Surigao. It also flew to Bagabag, Catarman, Basco, El Nido, and Cuyo.

The airline's mounted profitable daily feeder-airport flights and growing profitable foreign tourist destinations prompted Philippine Airlines, its biggest rival to introduced direct flights too larger airports which it operates utilizing a larger fokker-50 aircraft to the cities of Dipolog, Kalibo, and Tagbilaran in 1988.

Its corporate office was located in the ground floor of Chemphil Building, Pasay Road, Legaspi Village, Makati.

== Fleet ==
Aerolift Philippines operated the following aircraft during its existence:

Aircraft	Year retired	Number
Beechcraft 1900-C	1996	2

== Accidents ==
On May 18, 1990, one of its Beechcraft aircraft, RP-C314, Flight 075 bound for Surigao crashed on take-off killing all 21 passengers and crew on board, including 4 people on the ground.
