= Arax Airlines =

Nigerian cargo airline (1960s–1989)

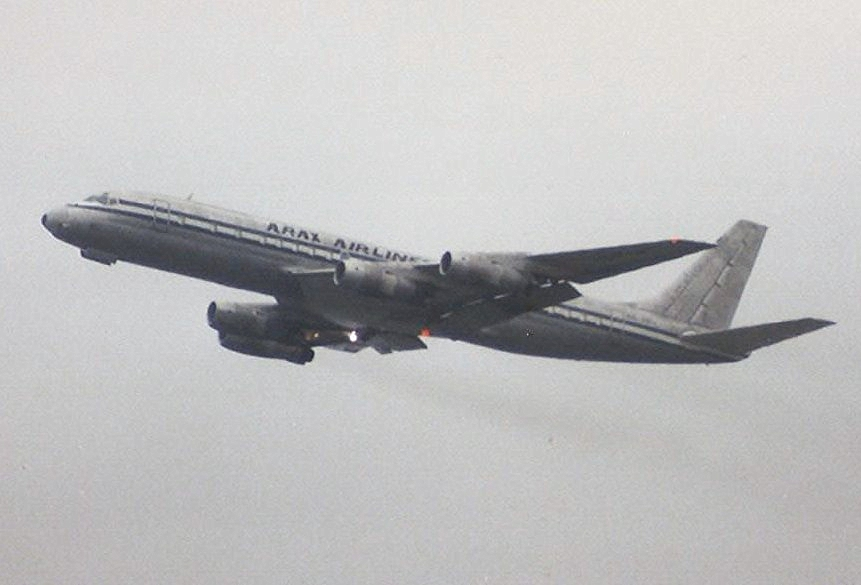
- A Douglas DC-8-55F (5N-ARH) operated by Arax Airlines, later destroyed in a 1988 crash in Cairo
| IATA | ICAO | Call sign |
|---|---|---|
| QY | RXA | — |
- Founded: c. late 1960s–1970s
- Ceased operations: 1989
- Hubs: Murtala Muhammed International Airport
- Headquarters: Lagos, Nigeria

Arax Airlines was a Nigerian cargo airline based in Lagos that operated from the late 1960s or early 1970s until 1989. The airline held licences for both cargo and passenger services and supported oil industry operations within Nigeria.

== History ==
The airline was established with support from the International Development Corporation, although sources differ on the exact founding year. By the early 1970s, Arax Airlines was operating aircraft such as the Douglas DC-3, Beech 18, and Grumman G-44 Widgeon.

In 1971, a Douglas C-47 Skytrain operated by the airline was used to deliver humanitarian aid to drought-affected areas of the Sahel.

In 1976, Arax Airlines renewed its licence to conduct cargo and passenger operations in support of oil companies operating in Nigeria. At that time, its fleet included one Douglas DC-4 and three Douglas DC-3 aircraft.

The airline ceased operations in 1989. Its activities were later succeeded by Sky Air Cargo (Liberia), which subsequently operated under different names.

== Fleet ==
Arax Airlines operated a range of piston and jet aircraft during its existence, including:

- Douglas DC-3 / Douglas C-47 Skytrain
- Douglas DC-4
- Douglas DC-8
- Grumman G-44 Widgeon
- Beechcraft C-45 Expeditor

== Accidents and incidents ==
- In January 1979, a Douglas DC-3 that had previously served with Air France (as F-BBDI), Air Madagascar (as 5R-MAU), and Air Mauritanie (as 5T-RIF) was at Southend Airport being prepared for entry into service with Arax Airlines. During a test flight the aircraft suffered an emergency and carried out a wheels-up crash landing. It was subsequently impounded and ferried to Lagos, where it was stored and later scrapped.
- In 1981 a DC 3 registered as 5N-ARA was written off at lagos in 1981 with no further details given
- On 31 March 1988, a Douglas DC-8-55F registered 5N-ARH and named Captain Ernie Trapaga crashed shortly after takeoff from Cairo International Airport, killing all four occupants. The aircraft had been operating a cargo flight from Billund, Denmark to Sharjah with an intermediate stop in Cairo, and was carrying approximately 100 Danish cows at the time. Shortly after takeoff from runway 27R, an engine failed and caught fire, leading to a loss of control. The aircraft crashed approximately 700 metres beyond the runway end and was destroyed by fire. It had accumulated 53,176 flight hours at the time of the accident. The aircraft had been delivered new to KLM in 1966 as PH-DCU, before passing to Rich International in 1981 and Trans Arabian Air Transport (as N29954) in 1983, prior to joining Arax Airlines in 1986.

== See also ==
- List of defunct airlines of Nigeria
