= Space World International Airlines =

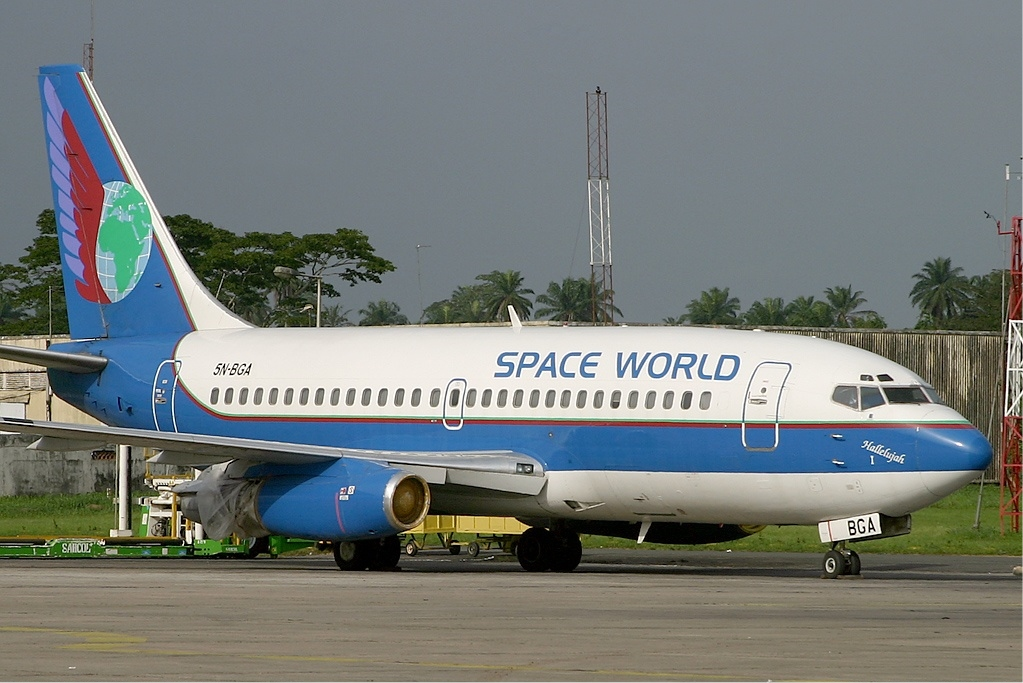
IATA	ICAO	Call sign
n/a	SPF	SPACE WORLD
- Ceased operations: April 30, 2007
- Hubs: Lagos
- Fleet size: 2
- Key people: Steven Adekunle

Space World International Airlines was a Nigerian Airline owned by Steven Adekunle it ceased operations due to the bad shape of the Nigerian aviation sector during the 2000s, and the NCAA ordering the re-capitalization of airlines of anywhere between ₦20 million to ₦500 million. The cessation date was April 30, 2007. The aircraft were in Saudi Arabia for a C Check completion before being bound to return to Nigeria. Space World was also implicated in an engine procurement scandal.

== Fleet ==
Space World International Airlines operated the following aircraft

- 2x 737-200

== See also ==
- List of defunct airlines of Nigeria
