= Capital Airlines (Nigeria) =

Nigerian charter airline

IATA	ICAO	Call sign
-	NCP	CAPITAL SHUTTLE
- Founded: 2003
- Ceased operations: 2010
- Hubs: Murtala Muhammed International Airport
- Fleet size: 5
- Destinations: 4
- Parent company: Synergy Group
- Headquarters: Lagos, Nigeria
- Website: www.capitalairnigeria.com

Capital Airlines Limited was a charter airline headquartered in Lagos, Nigeria, that operated scheduled and chartered domestic flights out of its base at Murtala Muhammed International Airport and Ilorin International Airport.

== History ==
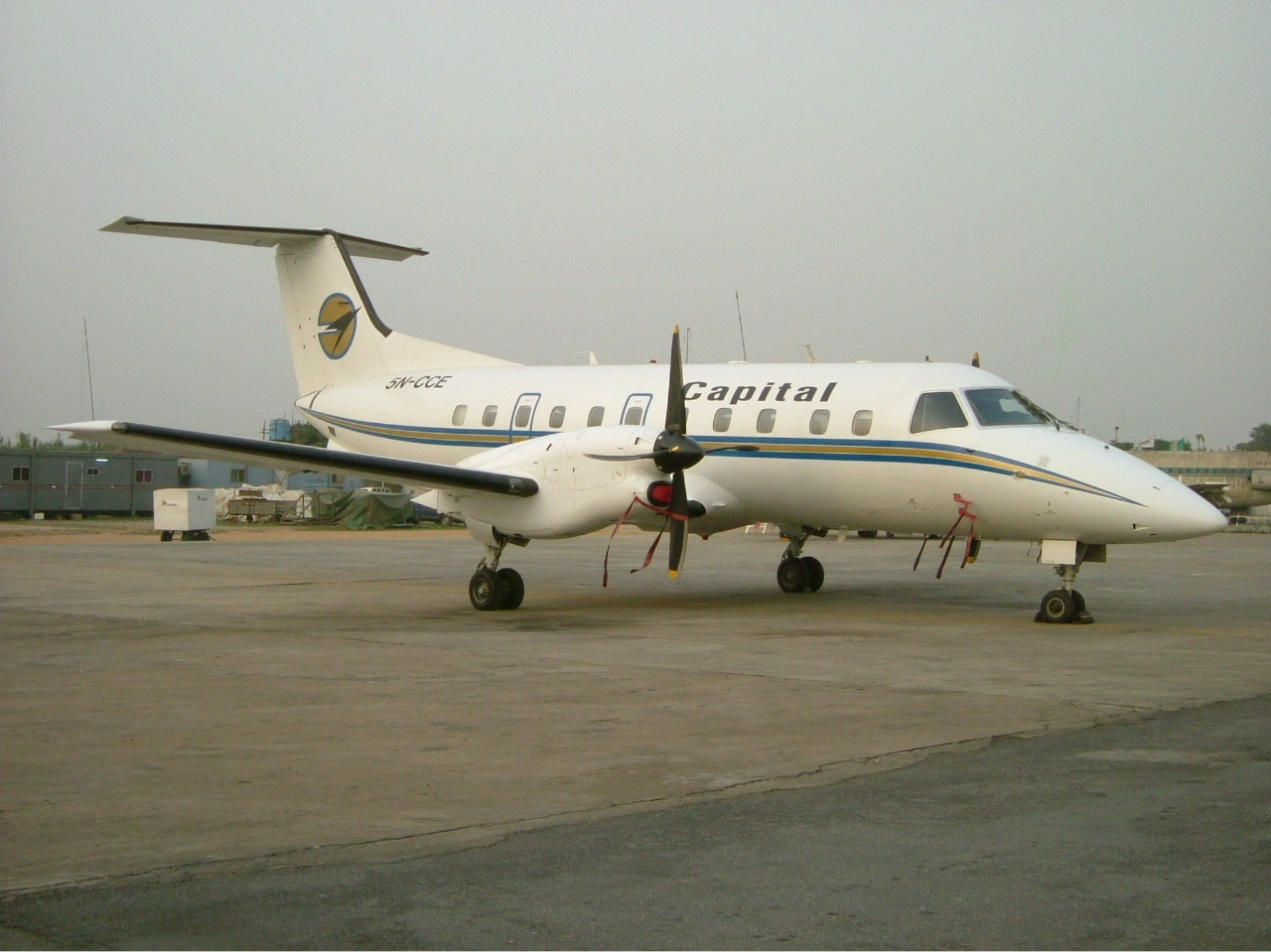
A Capital Airlines Embraer EMB 120 Brasilia at Murtala Muhammed International Airport in 2004.

Capital Airlines was founded in 2003. In mid-2005, the airline partnered with Synergy Group to operate Nigeria's viable fringe airports and to open some alternative airports, hitherto considered unviable.

The Nigerian government set a deadline of April 30, 2007 for all airlines operating in the country to re-capitalise or be grounded, in an effort to ensure better services and safety. Capital Airlines satisfied the demanded criteria in terms of re-capitalization and was re-registered for operation.

In 2009, Capital Airlines failed to meet the Nigerian Civil Aviation Authority requirement of having more than one aircraft, forcing it to suspend all flights in October 30, 2009. The company was subsequently dissolved in 2010.

== Destinations ==
In July 2007, Capital Airlines had offered scheduled flights to the following cities:

- Nigeria
  - Abuja - Nnamdi Azikiwe International Airport
  - Ilorin - Ilorin International Airport
  - Lagos - Murtala Muhammed International Airport Hub
  - Minna - Minna Airport

== Fleet ==
Capital Airlines consisted of a fleet of 5 Embraer EMB 120 Brasilia turboprops.

== Accidents and incidents ==
- On August 2, 2009, an Embraer EMB 120 Brasilia (registered 5N-BLN) suffered a fire on the right engine after the pilots started the engines. All 28 passengers and 5 crew members were uninjured.

== See also ==
- List of defunct airlines of Nigeria
