= Alaska Central Express =

Airline of the United States

IATA	ICAO	Call sign
KO	AER	ACE AIR
- Founded: 1996; 30 years ago
- AOC #: YADA179J
- Operating bases: Ted Stevens Anchorage International Airport
- Fleet size: 20
- Destinations: 35
- Headquarters: Anchorage, Alaska
- Website: www.aceaircargo.com

Old logo

Alaska Central Express is an airline based at Ted Stevens Anchorage International Airport in Anchorage, Alaska, United States. It is a cargo and small package express service.

== History ==
The airline was established as Yutana Airlines in 1987 and renamed to Alaska Central Express in 1994 when the certificate was bought from the Part 135 in Fairbanks, Alaska.

Much of the original pilots, staff, mechanics, and equipment including three Raytheon Beechcraft 1900Cs, came from MarkAir Express, a subsidiary of the bankrupt MarkAir. In 2007, with the purchase of a Beech 1900C (N115AX) combi passenger/cargo, ACE Air Cargo began charter passenger flights. Alaska Central Express, as of 2020, owns twenty airplanes with plans for future expansion.

== Destinations ==
Alaska Central Express operates freight services to the following domestic scheduled destinations (at January 2005):

- Anchorage
- Aniak
- Atmautluak
- Bethel
- Chefornak
- Chevak
- Cold Bay
- Dillingham
- Dutch Harbor
- Eek
- Hooper Bay
- Juneau
- Ketchikan
- King Salmon
- Kipnuk
- Kodiak
- Kongiganak
- Kwigillingok
- Marshall
- Newtok
- Nightmute
- Petersburg
- Port Heiden
- Quinhagak
- Sand Point
- Scammon Bay
- Sitka
- St George Island
- St Paul Island
- Togiak
- Toksook Bay
- Tuntutuliak
- Tununak
- Wrangell
- Yakutat

== Fleet ==
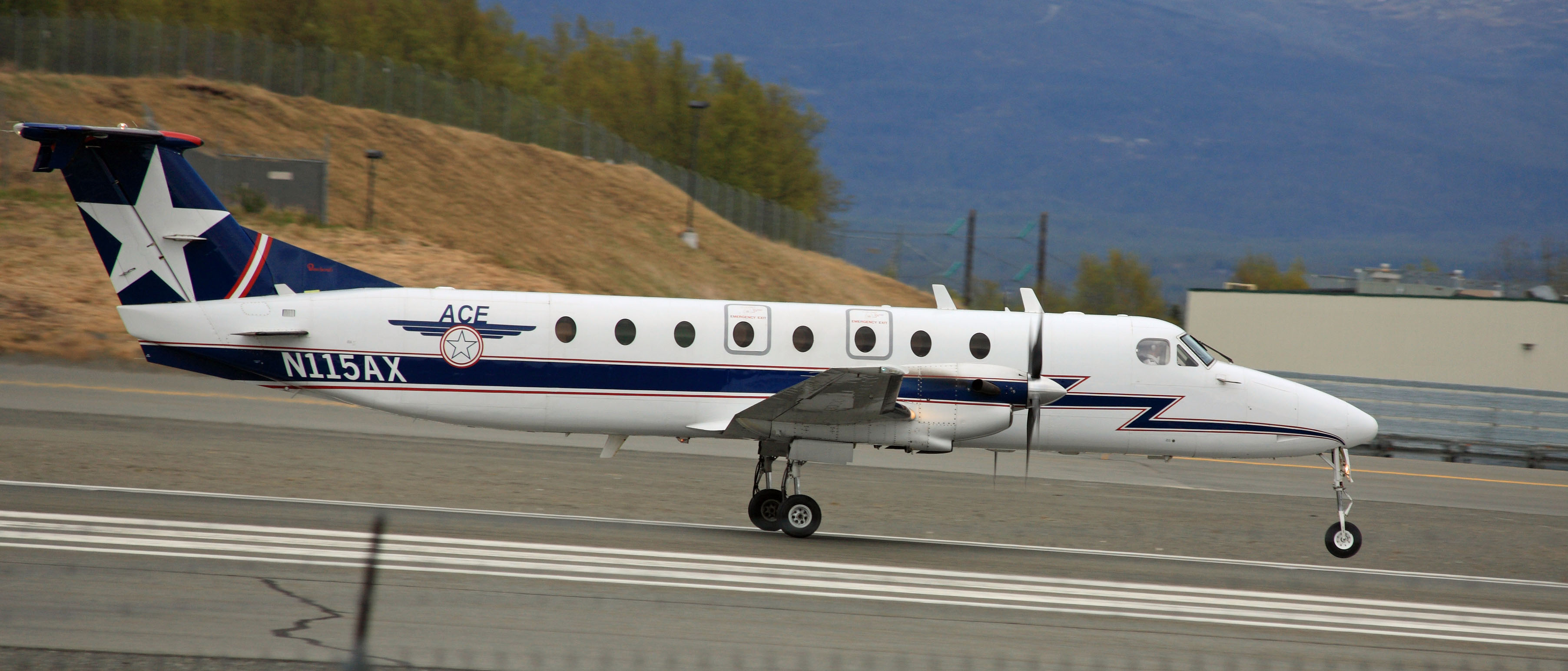
ACE turboprop landing at Anchorage

As of August 2025, Alaska Central Express operates the following aircraft:

Alaska Central Express fleet
Aircraft	In fleet	Passengers	Notes
Beechcraft 1900C-1(F)	20		
Total	20		

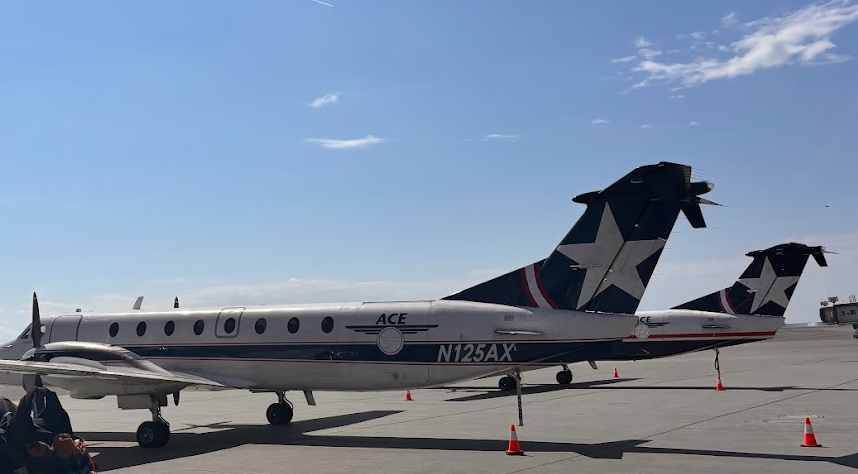
ACE turboprops parked at Anchorage

On 7 July 2020, ACE acquired eight Beechcraft planes at Ravn Alaska's bankruptcy auction.

== Accidents and incidents ==
- On 22 January 2010, Alaska Central Express Flight 22 crashed in the sea off the end of the runway seconds after taking off at Sand Point airport; both crew members died.
- On 8 March 2013, Alaska Central Express Flight 51 crashed near the Muklung Hills-Aleknagik. The only two persons on board, the captain and copilot, died.

== See also ==
- List of airlines in Alaska
