= Jerry Krause (missionary) =

American aviator and missionary

Jerry Krause is an American pilot who served for 22 years with Mission Aviation Fellowship as a missionary in Mali and the Democratic Republic of the Congo, after which he remained in Mali to work for the Sahel Aviation Service.

On April 7, 2013, Krause's plane was reported missing off the coast of West Africa, near São Tomé. His disappearance generated national press coverage, as well as a social media and Internet-based campaign to locate him.

== Life ==
Jerry Krause was born in Waseca, Minnesota, to Richard and Clarice Krause. His wife Gina was born in Wabash, Indiana; they married in 1982. In 1996, the couple moved to Mali with their three children, to serve as missionaries with the Mission Aviation Fellowship (MAF). Their children grew up in Mali, later returning to the United States for college.

After MAF pulled out of Mali in 2009, Jerry and Gina continued to live there, working for Bamako-based Sahel Aviation Service, a commercial air charter company that provides flight service throughout West Africa.

== Disappearance ==
On April 7, 2013, Krause was in Johannesburg, South Africa, where his twin-engine Beechcraft 1900C 17-passenger airplane had finished undergoing maintenance and refurbishing. On his return trip, he landed in Ondangwa, Namibia to refuel. He departed from there at 10:20 am, intending to go to São Tomé, then Accra, Ghana, and arrive back in Bamako, Mali at 8:00 pm.

Krause's last check-in with the control tower was at 4:13 pm. He may have been 20 minutes away from São Tomé International Airport when his plane disappeared. He was the only person on board.

== Investigation ==
According to the Krause family, São Tomé aviation officials did not follow proper protocol, and waited 24 hours before reporting the plane's disappearance. The family filed a missing persons report with the National Transportation Safety Board and the South African Civil Aviation Authority, after which military personnel joined the search. U.S. senators also requested assistance from the State Department and Department of Defense.

No wreckage was found, leading the family to believe that Krause was ambushed or kidnapped after being forced to land in hostile territory. They started an internet-based campaign to spread awareness of the situation and to aid in the search, and offered a $5,000 reward for information leading to Krause's discovery.

== See also ==
- List of people who disappeared mysteriously: post-1970
