= Beechcraft 1900 =

Commuter airliner and light transport aircraft

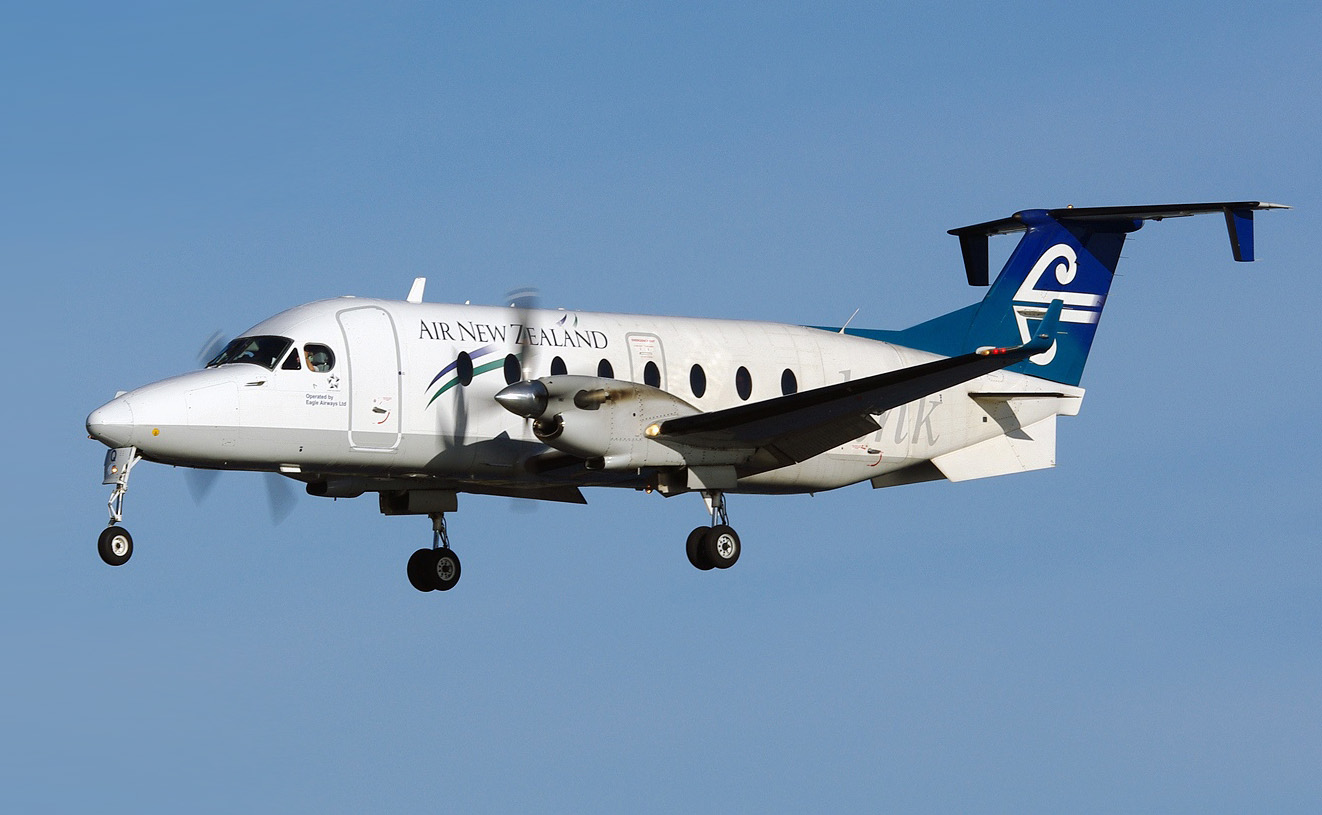
- An Air New Zealand Link 1900D

General information
- Type: Regional airliner, cargo, and corporate aircraft
- Manufacturer: Beech Aircraft Corporation; Raytheon Aircraft Company
- Status: In service
- Primary users: Ameriflight Alpine Air Express; Central Mountain Air; Propair
- Number built: 695

History
- Manufactured: 1982–2002
- Introduction date: February 1984
- First flight: September 3, 1982
- Developed from: Beechcraft Super King Air

The Beechcraft 1900 is an American twin-engine turboprop regional airliner manufactured by Beechcraft. It is also used as a freight aircraft and corporate transport, and by several governmental and military organizations. With customers favoring larger regional jets, then-owner Raytheon ended production in October 2002.

Developed from the Beechcraft Super King Air, the aircraft was designed to carry passengers in all weather conditions from airports with relatively short runways. It is capable of flying in excess of 600 miles (970 km), although few operators use its full-fuel range.

== Development ==
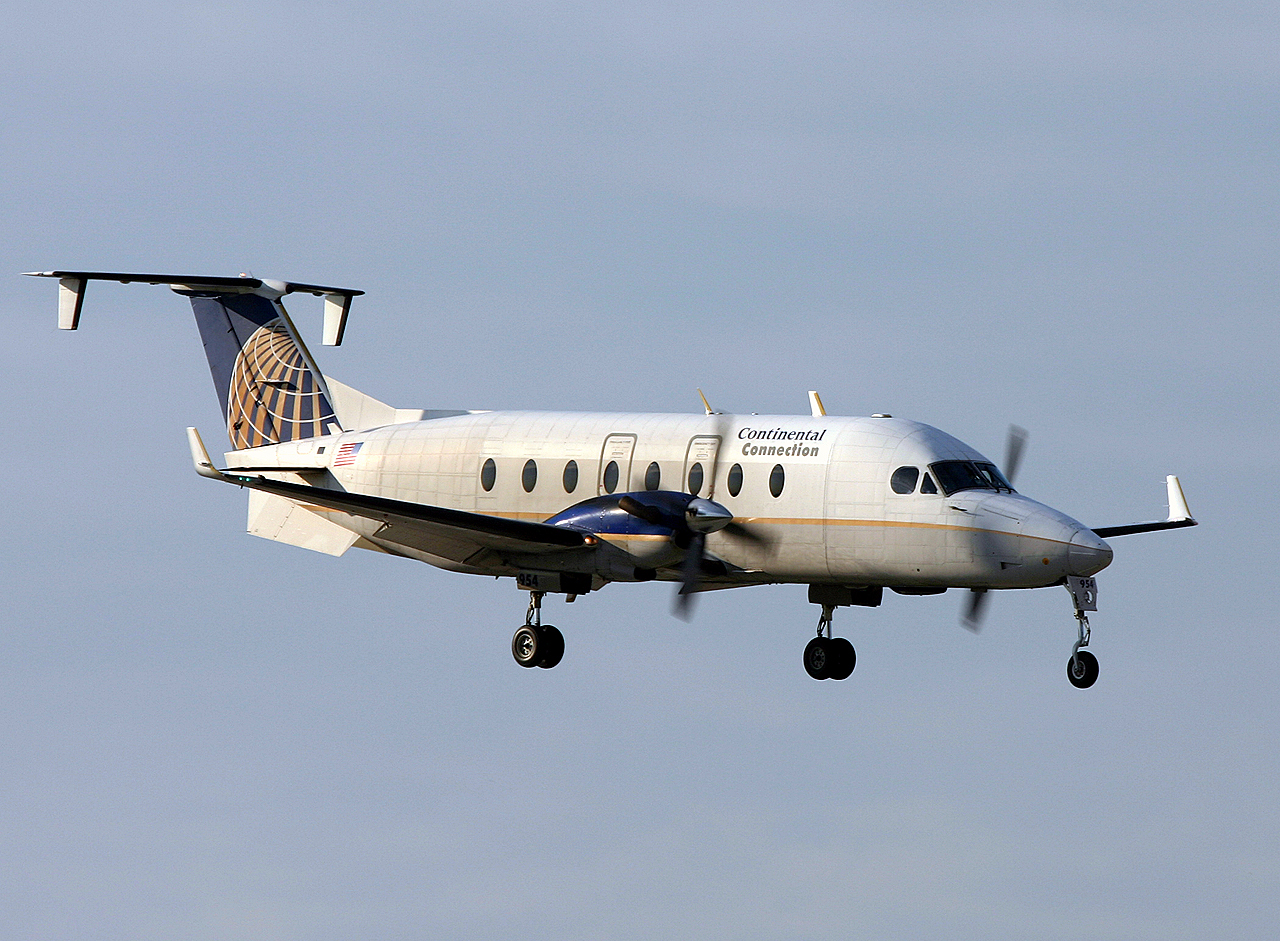
A Continental Connection 1900D

The 1900 is Beechcraft's third regional airliner after the Beechcraft Model 18 and Beechcraft Model 99 Airliner.

The Beechcraft 1900's design lineage began in 1949 with the Beechcraft Model 50 Twin Bonanza, a 5-passenger, reciprocating engine utility aircraft designed for the U.S. Army. A larger passenger cabin was added to the Twin Bonanza's airframe, and called the Model 65 Queen Air. This aircraft was, in turn, further modified by adding turboprop engines and cabin pressurization, and named the Model 90 King Air. A stretched version of the King Air was later developed and designated the Model 200 Super King Air. Beechcraft developed the 1900 directly from the Super King Air, in order to provide a pressurized commuterliner to compete with the Swearingen Metro and the British Aerospace Jetstream.

The 1900 first flew on September 3, 1982, with Federal Aviation Administration (FAA) certification awarded on November 22, 1983, under Special Federal Aviation Regulation (SFAR) 41C airworthiness standards. Like the 1900, the 1900C was certified under SFAR 41C, but the later 1900D version was certified to FAR Part 23 "Commuter Category" standards.

The 1900 entered service in February 1984, with the first ExecLiner corporate version delivered in 1985. A total of 695 Beechcraft 1900 aircraft were built. In 1991, the price of a 1900D Airliner was $3.95 million. With market trends favoring larger 50- to 90-seat regional jets, Raytheon ended production of the Beechcraft 1900 in October 2002. Many airlines continue to fly the 1900.

== Design ==
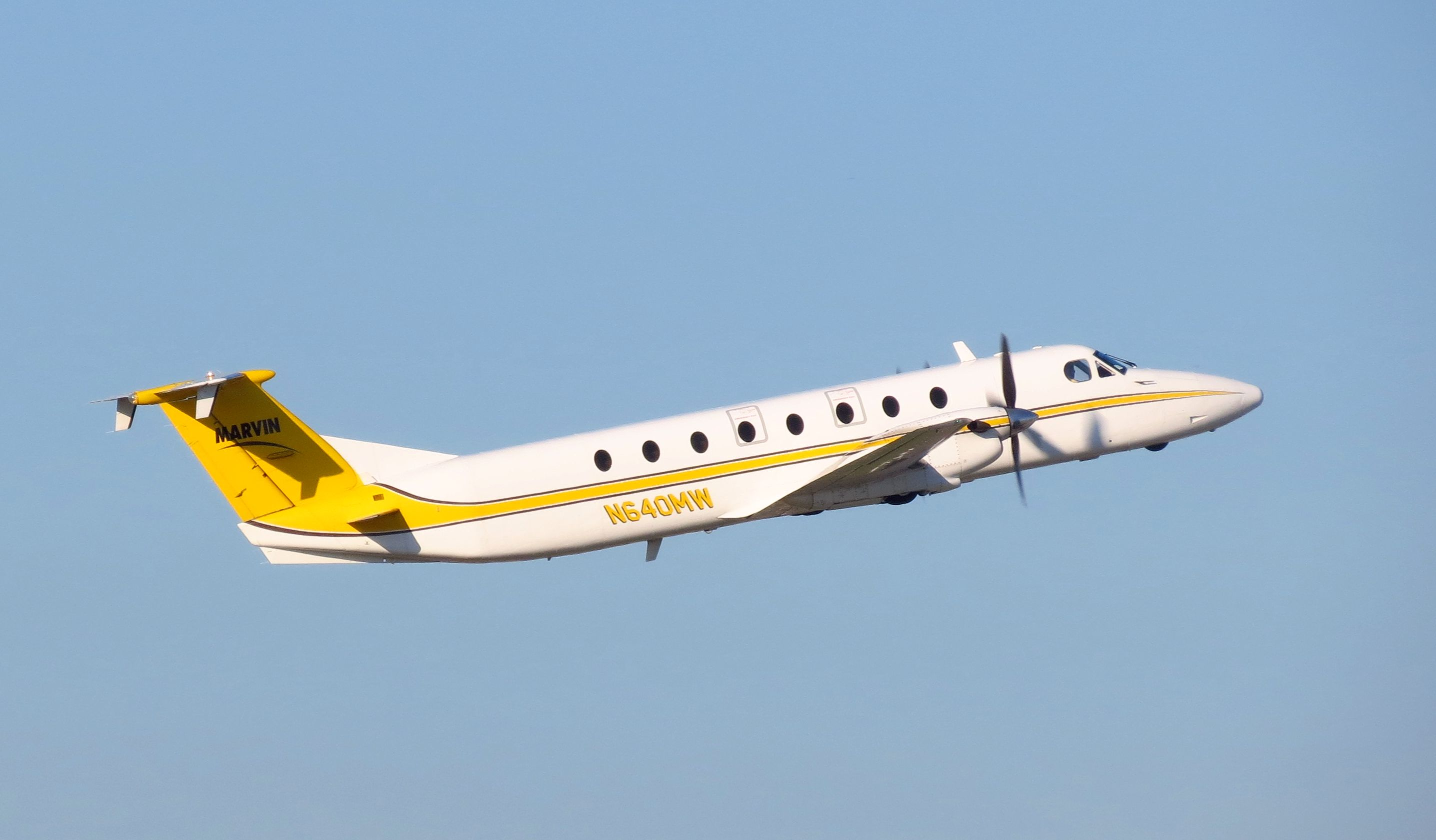
Beechcraft 1900C

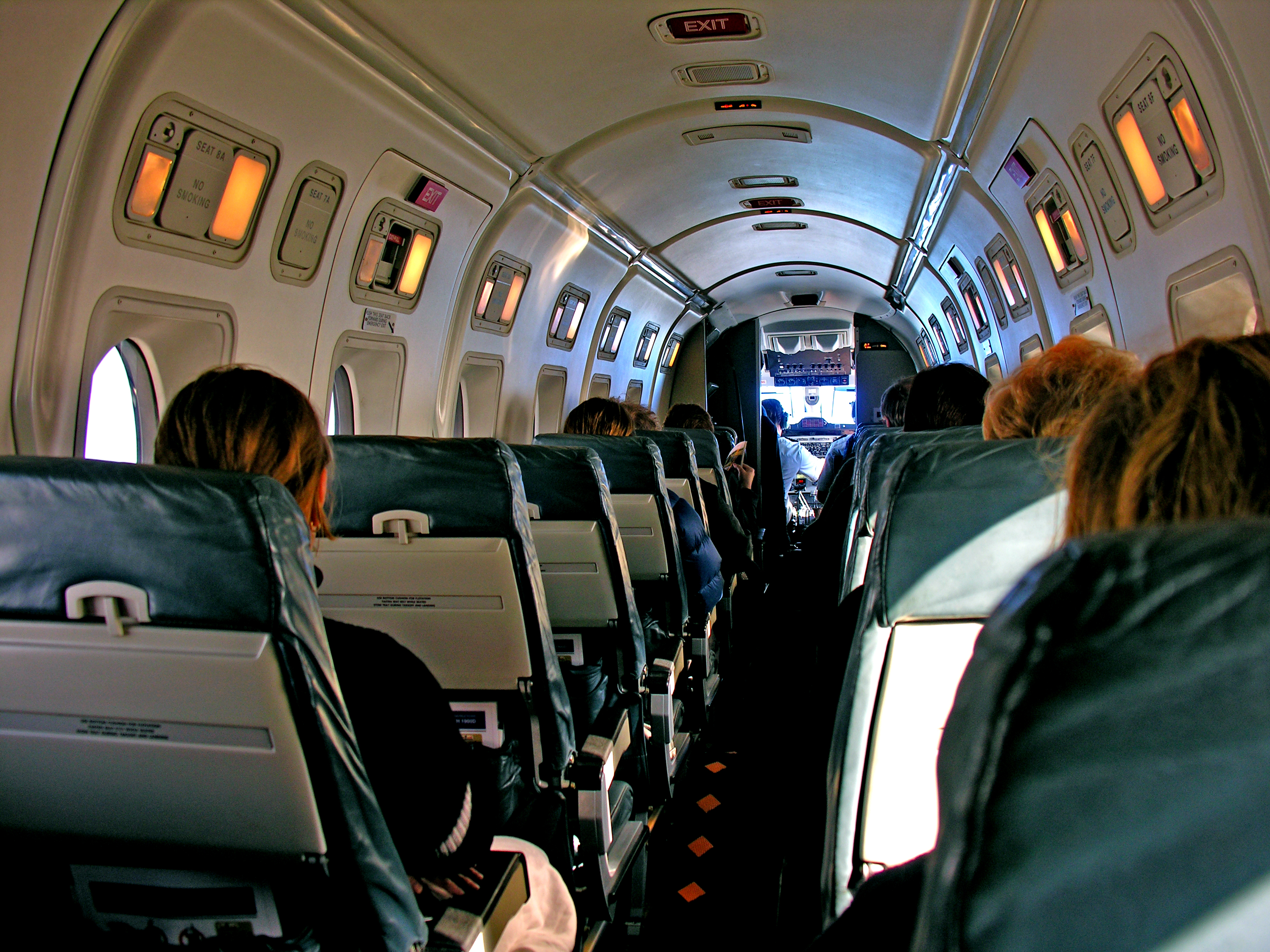
The 1900 has single passenger seats either side of an aisle

Since the 1900 is derived from the King Air, all 1900s share certain characteristics with that aircraft. Cockpit controls and operations are similar to those of the King Air. The aircraft's noticeable deviations from the King Air comes from its longer fuselage and the presence of "stabilons", which are small horizontal stabilizers at the rear of the fuselage for overcoming T-tail blanking when the aircraft is in higher angles of attack. Additional fins for yaw stability were installed on the tail for 1900Ds, which also feature a taller cabin to allow for a "stand-up cabin" with more walking headspace like conventional airliners. In the United States, the Federal Aviation Regulations require two pilots for passenger airline operations, but the 1900 is designed and certificated for single-pilot operation in corporate or cargo settings, as is the King Air.

The 1900 is powered by two Pratt & Whitney Canada PT6A turboprop engines. The 1900 and 1900C use two PT6A-65B engines, each flat rated at 1,100 shaft horsepower (820 kW). The 1900D uses two PT6A-67D engines, each rated at 1,279 shaft horsepower (954 kW). The propellers are manufactured by Hartzell, with four blades on each propeller. The blades are made from composite materials.

=== Performance ===
At FL230, the 1900D cruises at 280 kn (320 mph; 520 km/h) true airspeed while burning 772 lb (350 kg) per hour. Range with 19 passengers for a flight plan with instrument flight rules fuel reserves for a 100 nmi (115 mi; 185 km) alternate airport and 45-minute hold is 680 nmi (780 mi; 1,260 km). It can take off from 3,740 ft (1,140 m) runways at a weight of 16,950 lb (7,690 kg), at sea level and ISA conditions. It can operate on grass and rough runways.

The airplane is certified to fly up to an altitude of 25,000 feet (7,600 m) above mean sea level, with its pressurized cabin. It is designed to operate in most weather conditions, including icing conditions, and it is usually equipped with weather radar to help pilots avoid severe weather. The aircraft can be fitted with a lavatory, using space otherwise available for passenger seating and cargo storage.

== Variants ==
=== 1900 ===
The original design is known simply as the Beechcraft 1900. It features two airstair passenger boarding doors: one near the tail of the aircraft much like the smaller King Airs, and a second at the front just behind the cockpit. It has a small cargo door near the tail for access to the baggage compartment, which is behind the passenger compartment. Only three airframes were built, with "UA" serial numbers of UA-1, UA-2, and UA-3. UA-1 and UA-2 are stored at a Beechcraft facility in Wichita, Kansas. UA-3, registered FAB-043, served in Bolivia until it crashed in November 2011.

=== 1900C ===
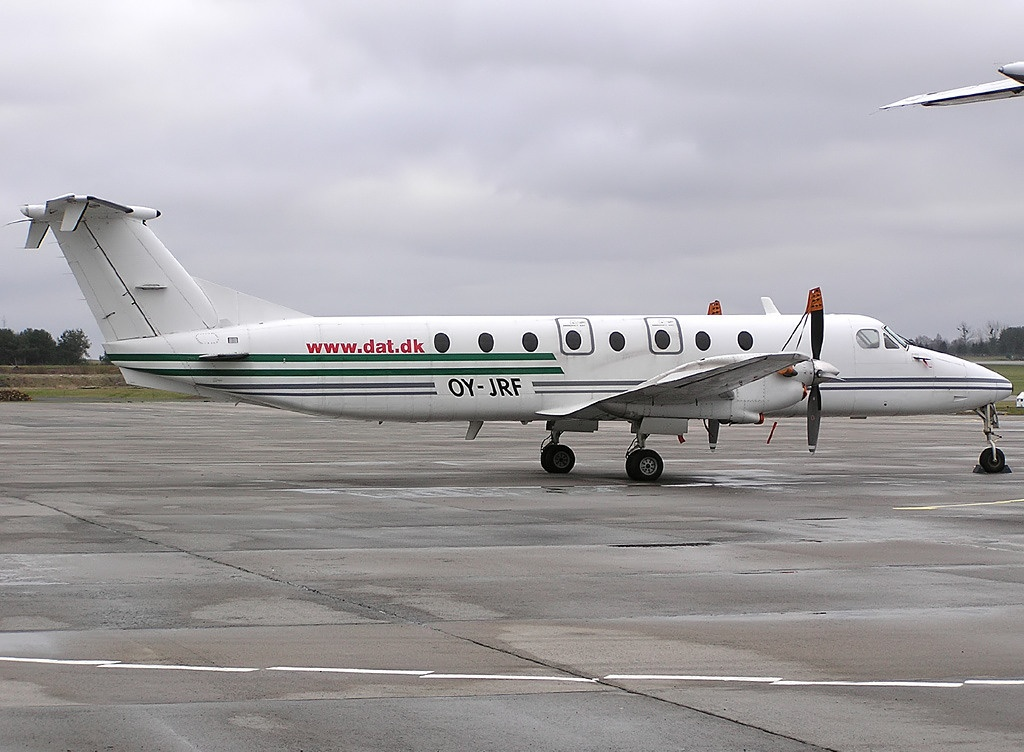
Danish Air Transport 1900C

It quickly became clear that having two airstair doors on an aircraft holding only 19 passengers was excessive. In creating the 1900C, Beechcraft kept the front airstair, but eliminated the aft airstair door, installing an enlarged cargo door in its place. Other than the redesigned door layout, the early 1900Cs were substantially similar to the original 1900s. These were assigned serial numbers starting with the letters UB. A total of 74 UB version were built, many of which remain in service. Aircraft in the UA and UB series employ a bladder-type fuel tank system in the wings. Later 1900Cs use a wet wing fuel system: entire sections of the wing are sealed off for use as fuel tanks. This design change allowed more fuel to be stored, substantially increasing the 1900C's range. The wet wing 1900Cs were assigned serial numbers beginning with "UC." These aircraft are also referred to as 1900C-1s. The wet wings proved popular, and the UC is the most common version of the low-ceiling 1900, with 174 UC airframes built.

Raytheon manufactured six 1900C aircraft for use by the U.S. military. These were assigned "UD" serial numbers, UD-1 through UD-6.

=== 1900D ===
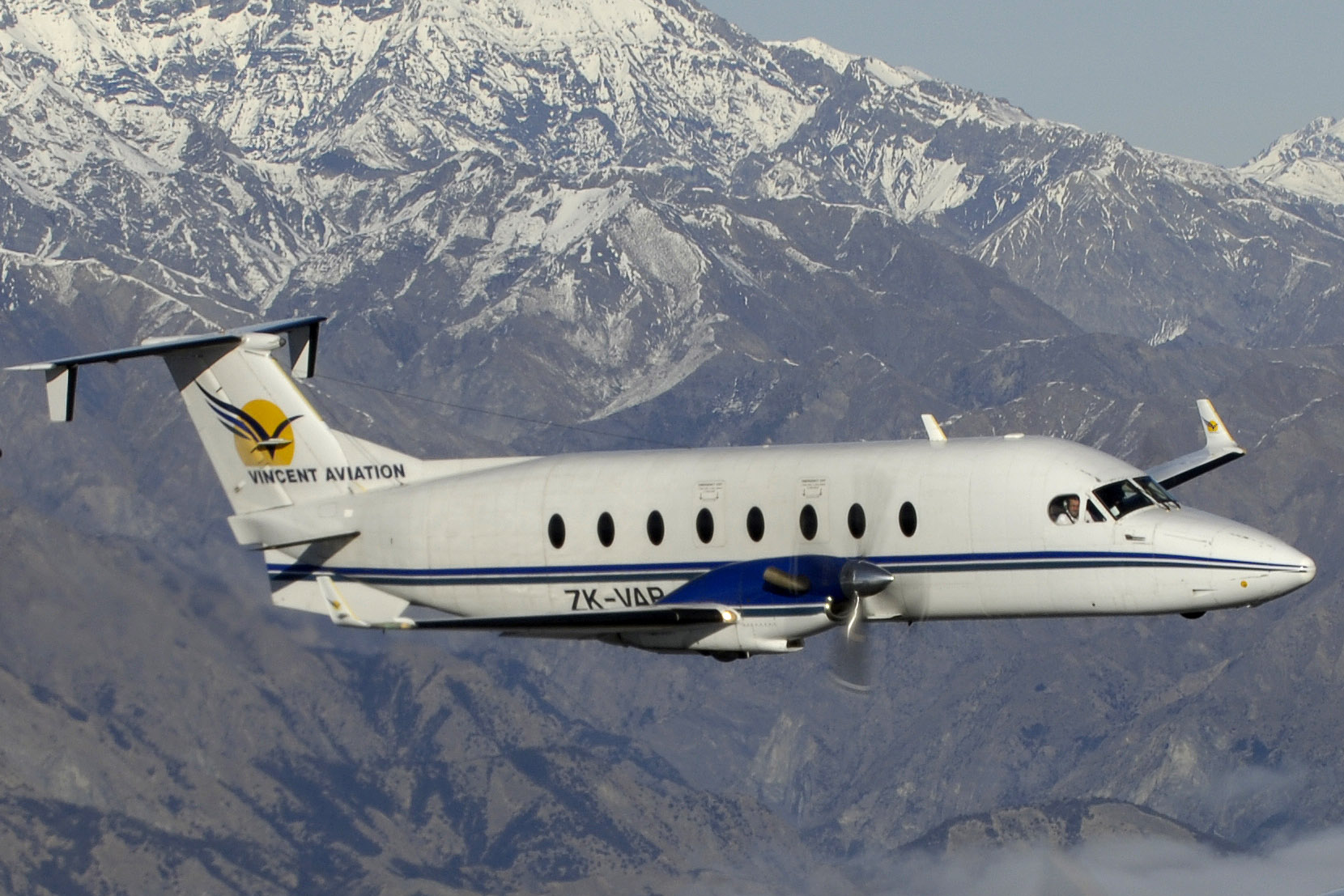
The 1900D has a larger cabin to allow passengers to walk upright inside

While the 1900C had become a popular regional airliner, Beechcraft undertook a substantial redesign of the aircraft, and in 1991 introduced a new version called the 1900D.

The 1900 and 1900C, like most 19-passenger airliners and small business jets, have fairly small passenger cabins, with ceilings so low that passengers (of typical male heights) cannot walk through the interior without bending forward. The 1900D was designed to remedy this by providing a "stand-up cabin", which would allow most passengers to walk upright. It is one of only two 19-seat airliners with this feature, the other being the British Aerospace Jetstream 31/32.

Because the taller passenger cabin adds both weight and drag to the airplane, other elements of the 1900D were also changed. More powerful engines and modified propellers were installed, winglets were added to reduce drag and increase the wings' efficiency, and the tail was made larger in response to the more powerful engines. The cockpit was updated with an Electronic Flight Instrument System (EFIS). The 1900D was certified under the then-new FAR Part 23 "Commuter Category" standards, which had replaced the earlier SFAR 41C. Since the UD serial numbers were already in use by the military 1900s, the 1900D airplanes have serial numbers beginning with UE. The 1900D is the most popular version of the airliner, with 439 of the 1900D built.

=== Super Freighter ===
A supplemental type certificate has been awarded to Alpine Air Express to convert 1900D into cargo aircraft. The STC involved adding a second emergency exit to the cockpit and converting the interior to a cargo configuration. The 1900D can carry 900 cubic feet (25 cubic meters) of cargo, 30% more than a 1900C. Powered by PT6-67D, the super freighter has a max takeoff weight of 17,120 pounds (7,770 kilograms) and is certified under the commuter category. Due to its standup cabin, the 1900D has a large internal volume. The large volume lends the aircraft well to the cargo industry where many packages are bulky and low in density. The 1900D is able to carry nearly as much volume as an EMB-120 and is certified for single pilot cargo operations. The single pilot crew and surplus of airframes allows for reduced operator costs.

=== Military C-12J ===
The U.S. military designation for the Beechcraft 1900C is C-12J. This is a variant of the C-12 Huron, which is the most common designation for military King Airs. The C-12J includes the six Beechcraft 1900s with 'UD' serial number prefixes built for the U.S. military, as well as other 1900Cs in U.S. military service.

Examples of C-12J aircraft in military service include one used for GPS jamming tests at the 586th Flight Test Squadron, Holloman Air Force Base, New Mexico, and three based at the 459th Airlift Squadron, Yokota Air Base, Japan. The U.S. Army operates both C-12J and 1900D aircraft along with other C-12 (King Air) aircraft.

=== King Air ExecLiner ===
The King Air ExecLiner was a marketing name for a corporate version of the Beechcraft 1900C.

== Operators ==
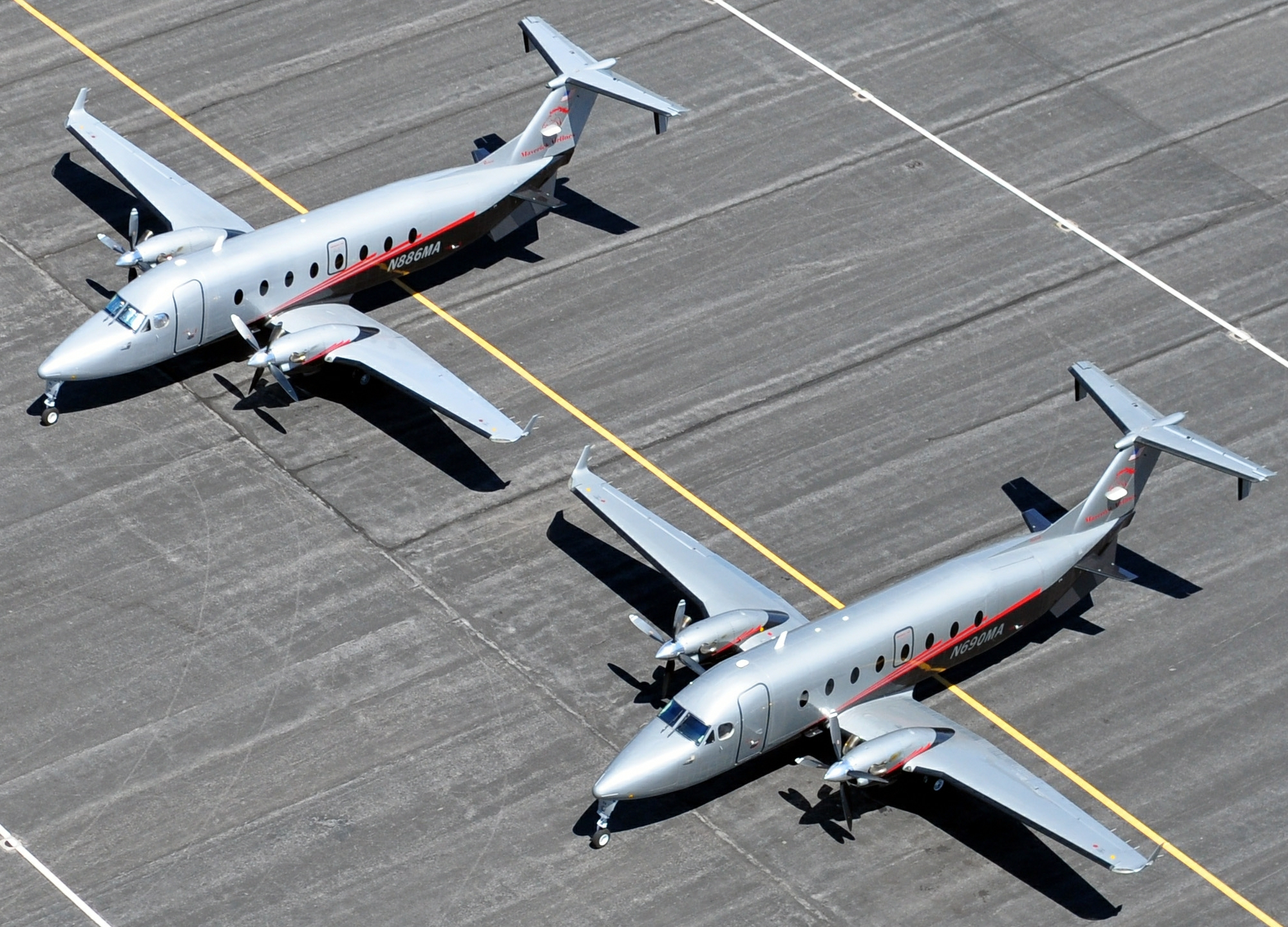
Two 1900Ds of Maverick Airlines

=== Civilian operators ===
In July 2018, a total of 114 1900Cs and 192 1900Ds were in airline service: 207 in the Americas, 63 in Africa, 25 in Europe and 11 in the Asia Pacific and Middle East. Airline operators with nine or more aircraft were:

- Air Georgian
- Alaska Central Express
- Alpine Air Express
- Ameriflight
- Central Mountain Air
- EastIndo
- Exploits Valley Air Services
- Gum Air
- Guna Airlines
- North Cariboo Air
- Northern Thunderbird Air
- Pacific Coastal Airlines
- Propair Inc
- Searca
- Shamwari Air Shuttle
- SkyLink Express
- Solenta Aviation
- SonAir
- Trans Guyana Airways
- Tropic Air
- Twin Jet
- Helicol
- Rise Air

=== Current operators ===
Jonair, with 2 of the model 1900C.

=== Military operators ===
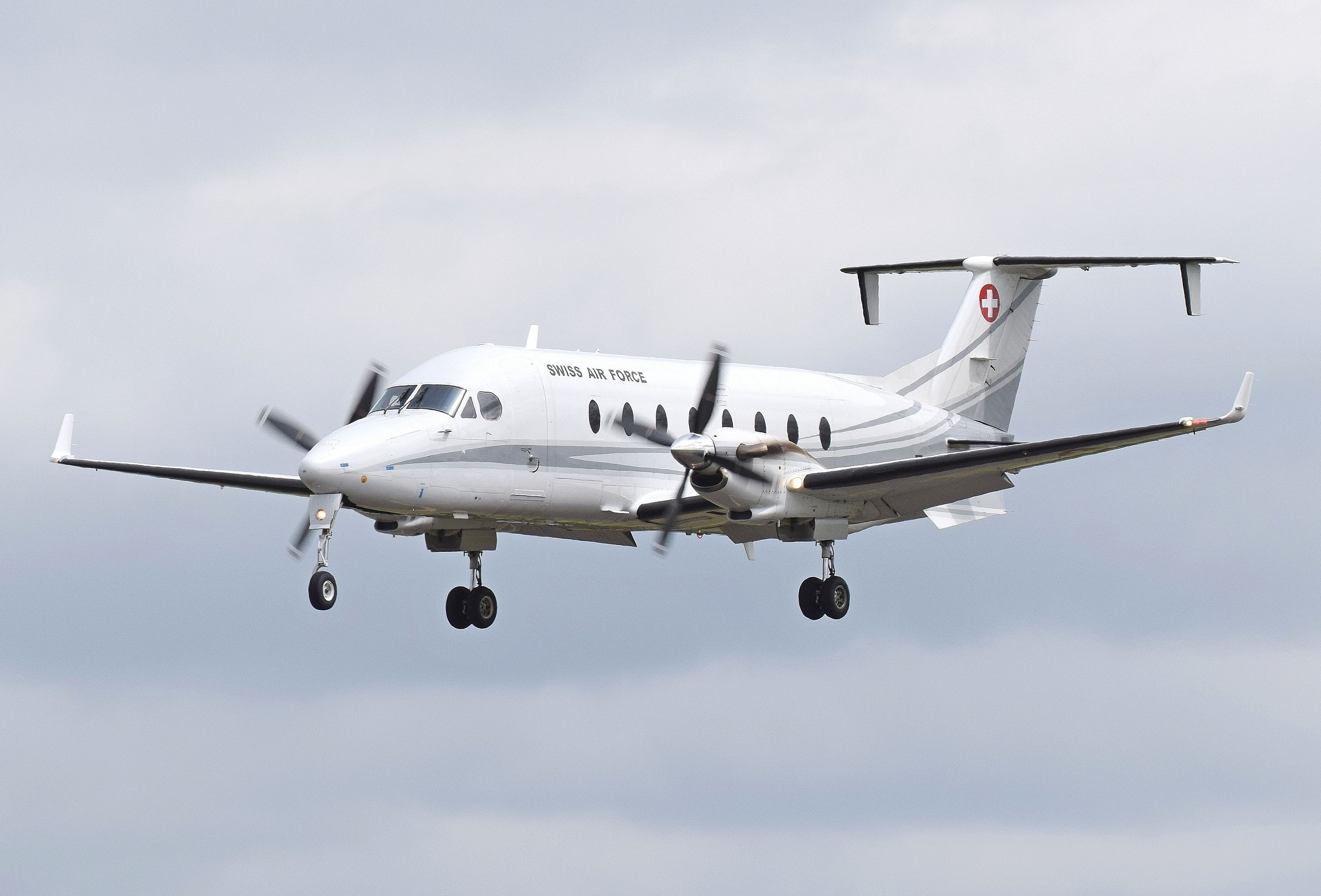
A 1900D of the Swiss Air Force arrives at the 2016 RIAT, England.

Algeria

- Algerian Air Force

Colombia

- Colombian National Police

Egypt

- Egyptian Air Force

France

- Police Nationale

Myanmar

- Myanmar Air Force

South Sudan

- South Sudan Air Force

Switzerland

- Swiss Air Force

Taiwan

- Republic of China Air Force

United States

- United States Air Force
- United States Army
- United States Department of State

Zambia

- Zambian Air Force

== Accidents and incidents ==
- November 23, 1987: a Ryan Air Services 1900 crashed on approach to the airport at Homer, Alaska. Flight 103 was fully loaded (all 19 seats occupied; 1437 pounds of cargo) when it took off from Kodiak. On departure at Kodiak, the aircraft displayed signs of being overloaded when it lifted off the runway, fell back and accelerated for about another 15 knots (17 mph) before it became airborne. The aircraft was approaching Homer when it was cleared for the localizer/DME approach to runway 3. The crew reported a 2-mile (3.2 km) final five minutes later. On short final the wings were seen to rock back and forth; the aircraft then dropped steeply to the ground in a rather flat attitude, struck the airport perimeter fence and slid to a stop on its belly. Both pilots and sixteen of the nineteen passengers were killed. The investigation into the crash (the first crash of a 1900) stated the probable cause as "the failure of the flight crew to properly supervise the loading of the airplane which resulted in the center of gravity being displaced to such an aft location that the airplane control was lost when the flaps were lowered for landing."
- May 18, 1990: a 1900C, operating for Aerolift Philippines as Flight 075 to Surigao, took off from runway 13 at Manila's international airport. During takeoff the no. 2 engine failed. The airplane began turning to the right as the crew radioed that they were returning to the airport. With the undercarriage down and the flaps still in takeoff position the airplane impacted a house in the suburban Paranaque neighborhood. All 21 on board the aircraft and a family of four inside the house were killed making the crash the deadliest accident involving the Beechcraft 1900.
- August 21, 1990: a Republic of China Air Force 1900C crashed in Yunlin County in central Taiwan, killing 18 officers on board.
- December 28, 1991: a Business Express Airlines 1900C crashed in Rhode Island during a training flight when the instructor refused to take back the controls after the students became disoriented due to heavily stressing conditions imposed by the instructor, against the company's flight manual. This conclusion was controversial, as an investigation by the Airline Pilots Association showed that there were many indications of catastrophic airframe failure, not due to pilot error.
- January 3, 1992: CommutAir Flight 4821 crashed in Gabriels, New York while on approach to Adirondack Regional Airport, killing the first officer and one passenger.
- December 7, 1995: an Air St. Martin 1900D drifted off course and crashed into a mountain in Haiti, killing all 20 people on board.
- November 19, 1996: a United Express 1900C collided on a runway with a Beechcraft King Air at Quincy Regional Airport in Illinois, killing all 14 people on board both aircraft.
- July 30, 1998: Proteus Airlines Flight 706, a 1900D, collided in midair with a Cessna 177RG over Quiberon Bay in France. None of the 14 passengers and crew survived.
- January 4, 1999: Régionnair Flight 1707, a 1900C, crashed on approach to Saint-Augustin Airport in Quebec, Canada. All of the 12 passengers and crew survived.
- August 12, 1999: Régionnair Flight 347, a 1900D, crashed on approach to Sept-Îles Airport in Quebec, Canada. Out of the four occupants on board, the captain was killed, while the first officer and the two passengers survived with injuries.
- March 17, 2001: A Sociedade de Aviação Ligeira 1900C crashed in Quilemba, Angola, killing 16 of the 17 people on board.
- December 9, 2002: A Beechcraft 1900C crashed into the mountains near Mena, Arkansas during a delivery flight. All three people on board were killed, including the president of Hageland Aviation Services, the aircraft's intended customer.
- January 8, 2003: Air Midwest Flight 5481, a 1900D, crashed into a hangar just after takeoff from Charlotte/Douglas International Airport in North Carolina, killing all 21 people on board.
- August 26, 2003: Colgan Air Flight 9446, a 1900D operated for US Airways Express, hit the water shortly after taking off from Hyannis, Massachusetts. Both pilots died.
- January 28, 2004, a Tasili Airlines 1900D crashed on approach to Noumérat – Moufdi Zakaria Airport, killing the first officer.
- March 16, 2004: A 1900C operating for the United States Air Force crashed on approach to the Tonopah Test Range Airport in Nevada, killing all five people on board.
- June 18, 2007: Eagle Airways Flight 2300, a Beechcraft 1900D operated for Air New Zealand Link, performed a belly-landing after the landing gears malfunctioned due to hydraulic failure, and all 17 on board survived.
- March 15, 2008: A Wings Aviation 1900D crashed in Obanliku, Nigeria, killing all three people on board.
- May 2, 2008: a South Sudan Air Connection 1900 leased from CemAir crashed, killing 22 people including South Sudan's Minister of Defense Dominic Dim Deng.
- November 9, 2009: a 1900D of Bluebird Aviation crashed during a single-engine landing at Wilson Airport in Nairobi, Kenya, killing the captain and seriously injuring the first officer.
- November 5, 2010: JS Air Flight 201, a 1900C flying for JS Air (Private) Limited, experienced engine failure and crashed shortly after takeoff from Jinnah International Airport, Karachi, killing all 21 on board including both crew members.
- September 25, 2011: a Buddha Air 1900D crashed in Nepal during a return scenic flight from the Himalayas killing 19 on board including 3 crew.
- March 8, 2013: Alaska Central Express Flight 51, a 1900C crashed into mountains on approach to Dillingham Airport, killing 2 on board.
- April 7, 2013: a 1900C disappeared with one occupant on board, the missionary Jerry Krause.
- February 11, 2015: A Panamericano 1900C experienced an engine failure after takeoff from Miami Executive Airport and crashed while attempting to make an emergency landing, killing all four people on board.
- February 9, 2016: a Myanmar Air Force 1900D crashed shortly after taking off from Naypyidaw Airport killing 5 officers on board.
- June 10, 2021: a Myanmar Air Force 1900D crashed on approach to Anisakan Airport, killing 12 of the 16 people on board.
- January 29, 2025: A Light Air Services Beechcraft 1900D, that was carrying oil workers, crashed near Unity Oil Field, South Sudan. 20 out of the 21 people on board were killed.
- January 28, 2026: SATENA Flight 8849, a 1900D, crashed along Colombia's border with Venezuela while descending into Aguas Claras Airport, killing all 15 occupants on board.
- On 5 March 2026, a Beechcraft 1900D operated by the Algerian Air Force crashed shortly after takeoff from Boufarik Airport, Blida Province, Algeria. Four crew members were killed and two others were injured. An investigation into the cause of the crash was launched by Algerian authorities.

== Specifications (Beechcraft 1900D) ==
Data from Raytheon: Beechcraft 1900D Passenger Specifications and Performance

General characteristics

- Crew: 1 (2 for airline operations)
- Capacity: 19 passengers and 6,356 lb (2,882 kg) useful load
- Length: 57 ft 8 in (17.62 m)
- Wingspan: 57 ft 9 in (17.64 m)
- Height: 15 ft 5 in (4.72 m)
- Empty weight: 10,874 lb (4,932 kg)
- Gross weight: 17,227 lb (7,814 kg)
- Max takeoff weight: 17,120 lb (7,764 kg)
- Fuel capacity: 4,458 lb (2,022 kg)
- Fuel type: Jet A recommended, others usable
- Powerplant: 2 × Pratt & Whitney Canada PT6A-67D turboprops, 1,279 shp (955 kW) each

Performance

- Cruise speed: 280 kn (322 mph, 518 km/h) at 20,000 ft (6,100 m)
- Range: 382 nmi (439 mi, 707 km) with 19 passenger payload
- Ferry range: 1,245 nmi (1,432 mi, 2,306 km)
- Service ceiling: 25,000 ft (7,620 m)
- Rate of climb: 2,615 ft/min (13.28 m/s)

Avionics

- Rockwell Collins EFIS-84 Electronic Flight Instrument System

== See also ==
Related development

- Beechcraft Queen Air
- Beechcraft King Air
- Beechcraft Super King Air
- Beechcraft Model 99

Aircraft of comparable role, configuration, and era

- Antonov An-38
- British Aerospace Jetstream
- Dornier 228
- Embraer EMB 110 Bandeirante
- Fairchild Swearingen Metroliner
- Let L-410 Turbolet

Related lists

- List of military aircraft of the United States

== Sources ==
- Francillon, René J (January 2001). "1900 for 2000: The 'Son of Beech' - Raytheon 1900 Airliner". Air International. pp. 56–58. ISSN 0306-5634.
- Hoyle, Craig (December 8–14, 2015). "World Air Forces Directory". Flight International. Vol. 188, no. 5517. pp. 26–53. ISSN 0015-3710.
- Hoyle, Craig (December 4–10, 2018). "World Air Forces Directory". Flight International. Vol. 194, no. 5665. pp. 32–60. ISSN 0015-3710..
- Hoyle, Craig (2020). "World Air Forces 2021". Flight International.
- Jackson, Paul (2003). Jane's All the World's Aircraft 2003–2004. Coulsdon, UK: Jane's Information Group Limited. ISBN 978-0-7106-2537-3.
- Phillips, Edward H. Beechcraft – Pursuit of Perfection, A History of Beechcraft Airplanes. Flying Books, Eagan, Minnesota 1992.ISBN 0-911139-11-7
