= Discovery Air (Nigeria) =

Airline based in Lagos, 2014–2015

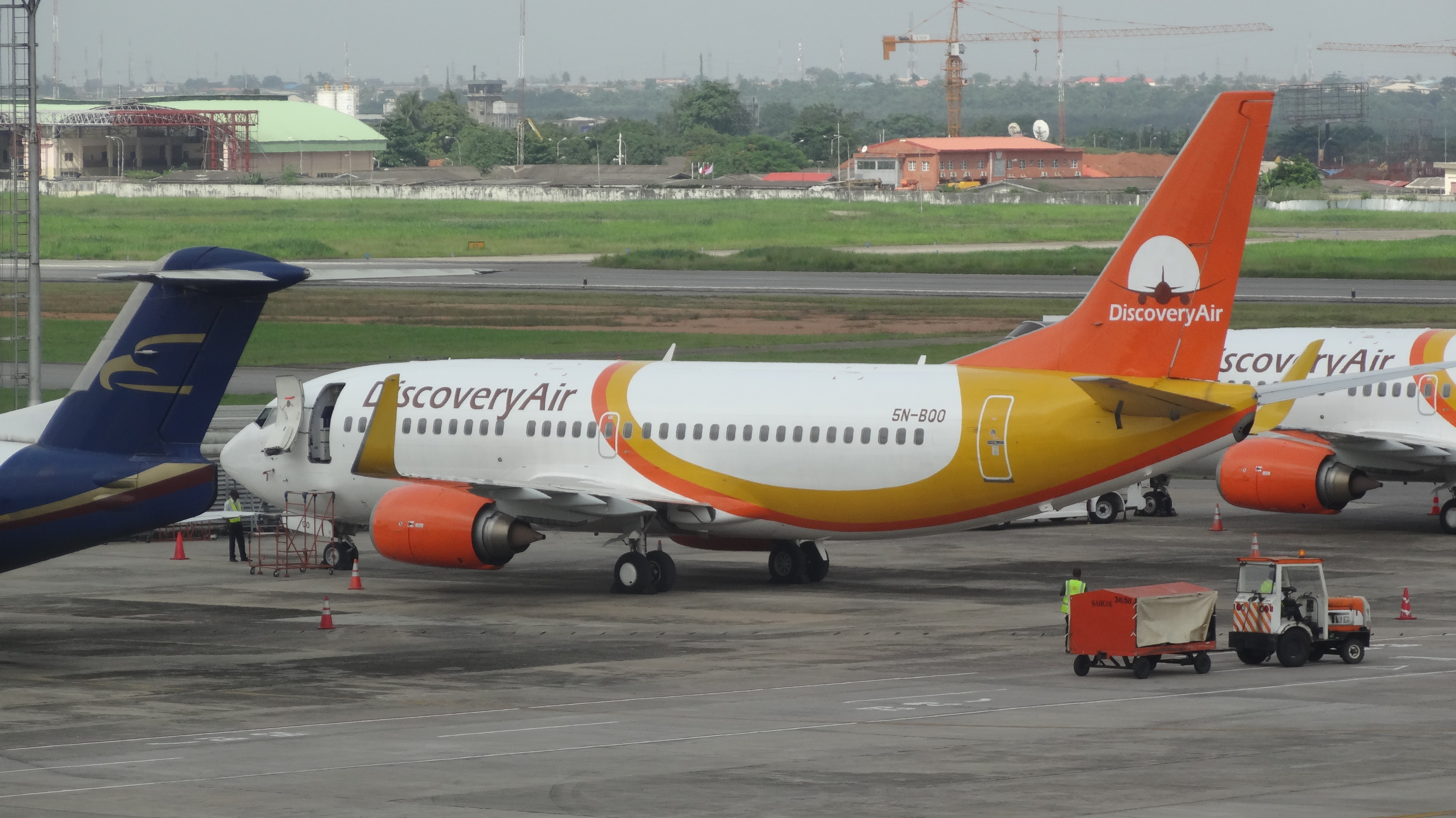
IATA	ICAO	Call sign
DO	DCV	DISCOVERY JET
- Founded: July 23 2008 (incorporated)
- Commenced operations: June 9 2014
- Ceased operations: 2015
- Hubs: Murtala Muhammed International Airport
- Fleet size: 2
- Destinations: 3
- Parent company: First Deepwater Discovery

Discovery Air was a short-lived Nigerian airline based in Lagos that operated the Boeing 737-300 from 2014 to 2015. It was owned by First Deepwater Discovery. It was one of many short lived Nigerian carriers.

== History ==
The airline was incorporated on July 23, 2008, and acquired two Boeing 737-300 aircraft in 2013. It launched with flights between Lagos and Abuja in June 2014. It ceased operations after seven months in 2015 when its AOC was revoked by the Nigerian Civil Aviation Authority. It did take steps to lift the suspension but the suspension was never lifted. It planned to use the Bombardier CRJ 200. It was owned by First Deepwater Discovery.

== Destinations ==
Discovery planned to serve the following destinations, with only very few materializing because if its early dissolution.

=== Ghana ===
- Accra

=== Nigeria ===
- Lagos
- Abuja
- Port Harcourt
- Owerri
- Sokoto
- Asaba
- Benin

=== Senegal ===
- Dakar

== Fleet ==
- 2x 737-300
- CRJ 200 (planned)

== See also ==
List of defunct airlines of Nigeria
