= GAS Air Nigeria =

Nigerian-based cargo airline (1973–2000)

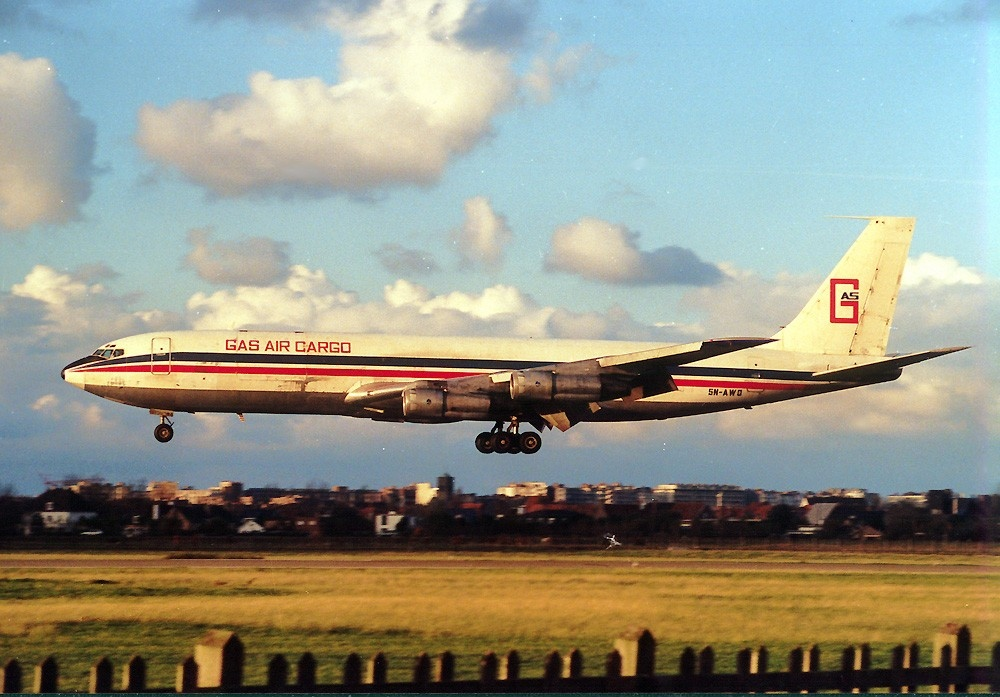
- GAS Air Cargo may have been a sibling company to GAS Air Nigeria
IATA	ICAO	Call sign
GR	NGS	-
- Founded: 1973
- Ceased operations: 2000
- Hubs: Murtala Muhammed International Airport
- Fleet size: Boeing 707, BAC 1-11
- Destinations: charters

GAS Air Nigeria was a Nigerian-based cargo airline that existed from 1973 to 2000. It operated scheduled freight and charter services domestically and internationally in East Africa and Europe along with services in Nigeria. It is currently out of business and was never IOSA certified and operated the Boeing 707. There was also similarly named GAS Air Cargo which had the same IATA and ICAO codes and existed from 1973 to 2000 which focused on cargo charters in West Africa.

== Fleet ==
- Boeing 707
- BAC 1-11

== Accidents and incidents ==
On 14 December 1988, a Boeing 707 registered as 5N-AYJ operated by GAS Air Cargo crashed, initially it was on approach to Cairo-Intl Airport, the aircraft went on to divert to Luxor since the weather there was better, while approaching Luxor from the north, the crew declared an emergency due to low fuel and crashed into houses killing all eight people on board and one on the ground.

On 29 April 1992, a Boeing 707 registered as 9G-RBO operated by GAS Air Cargo were doing a training flight when the first officer accidentally raised the landing gear. All three occupants survived.

== See also ==
List of defunct airlines of Nigeria
