= Alaska Central Express Flight 51 =

2013 aviation accident

Coordinates: 59.326°N 158.297°W

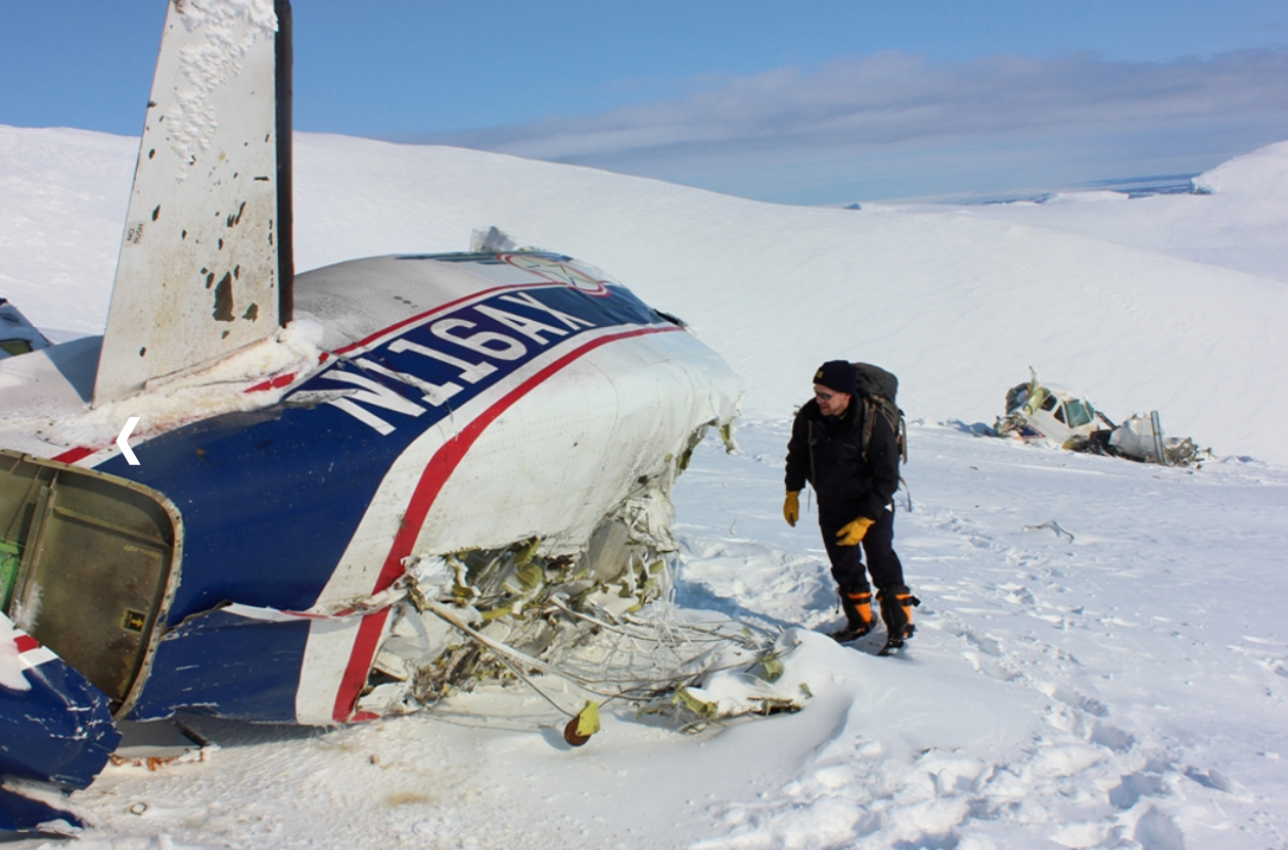
- Wreckage of Flight 51

Accident
- Date: 8 March 2013
- Summary: Controlled flight into terrain
- Site: Muklung Hills, 17 miles NE of Dillingham, Alaska

Aircraft
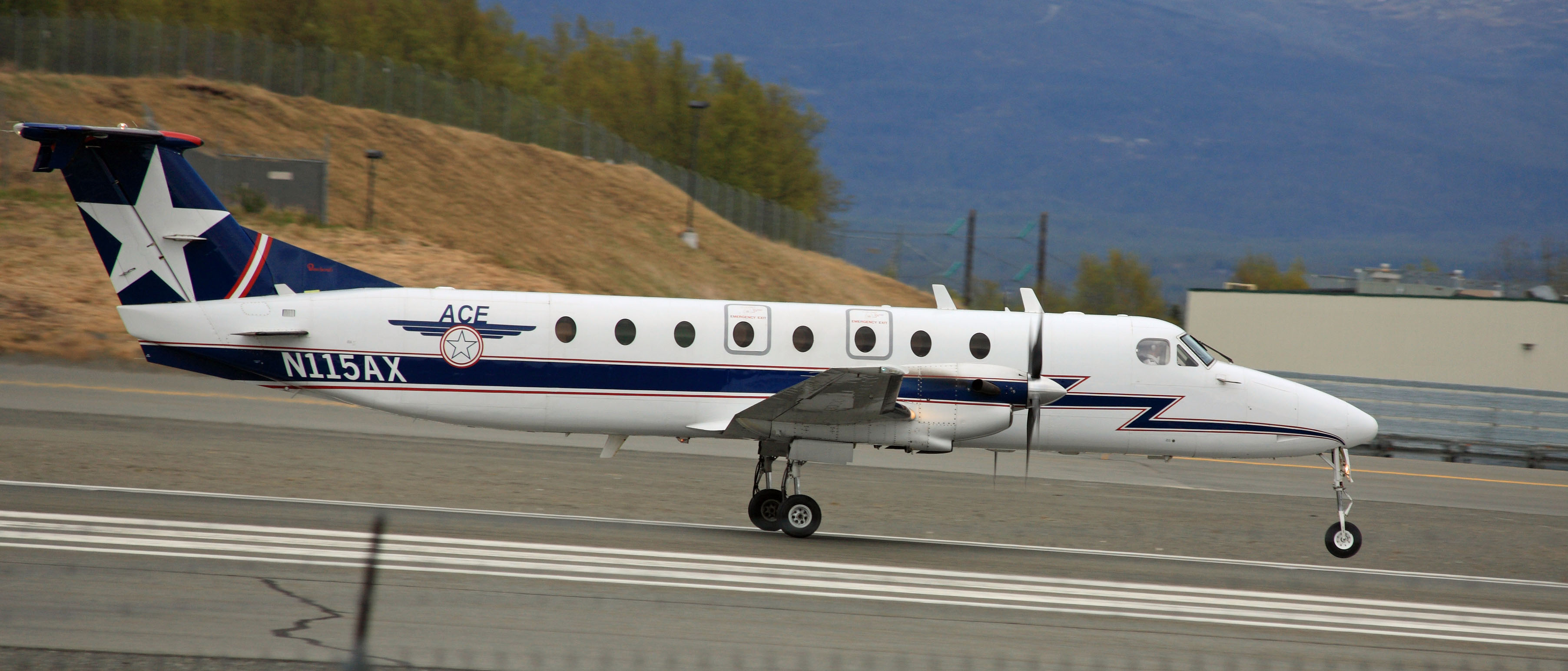
- An Alaska Central Express Beechcraft 1900C-1 identical to the one involved
- Aircraft type: Beechcraft 1900C-1
- Operator: Alaska Central Express
- ICAO flight No.: AER51
- Call sign: ACE AIR 51
- Registration: N116AX
- Flight origin: King Salmon Airport, King Salmon, Alaska
- Destination: Dillingham Municipal Airport, Dillingham, Alaska
- Occupants: 2
- Crew: 2
- Fatalities: 2
- Survivors: 0

Alaska Central Express Flight 51 was an Alaska Central Express flight from Anchorage to King Salmon and Dillingham, Alaska. On 8 March 2013, the Beechcraft 1900C-1 serving the flight crashed into a mountain on approach to Dillingham Airport, killing both crew members on board.

== Accident ==
The flight had originally taken off from Anchorage International Airport at approximately 5:44 Alaska Standard Time, making a scheduled stop at King Salmon and continuing to Dillingham. En route to Dillingham, the crew requested a RNAV GPS 19 instrument approach, which was granted by the on-duty controller who directed the crew to maintain an altitude at or above 2,000 ft (610 m). Roughly six minutes later, the crew requested permission to enter into a holding pattern to contact the flight service station for a report on the condition of the runway, which was subsequently granted. The controllers later attempted to contact the aircraft, but were unsuccessful and soon lost radar track of the aircraft, which had crashed at Muklung Hills.

== Aircraft ==
The aircraft, a Beechcraft 1900C-1, serial number UC-17 registered N116AX, was manufactured in 1992, and Alaska Central Express was its only operator, accumulating a total of 29,824 hours before the accident. The aircraft was powered by two Pratt & Whitney Canada PT6A-65B engines and was equipped for flight into icy conditions, but did not carry a cockpit voice recorder or flight data recorder.

== Crew ==
The crew on this flight consisted of only the cockpit crew, 38-year-old Captain Jeff Day and 21-year-old First Officer Neil Jensen with 5,770 flight hours and 470 flight hours, respectively.

== Search and rescue operations ==
The aircraft hit the ground in the Muklung Hills, the same mountainous area where an aircraft carrying nine people crashed in 2010, causing the death of former US Senator Ted Stevens, who was one of the passengers. The rescue operation to reach Flight 51 was carried out by the Alaska Air National Guard, Alaska State Troopers, and United States Coast Guard. The first rescue unit to reach the crash site was an Alaska Air National Guard helicopter, which was unable to land or lower rescuers due to poor weather conditions.

== Investigation ==
The accident was investigated by the National Transportation Safety Board (NTSB) who concluded that the plane crashed due to the flight crew's failure to maintain terrain clearance, which resulted in controlled flight into terrain in instrument meteorological conditions.
