= Amed Air =

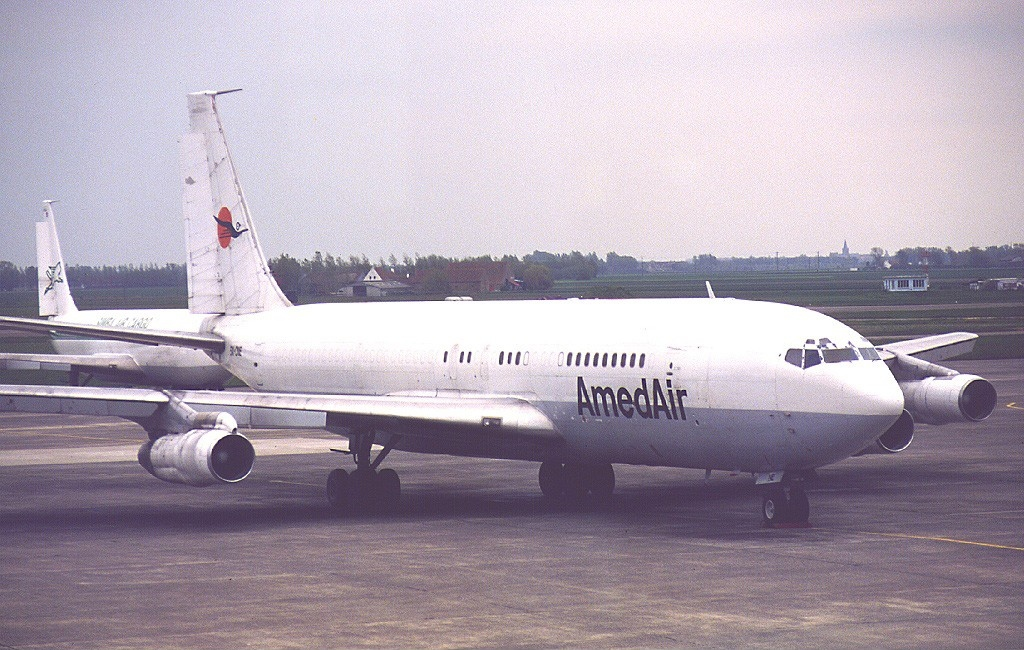
- Amed Air Boeing 707
IATA	ICAO	Call sign
-	OBI	AMED AIR
- Founded: June 8 1994
- Commenced operations: 1995
- Ceased operations: 1996
- Fleet size: 2

Amed Air was a Nigerian-based cargo airline that existed from 1994 to 1996 that operated the Boeing 707. It was one of 130 airlines in Nigeria that ceased operations within 63 years.

== History ==
Amed Air was incorporated on June 8 1994 and commenced operations with a B 707-324C in 1995. Amed Air acquired its 707 in October 1995. However, by 1996 the airline ceased operations. The 707 was pulled out of service in October 1996. It was broken up in July 2003.

== Fleet ==
- 2x Boeing 707

Amed Air acquired its 707 in October 1995 and was stored Shannon in June 1996, its other Boeing 707 was chartered from Real Aviation ltd.

== See also ==
- List of defunct airlines of Nigeria
