= Aerolift Philippines Flight 075 =

1990 aviation accident in the Philippines

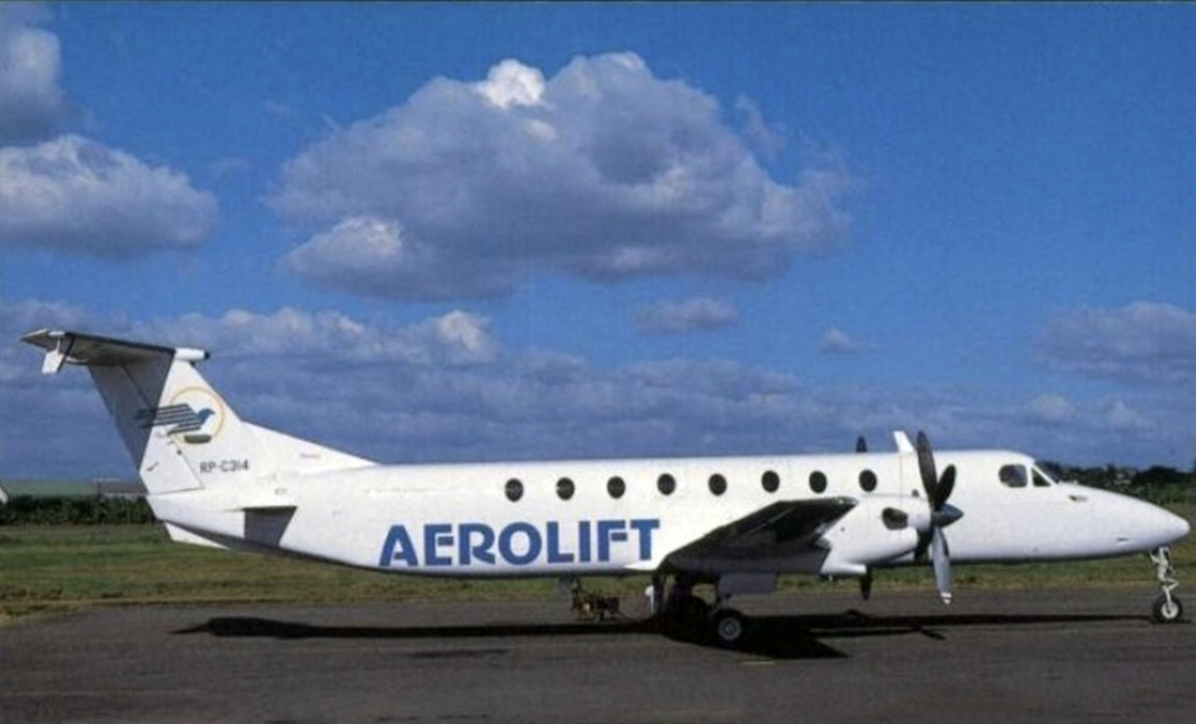
- RP-C314, the aircraft involved in the accident, seen in 1988

Accident
- Date: 18 May 1990
- Summary: EFTO leading to pilot error
- Site: Ninoy Aquino International Airport; 14.492°N 121.02°E
- Total fatalities: 25

Aircraft
- Aircraft type: Beechcraft 1900C
- Operator: Aerolift Philippines
- Registration: RP-C314
- Flight origin: Ninoy Aquino International Airport, Metro Manila, Philippines
- Destination: Surigao Airport, Surigao City, Philippines
- Occupants: 21
- Passengers: 19
- Crew: 2
- Fatalities: 21
- Survivors: 0

Ground casualties
- Ground fatalities: 4

Aerolift Philippines Flight 075 was a scheduled domestic flight from Ninoy Aquino International Airport to Surigao Airport. On 18 May 1990, the Beechcraft 1900 operating the flight crashed just after takeoff, 1 km (0.62 mi; 0.54 nmi) south of the airport, killing all 19 passengers and 2 crew, as well as a family of four on the ground. Flight 75 was the second fatal accident of a Beechcraft 1900 and remains the worst loss of life in a crash involving that model.

== Accident ==
Flight 075 took off from Runway 13 at Manila's international airport just after 6:00 AM local time. During takeoff, the no. 2 engine failed. The airplane began turning to the right as the crew radioed that they were returning to the airport. With the undercarriage down and the flaps still in takeoff position, the airplane impacted a house in the suburban Paranaque neighborhood. All 21 aboard the plane died, and a family of four inside the house were killed. The four casualties on the ground were a Japanese-Filipino family, including two small daughters aged 1 and 4, who had been sleeping together in the bedroom of the house, which was the impact site of the plane.

== Investigation ==
One witness reported seeing the plane's right engine spewing smoke immediately prior to the crash. Investigators said initial findings showed that the right engine of the Beechcraft aircraft failed, and that the plane never gained more than 400 feet (120 m) altitude before plunging to the ground.

The probable cause of the accident was determined to be a failure to maintain adequate flying speed and altitude, due to the pilot's inability to properly perform specified emergency procedures following a malfunction of the right engine immediately after take-off. A contributing factor was a "material failure" of the engine.
