= Estrellas Del Aire =

Mexican passenger airline

| IATA | ICAO | Call sign |
|---|---|---|
| - | ETA | ESTRELLAS |
- Founded: 1991; 35 years ago
- Commenced operations: September 1991; 34 years ago
- Ceased operations: November 1996; 29 years ago
- Operating bases: Lic. Benito Juarez International Airport
- Fleet size: 2
- Parent company: Línea Estrella de Oro
- Employees: 47 (in 1995)

Estrellas del Aire (English: Air Stars) was a Mexican passenger airline. It was established in 1991 by Estrellas de Oro, to complement their existing bus routes throughout Mexico. It was notable for being one of the first airlines in the country to be fully owned by a bus company, similar to VivaAerobús today. The airline had a fleet of two second-hand Douglas DC-9-10 aircraft. In 1996, the Estrellas del Aire fleet and routes out of Mexico City were acquired by Aerolíneas Internacionales and it has not operated since.

Total passengers carried (thousands)(scheduled service only)
| | Estrellas Del Aire |
|---|---|
| 1993 | 73 |
| 1994 | 61.01 |
| 1995 | 54.00 |
| 1996 | 21 |

== Fleet ==
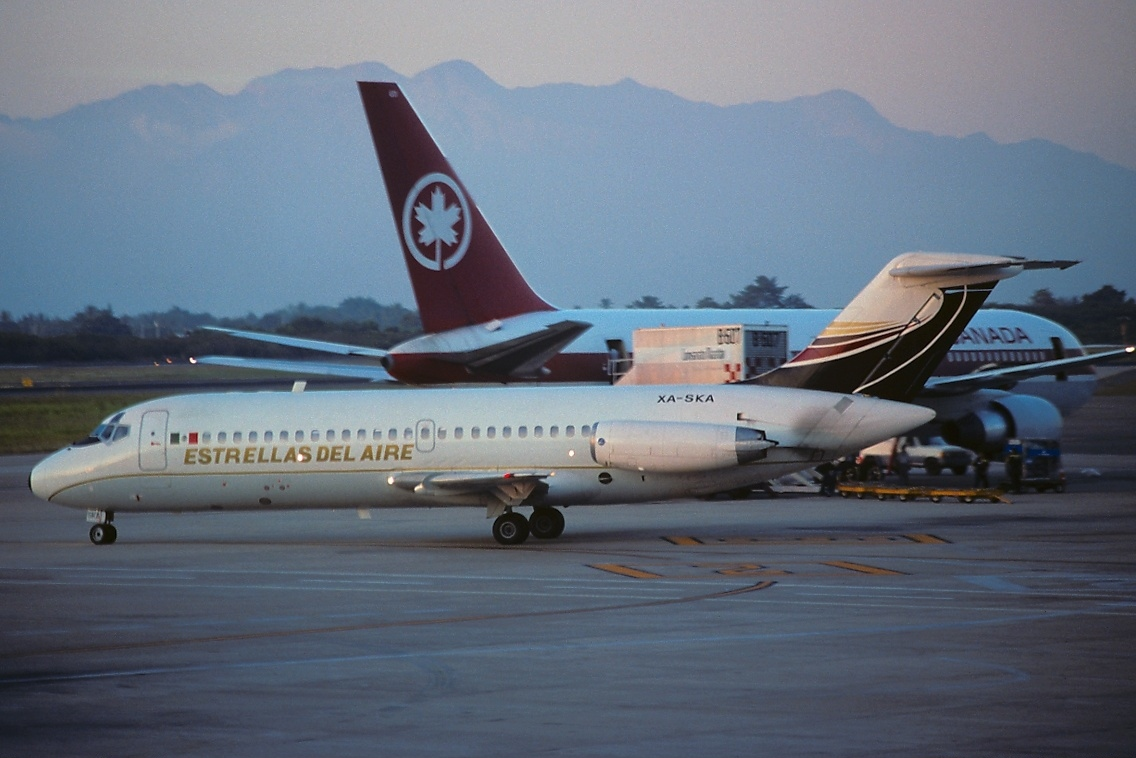
An Estrellas de Aire DC-9 at Puerto Vallarta in January 1994

The aircraft operated by the Estrellas:

Estrellas Del Aire fleet
| Aircraft | Total | Introduced | Retired | Notes |
Jet aircraft
| Douglas DC-9-11 | 2 | 1991 | 1996 | All went to other Mexican airlines |
