= EAS Airlines =

Nigerian airline

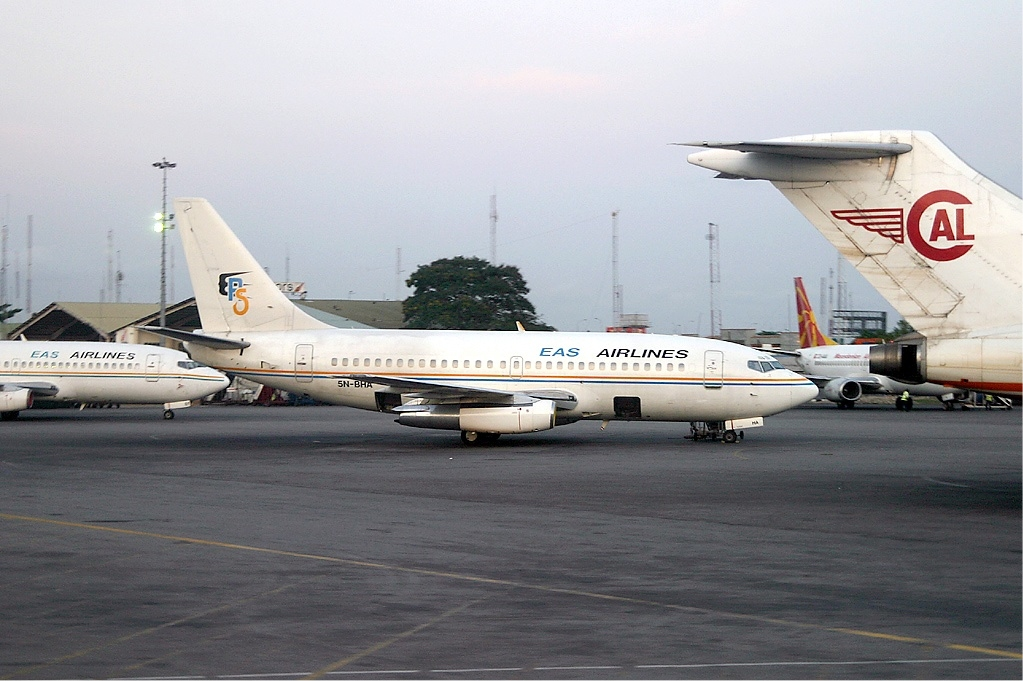
- 737-200s, one in the foreground and one in the back
IATA	ICAO	Call sign
-	EXW	ECHOLINE
- Founded: 1983
- Ceased operations: 2006
- Hubs: Murtala Mohammed International Airport
- Fleet size: 11
- Destinations: 6

EAS (Executive Airlines Services) Airlines was an airline based in Lagos, Nigeria. Its main base was Murtala Mohammed International Airport, Lagos. In July 2006, the airline merged with Fleet Air Nigeria Limited, forming the short-lived Nicon Airways.

== History ==
The airline was established on 23 December 1983 as United Air Service. In 1987 the airline rebranded to EAS Cargo Airlines. EAS Cargo Airlines was renamed to EAS Airlines in 1992. On May 4 2002 EAS Airlines was involved in a fatal accident that killed at least 103 people. In 2005 the airline was effected after all 737-200s operating in Nigeria were grounded. The airline ceased operations in 2006 when it merged with Fleet Air Nigeria which was a subisdiary of Nigerian based NICON Group to form Nicon Airways. Nicon Airways lasted until 2007.

== Destinations ==
EAS Airlines operated services to the following domestic scheduled destinations (at January 2005): Abuja, Enugu, Jos, Lagos and Port Harcourt.

== Fleet ==
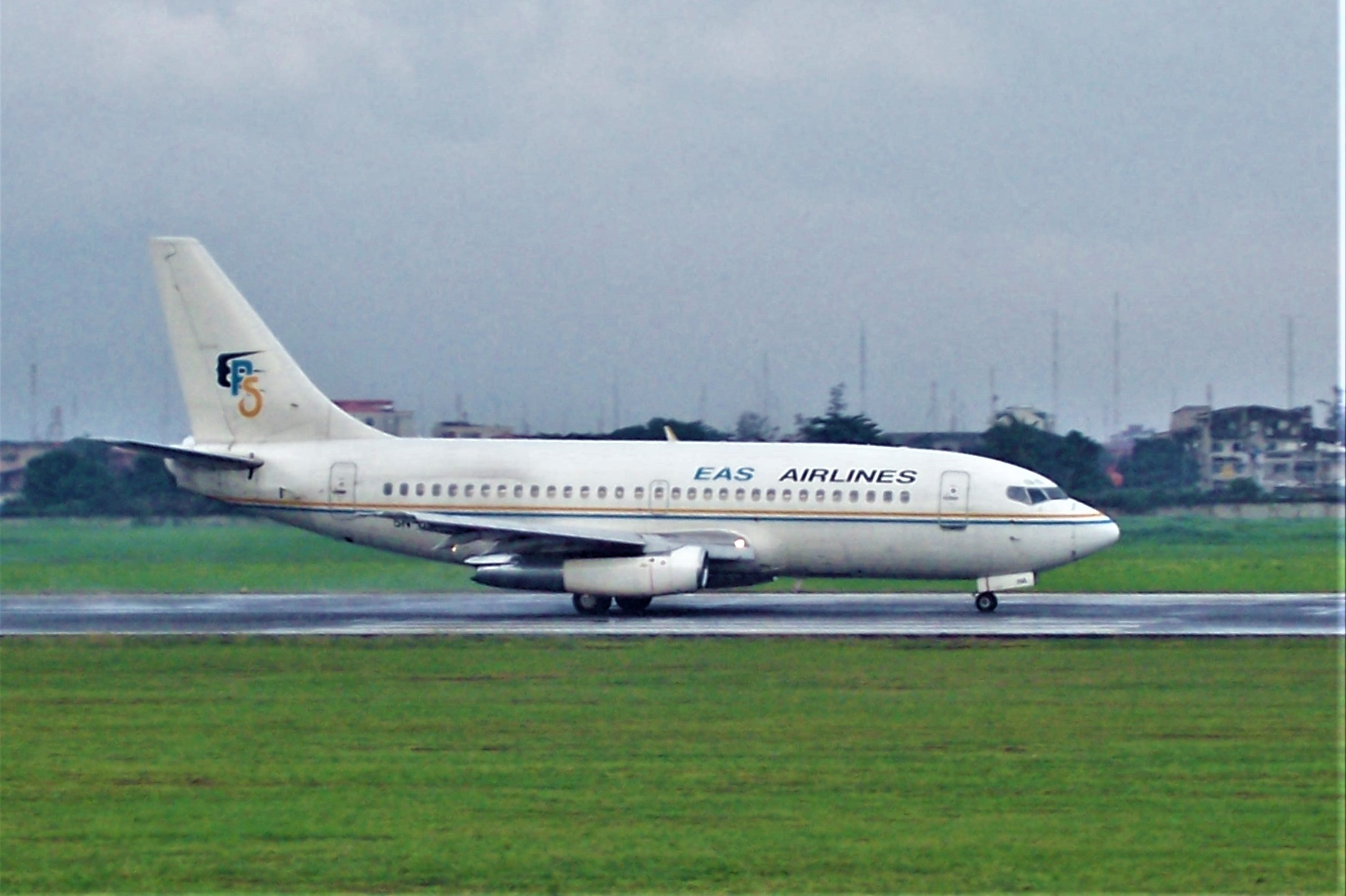
An EAS Airlines Boeing 737-200 at Murtala Muhammad International Airport

The EAS Airlines fleet consisted of the following aircraft:

- 4 – BAC 1-11-500
- 4 – Boeing 707-351C
- 2 – Boeing 737-200
- 1 – Douglas DC-8-55F

== Accidents and incidents ==
- On 4 May 2002, a BAC 111-500 plane crashed into a densely populated neighborhood shortly after take-off from Kano. At least 103 people were killed, many of whom were on the ground.

== See also ==
List of defunct airlines of Nigeria
