= Nicon Airways =

Nigerian airline

IATA	ICAO	Call sign
-	NCN	NICON AIRWAYS
- Founded: 2006
- Ceased operations: 2007
- Hubs: Murtala Muhammed International Airport
- Fleet size: 2
- Destinations: Lagos, Abuja, Jos
- Parent company: Nicon Airways Limited
- Headquarters: Nigeria
- Key people: Jimoh Ibrahim(Chairman/CEO)
- Website: http://www.niconairways.com/ (defunct)

Nicon Airways was a short-lived airline based in Nigeria between 2006 and 2007.

== History ==
In July 2006, Fleet Air Nigeria Limited, a subsidiary of NICON Group, merged with EAS Airlines, thus creating Nicon Airways. Until its closure one year later, the newly formed airline operated domestic services among Lagos, Abuja and Jos.

== Fleet ==
The Nicon Airways fleet consisted of the following aircraft:

- 2 Boeing 737-200.
