= Wings Aviation =

IATA	ICAO	Call sign
–	TWD	TRADEWINGS
- Founded: 2001
- Ceased operations: 2012
- Hubs: Lagos Murtala Muhammed Airport
- Headquarters: Lagos, Nigeria

Wings Aviation was a charter airline based in Lagos, Nigeria. It operates customised air charter services. Its main base is Murtala Mohammed International Airport, Lagos.

== History ==
The Nigerian government set a deadline of 30 April 2007 for all airlines operating in the country to re-capitalise or be grounded, in an effort to ensure better services and safety. The airline satisfied the Nigerian Civil Aviation Authority (NCAA)'s criteria in terms of re-capitalization and was re-registered for operation. It later merged with JedAir.

== Fleet ==
- 1 Raytheon Beech 1900D Airliner
- 1 Beechcraft Super King Air

== Incidents and accidents ==
- Wings Aviation lost an aircraft in 2008, the wreckage was only found after a few months.
