= European Executive =

IATA	ICAO	Call sign
-	ETV	EURO EXEC
- Founded: 2002
- Hubs: Shoreham (Brighton City) Airport
- Fleet size: 2
- Destinations: 4 (scheduled)
- Headquarters: Brighton, United Kingdom
- Website: http://www.euroexec.com/

European Executive was a British airline based in Shoreham, United Kingdom. It operated scheduled passenger flights and corporate, pleasure and freight flights. Its main base was Shoreham (Brighton City) Airport.

== Services ==
European Executive operated charter flights throughout Europe. It then evolved to a scheduled airline, most commonly to Rouen, Guernsey, Le Touquet and Jersey. It was managed by one Dave Chowen, an ex British Airways captain.
