= Easy Link Aviation =

IATA	ICAO	Call sign
-	FYE	FLY ME
- Founded: 2002
- Ceased operations: 2006
- Fleet size: 4
- Parent company: Easy Link Aviation Services
- Headquarters: Nigeria

Easy Link Aviation Services was an airline based in Nigeria.

== History ==
The Nigerian government set a deadline of April 30, 2007 for all airlines operating in the country to re-capitalise or be grounded, in an effort to ensure better services and safety. The airline had since capitalized and is now licensed to operate by the Nigerian Civil Aviation Authority (NCAA) and meet all the criteria in terms of re-capitalization.

== Fleet ==
As of August 2006 the Easy Link fleet included:

- 4 Let L-410 UVP
