= Earth Airlines =

IATA	ICAO	Call sign
-	ERX	EARTH AIR
- Founded: 2002
- Ceased operations: 2007
- Fleet size: 1
- Parent company: Earth Airlines Services Limited
- Headquarters: Lagos, Nigeria

Earth Airlines was an airline based in Lagos, Nigeria.

== History ==
The airline operated charter services from Lagos. It was established and started operations in 2002.

The Nigerian government set a deadline of April 30, 2007 for all airlines operating in the country to re-capitalise or be grounded, in an effort to ensure better services and safety. The airline did not meet the Nigerian Civil Aviation Authority (NCAA)’s criteria in terms of re-capitalization and was re-registered for operation and currently operates no services.

== Fleet ==
The Earth Airlines fleet consisted of the following aircraft (at August 2006):

1 Boeing 737-200
