= Air Midwest (Nigeria) =

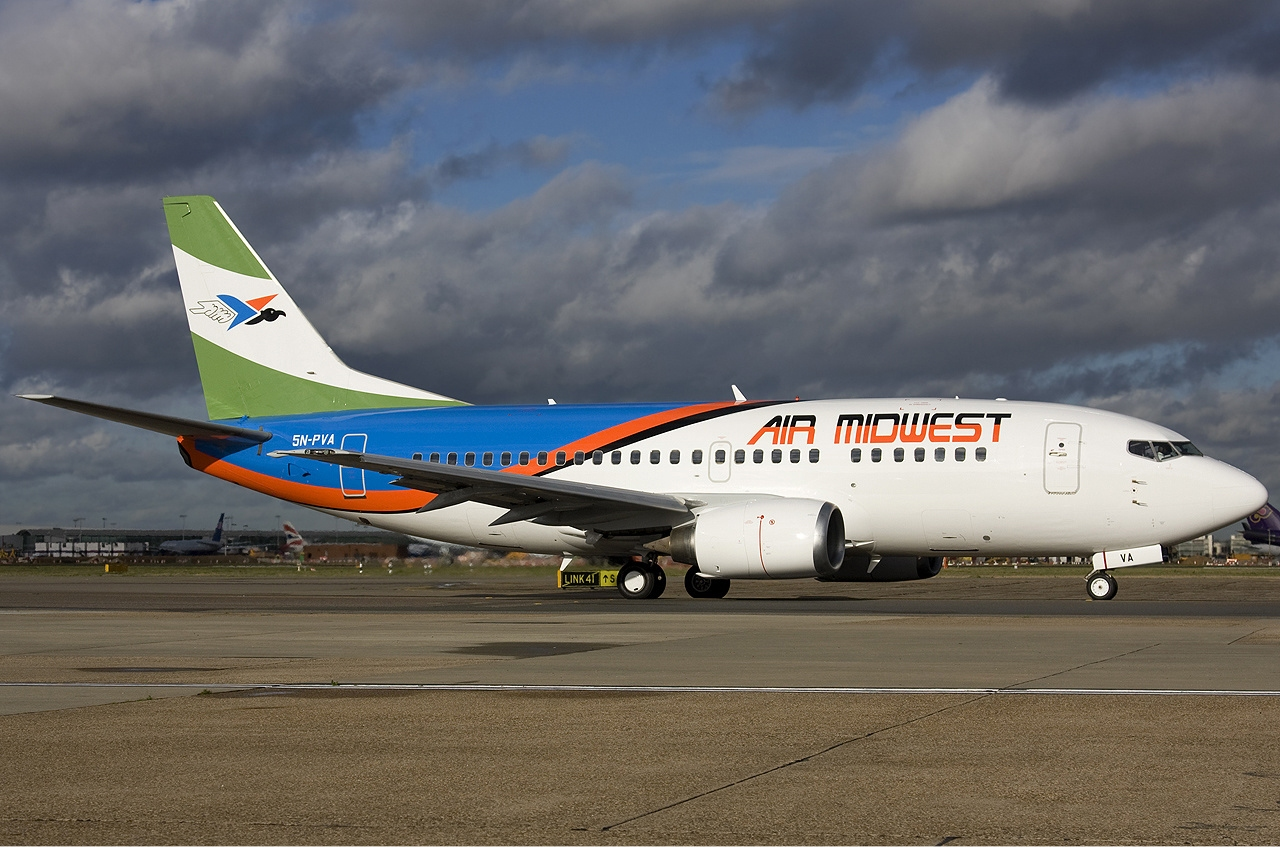
- 737-500 of Air Midwest sitting idle
IATA	ICAO	Call sign
-	VTY	VICTORY
- Founded: 2002
- Ceased operations: 2010
- Fleet size: 1
- Parent company: Air Midwest Limited
- Headquarters: Ikeja, Lagos State, Nigeria
- Website: airmidwestng.org (defunct)

Air Midwest was an upcoming privately owned airline project from Lagos, Nigeria, which was to be based at Murtala Mohammed International Airport. The company has been licensed by the Nigerian Federal Ministry of Aviation to operate commercial flights, but for now, no further steps have been taken towards the full launch of services.

== History ==
Air Midwest was formed in 2002 by two former employees of Kabo Air. It gained an operating license in 2003. Following a number of airline accidents in Nigeria, the Nigerian government asked every airline to recapitalise to a higher level, which delayed Air Midwest's launch. By December 2009, the company had acquired three Boeing 737 aeroplanes.

Air Midwest received a Certificate of Airworthiness from the Nigerian Civil Aviation Authority in February 2010, which entitled the company to operate one Boeing 737-500. Air Midwest's managing director, Otunba Aigbokhan, stated that they intended to launch a network of domestic routes linking Lagos Airport to Benin, Owerri, Abuja and Port Harcourt.

In March 2010 the airline carried out a demonstration of a passenger evacuation. Less than a month later, a test flight from Lagos to Owerri was operated. In the same year, the company was dissolved, though.
