= List of airlines of Nigeria =

This is a list of airlines that have an air operator's certificate issued by the Nigerian Civil Aviation Authority.

== Airlines of Nigeria ==
Airline	Image	ICAO	IATA	Callsign	Hub airport(s)	Notes
Aero		NIG	N2	Aero Contractors	Murtala Muhammed International Airport	
UMZA AIR	UMZA AIR	UY		UMZA AIR	Nnamdi Azikiwe International Airport	
Air Peace		APK	P4	Air Peace	Nnamdi Azikiwe International Airport	
Allied Air		AJK	4W	Bambi	Murtala Muhammed International Airport	
Arik Air		ARA	W3	Arik Air	Murtala Muhammed International Airport, Nnamdi Azikiwe International Airport	
Binani Air						
Cally Air				CALLY	Margaret Ekpo International Airport	
Dornier Aviation Nigeria		DAV		Dana Air	Kaduna Airport	
Engnu Air						
Green Africa Airways		Q9	GWG	Green Africa	Murtala Muhammad International Airport	
Ibom Air		IAN	QI	Ibom Air	Victor Attah International Airport	
K-Impex Airline		APK	P4	KIE BIRD	Nnamdi Azikiwe International Airport	
Max Air		NGL	VM	Max Air	Mallam Aminu Kano International Airport	grounded
NG Eagle						
Overland Airways		OLA	OF	Overland	Nnamdi Azikiwe International Airport	
Pan African Airlines			PF		Murtala Muhammed International Airport	
Rano Air			R4		Maiduguri International Airport	
United Nigeria Airlines		UNA	U5	United Nigeria Airlines	Akanu Ibiam International Airport	
ValueJet (Nigeria)		FVJ	VK	ValueJet	Murtala Muhammed International Airport	
West Link Airlines		WLN		WESTLINK	Nnamdi Azikiwe International Airport	
XEJet		VBR	U0		Murtala Muhammed International Airport	

Umza Aviation services

== See also ==
- List of defunct airlines of Nigeria
- List of airports in Nigeria
- List of airlines

Ibom Air Umza Aviation services
