= ValueJet (Nigeria) =

Nigerian airline

ValueJet Nigeria
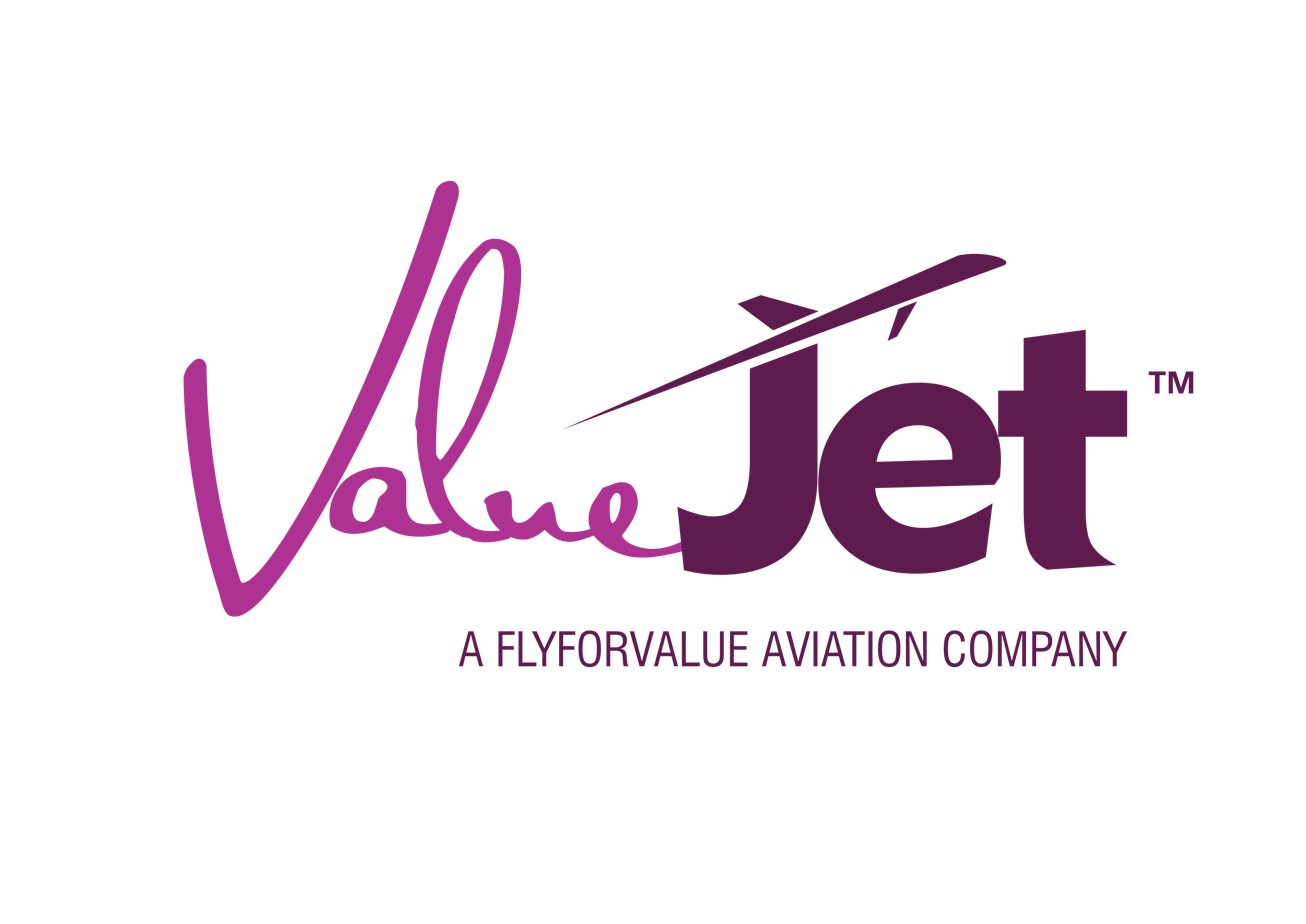
IATA	ICAO	Call sign
VK	FVJ	VALUEJET
- Founded: 2018
- Commenced operations: 2022
- Hubs: Murtala Muhammed International Airport
- Focus cities: Lagos (hub), Abuja, Port Harcourt, Iperu Owerri, Jos, Malabo, Banjul
- Fleet size: 8
- Headquarters: Lagos
- Key people: Kunle Soname
- Employees: 450
- Website: flyvaluejet.com

ValueJet is a Nigerian airline headquartered in Lagos, operating scheduled domestic and regional flights from its hub at Murtala Muhammed International Airport.

== History ==
ValueJet was founded in 2018 by Kunle Soname, chairman of the sports betting website Bet9ja and owner of Portuguese football club C. D. Feirense. The airline commenced operations on 10 October 2022 with flights to Abuja, Port Harcourt, Asaba and Jos.

== Management staff ==
ValueJet is managed by a chairman, managing director, and other senior executives overseeing operations, maintenance, safety, technology, commercial, and other support functions.

Name	Role
Kunle Soname	Chairman
Capt. Omololu Majekodunmi	MD/CEO
Capt. Abdellatif Mechergui	Head Flight Operations
Capt. Kehinde Smith	Director of Operations
Engr. Samuel Marcus	Director of Continuous Airworthiness
Trevor Henry	Head of Commercial (CCO)
Elliot Imaabin	Chief Finance Officer (CFO)
Temitope Ajijola	Head Business Program & IT (CIO)
Capt. Oscar Ikeriounwu	Chief Pilot
Yewande Cole	Head of Ground Operations
Oluwatoyin Ogunsola	Head of Legal
Kamil Odumosu	Group Head, Human Resources
Edward Ige	Cabin Services Manager
Adeniyi Adekala	Head of Security

== Destinations ==
As of January 2023, ValueJet flies to the following destinations in Nigeria.

Country	City	Airport	Notes
Nigeria	Abuja	Nnamdi Azikiwe International Airport	Focus city
Nigeria	Iperu	Gateway International Airport	Local
Nigeria	Owerri	Sam Mbakwe Airport	Local
Nigeria	Jos	Yakubu Gowon Airport	Local
Nigeria	Lagos	Murtala Muhammed International Airport	Hub
Nigeria	Port Harcourt	Port Harcourt International Airport	Local
Nigeria	Calabar	Margaret Ekpo International Airport	Local
Nigeria	Kano	Mallam Aminu International Airport	

=== Locations outside of Nigeria ===
Country	City	Airport	Notes
Equatorial Guinea	Malabo	Saint Isabel Airport	International
Gambia	Banjul	Banjul International Airport	International
Benin	Cotonou	Cadjehoun Airport	International
Ghana	Accra	Accra International Airport	International

=== Interline agreements ===
- Hahn Air

== Fleet ==
As of August 2026, Value Jet operates the following aircraft:

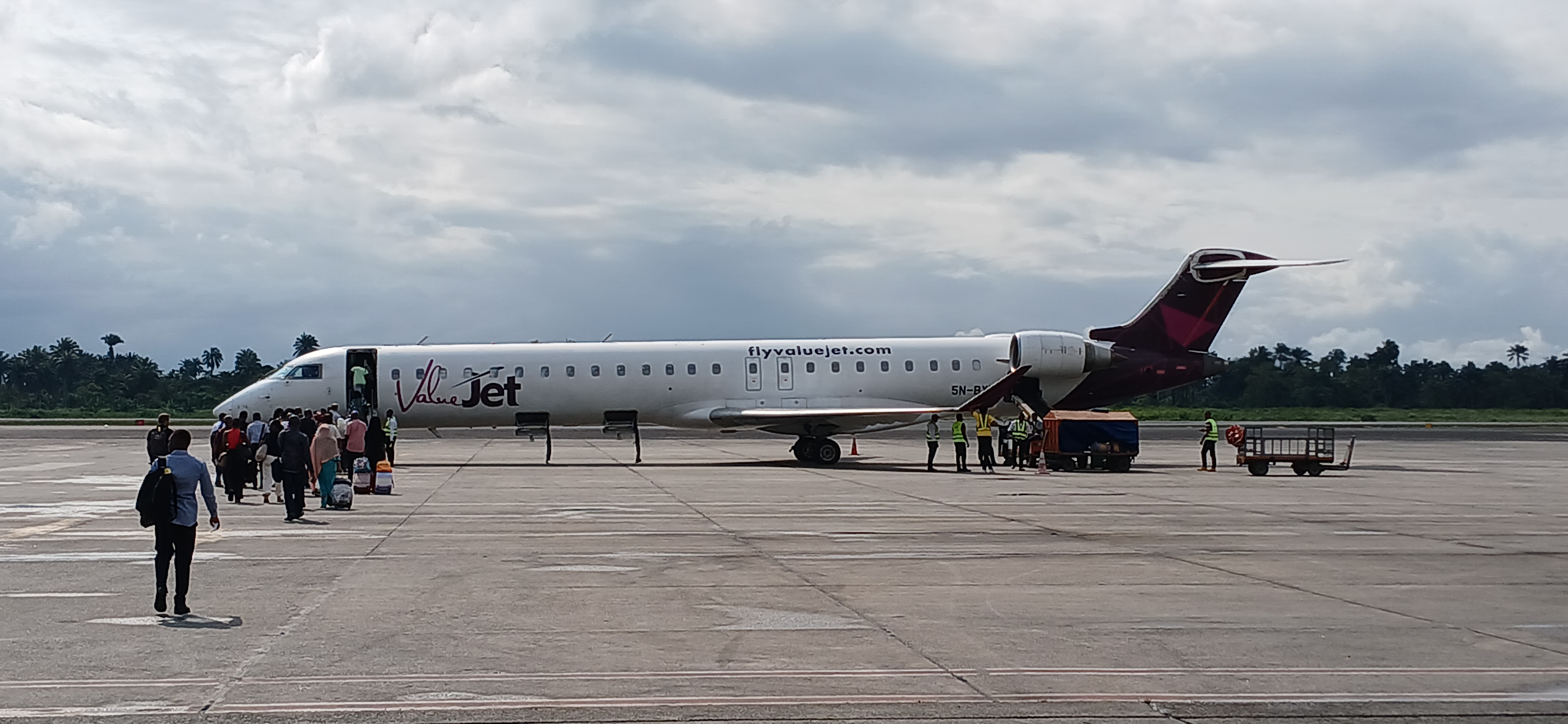
ValueJet CRJ900

Aircraft	In fleet	Orders	Notes
Bombardier CRJ700	1	—	
Bombardier CRJ900	4	—	First two taken over from Air Nostrum.
Bombardier CRJ1000	2	—	
Boeing 737-800	1	—	

== See also ==
- Aero Contractors (Nigeria)
- Air Peace
- Arik Air
- Dana Air
- Ibom Air
- United Nigeria Airlines
