= Enugu Air =

Nigerian airline

- Founded: 7 July 2025; 14 months ago
- Commenced operations: 7 July 2025; 14 months ago
- Operating bases: Akanu Ibiam International Airport
- Fleet size: 6
- Destinations: 6
- Parent company: Enugu State Government
- Headquarters: Enugu, Enugu State, Nigeria
- Website: enuguairlines.ng

Enugu Air is a Nigerian airline owned by the Enugu State Government. Based in Enugu and operating from Akanu Ibiam International Airport, the airline commenced operations on 7 July 2025.

The airline initially operated as a virtual carrier, with flights conducted under the air operator certificate (AOC) of XE Jet, before receiving its own AOC from the Nigeria Civil Aviation Authority in March 2026. As of March 2026, the airline operates domestic services within Nigeria using Embraer regional jets.

== History ==
Enugu Air was inaugurated on 7 July 2025 by the Nigerian Minister of Aviation and Aerospace Development, Festus Keyamo, and operated its first flight on the same day. The airline was established by the Enugu State Government.

At launch, the airline began operations through a partnership with XE Jet, which already held an AOC. According to statements made at the inauguration, this arrangement was adopted to enable the airline to commence services while pursuing its own certification from the Nigeria Civil Aviation Authority. Initial services were operated on domestic routes including Abuja and Lagos, with further destinations including Port Harcourt, Owerri, Benin City and Kano announced.

In industry reporting, Enugu Air was described as a virtual carrier during this initial phase. On 10 March 2026, the Nigeria Civil Aviation Authority presented Enugu Air with its own AOC in Abuja. According to Aviation Week, receipt of the certificate allowed the airline to begin scheduled operations under its own authorization.

== Operations ==
Prior to receiving its own AOC, Enugu Air's services were operated on its behalf by XE Jet. ch-aviation reported in December 2025 that one of the airline's aircraft was active on domestic routes serving Lagos, Abuja, Port Harcourt City and Benin City, while another aircraft was parked at Asaba.

Aviation Week reported in March 2026 that the airline operated to six domestic destinations.

== Destinations ==
Enugu Air operates domestic services within Nigeria. Sources published between July 2025 and March 2026 reported service to, or announced routes including, the following destinations:

- Abuja
- Benin City
- Enugu
- Lagos
- Owerri
- Port Harcourt

== Fleet ==
At launch in July 2025, official and state media sources described the initial fleet as consisting of three aircraft from the Embraer E170 and E190 series. ch-aviation reported in December 2025 that the fleet then comprised two Embraer E170 aircraft and one Embraer E190, all purchased outright by the Enugu State Government.

Aviation Week later reported that the airline had added an Embraer E195 in February 2026.

=== Current fleet ===
As of March 2026, the Enugu Air fleet includes the following aircraft:

Enugu Air fleet
Aircraft	In service	Notes
Embraer E170	2	Some aircraft listed as operated by XE Jet.
Embraer E190	1	
Embraer E195	3	
Total	6	

=== Fleet development ===
In his 2026 budget speech to the Enugu State House of Assembly, Governor Peter Mbah said that the state planned to expand Enugu Air's fleet to as many as 20 aircraft by the end of 2026. As of March 2026, independent reporting indicated that the airline remained in an early stage of development despite fleet growth.

== Accidents and incidents ==
- On 23 July 2026, an Enugu Air Embraer ERJ-170 aircraft overshot the runway and veered into the surrounding bush after landing at the Benin Airport. All occupants safely evacuated the aircraft.

== See also ==
- Ibom Air
- Air Peace
- Akanu Ibiam International Airport
