= Cally Air =

Nigerian airline

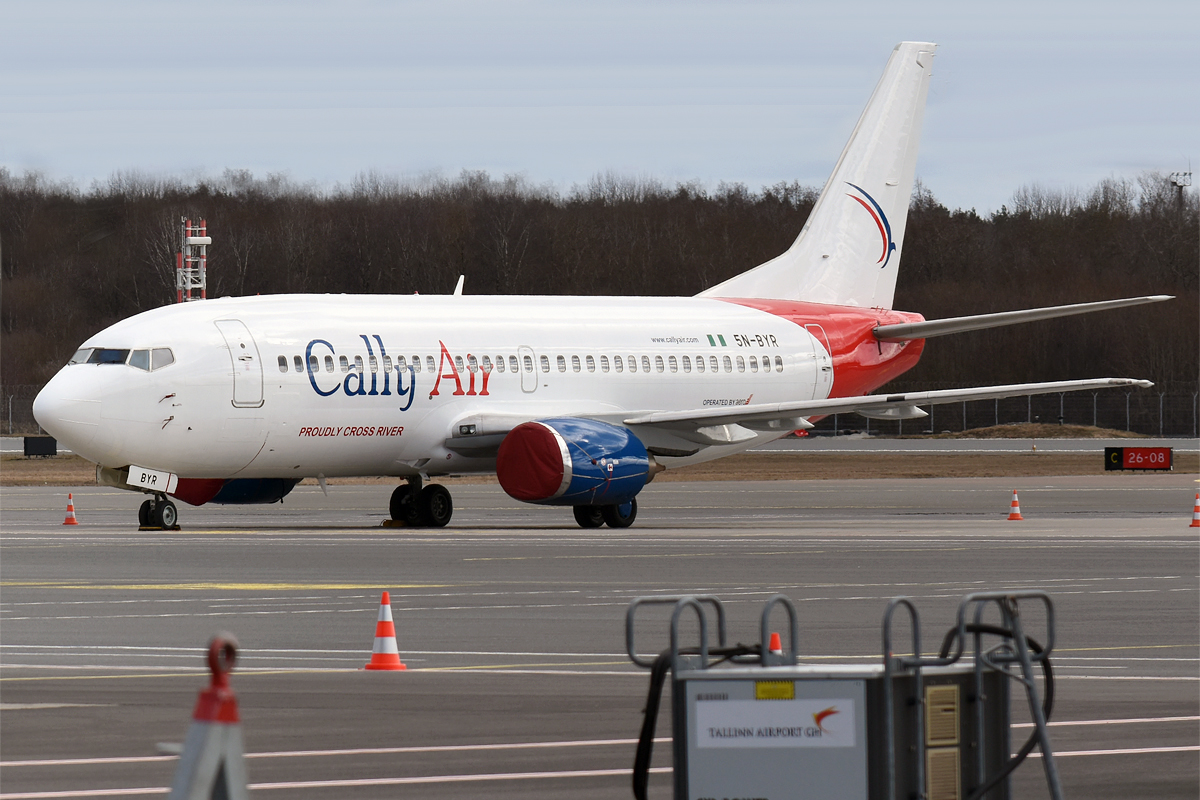
- 737 of Cally Air
IATA	ICAO	Call sign
—	—	CALLY
- Founded: 2017
- Commenced operations: 2021
- Hubs: Margaret Ekpo International Airport
- Focus cities: Calabar (hub), Lagos, Abuja
- Alliance: Aero-Cally
- Fleet size: 4
- Website: Cally Air Nigeria

Cally Air is a Nigerian airline owned by the Cross River State Government. The flights of the airline are operated by Aero Contractors.

== History ==
The airline commenced operations on 16 July 2021, when a Boeing 737 aircraft was welcomed on touchdown by Benedict Ayade, the then Governor of Cross River State, who boarded the aircraft for inspection and lauded the event as the realization of a dream that had started in 2017.

== Description ==
Cally Air has its hub at the Margaret Ekpo International Airport Calabar although most flights are conducted out of Murtala Muhammed International Airport in Lagos. The airline has two Boeing 737-300 and in May 2025 added two CRJ 1000 aircraft. Cally Air flights are operated by Aero Contractors and in July 2025 will also be operated by Valuejet Airlines out of their Lagos home base. Aero Contractors uses the aircraft of Cally Air for its own domestic operations. This is because Cally Air does not have an Air Operator's Certificate. In June 2025, Cally Air hired a new management team to commence its AOC process and will operate its two CRJ 1000 aircraft under Valuejet during the period of its AOC process.

== Destinations ==
As of May 2024, Cally Air flies to the following destinations in Nigeria.

Country	City	Airport	Notes
Nigeria	Abuja	Nnamdi Azikiwe International Airport	
Nigeria	Calabar	Margaret Ekpo International Airport	Hub
Nigeria	Lagos	Murtala Muhammed International Airport	

== Fleet ==
As of June 2025, Cally Air has the following fleet.

Aircraft	In fleet	Orders	Notes
Boeing 737-300	2		Operated by Aero Contractors
Bombardier CRJ 1000	2		Operated by Valuejet Airline

== Accidents and incidents ==
On 12 November 2023, a Cally Air Boeing 737 aircraft registered as 5N-BYQ skidded off the runway while landing at the Nnamdi Azikiwe International Airport in Abuja. The aircraft, which had arrived from Lagos and was operated by Aero Contractors (Nigeria), became stuck with its nose gear in soft ground. There were no reports of serious injuries.

This incident caused significant disruption at the airport. The runway was closed for several hours while the aircraft was removed, leading to flight delays, diversions, and cancellations. The Nigerian Safety Investigation Bureau launched an investigation into the cause of the accident.

== See also ==
- Ibom Air
- Aero Contractors (Nigeria)
- ValueJet (Nigeria)
