= Victor Attah International Airport =

Airport serving Uyo, Nigeria

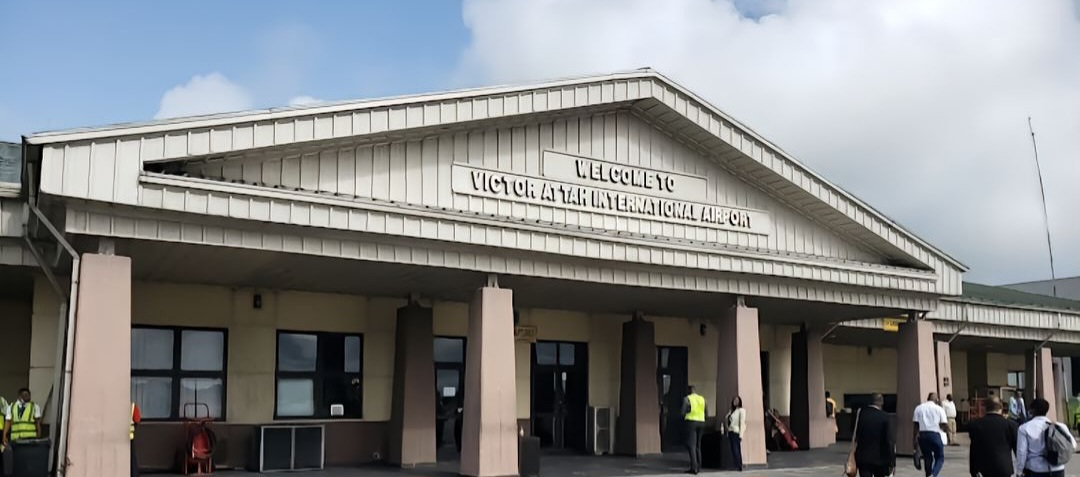
- IATA: QUO; ICAO: DNAI

Summary
- Airport type: Public
- Owner: Akwa Ibom State
- Operator: Ibom Airport Development Company Limited IADCL
- Serves: Uyo, Oron
- Location: Uyo, Nigeria
- Time zone: WAT (UTC+01:00)
- Elevation AMSL: 51 m (167 ft)
- Coordinates: 4°52′25″N 8°05′40″E
- Website: www.vaiairport.com

Map
- Location of airport in Nigeria

Runways
| Direction | Length | | Surface |
| Direction | m | ft | Surface |
|---|---|---|---|
| 03/21 | 3,600 | 11,811 | Asphalt |
- Sources: GCM Google Maps

Victor Attah International Airport (IATA: QUO, ICAO: DNAI), is an airport serving Uyo, the capital city of Akwa Ibom State in Nigeria. The airport is 24 kilometres (15 miles) Southeast of Uyo, and 16 kilometres (9.9 miles) northwest of the river port of Oron.

The Akwa Ibom non-directional beacon (Ident: AI) and Uyo VOR-DME (Ident: AKW) are located on the field.

The first phase of airport construction began in 2006 and was completed in the year 2009. Akwa Ibom Airport opened on 23 September 2009, and the first scheduled passenger service commenced on 2 December 2009, when Arik Air began offering flights to Abuja and Lagos. The second construction phase began in May 2012, and included the completion of a maintenance, repair, and overhaul facility, the construction of an international terminal, and additional taxiways.

The airport was renamed after former Governor Obong Victor Attah by Governor Udom Emmanuel at a Banquet to honor the 80th birthday of Obong Attah on 24 November 2018, the airport which was previously named Akwa Ibom International Airport has now been renamed to Victor Attah International Airport.

On May 2026, the airport would inaugurate its first international flight where it would depart from here to arrive at Kotoka International Airport at Accra, Ghana.

== Airlines and destinations ==
| Airlines | Destinations |
|---|---|
| Ibom Air | Abuja, Accra, Calabar, Enugu, Lagos, Port Harcourt |

The airport also serves as the hub for CRJ-900 operator, Ibom Air. Ibom Air is a state-owned carrier based at Victor Attah International Airport. The carrier operates regional services to destinations in Africa, using CRJ900 aircraft. The airline is wholly owned and operated by Akwa Ibom State Government. Ibom Air launched its maiden flight on 7 June 2019. The event was graced by the deputy governor, Moses Ekpo in company of other Akwa Ibomites. A Bombardier CRJ 900 Series with registration number 5N-BWM took off by 12pm for the Murtala Muhammed International Airport, Lagos. Ibom Air took delivery of its first set of aircraft in the form of two Bombardier CRJ-900s. The Akwa Ibom State Government took delivery of the fourth aircraft in the fleet of Ibom Air on 19 May 2020. The Airline then took over two Airbus A220-300s from Air Sinai with an order for ten more to be delivered directly from Airbus. Ibom Air now has seven aircraft in its fleet.

== Infrastructure ==
=== MRO ===
Akwa Ibom International Airport has a constructed Maintenance, Repair and Overhaul facility capable of handling aircraft maintenance and overhauling heavy commercial aircraft. The facility can conduct the A, B, C and D check. The facility, specifically designed for the Boeing 747, can accommodate two Boeing 747-400 parked juxtaposed, nose-in, fully contained within the building. The facility equipment, arrangement, clearance and supporting workshops allow flexibility for servicing a wide range of commercial aircraft.

=== Runways ===
The airport has a 3.6 km runway with designation 03/21.

| Number | Length | Width | ILS | Notes |
|---|---|---|---|---|
| 03/21 | 3600 m (11811 ft) | 60 m (197 ft) | Cat.II | The runway is made of asphalt |

=== Operational facilities ===
The airport has a category 9 aircraft rescue and fire-fighting facility, a category II instrument landing system, an air traffic control tower, a technical and administrative building, an emergency operating centre, an aviation fuel farm, a health clinic, police station, perimeter roads and fencing.

=== Future expansion and plans ===
Akwa Ibom International Airport has expansion plans. There are plans to build a cargo terminal with an accompanying apron, a permanent international passenger terminal building, a 3 to 5-star airport hotel capable of handling 2 simultaneous cancelled flights and pilgrims destined for Jerusalem, an aviation training college and other aviation facilities. The permanent terminal will feature facilities for flexible dual use, such that it will serve both domestic and international flights. It will have arrival and departure halls for domestic and international flights with the routes split, which will be efficient for both passenger and baggage movement. While departing passengers arrive at an elevated forecourt and move down a ramp to a boarding aircraft, arriving passengers move downwards to baggage reclaim facilities.

The Federal Government of Nigeria officially granted Victor Attah International Airport full approval for international flight operations on 27 November 2025. The approval was secured by Governor Umo Eno during a meeting with the Minister of Aviation and Aerospace Development, Festus Keyamo, who stated that the airport's existing facilities, including its modern MRO and a runway of over three kilometres, already meet the standard for international status. This designation elevates the airport into the class of Nigerian airports authorized for international traffic, enabling it to receive and process international airlines and serve as a direct gateway linking Akwa Ibom to global destinations.

Full international operations are expected to commence in the first quarter of 2026.

== Terminals ==
=== Terminal 1 ===
Terminal 1 opened in September 2009 to cater to flights at the airport. The terminal has check-in facilities and a ticketing section for departing passengers. It is also equipped with full body scanners and a departure lounge; departing passengers at the lounge can relax at the light restaurant until boarding is announced. The terminal has a baggage reclaim facility for arriving passengers. Passport control and customs are only available for international flights. The terminal serves Arik Air, Aero Contractors, Dana Air, Air Peace and charter airlines such as Sky Airlines, Atlasjet Airlines flying to Tel Aviv.

=== Terminal 2 ===
Terminal 2 opened in 2026 and serves flights outside of Nigeria. It is a smart facility designed to handle 1 million passengers and is designed to bring domestic and international operations in a single roof. The terminal uses facial recognition, video analytics and queue detection systems for security and protection. The terminal uses an HVAC climate control system for stable indoor conditions and motion-detected lighting to manage energy use. The terminal uses multiple generator to ensure uninterrupted operations.

On 14 June 2026, terminal 2 is also announced to be used for Ibom Air flights.

== See also ==
- Transport in Nigeria
- List of airports in Nigeria
