= Aloysius Chidozie Ogbonna =

Igbo monarch

- Ubojene II; Akajiofo Ntu-egbenese
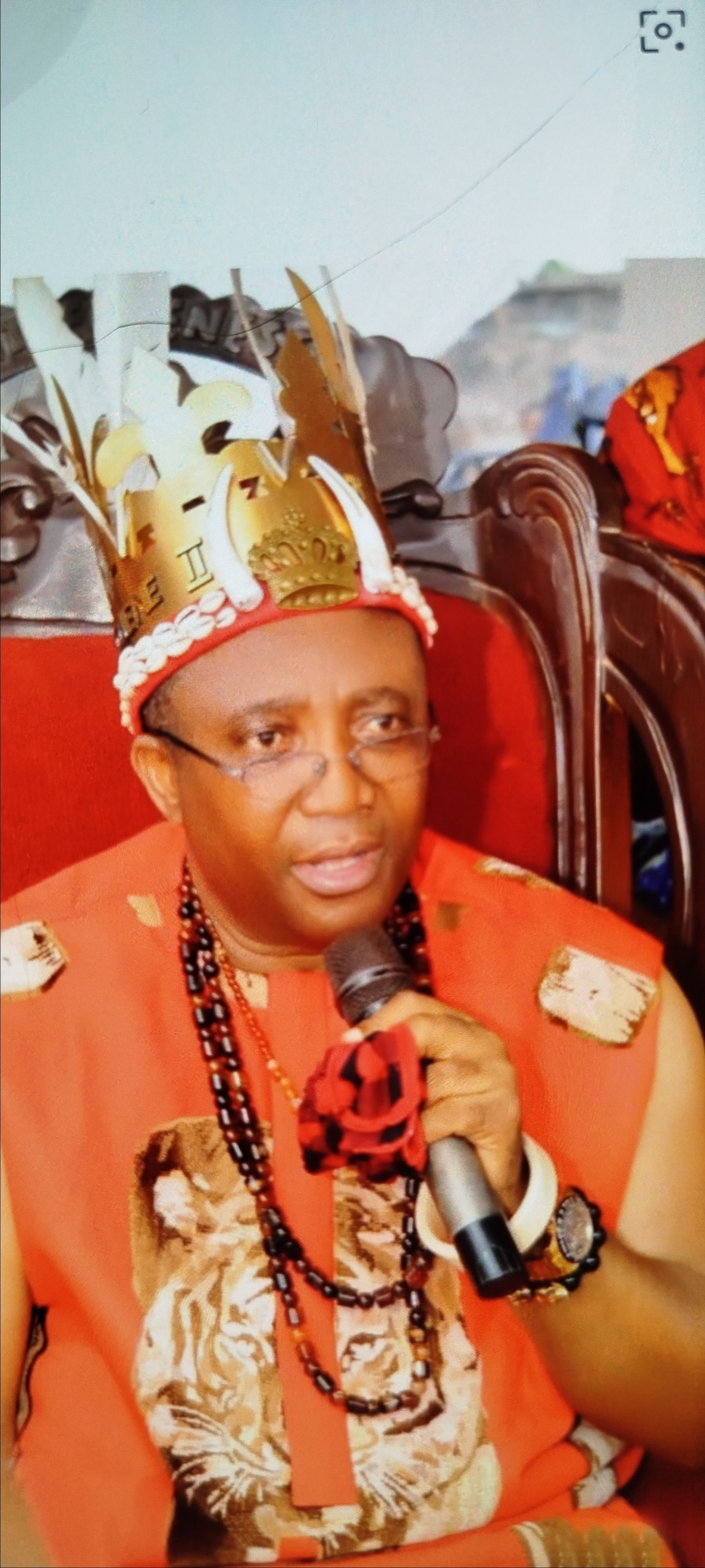
- Reign: 14 January 2024 - present
- Coronation: 24 April 2025
- Predecessor: Igwe Godwin Ochi
- Born: 19 December 1968 (age 57)
- Spouse: Princess Adaeze Chizoba Ogbonna (Nee Obi)
- Issue: Prince Raleke Chukwubuikem Ogbonna; Princess Chinazo Alicia Ogbonna; Princess Kamsiyo Chioma Ogbonna

Aloysius Chidozie Ogbonna (born December 19, 1968) is an Igbo monarch and the current traditional ruler of Ogugu, Ntu-egbenese Ancient Kingdom in Awgu, Enugu State. Ogbonna ascended the throne after 25 years of vacancy following the death of Godwin Ochi in 1999.

== Early life and education ==
Ogbonna was born on December 19, 1968, in Ogugu, Enugu State. He attended Ogugu Central School from 1973 to 1979. He then attended Government Secondary School Tangaza, Sokoto State, earning his senior secondary certificate in 1984. He later earned a Bachelor's degree in Mass Communication from the Enugu State University of Science and Technology in 1994. Earlier, he served as President of Awgu Local Government Students in the University from 1992 to 1994. He was also the Director of Social in 1993. In 1994, he was elected as the Student Union President at the Enugu State University of Technology.

== Career ==
Ogbonna left Nigeria for South Africa in the mid-90s, where he founded Eagles Watch Security and Cleaning Services CC, reportedly the "first black foreign African-owned security company" in Pretoria. He also founded Divine Watch Security and Cleaning Services and OGB Logistics CC. He served as President of all Nigerians in Eastern Cape, South Africa from 2001 to 2004 and President of the Nigerian Union East London from 2007 to 2009.

== Election and coronation ==
He was elected Ìgwè of Ogugu Ntu-egbenese Ancient Kingdom on January 14, 2024. He was coronated on April 24, 2025, as Ubaojene II of Ogugu Ntu-egbenese at Nkwo-Ogugu. In April 2025, Enugu Government led by Peter Mbah presented him a certificate of recognition. Ogbonna promotes sports, and he is a fan of Rangers International FC. Since becoming monarch, Igwe Ogbonna makes his opinions known on several social issues. He is also vocal on leadership quality.

== Personal life ==
Ogbonna is married to Princess Adaeze Chizoba Ogbonna from the royal Obi Uruagu family of Nnewi. They have three children.
