= Dana Air Flight 0992 =

2012 passenger plane crash in Lagos, Nigeria

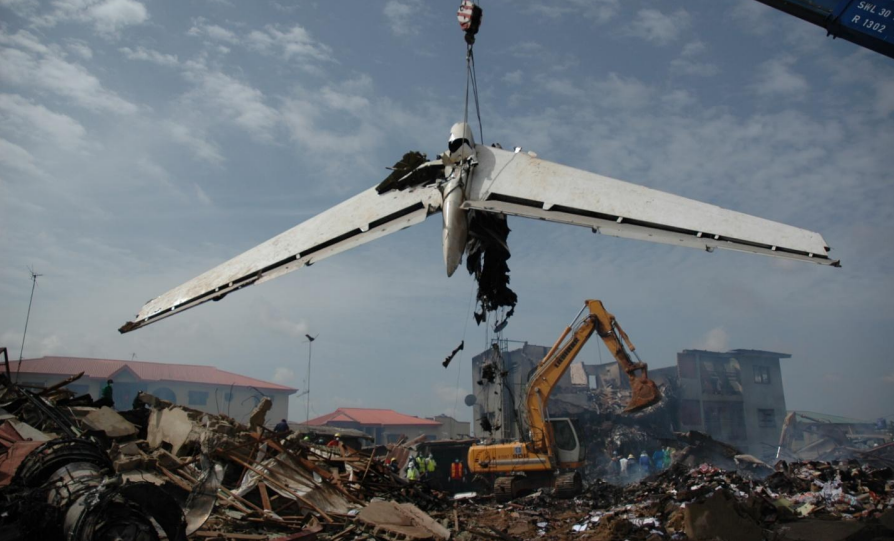
- The remaining tail section of the aircraft being removed from the crash site

Accident
- Date: 3 June 2012
- Summary: Crashed on approach following dual-engine failure, pilot error, and lack of situational awareness
- Site: Iju-Ishaga, near Murtala Muhammed International Airport, Lagos, Nigeria; 06°40′19″N 03°18′50″E
- Total fatalities: 159

Aircraft
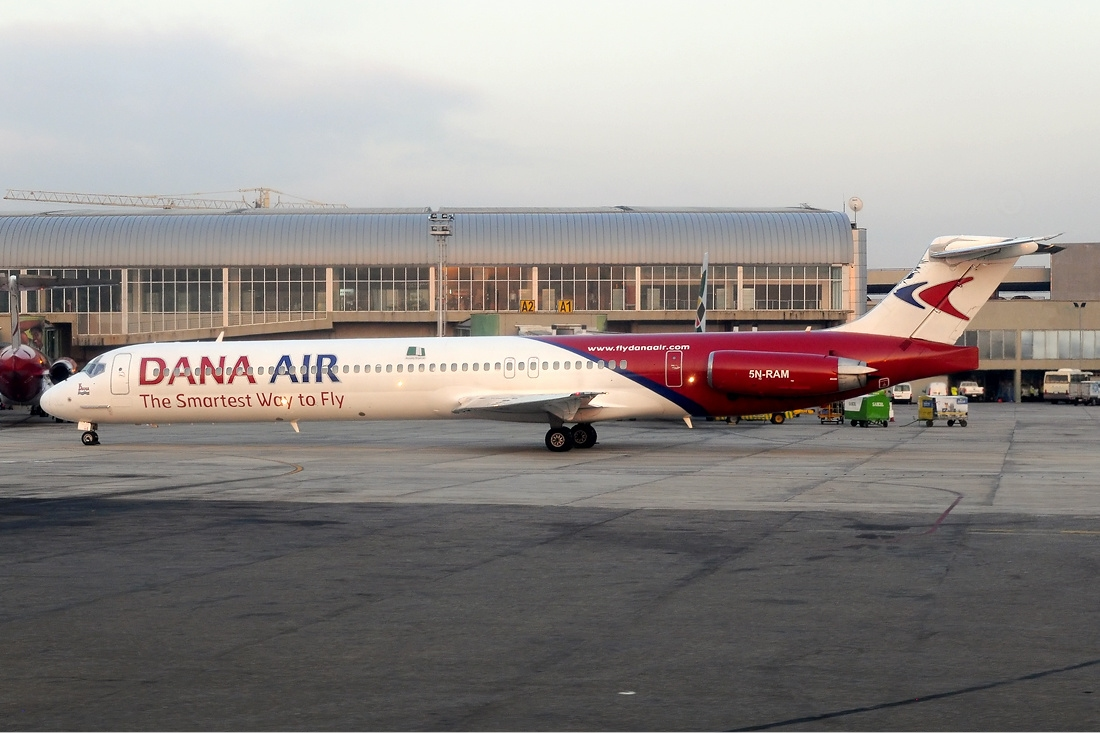
- 5N-RAM, the aircraft involved in the accident, at Lagos Airport in 2009 with a previous livery
- Aircraft type: McDonnell Douglas MD-83
- Operator: Dana Air
- IATA flight No.: 9J0992
- ICAO flight No.: DAN0992
- Call sign: DANACO 0992
- Registration: 5N-RAM
- Flight origin: Nnamdi Azikiwe International Airport, Abuja, Nigeria
- Destination: Murtala Muhammed International Airport, Lagos, Nigeria
- Occupants: 153
- Passengers: 147
- Crew: 6
- Fatalities: 153
- Survivors: 0

Ground casualties
- Ground fatalities: 6

Dana Air Flight 0992 was a scheduled Nigerian domestic passenger flight from Nnamdi Azikiwe International Airport to Murtala Muhammed International Airport. On 3 June 2012, the McDonnell Douglas MD-80 aircraft crashed following a dual-engine failure, killing all 153 people on board and six on the ground. It remains the deadliest commercial airliner crash in Nigeria since the 1973 Kano air disaster.

Accident Investigation Bureau (AIB; now called Nigerian Accident Investigation Bureau) concluded that both of the aircraft's engines had lost power during its approach to Lagos. Incorrect assembly had severed the engines' fuel line, causing fuel to not be delivered to both engines. During the initial sequence of the engine failure, the pilots opted not to declare an emergency until the second engine lost power during the flight's final approach. Lack of situational awareness and poor decision-making by the pilots eventually caused the aircraft to crash into buildings.

The crash was the fifth major Nigerian aviation disaster in a decade, after EAS Airlines Flight 4226 in 2002, Bellview Airlines Flight 210 and Sosoliso Airlines Flight 1145 in 2005, and ADC Airlines Flight 053 in 2006. Consequently, it led to a major overhaul of the nation's aviation sector. Since the crash of Flight 0992, Nigeria's aviation safety improved significantly and the country eventually retained the category 1 status of its aviation safety.

== Background ==
=== Aircraft ===
The aircraft was a twin-engined McDonnell Douglas MD-83, registered in Nigeria as 5N-RAM, built in 1990 and first delivered to Alaska Airlines under the registration of N944AS, and operated until the airline retired their MD-80s in 2008. It was then stored at Southern California Logistics Airport before being acquired by Dana Air in February 2009. The airframe had accumulated more than 60,800 hours of total flight time since new. The aircraft engines had over 55,300 and 26,000 hours of total flight time before the crash. The last maintenance on the aircraft was performed on 2 June 2012, exactly a day before the accident.

=== Passengers and crew ===
==== Passengers ====
People on board by nationality
Nationality	Passengers	Crew	Ground	Total
Nigeria	134	3	6	143
China	6	0	0	6
United States	2	1	0	3
India	1	1	0	2
Benin	1	0	0	1
Canada	1	0	0	1
France	1	0	0	1
Germany	1	0	0	1
Indonesia	0	1	0	1
Lebanon	1	0	0	1
Total	147	6	6	159

Flight 0992 was carrying 147 passengers, including 15 foreign nationals from 9 countries. The foreigners were six Chinese nationals, three Americans, two Indians, and one each from Benin, Canada, Germany, France, Indonesia, and Lebanon.

Among those on board were Celestine Onwuliri, husband of then-Nigerian Foreign Minister Viola Onwuliri, Ehime Aikhomu, son of late Nigerian admiral and former Nigerian Vice President Augustus Aikhomu, Ibrahim Damcida, former Permanent Secretary of the Nigerian Ministry of Finance, Levi Chibuike Ajuonuma, then-spokesperson of Nigerian National Petroleum Corporation, and Shehu Sa’ad, Director of major Nigerian bank Mainstreet Bank Limited. Local media reported that several senior military officials were also on the flight.

==== Crew ====
The aircraft was carrying 6 crew members, including an American captain, an Indian First Officer, an Indonesian flight engineer and three Nigerian flight attendants.

The captain was 55-year-old Peter Waxton. He had 18,116 total flight hours, with 7,466 hours on the MD-83. He was a captain for Spirit Airlines from 1997 to 2009. He also was reported to have flown for Falcon Air Express, a charter airline in Miami. The captain was hired by Dana Air on 14 March 2012. He began flying line training operations under the supervision of a training captain on 26 April 2012 after completing ground school and simulator training. He held several ratings, including Airbus A320, McDonnell Douglas DC-9, Fokker F-27, and Saab 340. His license had previously been suspended by the Federal Aviation Administration (FAA) due to multiple hard landings and failing to report maintenance issues. He received a new license in August 2011.

The first officer, Mahendra Singh Rathore, was a 34-year-old with 1,143 flight hours, including 808 hours on the MD-83. He was previously employed at Dana Air as the director of cabin service before he was hired as a pilot in January 2011.

== Accident ==
Flight 0992 was a flight from the Nigerian capital of Abuja to the country's largest city of Lagos, operated with a McDonnell Douglas MD-83. It departed Abuja at 14:58 local time with 147 passengers and 6 crew members, and 26,000 lb (12,000 kg) of fuel. The wind was calm and the weather conditions were good. The flight was piloted by Captain Peter Waxton and First Officer Mahendra Singh Rathore, with Rathore as the pilot flying. The aircraft was on the returning leg of the second flight from Abuja.

=== First engine malfunction ===
Approximately 17 minutes after taking off from Abuja, the crew noticed an abnormality with the left engine. The engine was not producing enough thrust despite the manually input throttle setting. Rathore asked Waxton if he should call the engineer to analyze the problem, but Waxton declined, stating that they could determine the cause of the problem themselves. Waxton then asked Rathore if one of the ground crews had tampered with the panel near the aircraft's rear door, and subsequently stated that "the guy" was angry at them. Prior to the flight's departure, the pilots had been in a dispute with the ground crew involving the use of the rear passenger exit door.

The crew decided to continue the flight to Lagos even though there were differences in the EPR value on the engines and the lack of response from the left engine, which was operating at idle power despite its throttle setting. They then contacted Lagos ATC to request a descent clearance. During the entire conversation, there was no mention of the inoperative left engine, and they did not follow the emergency checklist for an inoperative engine.

As the flight was cleared to descend, Captain Waxton ordered First Officer Rathore to increase the aircraft's rate of descent, but First Officer Rathore declined, stating that the gradual descent was far more effective in maintaining their altitude. Flight 0992 was then cleared by Lagos for an approach to Runway 18L. Again, the crew didn't issue a distress call or even mention the malfunctioning left engine. The flight continued to approach Lagos. As it was confirmed that there was no response from the left engine, Captain Waxton took over the control from First Officer Rathore and became the pilot flying. The right engine, at the time, was still operative and thus the crew thought that it was still safe to continue the flight to Lagos. Captain Waxton could be heard saying "Okay, this one is good for us so far."

=== Second engine malfunction ===
As the aircraft got closer to Lagos, the crew became increasingly concerned as they started to receive a series of heading and altitude radar vectors from Lagos ATC. They shifted through multiple checklists for the approach to Lagos. However, they didn't read the single-engine landing checklist that had been provided for them. Their altitude was a bit higher than usual at the time and Captain Waxton decided to increase the rate of descent to correct it. He then asked First Officer Rathore to configure the aircraft for the landing by setting the flaps to 15. That way, the aircraft would generate lift with minimal drag. However, even though he had decided to configure the aircraft for landing, additional thrust was still required for the final approach to Lagos. The crew were in a difficult situation.

Captain Waxton then tried to decrease the rate of descent by increasing the throttle setting of the right engine. To his surprise, the right engine didn't respond to his input. Both engines finally had completely failed to generate the commanded thrust. Realizing the gravity of the situation, the crew finally declared an emergency when they were 11 nautical miles (20 km) from the airport.

15:42:01	Flight 0992	Lagos Tower, Danaco zero niner niner two.
15:42:05	Lagos ATC	Danaco zero niner niner two this is Lagos.. uh.. Radar. Go.
15:42:10	Flight 0992	Mayday Mayday Mayday, Danaco zero niner niner two, Five November Romeo Alpha Mike, dual engine failure.
15:42:16	Lagos ATC	Danaco zero niner niner two, how do you read?
15:42:18	Flight 0992	I read you five by five, dual engine failure, negative response from throttle, requesting direct approach. Danaco zero niner niner two.
15:42:27	Lagos ATC	position is one zero miles to touchdown one eight right, contact tower now one one eight one.
15:42:32	Flight 0992	one one eight one good day.

However, even with the present emergency, the crew still failed to review the checklist for such a situation. They immediately attempted to contact control tower at 118.1 MHz for landing directions but were unsuccessful. The flaps were then set to 28 and Captain Waxton asked the flight purser to prepare for landing. At the time, there was no indication that the situation was not under control.

A few minutes later, the "altitude" warning sounded, and Captain Waxton stated that he had sighted the runway. The flaps were selected up and the crew selected the landing gears up. As both engines had lost their ability to generate the commanded thrust, Captain Waxton concluded that "we just lost everything, we lost an engine, I lost both engines". During the next 25 seconds, the captain requested everything that could help recover thrust including "relight", "ignition override", "just anything" to be given to him. With the lack of thrust output from the engines, the aircraft continued to lose its speed and altitude.

=== Crash ===
The aircraft lost its thrust power and descended closer to the ground. The crew then applied stabilizer trim several times as they tried to avoid obstacles and buildings ahead of them, but they failed to arrest the descent. The aircraft lost altitude rapidly and the altitude warning sounded until the end of the recording.

The MD-83 crashed in the densely-populated Iju-Ishaga neighbourhood near the airport. It first impacted a two-storey Power Holding Company of Nigeria building with its right wing and later struck multiple trees and three other buildings. The aircraft then exploded and burst into flames. Fire then spread throughout the neighbourhood. One of the impacted buildings was an uncompleted building that had been storing flammable liquids in preparation for its intended use as a press building, increasing the fire. Many residents initially mistook the explosion that had been caused by the crash as an attack by Nigerian terrorist group Boko Haram.

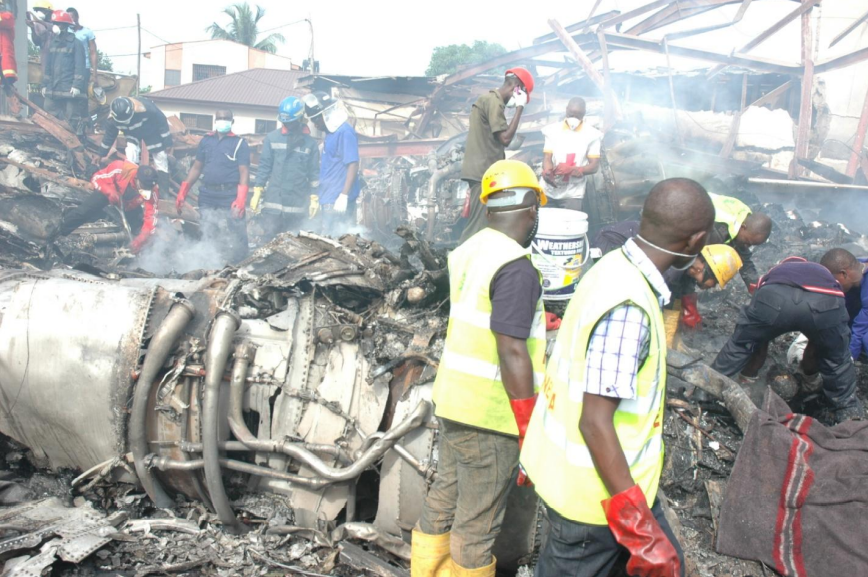
Crash site of Dana Air Flight 0992 in Iju-Ishaga neighbourhood

The crash scene became chaotic, with Nigeria's The Sun reporting that thousands of Lagos residents attempted to approach the site. Crowds attempted to bring water hoses to the site while soldiers attempted to disperse onlookers with punches and rubber whips. The onlookers then threw stones at the soldiers in retaliation. Water for firefighting was scarce for several hours due to the city's shortage of fire trucks, and civilians attempted to fight the fire by hand with water from plastic buckets. Water trucks commandeered from nearby construction projects had difficulties reaching the site due to the narrow roads.

Due to these challenges, the dousing of the flames by the authorities was delayed, and consequently the fire completely destroyed every structure of the aircraft, bar the tail. No survivors were found at the crash site, with all 153 passengers and crew members perishing. At least 6 people on the ground were also killed by the crash. Forensic analysis eventually revealed that 27 people on board the aircraft, all of whom were seated at the back, had initially survived the crash. Some residents reported that the survivors had tried to escape from the burning wreckage, with locals attempting to open the emergency exit to rescue them; however, they succumbed to the smoke and the ensuing explosions.

== Response ==
High-ranking officials, including then-Nigerian President Goodluck Jonathan and Governor of Lagos State Babatunde Fashola, visited the crash site on 4 June. Following the visit, President Jonathan declared three days of national mourning. He noted that the accident had "sadly plunged the nation into further sorrow on a day when Nigerians were already in grief over the loss of many other innocent lives in the church bombing in Bauchi State", which happened just mere hours before the crash.

In response to the accident, President Jonathan pledged that "every possible effort" would be made to boost the nation's aviation safety, echoing the remarks of previous Nigerian President Olusegun Obasanjo during a string of aircraft disasters in 2005 and 2006. The federal government suspended Dana Air's license and also banned the MD-83 aircraft type after the crash. They also set up a nine-man technical and administrative panel to audit all airlines operating in the country. On 5 September 2012, the suspension on Dana Air's operating license was lifted, and the airline started recertification and retraining processes.

Dana Air set up a 24-hour hotline for relatives to call and added a message to its website reading, "Our thoughts and prayers are with the families of guests who were involved in the Dana Air mishap. May the souls of the deceased rest in peace". Management of Dana Air stated that the relatives of each of the passengers would be given compensation of US$100,000.

Rescuers managed to recover at least 152 bodies, including partially-recovered ones, and most had been severely charred by the post-crash fire. A total of 148 bodies were successfully identified, consisting of 89 males and 59 females. The report from the chief medical examiner, however, stated that authorities were unable to identify 3 remaining "bodies". Of the 148 identified bodies, a total of 9 victims were not on the manifest. The bodies of Captain Waxton and First Officer Rathore could not be identified. Governor Fashola of Lagos State held a press conference on 10 June with the families of the victims regarding the government's plan to hold a mass burial for the victims of Flight 0992. The plan was eventually rejected by the relatives.

In light of the crash, the Nigerian Senate asked President Jonathan to remove the Director-General of Nigerian Civil Aviation Authority (NCAA), Harold Demuren, from his position. The Nigerian House of Representatives accused the NCAA of being inept, claiming that the MD-83 aircraft type had been phased out in every country around the world and further alleged that NCAA had not been able to provide a qualified inspector for the type. The report was called by NCAA officials as "falsehood, fallacies and misrepresentation". It led to a controversy between government officials and NCAA as the calls to remove Demuren from his position were regarded as an attempt by corrupted officials to gang-up the head of the regulatory agency. Former Nigerian President Olusegun Obasanjo made pleas to President Jonathan to let Demuren stay. Despite his achievements for the Nigerian aviation safety sector in the past years, Demuren was eventually removed by Minister of Aviation Stella Oduah from his position in March 2013 due to his perceived ineptitude on the investigation of Flight 0992's crash.

Apart from the senate investigation, a coroner's inquest into the crash was also held. During the inquest, a member of the Nigerian Airspace Management Agency (NAMA) accused the agency's emergency response team of failing to act properly. NAMA had released a transcript of the communication between the crew of Flight 0992 and Lagos ATC and the member argued that authorities should have declared an emergency immediately after the pilots had reported that there was something wrong with the aircraft. The inquest further revealed that the search and rescue operation was uncoordinated and had been executed in a haphazard manner.

== Investigation ==
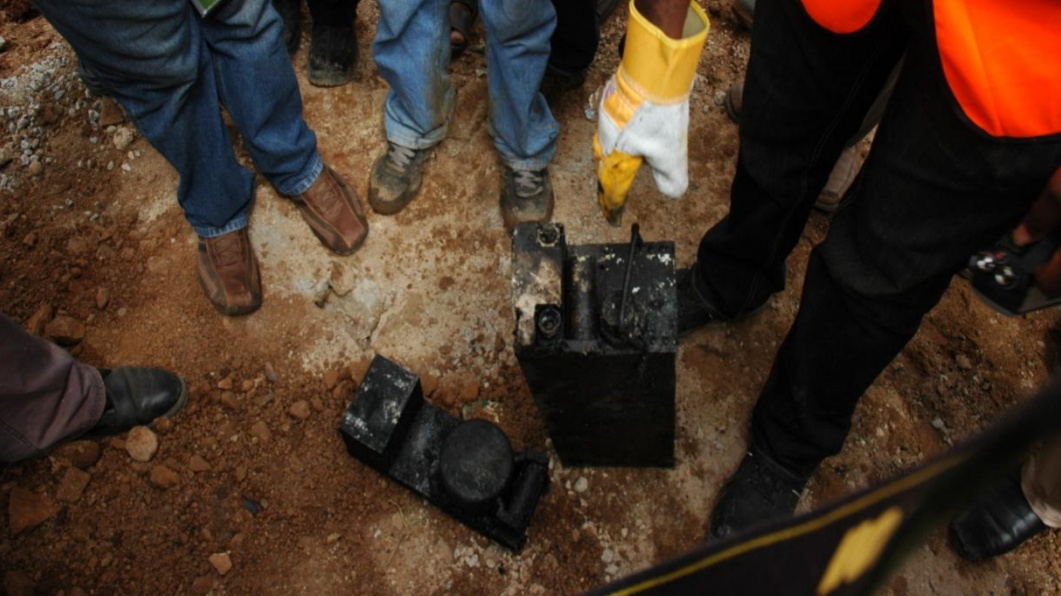
Recovered flight recorders of 5N-RAM

Because the aircraft was American-made, the United States National Transportation Safety Board (NTSB) had observer status for the investigation. United States Federal Aviation Administration, Boeing and Pratt & Whitney Canada also sent their representatives to assist the investigators.

Both the cockpit voice recorder (CVR) and flight data recorder (FDR) were recovered from the crash site on 4 June in charred condition. The damage of the post-crash fire to the FDR was so severe that the digital tape of the recorder melted. Thus, the recorder failed to yield any information. However, the CVR memory card was still in good condition, despite its severely burnt casing. Nearly 31 minutes of conversation were recovered from the CVR.

One day after the crash, a top official from the Nigerian Aerospace Management Agency (NAMA) accused Dana Air of being ignorant even though the airline was aware that the crashed aircraft was not safe enough for passenger service. She alleged that the owner of Dana Air had prior knowledge of the aircraft being faulty yet the owner decided to "throw caution to the wind" and keep the aircraft in passenger service. Two other officials from NAMA further supported the claim, stating that Dana Air should be charged with murder as the crashed aircraft had history of multiple problems. Asked for confirmation on the claims, NAMA decided to deny the reports, stating that "it is not our responsibility to do so".

=== Engine failure ===
The crew of Flight 0992 had reported dual-engine failure just minutes before it crashed onto the packed residential area of Iju-Ishaga. Crash site inspection confirmed that both engines had not generated much power as the observed damage was consistent with low-to-no RPM at the time of impact. Further examination was therefore needed to confirm the source of the failure. As the engines were overhauled by the Miami-based Millenium Engine Associates Inc, both engines were sent to the United States for a teardown.

During the teardown of both engines, investigators discovered several fractures in the fuel lines of the left engine. The fuel feeder lines had fractured flush, exhibiting shear lips. The primary fuel manifold had bent downwards. The secondary fuel manifold had twisted. Its fuel transfer tube had nearly blocked the flow of the fuel, reducing the diameter of the fuel nozzle. On the right engine, the secondary fuel manifold had collapsed and there were fractures on the primary fuel manifold. The fuel lines of both engines had also fractured and bent on its fittings, the No.5 and No.6 fittings.

The AIB wanted a closer examination on the engines. Subsequently, the engines were shipped back to Lagos but Millenium only sent the left engine, while the right engine was not shipped back, for reasons unknown. As the AIB conducted tests on the left engine, metallurgical analysis on the manifolds revealed that both of the manifolds had been overstressed. Despite the findings, there was no evidence that the fracture had occurred prior to the crash. Combined with the absence of the right engine, the team hit a dead end. They eventually began to shift their attention towards the fuel pumps.

Investigators eventually discovered that there was a possibility of a microbial growth in the fuel supply. This was caused by the storage of the fuel, which was exposed to effects of the sun. This exposure might have caused the temperature of the fuel to rise to as high as 25 °C (77 °F). Added with the typically high humidity in the tropical climate setting, this eventually promoted fungal growth, which would have led to fuel tank corrosion, fuel filter and fuel pipe obstruction, and erratic indication of the fuel tank. The preliminary fuel sample analysis, however, didn't find any positive contamination of the fuel. Despite this, and due to the earlier findings of possible microbial contamination, investigators issued a recommendation for Dana Air to conduct a visual inspection for possible fuel contamination and to use biocidal treatment for the matter.

Apart from the fuel samples, there was also suspicion of a certain flying culture in Dana Air, which was called by the investigators as "peculiar fuel management". According to the investigation, the team discovered that there was a certain flying culture for every Dana Air MD-83 flight in which, during an aircraft's approach to its intended destination, the fuel in the centre fuel tank was almost entirely depleted, while the fuel tanks in the wings remained full. The fuel tanks in the wings were, somehow, not used at all by the pilots. Due to this finding, investigators issued another recommendation to Dana Air, which stated that a minimum of 2,000 pounds (910 kg) of fuel must be maintained in the centre fuel tank of the aircraft on landing at any destination. Though there was no evidence that fuel exhaustion was the cause of the crash [the recordings revealed that the crew had reported a total of 26,000 pounds (12,000 kg) of fuel on board], the investigation concerning this issue remained ongoing, eventually resulting in a major breakthrough.

=== Breakthrough ===
On 6 October 2013, Dana Air Flight 0348, an MD-83 flying from Port Harcourt to Lagos, registration 5N-SAI, reported troubles with the aircraft's engine during its climbing phase. The crew reported the exact same problem that the crew Flight 0992 had faced - an engine that was unresponsive with the commanded thrust. The pilot had noticed the abnormality during the previous leg, and thus, he asked the flight engineer to observe with him in the cockpit. During the climb, he noticed that the engine had suffered slow acceleration with it taking around 30 seconds to accelerate from idle power to about 60% rather than the usual 6 seconds.

Contrary to the action of Flight 0992, the crew of Flight 0348 reported the problem to the ATC and declared an emergency. The aircraft landed safely, and the engine was sent for a teardown. The engine of Flight 0348 had just been overhauled by the contractor on 11 April 2013. As the engines of 5N-RAM and 5N-SAI had been overhauled by the same company, the Millenium Engine Associates Inc (now renamed as Global Engine Maintenance LCC), the engine was shipped to Miami for further examination.

The results from the teardown revealed that the engine of 5N-SAI (Flight 0348) had suffered the exact same damage as the engines of 5N-RAM (Flight 0992). The malfunctioning engine of the aircraft, the right engine, had suffered fractures on its fuel manifold. The said manifold had fractured on the secondary inlet tube, causing the tube to be separated from its fuel nozzle. The resulting fuel leak could be seen from the engine's fan, and the engine was also not responsive to the commanded thrust.

The AIB discovered that the fuel manifold had been improperly installed by Millenium. The protective fairings of the tube had been installed in a way that was not in conformity with the correct standard that had been issued by Pratt & Whitney Canada, causing the fuel lines to be severed.

=== Faulty maintenance ===
Pratt & Whitney Canada was fully aware of the possibility of the secondary fuel manifold fractures. The fractures would have resulted in fuel leaks, causing significant problems for flights. In one instance, in 2001, there was a reported engine fire due to the issue. As such, Pratt & Whitney issued a service bulletin to fix the problem. In October 2003, Pratt & Whitney addressed all operators to replace or modify the secondary fuel manifold with new tube material. The new tube would have reduced the occurrence of fractures due to the significantly greater fatigue life.

According to the history of the aircraft's engine, the right engine had been overhauled in accordance with the bulletin by Volvo Flygmotor in 2005. At the time, the engine was still in operation with Alaska Airlines. The left engine, however, was not overhauled. It was sold to Dana Air in its original condition. The left engine was eventually overhauled by Millenium Engine Associates Inc in August 2011. The right engine was eventually overhauled by Millenium as well in September 2011. Both of the overhauls, however, were not carried out in accordance with the bulletin. The company also installed the manifold incorrectly, putting more bending stress on the secondary manifold inlet tubes.

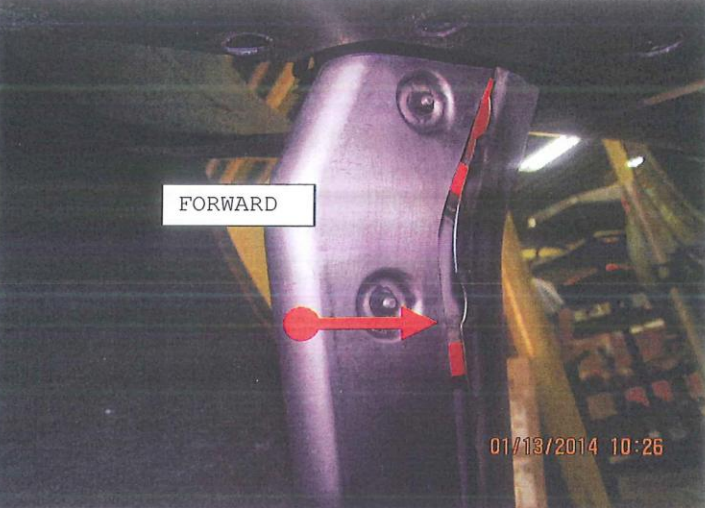
Loose fitting caused by improper installation. The jutted out area eventually caught bypassing hot air.

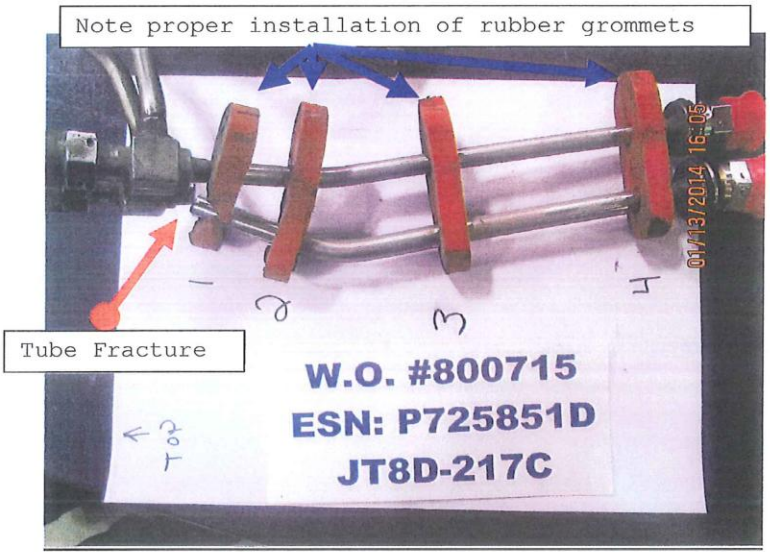
The inlet tube without its protective fitting. Complete separation of the tube from its connection point could be seen.

The installation of the fairing, a part of the manifold, was also not in accordance with the correct procedure. Due to the procedure, the fairing was not sealed tightly. The loose fairing remained open to the side. Following the combustion of fuel, the engine created hot air. The loose fairing then caught the bypassing air and acted like a sail, creating significant drag. The fuel inlet tube was then pulled by the loose fairing. Combined with the bending stress that had been put upon by the improper installation of the fuel manifold, the unchanged tube material of the fuel manifold, and its exposure to hot air, the fuel inlet tube eventually cracked. The fuel lines inside the tube then collapsed, causing a significant drop in fuel flow and the subsequent slow acceleration of the aircraft's engines. Investigators however could not explain why the right engine had also suffered the exact same failure as the left engine, even though the engine overhaul had been carried out with the supposed procedure.

During the investigation, the pilot of Flight 0348 stated that there were other Dana Air aircraft that had suffered slow acceleration, all of which had been overhauled by Millenium. The finding prompted the Nigerian Civil Aviation Authority (NCAA) to immediately order every aircraft with engines installed by Millenium to be sent to an NCAA-approved engine shop. Until the issue was resolved, the aircraft involved would not be allowed to continue operation.

Flight simulations were conducted in the Pan Am International Flight Academy (PAIFA) to investigate whether the accident was preventable or not. After simulating every possible scenario in Flight 0992, all of the results indicated that the crash was not inevitable. It was evident that had the crew taken the appropriate decisions and measures during the emergency, the crash could have been avoided. Even in the worst-case scenario of a possible crash, the number of casualties on board could have been minimized. Despite the dual-engine failure emergency, the condition was actually still within limits for permitting safe operation of the aircraft.

=== Poor decision-making ===
It was evident that the actions of the crew had a significant impact on the crash of Flight 0992. Throughout the entire flight, the crew didn't adhere to the correct procedure for an engine failure. The checklist for an engine failure emergency was not used by the crew. Had they read the checklist, then the crew would have diverted the aircraft to the nearest airport in the area. There were at least three airports near Flight 0992; Ilorin, Ibadan and Abuja. Ibadan was actually listed in the checklist as an official alternative airport. Since the crew didn't read the checklist, all said airports were ignored.

The first engine failure occurred as early as 17 minutes into the flight. The flight from Abuja to Lagos typically takes a little over an hour. Thus, the crew had plenty of time to declare an emergency over the issue, but they delayed their emergency declaration until the failure of the second engine. They did not mention the occurrence of an engine failure to the ATC. The decision to not declare an emergency over the engine failure was possibly influenced by Captain Waxton's fear of being investigated by Nigerian authorities. In the CVR recording, he could be heard saying that if they declared an emergency, then the Nigerian authorities would investigate them. At one point, Captain Waxton asserted that the aircraft could not quit on them.

Recording analysis also revealed a steep cockpit-authority gradient between the flight crew. Captain Waxton was far more experienced on the MD-83 than First Officer Rathore. As such, First Officer Rathore became less assertive. During the descent to Lagos, First Officer Rathore stated that they should delay the descent. Captain Waxton overruled him and asked to descend. According to the AIB, had the pilots maintained a high altitude as suggested by First Officer Rathore, then the flight would have had a better chance of reaching Lagos.

As a result of the decision not to delay the descent, the aircraft was ultimately nearer to the ground than it would otherwise have been. The crew was consequently left in a difficult situation, as the final approach required additional thrust. The airspeed, however, kept decaying. Captain Waxton could be heard panicking, repeatedly stating that he "didn't want to stall the plane". Since they did not read the appropriate checklist for engine failure emergency, which would have outlined the correct procedures so that any kind of difficulties would have been minimized, the crew incorrectly configured the aircraft. They decided to extend the gear and flaps, further increasing drag, and reducing the aircraft's ability to maintain its airspeed. They eventually realized that their speed had dropped further, but by this point the aircraft was already too low.

=== Captain Waxton and Dana Air ===
Both flight crew members of Flight 0992 were of foreign origin. A comprehensive review on the recruitment process of both pilots was then conducted. The review eventually revealed several findings. While there was no peculiar notes or documents on First Officer Rathore, documents retrieved by the Nigerian AIB revealed that Captain Waxton's flying license had been suspended by the United States Federal Aviation Administration (FAA) in 2009 for misdemeanours related to a heavy landing and an unreported panel fix. The revalidated license issued to him by Nigerian Civil Aviation Authority (NCAA) was stamped but was not signed by any NCAA official.

The investigation also revealed that Waxton had been given comments by his pilot instructor to improve his performance. However, the AIB could not find any documents to show that Waxton had indeed improved his flying performance. There was also no documented evidence that Captain Waxton had followed the mandatory requirements for recruitment, including selection interview and background check. All of the findings indicated that Waxton had been hurriedly hired by Dana Air. The performance assessment also indicated that he had been hurriedly trained to immediately fly the MD-83, even though there were plenty of notes about Waxton's unsatisfactory performance.

Findings related to Captain Waxton's recruitment eventually led to more discovery on the corporate culture within Dana Air. The Quality Department of Nigeria's Dana Air had never been involved in the recruitment process of foreign pilots. Interviews by former pilots further revealed issues regarding the maintenance culture within Dana Air. According to the interviews, there was a habit for Dana Air crew to not enter flight defects into the technical logbook. Several of these malpractices had been conducted by senior Dana Air pilots. Most of the interviewees were pilots who had either been kicked out of the company or had decided to quit due to the issues.

The Nigerian Civil Aviation Authority, the regulatory body for Nigerian aviation safety, was supposed to oversee the operation of every airliner in Nigeria. The fact that there were malpractices inside the aviation industry proved that there was ineffective oversight on airliners in the country. The AIB eventually asked the NCAA to intensify the safety oversight of the country's aviation sector.

=== Final report ===
On 13 March 2017, a 210-page final report by Nigeria's AIB into the crash was released and made public.

The investigation identified the following Probable Causal Factors:

1. Engine number one lost power 17 minutes into the flight, and thereafter on final approach, engine number two lost power and failed to respond to throttle movement on demand for increased power to sustain the aircraft in its flight configuration.

2. The inappropriate omission of the use of the checklist, and the crew's inability to appreciate the severity of the power-related problem, and their subsequent failure to land at the nearest suitable airfield

3. Lack of situational awareness, inappropriate decision making, and poor airmanship

The AIB issued several recommendations to the involved parties, mainly to Dana Air. Nigeria's NCAA was ordered to intensify its oversight, particularly on Maintenance, Repair and Overhaul (MRO). The FAA was asked to ensure that Pratt & Whitney re-categorize the issuance of the service bulletin to mandatory and to re-design the shimming and installation of the manifold assembly so as to prevent incorrect installation.

== Aftermath ==
On 3 June 2013, the government of Lagos unveiled a memorial cenotaph for the victims of Flight 0992.

== See also ==
- Aerosvit Flight 241, pilots refused to declare emergency despite being lost.
- EAS Airlines Flight 4226 – another aircraft with a history of engine problems that crashed after experiencing an engine failure
