= Ilorin (disambiguation) =

Ilorin or Illorin usually refers to the capital city of the Nigerian state of Kwara.

It may also refer to:

- Ilorin Emirate, a traditional state
- Ilorin West, East, and South, local government areas of Ilorin city.
- University of Ilorin
- Ilorin International Airport
- Diocese of Ilorin
