= Nigeria Air =

Proposed flag carrier of Nigeria

Air Nigeria
IATA	ICAO	Call sign
NG	NGAQ	AIR NIGERIA
- Founded: July 2018; 7 years ago
- Commenced operations: October 2023; 2 years ago
- Ceased operations: 2024
- Hubs: Murtala Muhammed International Airport; Nnamdi Azikiwe International Airport
- Parent company: Ethiopian Airlines (49%) (proposed); Nigeria Sovereign Investment Authority (46%); Federal government of Nigeria (5%)

Air Nigeria was the supposed national flag carrier of Nigeria. The name and logo of the airline was unveiled at the Farnborough Air Show in the United Kingdom in July 2018, and was expected to begin operations from 29 May 2023, after it received its first Boeing 737-800 aircraft on 26 May 2023. However, due to opposition from domestic airlines and issues in obtaining Air Operator's Certificate (AOC), it resulted in delays in beginning operations. In August 2023, its parent company, Ethiopian Airlines, announced that the airline will begin operations in October 2023, with a fleet of 8 aircraft and 12 wet-leased aircraft from Boeing.

== History ==
Nigeria Air was announced at the Farnborough Air Show in 2018. Operations are expected to begin in December 2018. Ethiopian Airlines will have a stake in the company with 49% share. In 2017, the Nigerian government announced it will invest US$5 million in the venture. However, the Minister for State Aviation, Hadi Sirika, insists that the airline will be privately-operated. "It is a business, not a social service. The government will not be involved in running it or deciding who runs it. The investors will have full responsibility for this." According to a tweet by Tolu Ogunlesi, a Nigerian government communications official, the government will not own more than 5% of the airline.

Barely two months after its proposal, the Federal Government on 19 September 2018, announced the suspension of the airline, describing the move as a tough decision. The airline was set to take to the skies in a couple of months. Although it was suspended, it received its first aircraft, a Boeing 737-800, on 26 May 2023. As it got the aircraft, Ethiopian Airlines decided to begin operations from 29 May 2023. However, it could not do so due to opposition from most airlines of Nigeria, as they feared that the airline's formation might undermine the influence of other airlines, especially the regional airlines, and issues in obtaining the Air Operator's Certificate (AOC) necessary for beginning operations. The issues were resolved in July 2023, thus clearing the path for the airline to begin operations. In August 2023, Ethiopian Airlines announced that the airline could now begin operations from October 2023, with a fleet of 8 aircraft and 12 wet-leased aircraft from Boeing.

As of May 2024, the proposed national carrier of Nigeria, has been suspended indefinitely due to concerns over its ownership structure and allegations of fraud. The project, unveiled in 2023, planned to allocate 49% ownership to Ethiopian Airlines, 5% to the Nigerian government, and 46% to a consortium of Nigerian investors. This arrangement raised apprehensions about the airline’s true national identity and the extent of foreign involvement. In June 2023, the Nigerian House of Representatives labeled the Nigeria Air project a fraud and called for its suspension. Subsequently, in August 2023, the Minister of Aviation and Aerospace Development, Festus Keyamo, announced the indefinite suspension of the project, emphasizing the need for the national carrier to be wholly Nigerian for the full benefit of the country.

Further complicating the situation, in September 2023, a Federal High Court in Lagos voided the sale of Nigeria Air to Ethiopian Airlines, siding with local aviation stakeholders who opposed the deal. These legal challenges, combined with the government’s stance on ensuring indigenous ownership, have led to the indefinite suspension of Nigeria Air.

== Destinations ==
Nigeria has bilateral air service agreements (BASAs) with 70 countries; however, only 30 are operating at the moment. Since Arik Air and Med-View Airline terminated their long-haul operations, only Air Peace has been operating long-haul flights. The airline is looking at 81 potential destinations. However, Group Captain John Ojikutu, an expert in Nigerian aviation, stated that operation to just 15 of the 30 countries with which Nigeria has functioning BASAs would be an adequate start.

== Fleet ==
The Minister for State Aviation announced that the government is in negotiations with Airbus and Boeing to provide a fleet for the new national airline. In August 2023, Ethiopian Airlines announced that the airline will have a fleet of eight aircraft, out of which six of them will be narrowbody and the remaining two will be widebody. 12 aircraft will be wet-leased from Boeing to cope with the future traffic.

== See also ==
- List of airlines in Nigeria
- Ethiopian Airlines
- Air Peace
