= Remo Ultra Marathon =

The Value-Jet Remo Ultra Marathon race is Nigeria's first Ultramarathon race, comprising athletes from various part of the world

== History ==
In 2017, Value-Jet announced a sponsor deal with the race. It was organized by Kunle Soname.
