= Green Africa Airways =

Nigerian start-up airline

IATA	ICAO	Call sign
Q9	GWG	GREEN AFRICA
- Founded: 15 June 2015; 11 years ago
- Commenced operations: 12 August 2021; 5 years ago
- Operating bases: Murtala Muhammed International Airport
- Fleet size: 1
- Headquarters: Ikeja, Lagos, Nigeria
- Key people: Babawande Afolabi, CEO

Green Africa Airways Ltd is a Nigerian low cost airline, based in Lagos, Nigeria. The airline was founded in 2015 and commenced flights on 12 August 2021.

== History ==
Green Africa Airways was founded on 15 June 2015 by Babawande Afolabi, who serves as the chief executive officer. It was a new low-cost carrier targeting the Nigerian air travel market. Operations were originally planned to start in 2019, but have since been delayed. In mid-2018, the airline received the necessary operating licenses from the Nigerian Civil Aviation Authority. Green Africa's Board of directors consists of industry veterans including Tom Horton, former chairman and CEO of American Airlines; Virasb Vahidi, former CCO of American Airlines; Wale Adeosun, founder and CEO of Kuramo Capital; and Gbenga Oyebode, founder and Chairman of Aluko & Oyebode.

In late 2018, Green Africa announced a letter of intent for 50 Boeing 737 MAX 8s, with an option for a further 50 aircraft. It was the largest order intention Boeing had ever received from an African airline. The order was valued $11.7 billion, according to list prices. However, this letter of intent was withdrawn in February 2020, and the airline instead opted to sign a memorandum of understanding for 50 Airbus A220-300s, which - if actually placed - would also be the largest order Airbus has ever received from an African carrier. Deliveries are scheduled to begin in 2021.

In order to bridge the gap between the first delivery, Green Africa has agreed to lease three A220-300s from GTLK Europe, so that operations would start in 2020, but these were also not delivered. In August 2020, Green Africa announced ex-Chief Financial Officer of SpiceJet - Kiran Koteshwar as the new Group Chief Financial officer starting from September 2020.

On 12 August 2021 the airline commenced operations with the first flight touching down at the Nnamdi Azikiwe International Airport in Abuja, Nigeria.

In March 2022, Green Africa launched a talent initiative - gFuture, facilitated through the Green Africa Academy. This initiative focuses on identifying and training future aviation professionals in various fields. Green Africa expects the program to graduate over 200 pilots, 10 flight dispatchers, 500 cabin crew members, and 140 qualified engineers across the Nigerian aviation industry over the next decade.

== Legal issues ==
In August 2021, Kenny Wole Awosika, filed suit against Green Africa Airways and Babawande Afolabi for $30 million, alleging that they both founded the airline and was not provided with the agreed upon stake in the business. Mr. Awosika, filed the civil action after 2 years of failed mediation and no progress with The Economic and Financial Crimes Commission (EFCC). The matter remains in court.

== Destinations ==
Green Africa Airways intends to initially serve the Nigerian domestic market with plans to further expand service across the African continent.

Country	City	Airport	Notes	Ref.
Nigeria	Abuja	Nnamdi Azikiwe International Airport		
Nigeria	Akure	Akure Airport		
Nigeria	Benin	Benin Airport		
Nigeria	Enugu	Akanu Ibiam International Airport		
Nigeria	Ibadan	Ibadan Airport		
Nigeria	Ilorin	Ilorin International Airport		
Nigeria	Lagos	Murtala Muhammed International Airport		
Nigeria	Owerri	Sam Mbakwe Airport		
Nigeria	Port Harcourt	Port Harcourt International Airport		

== Fleet ==
As of August 2025, Green Africa Airways operates the following aircraft:

Green Africa Airways fleet
Aircraft	In service	Orders	Passengers	Notes
ATR 72-500	1			
Total	1			

In April 2021, the airline took delivery of its first two ATR72-600 aircraft in order to commence certification flights with Nigeria Civil Aviation Authority.

== See also ==
- List of airlines in Nigeria
- Transport in Nigeria
