= Gateway International Airport =

Gateway International Agro-Cargo Airport
- IATA: GWI; ICAO: DNOG

Summary
- Airport type: Public (Agro-Cargo and Passenger)
- Owner/Operator: Ogun State Government
- Serves: Iperu-Remo, Ogun, Nigeria
- Location: Iperu- Remo, Ikenne Local Government Area, Ogun State
- Time zone: WAT (UTC+01:00)
- Coordinates: 6°56′21.26″N 3°42′38.14″E

Map
- Location of the airport in Nigeria

Runways
Direction	Length		Surface
Direction	m	ft	Surface
05/23	4,000	13,123	Asphalt

Gateway International Agro-Cargo Airport ((IATA: GWI, ICAO: DNOG)) is a specialized agro-cargo and passenger airport located in the Ilishan Remo area of the Ogun State of Nigeria. It is owned by the Government of Ogun State.

The airport is strategically positioned near the Lagos-Ibadan Expressway to serve as a logistics hub for the Southwestern region and a designated alternative to the congested Murtala Muhammed International Airport (Lagos).

Its central feature is its 4,000-metre (13,000 ft) long and 60-metre (200 ft) wide runway, which is one of the longest in West Africa, built to accommodate wide-body aircraft such as the Boeing 777 and Airbus A380. The airport has been granted an Interim Aerodrome Operational Permit by the Nigerian Civil Aviation Authority (NCAA).

The airport commenced scheduled commercial passenger flight operations on 7 October 2025.

== Airlines and destinations ==
Airlines	Destinations
ValueJet	Abuja, Lagos

== See also ==
- Transport in Nigeria
- List of airports in Nigeria
- Ogun State
