= Pan Am Flight Academy =

Aviation school

- Type: Subsidiary
- Industry: Airline Training, Pilot Training, Type Ratings, Flight Attendant Training.
- Founded: 1991; 35 years ago
- Headquarters: Miami and Hialeah, Florida, U.S.
- Area served: Worldwide
- Key people: Allesandro Pinho, Chief Executive Officer
- Products: Airline Training Solutions: ATP, Type Ratings, ATP-CTP, B-737-CL, B-737-NG, B-767, B-777, B-747-400, A320, SF-340. Dry lease B-747-200, A330, B-737-200, B-737-MAX Flight Attendant Training
- Owner: Acorn Capital Management
- Website: www.panamacademy.com

Pan Am Flight Academy (formerly Pan Am International Flight Academy) is an aviation school that specializes in training airlines, pilots and aviation professionals from around the world. It is the only remaining division of Pan American World Airways, which declared bankruptcy in January 1991 and shut down in December of that year. Under the terms of the bankruptcy, the flight academy was allowed to remain open independently.

== History ==
In the early 1980s, Pan American World Airways' International Flight Academy opened for business in a new building located at the Miami International Airport (MIA). This training division operated until the airline closed on December 4, 1991. Under the terms of the airline bankruptcy, the training academy was permitted to remain open independently in 1992 under its current name, Pan Am International Flight Academy. The company began operations by using the flight simulator of the former airline at the same campus location.

In 2006, American Capital Strategies invested $58 million in Pan Am. Pan Am International Flight Academy, based out of Miami International Airport, has trained a substantial number of students from India. The flight academies Career Pilot Development (CPD) created a new training program for military veterans in 2006.

In 2010, Pan Am International Flight Academy purchased Miami-based Aeroservice Aviation Center, LLC, located only a few blocks away. Under the terms of this agreement, Pan Am purchased all of Aeroservice's training and simulator assets, adding significantly to Pan Am's Miami training capabilities, classrooms, and campus size.

On July 30, 2013, ANA Holdings, the holding company of All Nippon Airways, announced they would acquire Pan Am Holdings, including Pan Am International Flight Academy. ANA sold Pan Am to private investors in 2020 who renamed the company Pan Am Flight Academy.

In 2017 Pan Am International Flight Academy was awarded the Corporate Achievement Award by the Greater Miami Aviation Association recognizing the contributions of the corporation to the aviation industry. Pan Am International Flight Academy, was awarded the Export Achievement Certificate by the Denver office of the U.S. Commercial Services Division, a branch of the U.S. Department of Commerce.

In 2025, Pan Am was purchased by Acorn Capital Management.

== Aviation school ==
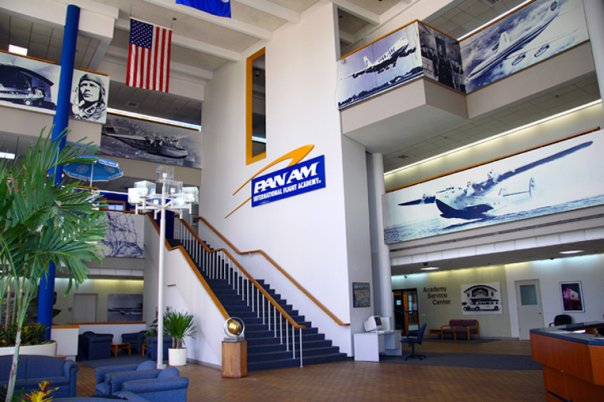
PAFA Lobby

The flight academy, headquartered in Miami, trains pilots and aviation professionals from around the world. In 2017 Pan Am International Flight Academy trained over 5,000 individuals. Core training programs include pilot training, airline crew training, type rating training, ATP-CTP, and, flight attendant or cabin crew training.

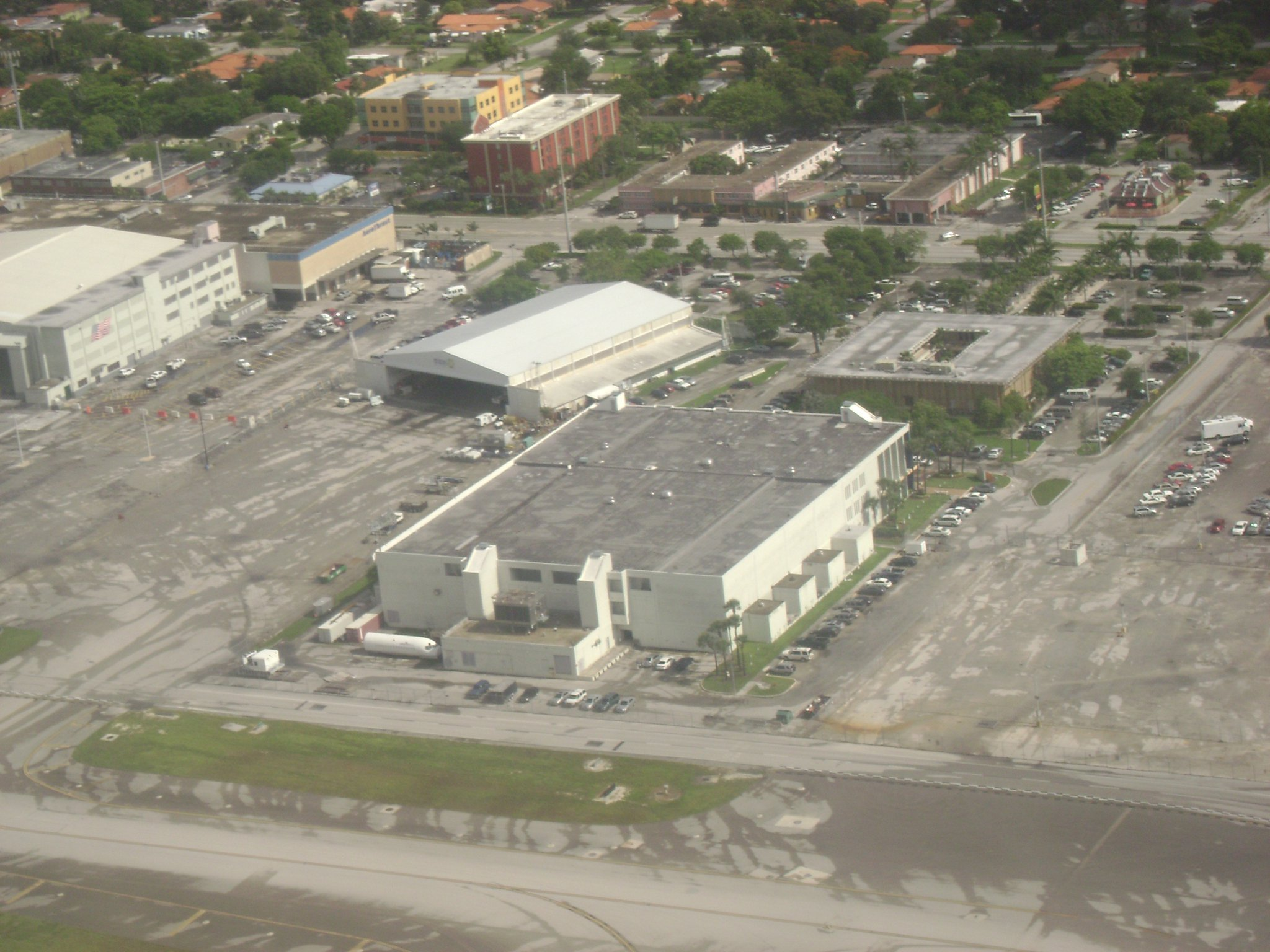
Bird's eye view of flight school

Pan Am Flight Academy has training centers in Miami and Hialeah, FL. The company is approved to train pilots by the FAA Federal Aviation Administration.

Pan Am currently owns and operates more than 30 simulators and Flight Training devices and provides type-specific training for the Boeing 737 Classic, Boeing 737 Next Generation, Boeing 747-400, Boeing 767, Boeing 777, Airbus A320 family, and the Saab 340.

In April 2023, the Pan Am Flight Academy acquired a B737 MAX-8 simulator. This new simulator features the latest in technology and equipped with an L3 Harris RealitySeven technology.

== September 11 attacks ==
On August 17, 2001, Zacarias Moussaoui, the so-called "20th hijacker" of the September 11, 2001, attacks, was arrested after an instructor at Pan Am International Flight Academy became suspicious of him. In a piece in The New York Times, Michael Erlandson, chief of staff on the Appropriations Subcommittee on Transportation is quoted as saying: "The Pan Am people are heroes who worked very diligently to make themselves heard at the FBI."

== Television and film ==
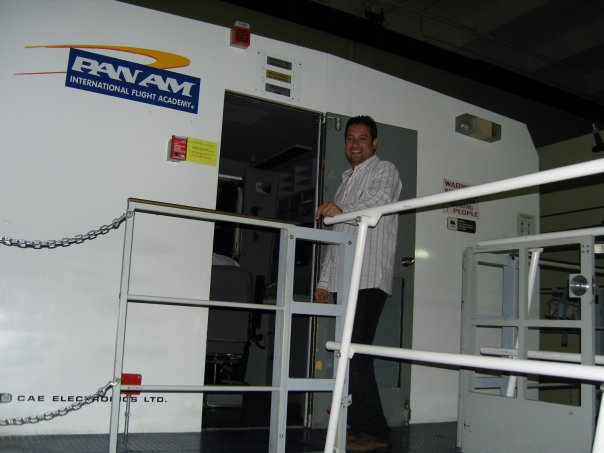
One of the flight simulators

Because of their flight simulators and professional aviators, the Pan Am International Flight Academy is often approached to allow usage of their equipment and experts to TV shows and films.
