= Benin Airport =

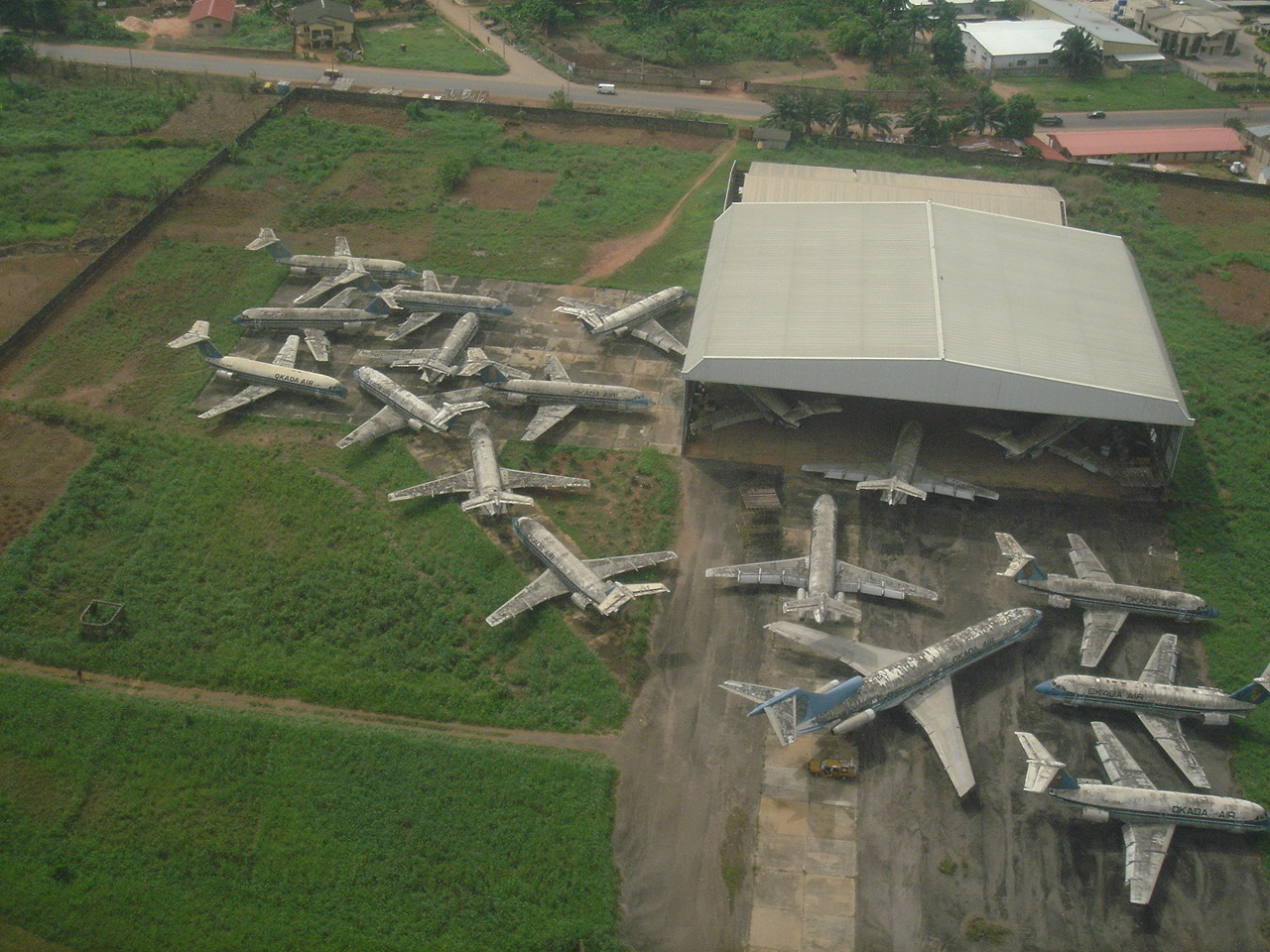
- IATA: BNI; ICAO: DNBE

Summary
- Airport type: Public
- Owner/Operator: Federal Airports Authority of Nigeria
- Serves: Benin City, Nigeria
- Time zone: WAT (UTC+01:00)
- Elevation AMSL: 259 ft (79 m)
- Coordinates: 6°19′00″N 5°36′00″E

Map
- Location of Airport in Nigeria

Runways
Direction	Length		Surface
Direction	m	ft	Surface
05/23	2,400	7,874	Asphalt
- Sources: GCM WAD

Benin Airport (IATA: BNI, ICAO: DNBE) is an airport serving Benin City, the capital of Edo State in Nigeria. The runway is in the middle of the city.

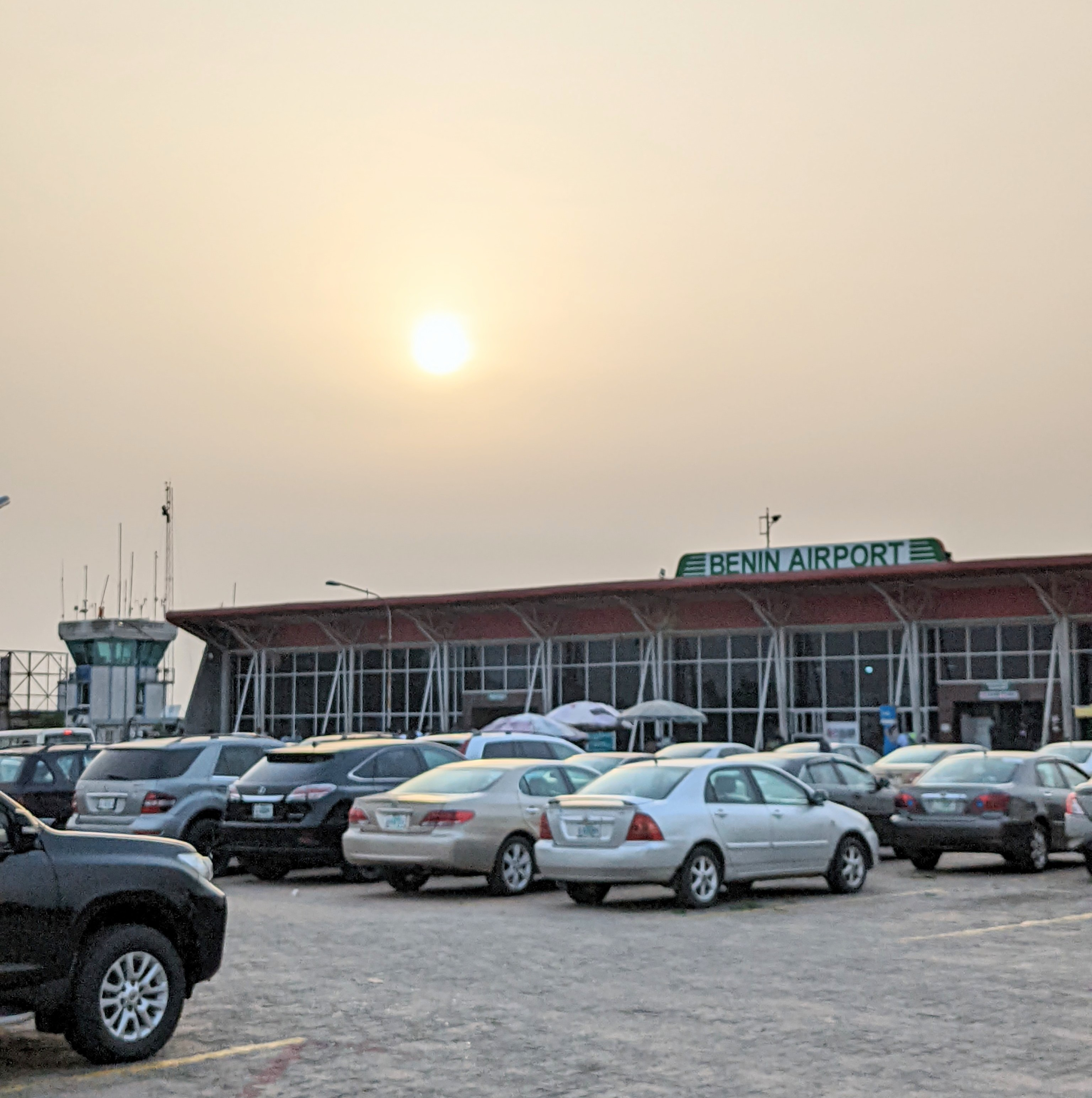
Front View of Benin City Airport

== History ==
Benin City Airport was built in the 1970s as a small airfield to serve the local community. Over the years, it has undergone several upgrades and expansions to become a modern airport, with a new terminal building and improved facilities. In 2007, the airport was renovated and expanded to accommodate larger aircraft and increase passenger capacity.

On 26 June 2023, the airport has been renamed.

== Facilities ==
The airport has a modern terminal building, duty-free shops, restaurants, currency exchange services, and car rental services. The airport also has a runway that is 2,451 m (8,041 ft) long and 45 m (148 ft) wide, with a taxiway and apron facilities. The airport has a capacity to handle up to 500 passengers per hour.

== Airlines and destinations ==
Benin City Airport is served by several airlines, including Air Peace, Arik Air, Green Africa Airways, and United Nigeria Airlines. The airport offers flights to Abuja, Lagos, and Port Harcourt.

Airlines	Destinations
Aero Contractors	Abuja, Lagos
Air Peace	Abuja, Lagos, Port Harcourt
Arik Air	Abuja, Lagos
Green Africa Airways	Abuja, Lagos
United Nigeria Airlines	Abuja, Lagos

== Statistics ==
- On-Time Performance (OTP): 3.8/5 stars (source: FlightStats)
- Number of Flights: 18 flights on 2 different routes (source: FlightRadar24)
- Popular Routes: Connects BNI to 2 different cities in 1 different country (source: FlightRadar24)

== Location ==
The airport is located in the heart of Benin City, approximately 7 km (4.3 mi) northeast of the city center. It is easily accessible by taxi or car, with parking facilities available for passengers and visitors.

== See also ==
- Transport in Nigeria
- List of airports in Nigeria
- List of the busiest airports in Africa
