= Bet9ja =

Nigerian online bookmaker company

- Screenshot
- Company type: Limited liability company
- Website type: Online gambling
- Headquarters: Lagos, {{{location_country}}}
- Area served: International
- Founders: Ayo Ojuroye and Kunle Soname
- Key people: Ayo Ojuroye (CEO) Kunle Soname (Chairman)
- Industry: Gambling
- Products: Bookmaking; Online casino; Sports betting
- Parent: KC Gaming Networks Limited
- Website: www.bet9ja.com
- Registration: Optional
- Launched: 10 September 2013
- Current status: Online
- Written in: aspx

Bet9ja is an online bookmaker company that offers betting on major sporting events operating in Nigeria. Traded under KC Gaming Networks Limited and run by a series of shareholders of multiple nationalities, the website is licensed by the Lagos State Lotteries Board (LSLB) with permission to operate in other parts of Nigeria.

Bet9ja.com is the third most-visited website in Nigeria after Google.com and Youtube.com in late April 2020, according to Alexa, a global internet traffic ranking firm. It is also the first most-visited local site in Nigeria and the only Nigerian website in the top 500 most-visited websites globally as of April 2020, according to a recent listing by IABC Africa.

Bet9ja was co-founded by Ayo Ojuroye and Kunle Soname who are its CEO and chairman respectively. In 2022, Bet9ja became the official sponsor/partner of the Nigeria Professional Football League.

Bet9ja was the headline sponsor of the 2019 edition of Big Brother Naija.

== See also ==
- Online gambling
