= General Tunde Idiagbon International Airport =

Airport serving Ilorin, Nigeria

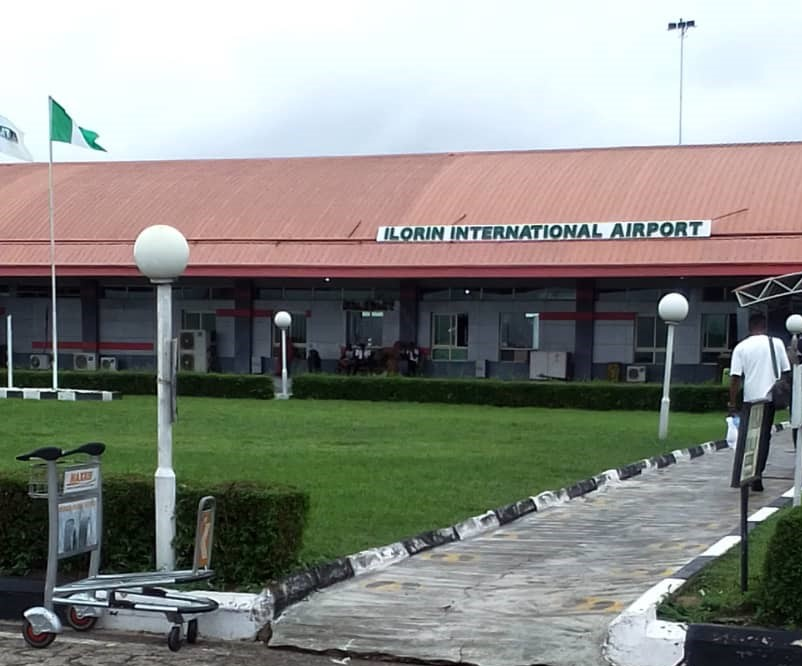
- IATA: ILR; ICAO: DNIL

Summary
- Airport type: Public
- Owner/Operator: Federal Airports Authority of Nigeria
- Serves: Ilorin; Offa; Ogbomoso
- Time zone: WAT (UTC+01:00)
- Elevation AMSL: 1,126 ft (343 m)
- Coordinates: 8°26′25″N 4°29′40″E

Map
- Location of the airport in Nigeria

Runways
Direction	Length		Surface
Direction	m	ft	Surface
05/23	3,100	10,171	Asphalt, concrete
- Sources: WAD GCM

General Tunde Idiagbon International Airport (IATA: ILR, ICAO: DNIL), also known as Ilorin Airport, is an airport serving Ilorin, the capital city of Kwara State in Nigeria. The Airport is owned and operated by Federal Airports Authority of Nigeria (FAAN) and is located about 1.8 km (1.1 mi) from downtown Ilorin. The airport has one runway, which is 3,100 m (10,200 ft) long and 60 m (200 ft) wide, with an approach of 121.2MHz.

== History ==
Ilorin International Airport serves as a secondary airport to Lagos Airport and is situated approximately an hour's drive from Lokoja, the Kogi State capital. Recently, the terminal building of Ilorin International Airport has gone through renovations to accommodate up to 500 passengers at once. The commissioning of the airport was done by President Olusegun Obasanjo, who also laid the foundation of the airport's cargo shed projected to be completed in March 2007.

The airport was initially commissioned on 16 February 1978, and is located in the Fili area of Ilorin, around 9 km (5.6 mi) southwest of Ilorin town. but it was upgraded to international status in 2012. Ilorin International Airport is the main airport serving Ilorin, the capital of Kwara State, Nigeria.

The most popular airlines that fly to Ilorin International Airport are Air Peace, Overland, and Green Africa. The most popular destinations from Ilorin International Airport are Abuja and Lagos. The airport is served by two airlines, Air Peace and Azman Air. They operate flights to Lagos, Abuja, and Port Harcourt.The airport is undergoing a number of improvements, including the construction of a new terminal building and the expansion of the runway. These improvements are expected to make the airport more efficient and able to handle more passengers, this is an increase of over 20% from the previous year.

== Airlines and destinations ==
Airlines	Destinations
Air Peace	Abuja, Lagos
Green Africa Airways	Abuja, Lagos
Overland Airways	Abuja, Lagos

== Accidents and incidents ==
- On 29 April 1992, a Boeing 707-351C of GAS Air Nigeria, registration 9G-RBO, made an inadvertent belly landing on a test flight. There were no fatalities but the aircraft was written off.
- In May 2019, a Diamond DA42 Twin Star light aircraft, registration number 5N-BNH, belly landed on the runway at Ilorin. The two occupants were unharmed.

== See also ==
- Transport in Nigeria
- List of airports in Nigeria
