= Kunle Soname =

Nigerian politician, entrepreneur, sport enthusiast

Kunle Soname is a Nigerian entrepreneur, sport enthusiast and the chairman of Bet9ja, a betting website he founded in 2013. He is also the first Nigerian to acquire a European club C.D. Feirense which he bought in 2015. He is the Founder of the private Nigerian airline ValueJet.

== Early life and education ==
Soname studied Estate Management at Obafemi Awolowo University where he graduated in 1988. He served as the Executive Chairman of Ikosi-isheri Local Council, a post he held till 2011.

== Career ==
Remo Stars Football Club previously known as FC DENDER was founded by Soname in 2004. The club was then relocated from Lagos State to Remo area of Ogun State, and is now playing in the Nigerian Premier League's Top Division. Under the ownership of Kunle Soname, Remo Stars F.C. won its first Nigeria Premier Football League title during the 2024–25 season.

Soname became the owner of C.D. Feirense in 2015.

In 2022, Kunle was inducted as a patron at the University of Lagos for his philanthropic activities. He is also the owner of Beyond Limits F.A.

== Personal life ==
Soname is married to Kemi Soname and they have a daughter Erioluwa.
