= Dana Air =

Nigerian airline

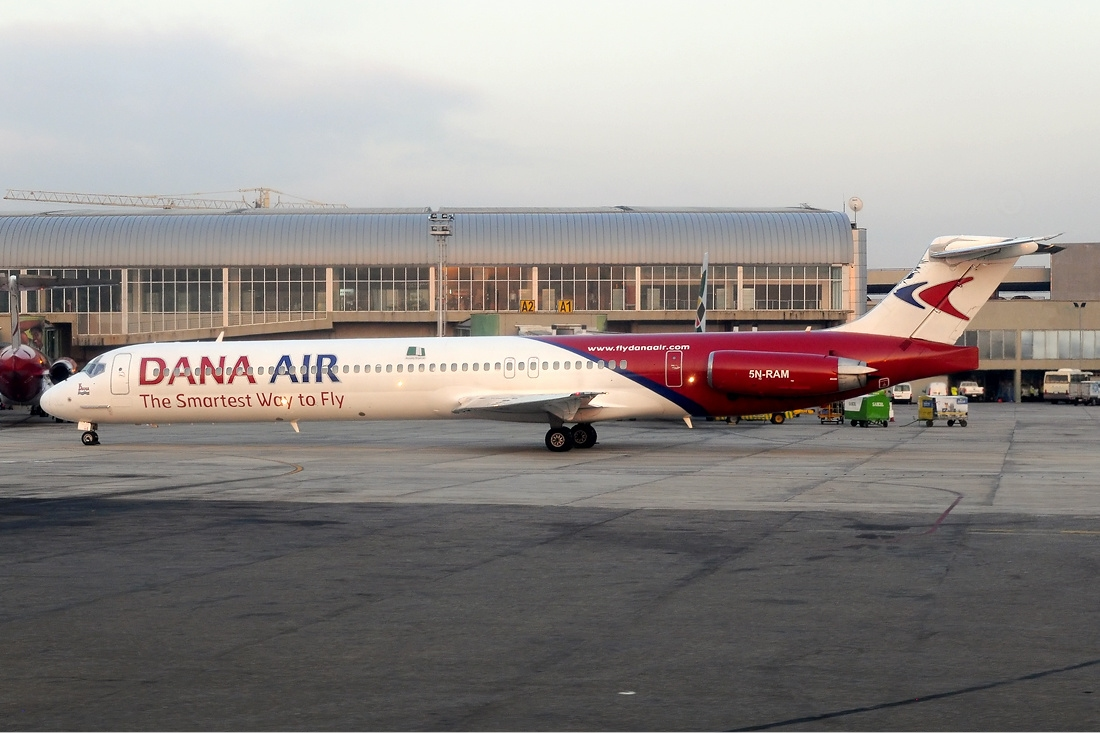
IATA	ICAO	Call sign
9J	DAN	DANACO
- Founded: 2008
- Commenced operations: November 10, 2008
- Ceased operations: April 23, 2024
- Hubs: Murtala Muhammed International Airport
- Focus cities: Lagos, Abuja, Port Harcourt, Owerri, Enugu
- Fleet size: 5
- Destinations: 5
- Parent company: Dana Group
- Headquarters: Dana House, 116 Oshodi-Isolo Expressway, 5star bus stop, Lagos, Nigeria
- Key people: Hathiramani Ranesh (MD)
- Employees: 500
- Website: flydanaair.com at the Wayback Machine (archived 20 September 2024)

Dana Air was a Nigerian airline headquartered in Ikeja, in the southwest of the country, and based in Lagos's Murtala Muhammed International Airport.

== History ==
Foundation and Early Operations

Dana Airlines Limited, operating as Dana Air. was formed as a fully private sector carrier. The airline commenced flight operations on 10 November 2008 and since its inauguration, progressively expanded its route network.

Growth and Milestones

By November 2018, the airline celebrated its 10-year anniversary, remarking on its achievements in employment, service, and domestic route coverage. By its 15-year mark the carrier claimed to have carried "over 36 million passengers" since launch. In 2019, it reported that in its first 11 years, it had flown some 5.4 million passengers.

In July 2018, Dana Air won the Association of Foreign Airlines and Representatives in Nigeria "Best Customer-Friendly Domestic Airline" award, which the airline cited as recognition of its service and on-time performance.

Codeshare Agreement

In May 2021, Dana Air teamed up with Ibom Air to launch the first-ever domestic airline codeshare agreement by Nigerian air carriers.

Operational Challenges and Regulatory Action

On 20 July 2022, the airline had both its license and certificate suspended by the Nigerian authorities after it was deemed financially unfit to maintain operations. The airline claimed that the increase in the cost of jet fuel, unavailability of foreign exchange, and inflation were contributory factors.

Dana Air announced it would resume flight operations on November 9, 2022, after having been suspended for four months. The Nigerian Civil Aviation Authority (NCAA) had suspended the airline for regulatory infractions including maintenance violations and operating aircraft without licensed captains. Dana Air said the resumption follows a successful audit by the NCAA and a restructuring under new management to ensure safe and reliable flights.

Cessation of Operations

On 23 April 2024, a Dana Air aircraft (registration 5N-BKI) skidded off the runway at Murtala Muhammed International Airport, Lagos, while attempting to land. Following the incident, the Minister of Aviation directed the NCAA to suspend the airline's operations immediately to conduct a full safety and financial audit.

According to the aviation profiling service CAPA - Centre for Aviation, the airline is considered to have ceased operations as of 23 April 2024.

== Destinations ==
Dana Air served the following destinations:

Nigeria

- Abuja – Nnamdi Azikiwe International Airport
- Enugu – Akanu Ibiam International Airport
- Lagos – Murtala Muhammed International Airport (Hub)
- Owerri – Sam Mbakwe International Cargo Airport
- Port Harcourt – Port Harcourt International Airport

== Fleet ==
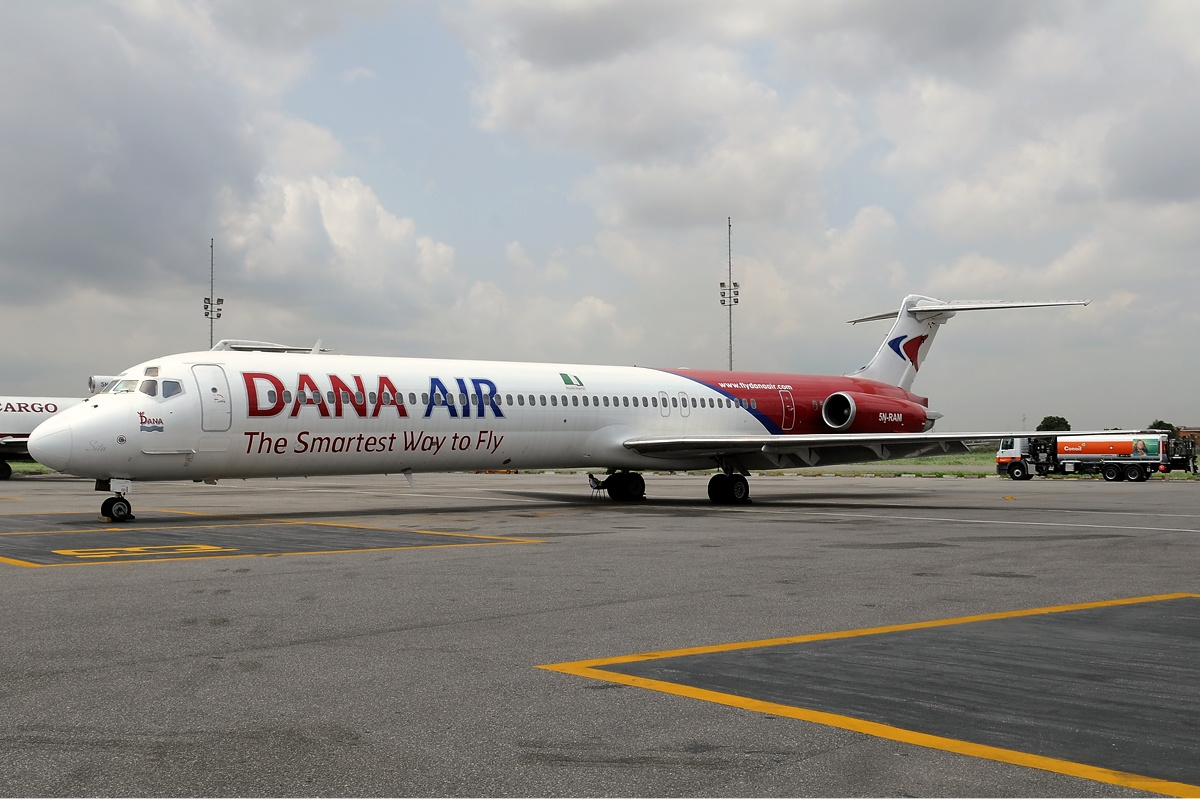
Dana Air McDonnell Douglas MD-83. This was the aircraft involved in Dana Air Flight 0992.

Dana Air operated the following aircraft:

Dana Air fleet
Aircraft	In fleet	Orders	Notes
Boeing 737-300	1	—	
McDonnell Douglas MD-82	1	—	
McDonnell Douglas MD-83	3	—	
Total	5	—	

== Incidents and accidents ==
- On 3 June 2012, a Dana Air McDonnell Douglas MD-83 operating as Flight 0992 crashed into a two-story building at Iju Railway, Ishaga, a suburb of Lagos. All 153 people on the aircraft were killed. Following the crash, all flights by Dana Air were halted by Nigeria's Civil Aviation Authority (NCAA).
- On 7 February 2018, a Dana Air flight landed in Abuja and was taxiing on the runway when one of the emergency exit doors fell off. No casualties resulted from the incident. Passengers claimed that the door rattled throughout the flight. A spokesperson for the airline, however claimed that the door could not have fallen off without a conscious effort by a passenger. The Nigerian Civil Aviation Authority instituted an investigation into the incident to determine what exactly happened.
- On 20 February 2018, a Dana Air MD-83 with registration 5N-SRI veered off the runway at Port-Harcourt international airport during a night landing. There were no casualties, but the aircraft suffered significant damage. Both the airline and the Federal Airports Authority of Nigeria stated that the cause of the accident was inclement weather as there was torrential rain at the time of the landing.
- On 23 April 2024, Dana Air Flight 0352, a MD-82 registered 5N-BKI, skidded off the runway while landing at Murtala Muhammed International Airport in Lagos. None of the 83 people on board were injured, but the aircraft was severely damaged.
