= Government of Enugu State =

State and Local governments in Enugu State, Nigeria

The State Government and the Local Government are the two levels of government in Enugu State in Nigeria.

The governor is above a group of commissioners who he has placed as heads of ministries that oversee various portfolios. Both the governor and the commissioners form the Executive Council of Enugu State.

== Agencies in Enugu state ==
- Enugu State Emergency Management
- Volunteer Service Agency
- Enugu State Agency for the control of Aids (ENSACA)
- Project Development and Implementation Unit
- Enugu State Solid Waste Management Authority
- Enugu SERVICOM
- Boundary Adjustment Committee
- Enugu State Management Company
- Nigeria Construction and Furniture Company
- Small and Medium Enterprise Development
- Emene Floor Mill
- Orba Market Development Authority
- State Industrial Estate Management Board
- Niger Gas Company Limited
- Enugu State Vegetable Oil Products Limited
- Niger steel Company Limited
- Aluminium Factory Ohebe Dim
- State Tourism Board
- Nike Lake Resort Hotel
- Presidential Hotel
- Ikenga Hotel Nsukka
- Examination Development Centre
- Post Primary School Management Board
- State Universal University Science and Technology
- Enugu State Scholarship and Education Loans board
- Education Resource Centre
- Oji River Special Centre
- Ogbete Special Education Centre
- Agency for Mass Literacy
- Institute of Management and Technology Enugu
- Enugu State College of Education (Technical)
- State Science, Technical and Vocational Education Management Board
- State Library Board
- Army Recruitment Centre
- Muslim Pilgrim Board
- Christian Pilgrim Welfare Board
- Enugu State Community Resource Centre.
- Veterinary School, Achi
- Tractor Hiring Services
- Fertilizer Procurement Distribution Company
- United Palm Product Limited (UPPL)
- ADARICE Production Company
- ENADEP
- Statement Premier Cashew Industry
- Grains Production Agency
- College of Agriculture and Agro Entrepreneurial Studies
- Traditional Rulers Council
- Examination Development Centre
- Post Primary School Management Board
- State Universal University Science and Technology
- Enugu State Scholarship and Education Loans board
- Education Resource Centre
- Oji River Special Centre
- Ogbete Special Education Centre
- Agency for Mass Literacy
- Institute of Management and Technology Enugu
- Enugu State College of Education (Technical)
- State Science, Technical and Vocational Education Management Board
- State Library Board
- Enugu State Forestry Commission
- Board of Internal Revenue
- State Gaming Commission Orientation Insurance Company
- Ministry of Finance Incorporation
- State Health Board
- District Health Boards
- ESUT Specialist Hospital, Park Lane
- School of Health Technology
- School of Midwifery
- Traditional Medicine Board
- Local Health Authority
- State Housing Development Corporation
- State Cooperative College
- Vocational Rehabilitation Centre, Emene
- State Approved School, Ngwo
- Remand Home, Akwuke
- ESBS/TV
- Enugu State Printing Publishing Corp
- Advisory Council on Prerogative of Mercy
- Justice Reforms
- Enugu Citizens Right and Mediation Centre
- Administrator-General/Public Trustee
- Community Development Project (Enugu State Assisted)
- Rural Electrification Board
- Enugu State Fire Service
- Agency for Community and Social Development
- Rural Development Fund (Management)
- Raw Material Display Centre
- ICT Agency
- Enugu State Transport Company (ENTRACO)
- Enugu State Traffic Management Authority
- Enugu State Rural Water supply and Sanitation Agency
- Enugu State water Corporation
- Small Towns Water and Sanitation Agency
- Pre-stressing Concrete Company Limited
- Nigerian Construction and Furniture Company (NCFC)
- Enugu State Road Maintenance
- Rangers Management Corporation
- Awgu Games council
- State Sports Council

== Executive Members ==
Office	Incumbent commissioner
State Governor	Barr Peter Mbah
Deputy Governor Enugu State	Barr. Ifeanyi Ossai
Secretary to state government	Prof. Chidiebere Onyia
Head of Service	Dr Nonso Godwin Anigbo mni
Ministry of Justice	Chief Miletus Ezugworie.E
Ministry of Information	Ogbuagu Anikwe
Special Adviser on ICT to the Governor	Nnaemeka Gabriel .Ani
Ministry of Commerce and Industry]	Barr. Sam Ogbu Nwobodo
Ministry of Enugu Capital Dev. Authority	Barr. Chidi Aroh
SSA on ICT to the Governor	Nwankwo.Nonso
Ministry of Youths and Sports	Nzekwe Manfred
