= Aero Contractors (Nigeria) =

Nigerian airline

| IATA | ICAO | Call sign |
|---|---|---|
| N2 | NIG | AEROLINE |
- Founded: 1959
- Hubs: Murtala Muhammed Airport
- Fleet size: 8
- Destinations: 13
- Parent company: Asset Management Corporation of Nigeria (60%)
- Headquarters: Lagos Murtala Muhammed Airport; Ikeja, Lagos State, Nigeria
- Key people: Ado Sanusi (CEO)
- Website: www.flyaero.com

Aero Contractors Company of Nigeria Limited, known as Aero Contractors or simply Aero, is a state-controlled Nigerian airline company based at Murtala Muhammed International Airport in Ikeja, Lagos State, Nigeria. Furthermore, it operates helicopter services and fixed wing domestic and international scheduled passenger services, air charter and third party aircraft operations, largely in support of Nigeria's extensive oil and gas industry.

== History ==
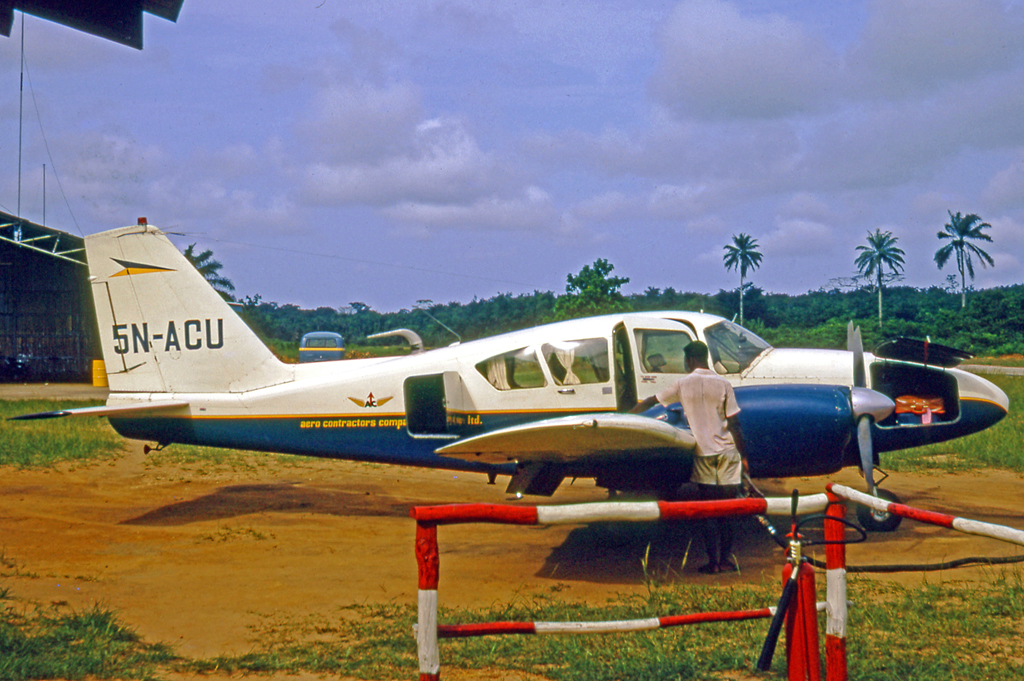
A Piper PA-23 Aztec six-seat charter aircraft of Aero Contractors in 1970, pictured at Warri Airport after a flight from Lagos Ikeja Airport

Aero Contractors was formed in 1959 and officially registered in Nigeria in 1960. At that time, it was a wholly owned by Schreiner Airways B.V. of the Netherlands.

It became a company with initially 40% Nigerian holding in 1973 and subsequently 60% in 1976, anticipating the requirements of the Nigerian Enterprises Promotion Decree of 1977, also known as the indigenization decree. In January 2004, Schreiner Airways was bought by CHC Helicopter (CHC), which acquired a 40% holding in Aero, while the 60% majority share remained within the Ibru family.

On 1 July 2010, CHC sold its interests in Aero for the consideration of 1 Nigerian naira, when Aero became wholly owned by the Ibru family.

In March 2013, industrial action grounded flights for 18 days, in a dispute over outsourcing and reduction in staff numbers. The strike, from 13–28 March, grounded Aero's active fleet of nine aircraft, and was reported to have cost the airline at least N10bn in ticket sales.

After financial intervention, the Asset Management Corporation of Nigeria (AMCON), an arm of the Federal Government of Nigeria, held 60% of Aero, and in August 2013 it was reported that AMCON had taken over the management of the carrier. Hugh Fraser was named as new CEO.

In August 2013 there was press speculation that the Federal Government will use Aero Contractors as the nucleus of a new national carrier, recapitalizing it through a N200 billion initial public offering (IPO). The new airline was allegedly to be known as 'Nigerian Eagle', several years after the liquidation of the defunct flag carrier Nigeria Airways, and that the airline would commence full operations before the end of the year (2013). The factual basis for this report was the repainting of an Aero plane in the colours of the Nigeria national football team, the Super Eagles. The Ministry of Air Transport, however, clarified the repainting of the aircraft was only publicity related to the qualification of the National team for the 2014 World Cup.

In 2016, Aero Contractors became the first official airline casualty of Nigeria's worsening economic crisis after it announced it would suspend all scheduled operations with effect from 1 September 2016. However, since December 2016 the airline has gradually returned to full operations, operating 6,717 flights in 2019.

In 2021 two A320s were added to the Aero fleet from Heston Airlines of Lithuania.

In 2022 it suspended due to fuel scarcity. Later it resumed operations not much long after.

== Corporate affairs ==
=== Ownership ===
Aero was wholly owned by the Ibru family. Asset Management Corporation of Nigeria (AMCON) now owns 60% of the shares, with the remaining 40% owned by Ibru family interests.

=== Structure and partnerships ===
Aero has two divisions:

1. Aero Nigeria – provides scheduled passenger services in Nigeria and western Africa.
2. Rotary Wing – provides helicopter services for the oil and gas industry in Nigeria.

Aero still has a technical partnership with CHC regarding its rotary wing division.

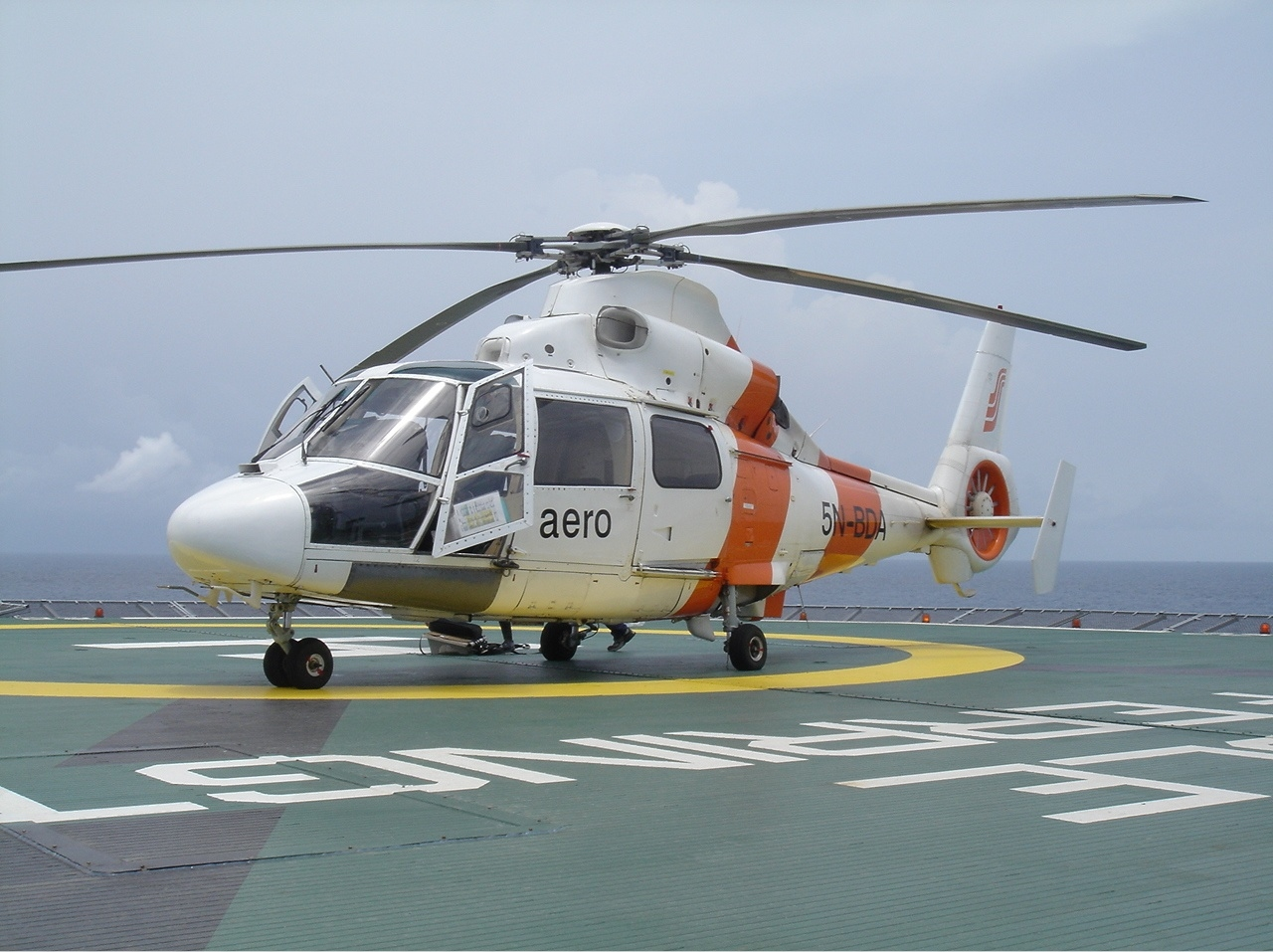
Aero Contractors Aerospatiale SA-365N Dauphin 2, in 2005

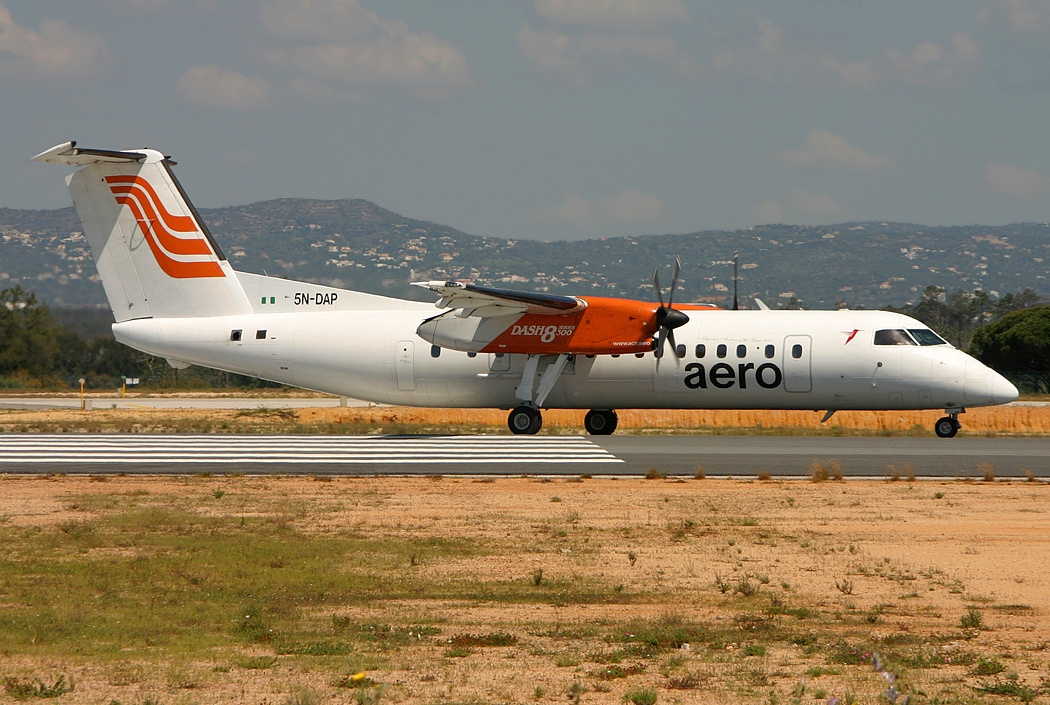
A de Havilland Canada Dash 8 of Aero Contractors in 2006, pictured at Faro Airport, Portugal

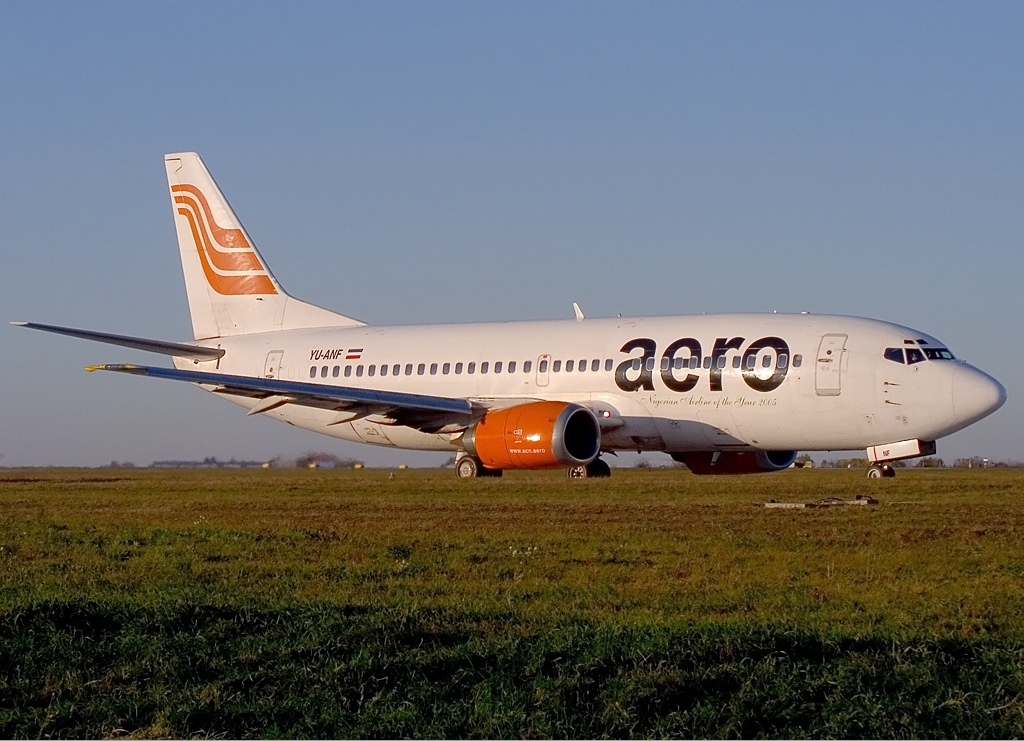
An Aero Contractors Boeing 737-300 (now retired)

=== Business trends ===
Aero Contractors was an active airline until 2016, when the recession in Nigeria forced a brief closure of operations. Activity has slowly increased since then, but full formal accounts do not seem to be published; recent available figures, largely from press reports, are shown below (for years ending 31 December):

| | 2015 | 2016 | 2017 | 2018 | 2019 |
|---|---|---|---|---|---|
| Number of aircraft - fixed wing (at year end) | | 17 | 1 | 6 | 7 |
| Number of aircraft - helicopter (at year end) | | | 1 | 5 | |
| Notes/sources | | | | | |

== Destinations ==
Aero serves the following destinations:

Nigeria

1. Abuja - Nnamdi Azikiwe International Airport
2. Asaba - Asaba International Airport
3. Benin City - Benin Airport
4. Calabar - Magaret Ekpo International Airport (as Cally Air)
5. Kano - Aminu Kano Airport
6. Lagos - Murtala Mohammed International Airport Hub
7. Port Harcourt - Port Harcourt International Airport
8. Sokoto - Sadiq Abubakar III International Airport
9. Yola - Yola Airport

== Fleet ==
=== Current fleet ===
As of August 2025, Aero Contractors operates the following aircraft:

Aero Contractors fleet
| Aircraft | In service | Orders | Passengers | Notes |
|---|---|---|---|---|
| Boeing 737-300 | 2 | — | 149 | |
| Boeing 737-400 | 1 | | | |
| Boeing 737-500 | 3 | | | |
| De Havilland Canada DHC-8-Q300 | 1 | | | |
| De Havilland Canada DHC-8-Q400 | 1 | | | |
| Total | 8 | - | | |

=== Historical fleet ===
The airline fixed wing fleet previously included the following aircraft:

- 6 Boeing 737-300 (2003-2009)
- 6 further Boeing 737-400
- 4 further Boeing 737-500
- 1 De Havilland Dash 8-Q100 (1995-2009)
- 10 further De Havilland Dash 8-Q300 (1997-2012)
