= Ibom Air =

Nigerian airline

Coordinates: 04°52′43″N 08°05′30″E

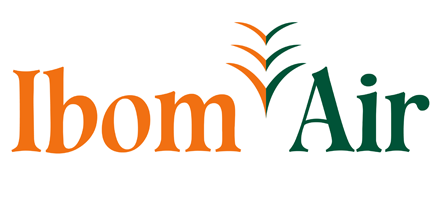

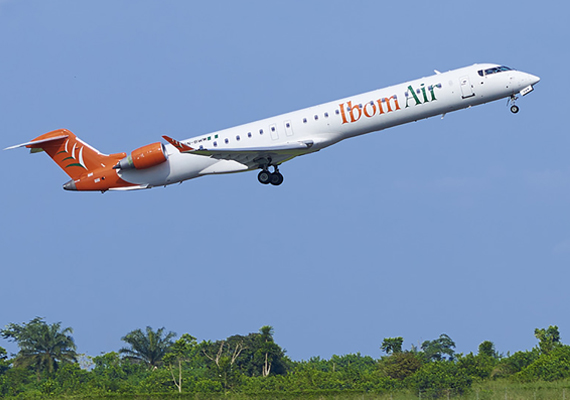
IATA	ICAO	Call sign
QI	IAN	IBOM
- Founded: 2019
- Commenced operations: 7 June 2019; 7 years ago
- Hubs: Victor Attah International Airport
- Focus cities: Uyo, Lagos, Abuja, Calabar, Enugu, Port Harcourt, Accra, Ghana
- Frequent-flyer program: Ibom Flyer
- Fleet size: 10
- Destinations: 7
- Website: www.ibomair.com

Ibom Air is a Nigerian airline owned by the Akwa Ibom State Government. The airline flies domestically, regionally and internationally. Commercial flights started on 7 June 2019.

== History ==
The airline commenced operations on 7 June 2019 when a Bombardier CRJ900 aircraft marked with the Ibom Air name took off from Victor Attah International Airport (IATA: QUO), Uyo, with government officials on board, en route to Murtala Muhammed International Airport in Lagos. Akwa Ibom is the first state in the country to own an airline.

In May 2021, the airline also signed Nigeria's first domestic codeshare agreement, with another airline, Dana Air. Dana Air COO, Obi Mbanuzuo said the agreement is "the first of its kind for domestic airlines in Nigeria". Mbanuzuo added: "We do hope that this partnership... will set a positive precedent for the greater good of the industry".

In April 2023, the Ibom Air was awarded the International Air Transport Association's (IATA) Operational Safety Audit (IOSA) Certificate, and officially joined IATA in August that year.

On 14 June 2026, Ibom Air announced that the airline will use terminal 2 of the Uyo airport instead of terminal 1 that they used since 2019.

== Destinations ==
Country	City	Airport	Notes
Ghana	Accra	Accra International Airport	International
Nigeria	Abuja	Nnamdi Azikiwe International Airport	Focus city
Nigeria	Calabar	Margaret Ekpo International Airport	Local
Nigeria	Enugu	Akanu Ibiam International Airport	Local
Nigeria	Lagos	Murtala Muhammed International Airport	Focus city
Nigeria	Port Harcourt	Port Harcourt International Airport	Local
Nigeria	Uyo	Victor Attah International Airport	Hub

=== Interline agreements ===
- APG Airlines

== Fleet ==
As of August 2025, Ibom Air operates the following aircraft:

Aircraft	In fleet	Orders	Notes
Airbus A220-300	3	8	
Bombardier CRJ900	7		
Total	10		

The Ibom Air fleet previously consisted of:

1 further Airbus A220-300 (Leased from EgyptAir)

4 Airbus A320-200 (Leased from Getjet airlines, Getjet Airlines Latvia, and Airhub Airlines)

In August 2024, the airline received its second Airbus A220-300 which was acquired from Carlyle Aviation.

== See also ==
- Air Peace
- Akwa Ibom Transport Company
