= Margaret Ekpo International Airport =

Airport serving Calabar, Nigeria

Margaret Ekpo International Airport Calabar Airport
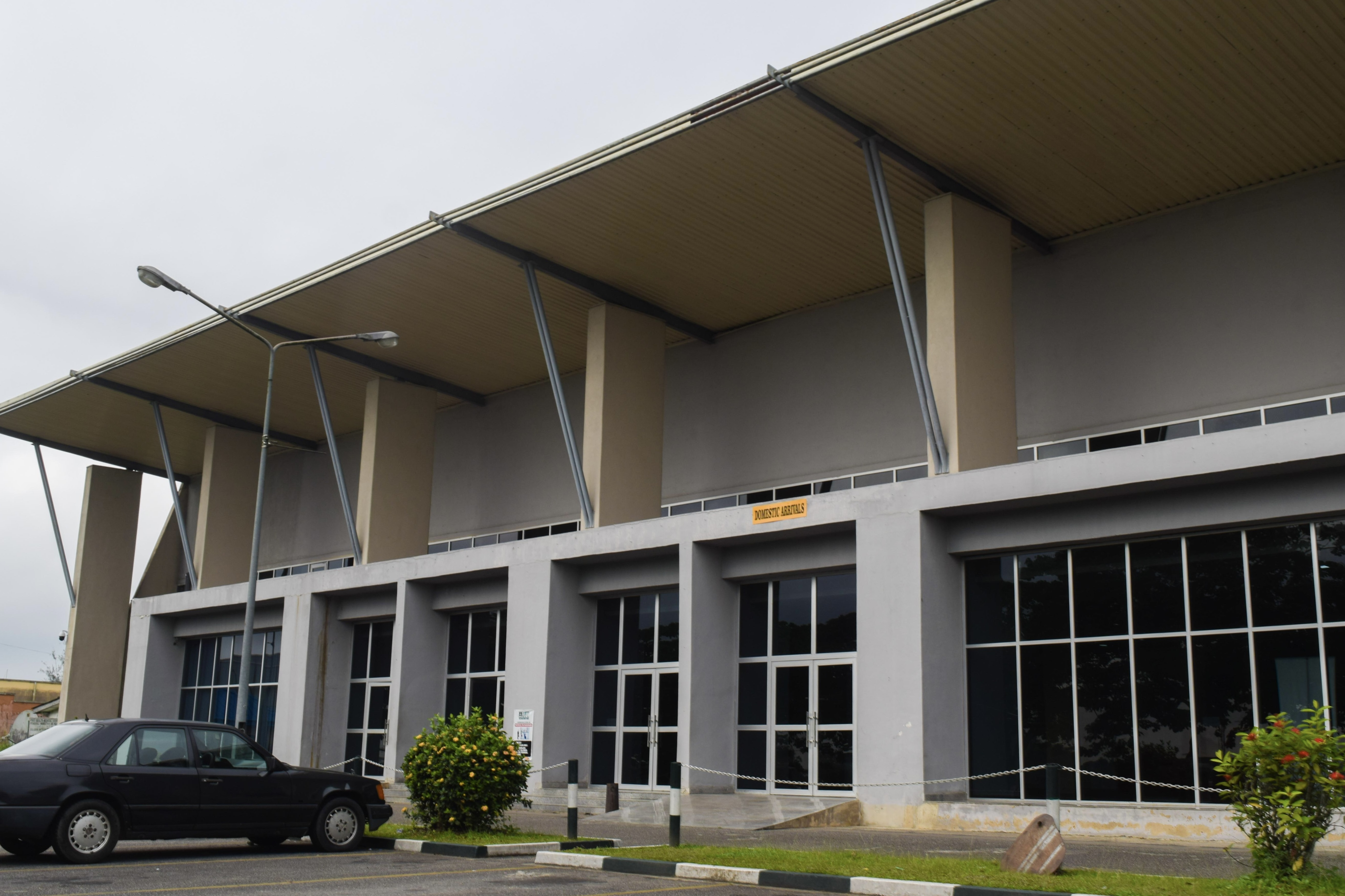
- IATA: CBQ; ICAO: DNCA

Summary
- Airport type: Public
- Owner/Operator: Federal Airports Authority of Nigeria (FAAN)
- Serves: Calabar, Nigeria
- Time zone: WAT (UTC+01:00)
- Elevation AMSL: 210 ft (64 m)
- Coordinates: 4°58′33″N 8°20′50″E

Map
- Location of the airport in Nigeria

Runways
Direction	Length		Surface
Direction	m	ft	Surface
03/21	2,450	8,038	Asphalt

Statistics (2015)
- Passengers: 189,908
- Passenger change 14–15: ▼6.9%
- Sources: FAAN WAD GCM

Margaret Ekpo International Airport (IATA: CBQ, ICAO: DNCA), also known as Calabar Airport, is an airport serving Calabar, the capital of the Cross River State in Nigeria. The airport is named after Margaret Ekpo, who was one of Nigeria's pioneering feminists and anticolonial activists. It was commissioned in 1983 by Alhaji Shehu Shagari, then president of Nigeria.

== Airlines and destinations ==
Airlines	Destinations
Aero Contractors	Abuja, Lagos
Air Peace	Abuja, Lagos
Ibom Air	Abuja, Lagos

== Statistics ==
These data show the number of passengers' movements into the airport, according to the Federal Airports Authority of Nigeria's Aviation Sector Summary Reports.

Year	2005	2006	2007	2008	2009	2010	2011	2012	2013	2014	2015
Passengers	136,153	167,767	207,542	273,586	316,736	281,935	153,068	206,168	198,157	204,036	189,908
Growth (%)	▼4.40%	▲23.22%	▲23.71%	▲31.82%	▲15.77%	▼10.99%	▼45.71%	▲34.69%	▼3.89%	▲2.97%	▼6.92%
Source: Federal Airports Authority of Nigeria (FAAN). Aviation Sector Reports (2010-2013, 2014, Q3-Q4 of 2015, and Q1-Q2 of 2016)

== See also ==
- Transport in Nigeria
- List of airports in Nigeria
- List of the busiest airports in Africa
