= Azman Air =

Airline company in Nigeria

IATA	ICAO	Call sign
ZU	AZM	AZMAN
- Founded: 2010
- Hubs: Mallam Aminu Kano International Airport
- Fleet size: 7
- Destinations: 11
- Headquarters: Kano, Nigeria
- Key people: Abdulmanaf Yunusa Sarina, (President); Faisal Abdulmunaf, (Managing Director); Muhd. Hadi Abdulmunaf, (Accountable Manager)
- Website: www.airazman.com

Azman Air Services Limited is a Nigerian-based domestic airline company. Established in 2010 by businessman Abdulmunaf Yunusa Sarina, the airline operates scheduled domestic passenger services with its main base in Mallam Aminu Kano International Airport, Kano.

== History ==
Azman Air was established in 2010, and began operations in 2014 with its first commercial flight to Nnamdi Azikiwe International Airport, on 15 May 2014 from Kano. The airline began operations in Nigeria with 2 Boeing 737-500 aircraft for its domestic services. In October 2017, Azman Air leased a used Airbus A330 from an Egyptian charter airline (the now defunct Air Leisure) which would be used to fly to international routes to both the Middle East and Asia. The airline has since discontinued leasing the A330, and, as of 8 February 2020, is only flying domestic routes within Nigeria.

== Destinations ==
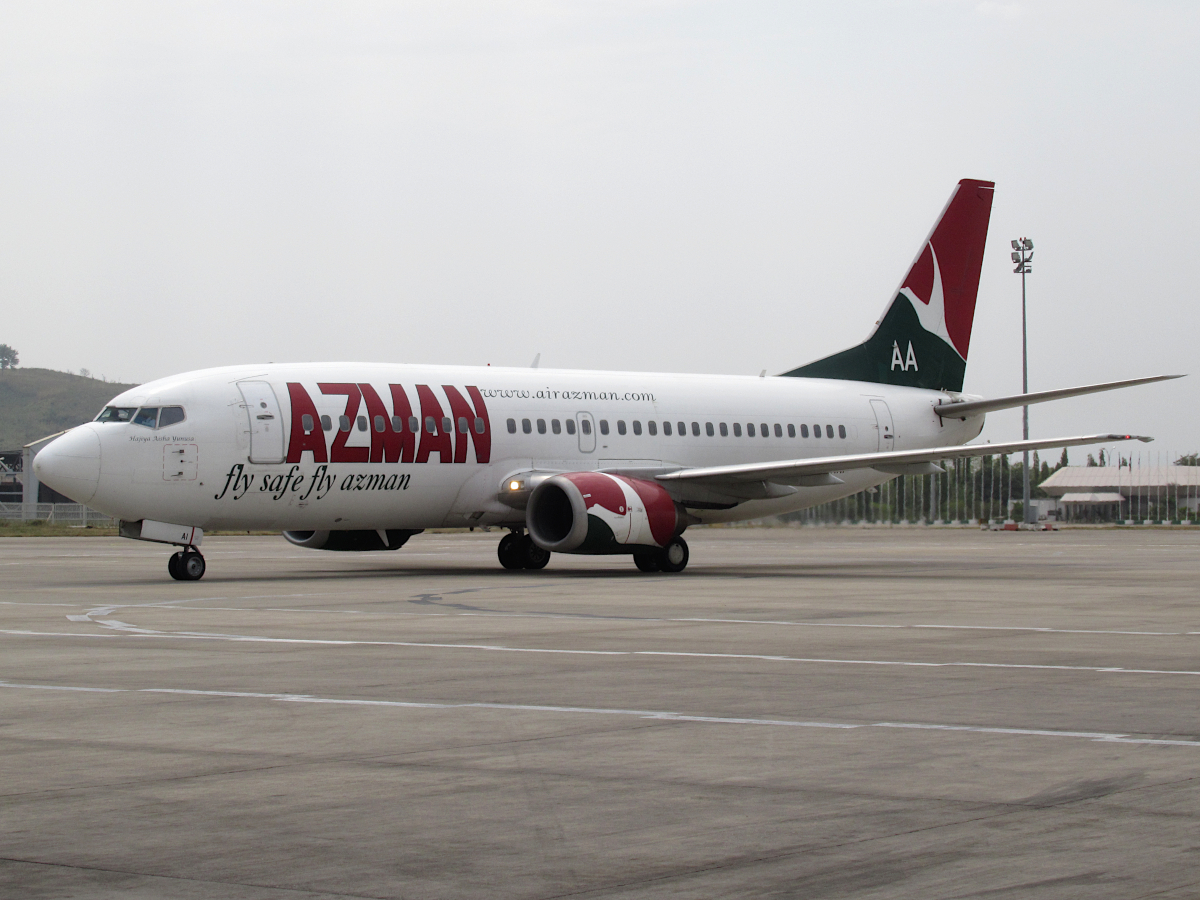
An Azman Air Boeing 737 at Nnamdi Azikiwe International Airport

As of February 2020, Azman Air operates services to the following scheduled destinations:

- Abuja - Nnamdi Azikiwe International Airport
- Asaba - Asaba International Airport
- Benin City - Benin Airport
- Birnin Kebbi - Sir Ahmadu Bello International Airport
- Gombe - Gombe Lawanti International Airport
- Kaduna - Kaduna International Airport
- Kano - Mallam Aminu Kano International Airport Hub
- Lagos - Murtala Muhammed International Airport
- Maiduguri - Maiduguri International Airport
- Owerri - Sam Mbakwe Airport
- Port Harcourt - Port Harcourt International Airport
- Dakar - Blaise Diagne International Airport
- Jeddah - King Abdulaziz International Airport

== Fleet ==
=== Current fleet ===
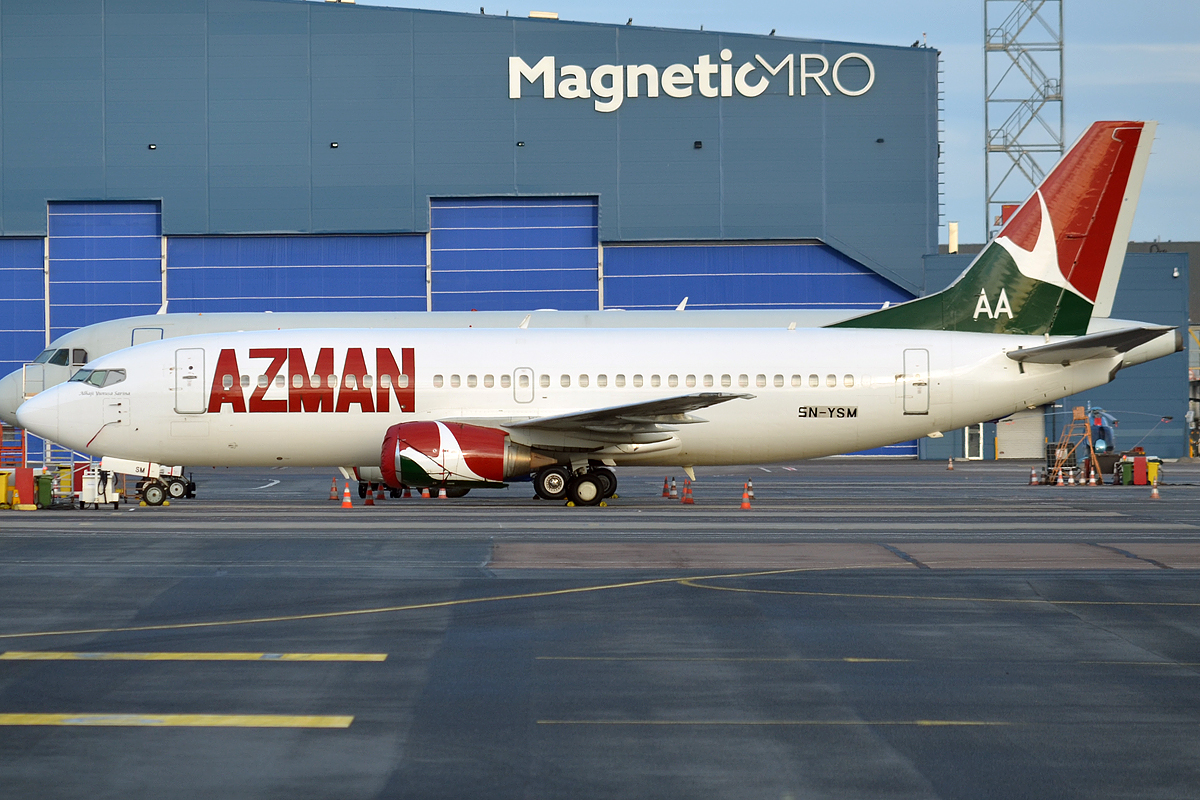
An Azman Air Boeing 737-300 at Tallinn Airport

As of August 2025, Azman Air operates the following aircraft:

Azman Air fleet
Aircraft	In service	Orders	Passengers			Notes
Aircraft	In service	Orders	B	E	Total	Notes
Airbus A340-600	1	—	2	411	413	Ex-Virgin Atlantic aircraft
Boeing 737-300	2	—	—	147	147	
Boeing 737-500	4	—	—	122	122	
Total	7	—				

=== Former fleet ===
In 2017, the airline operated a leased Airbus A330-200.

== In-flight services ==
Azman Air Services Limited launches its first in-flight quarterly magazine titled Fly Safe Magazine on August 15, 2020, The magazine was released after the resumption of domestic operations in Nigeria. It was first sighted in the airline's headquarters as free copies were shared among staff and passengers. Fly Safe Magazine is published by the Nigerian company Zamkah Technologies Limited.

== Incidents and accidents ==
On 17 February 2021, Azman Air Boeing 737-500 with registration number 5N-SYS named Sani Yunusa Sarina with over 100 passengers coming from Abuja suffered a burst tyre on landing at Murtala Muhammed International Airport in Lagos. No casualties were reported.

== Suspension from service ==
On 17 March 2021, the management of Azman Air announced the suspension of its flight services to all destinations in Nigeria. According to the Nigerian Civil Aviation Authority (NCAA), the suspension was to enable the regulatory authority to conduct an audit of the airline to determine the root causes of the previous incidents to the airline and recommend corrective actions.
