= Max Air =

Airline company in Nigeria

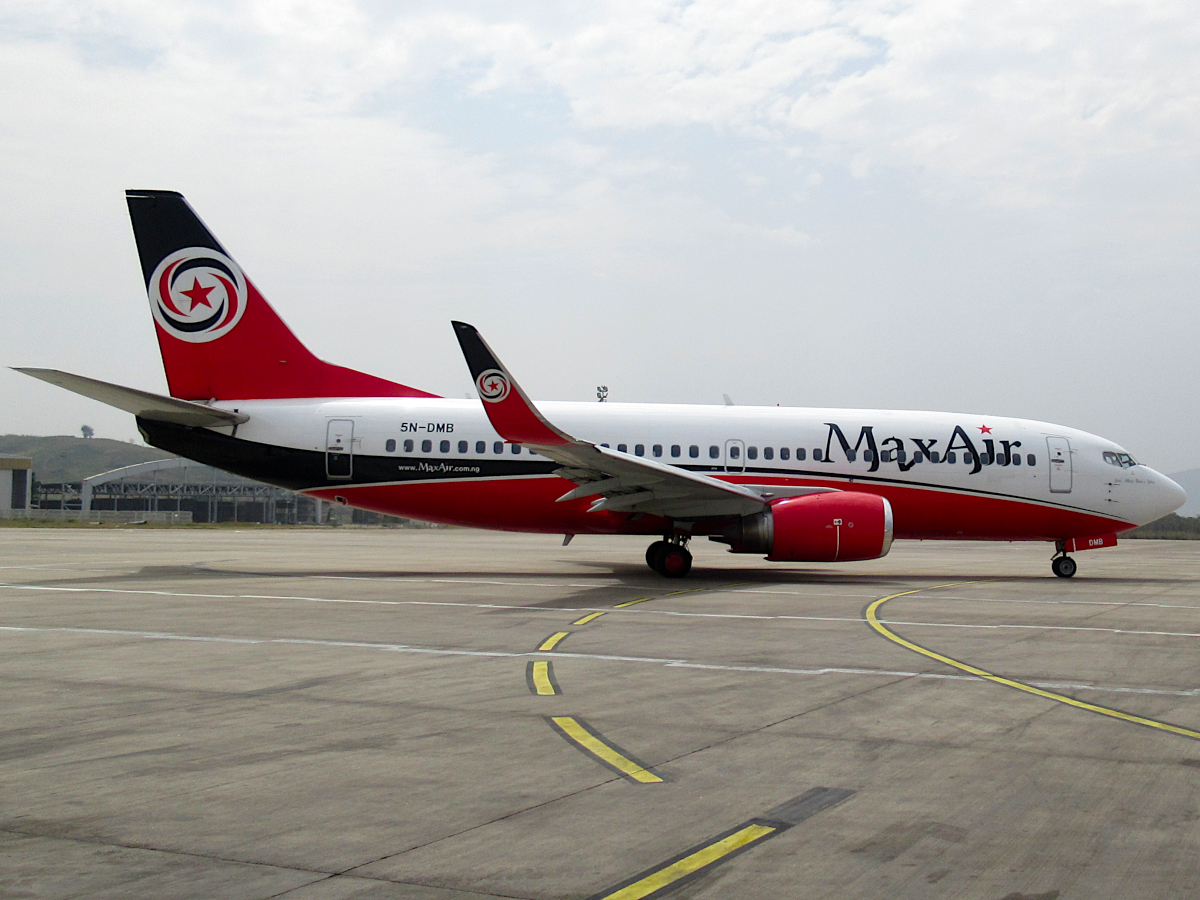
- Max Air 737-300
IATA	ICAO	Call sign
VM	NGL	MAXAIR NIGERIA
- Founded: 2008; 18 years ago
- Hubs: Mallam Aminu Kano International Airport
- Fleet size: 10
- Destinations: 12
- Headquarters: Kano, Nigeria
- Key people: Alhaji Dahiru Barau Mangal (Chairman)
- Website: maxair.com.ng

Max Air is a Nigerian airline operating domestic and international flights. Established in 2008 by Alhaji Dahiru Barau Mangal, the company's head office is located in Kano State with its base at Mallam Aminu Kano International Airport, Kano.

== History ==
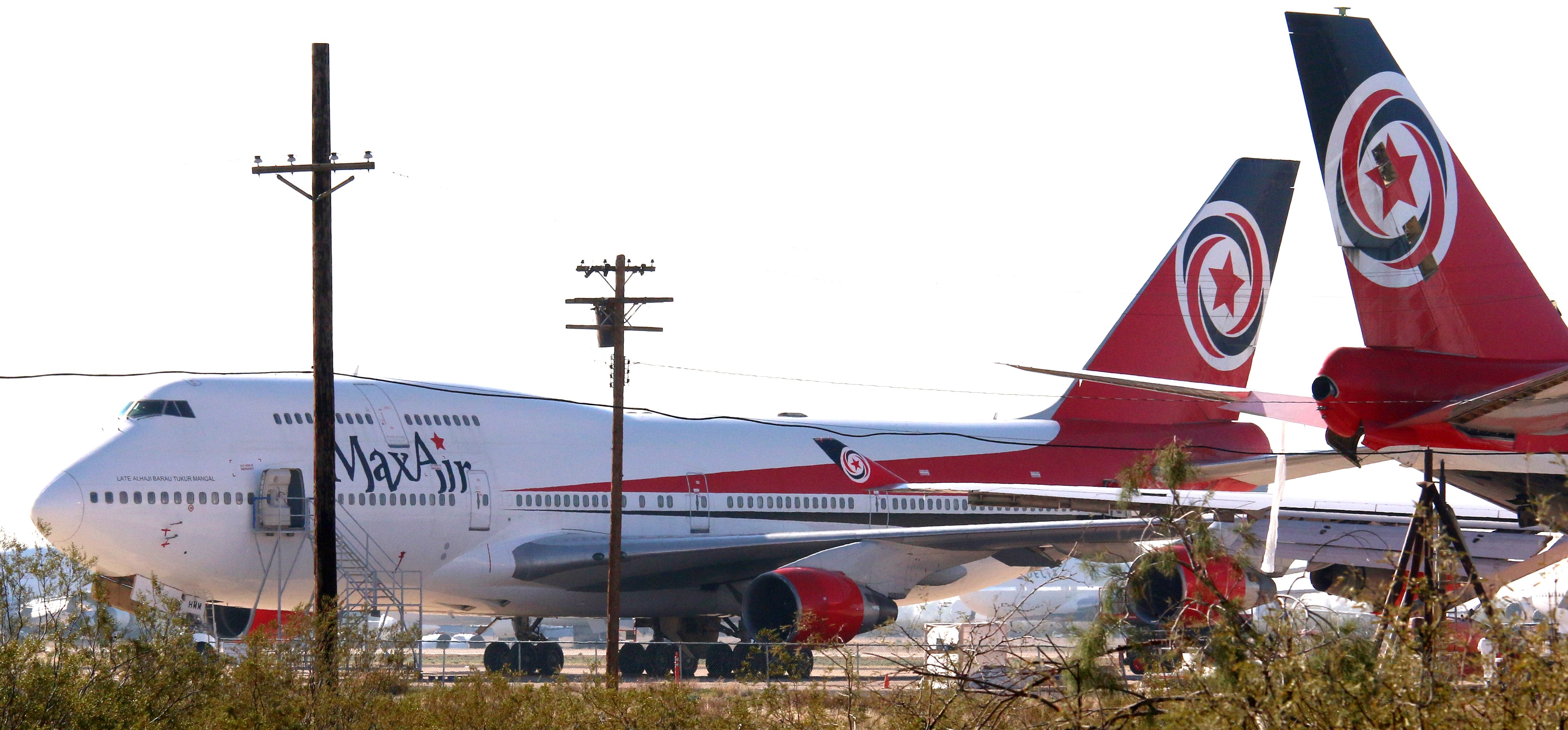
Both Max Air Boeing 747-400s stored at Pinal Airpark in 2021.

Max Air is one of Nigeria's airlines, operating a domestic, regional and international flight network. The airline was established in 2006 as Mangal Airlines and rebranded Max Air in 2008 operating its first commercial flight to King Abdulaziz International Airport from Kano. The airline began its operations with two Boeing 747-400 aircraft for its Umrah and Hajj operation services.

In June 2018, Max Air began domestic operations to Abuja and Lagos from the airline's main hub, Kano. On November 1, 2018, Max Air announced two new routes to its domestic operations which include Port Harcourt and Yola as part of its expansion drive. On November 5, Maiduguri route was launched by the airline, making it the 6th domestic destination to its operational routes.

On July 11, 2019, Max Air became the first Nigerian airline to have an in-flight magazine on its domestic routes published by In-flight Media and Technologies Limited, which is a part of Zamkah Technologies Limited company.

In 2023, an audit exposed severe safety violations by Max Airline, leading to a Nigerian Civil Aviation Authority (NCAA) suspension. Over 28 critical safety issues were identified within the airline's fleet, including altered records submission and neglect of necessary replacements. Discrepancies in landing gear airworthiness and maintenance personnel certification were evident. The audit highlighted deficient safety directives management and unauthorized personnel performing crucial tasks.

== Destinations ==
As of August 2019, Max Air is operating in seven domestic and 2 international scheduled destinations in states across Nigeria and the Middle East:

Hub
Future
Terminated route
Suspended route

City	Country	IATA	ICAO	Airport	Refs
Abuja	Nigeria	ABV	DNAA	Nnamdi Azikiwe International Airport	
Bauchi	Nigeria	BCU	DNBC	Bauchi State Airport	
Benin City	Nigeria	BNI	DNBE	Benin Airport	
Jeddah	Saudi Arabia	JED	OEJN	King Abdulaziz International Airport	
Kano	Nigeria	KAN	DNKN	Mallam Aminu Kano International Airport	
Katsina	Nigeria	DKA	DNKT	Umaru Musa Yar'adua Airport	
Lagos	Nigeria	LOS	DNMM	Murtala Muhammed International Airport	
Medina	Saudi Arabia	MED	OEMA	Prince Mohammad bin Abdulaziz International Airport	
Maiduguri	Nigeria	MIU	DNMA	Maiduguri International	
Owerri	Nigeria	QOW	DNIM	Sam Mbakwe Airport	
Port Harcourt	Nigeria	PHC	DNPO	Port Harcourt International Airport	
Sokoto	Nigeria	SKO	DNSO	Sadiq Abubakar III International Airport	
Yola	Nigeria	YOL	DNYO	Yola Airport	

== Fleet ==
As of August 2025, Max Air operates the following aircraft:

MaxAir fleet
Aircraft	Active	Orders	Notes
Boeing 737-300	5	—	4 stored
Boeing 737-400	1	—	
Boeing 747-400	3	—	
Boeing 777-200	1	—	
Total	10	—	

=== Former fleet ===
- Boeing 747-300

== Accidents and incidents ==
- On May 7, 2023, a 737-400 experienced a landing incident at Nnamdi Azikiwe International Airport in Abuja due to a tire burst. While concluding its Yola to Abuja journey, the aircraft, registered as 5N-MBD, safely evacuated all 143 passengers and an infant with no injuries, although the aircraft was destroyed. Swift response from emergency services ensured passenger safety and comfort, prompting subsequent flight cancellations at the Abuja airport. Investigations into the tire burst's cause were initiated by the Nigeria Safety Investigation Bureau (NSIB).
