= Dahiru Mangal =

Nigerian businessman (born 1957)

- Born: Dahiru Barau Mangal; August 3, 1957 (age 68); Katsina, Katsina State
- Occupation: Businessman
- Years active: 2008 to date
- Known for: Max Air
- Notable work: Airline, transportation and construction

Dahiru Barau Mangal thumb CON (born August 3, 1957) is a Nigerian businessman. He founded Max Air in 2008. He is recognized for his involvement in the transportation industry, oil and gas, and manufacturing.

== Early life ==
Dahiru Barau Mangal was born in Katsina State to the family of Alhaji Barau Mangal. He grew up with his siblings Alhaji Bashir Barau Mangal, Alhaji Hamza Barau Mangal, Hajiya Zulai Barau Mangal, Hajiya Yar Goje and his Mother Hajiya Murjanatu Barau Mangal in Katsina. He later started as a truck driver and eventually went on to buy his own car for hire.

== Career ==
Mangal is the founder of Max Air, one of Nigeria's leading airline operating a domestic, regional and international flight network. His other investments includes transportation, oil and gas and construction. He was a Non — Executive Director of MRS Oil Nigeria Plc until November 17, 2017, when he resigned.

He is a major shareholder in Oando Plc where he had a conflict with the firm's management that led to the suspension of Oando's trading on both the Lagos and Johannesburg stock exchanges. The conflict arose in 2017 when Mangal and a Gabriel Volpi controlled shell company wrote a petition to the Nigerian Securities Exchange Commission alleging financial mismanagement by Oando's management prompting an audit by the commission into the matter including possible insider trading. The conflict was resolved by the intervention of Emir of Kano, Lamido Sanusi in January 2018.

== Philanthropy ==
Mangal is a renowned philanthropist offering help and support to students, people with disabilities and internally displaced persons affected by conflict in Nigeria. He also distributes food in the northern part of Nigeria including Katsina, Kano, Kaduna and villages on daily basis.

== Construction Of $600m Cement Plant In Kogi ==
On 4 November 2021, Mangal Industries signed an agreement with a Chinese firm, Sinoma, for the construction of a three million metric tons per year Cement Plant and 50 megawatts captive power plant in Mopa, Kogi State. The project is expected to be completed in early 2024. Chief Executive of Mangal, Engr. Fahad Mangal, in a statement, noted that the total project cost is approximately $600 million. According to him, the investment is part of an ambitious investment program under implementation by Mangal Industries Limited. “The factory will rely on best available technology for cement production and in line with highest environmental standards. It is designed to be one of the most sustainable in the sector. “Mangal is investing strategically in the West African Cement Industry to enable the Nigerian economy to bridge the huge infrastructure and housing deficit in the largest economy of the region,” he said. He further noted that the investment reinforces Mangal's commitment to Nigeria's infrastructural and economic development and reflects its confidence in the favorable outlook of the economy in the country and the region.

In July 2024, Mangal Cement successfully produced its first bags of cement.
