= United Nigeria Airlines =

Nigerian airline

IATA	ICAO	Call sign
U5	UNA	UNITED NIGERIA
- Founded: 2020
- Operating bases: Enugu International Airport
- Focus cities: Abuja, Lagos
- Fleet size: 5
- Destinations: 9
- Parent company: United Nigeria Airlines Limited
- Headquarters: Enugu
- Key people: Prof. Obiorah Okonkwo (Chairman), Adedayo Olawuyi (CCO)
- Website: flyunitednigeria.com

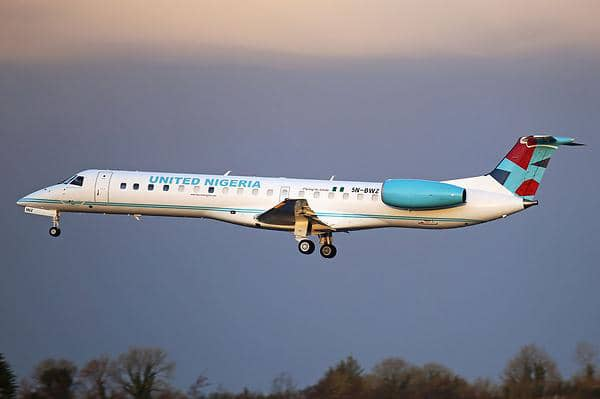
United Nigeria Airlines ERJ-145

United Nigeria Airlines Limited, trading as United Nigeria Airlines (IATA: U5, ICAO: UNA), is a private airline in Nigeria. The new start-up received its Air Operators Certificate (AOC) on 1 February 2021. Headquartered in the city of Enugu, with an office in Abuja, and with its operations base at Enugu International Airport, United Nigeria Airlines started with four aircraft to operate scheduled flights between nine Nigerian cities: Abuja, Onitsha, Asaba, Yenagoa, Warri, Enugu, Owerri, Lagos, and Port Harcourt.

== Overview ==
United Nigeria Airlines was established in 2020. It is a wholly owned subsidiary of United Nigeria Airlines Limited, a Nigerian company affiliated with Obiorah Okonkwo, a Russian-trained political scientist, businessman and entrepreneur.

The airline took delivery of four 50-seater Embraer ERJ-145LR aircraft during the second half of 2020. After rigorous examination by the Nigerian Civil Aviation Authority (NCAA), which included test flights, NCAA granted the airline an AOC on 1 February 2021. The initial AOC was valid until 31 January 2023.

On 12 February 2021, United Nigeria Airlines made its inaugural flight from Murtala Muhammed International Airport, Lagos State, to Akanu Ibiam International Airport, Enugu State. The flight had a 100 percent passenger load factor.

== Destinations ==
As of November 2025, United Nigeria Airlines maintains regular scheduled services to the following destinations:

Country	City	Airport	Notes	Refs
Nigeria	Abuja	Nnamdi Azikiwe International Airport		
Nigeria	Asaba	Asaba International Airport		
Nigeria	Enugu	Akanu Ibiam International Airport	Hub	
Nigeria	Owerri	Sam Mbakwe International Cargo Airport		
Nigeria	Yenagoa	Bayelsa International Airport		
Nigeria	Umuleri	Anambra International Cargo Airport		
Nigeria	Lagos	Murtala Muhammed International Airport		
Nigeria	Katsina	Katsina Airport		
Nigeria	Osubi	Warri Airport		
Nigeria	Port Harcourt	Port Harcourt International Airport		
Ghana	Accra	Kotoka International Airport		

== Fleet ==
As of August 2025, United Nigeria Airlines operates the following aircraft:

United Nigeria Airlines fleet
Aircraft	In fleet	Order	Passengers	Notes
Boeing 737-500	1			
Embraer ERJ-145LR	4		50	
Total	5			

== Incidents and accidents ==
- On 17 November 2021, a United Nigeria Embraer 145 with 43 passengers and four crew, flying from Nnamdi Azikiwe International Airport to Murtala Muhammad International Airport, reported hearing two loud explosions followed by an engine flameout after departure. The crew declared an emergency and returned safely to Abuja on a single engine. The preliminary investigation by the Accident Investigation Bureau (Nigeria) revealed that the flight data recorder had been disabled and did not record the incident on the flight.

== See also ==
- Airlines of Africa
- List of airlines of Nigeria
