= Sir Ahmadu Bello International Airport =

Sir Ahmadu Bello International Airport (SABIA)
- IATA: none; ICAO: DNBK

Summary
- Airport type: Public
- Operator: Kebbi State
- Serves: Birnin Kebbi
- Elevation AMSL: 775 ft (236 m)
- Coordinates: 12°28′50″N 4°22′10″E
- Website: http://kebbi.aviationportal.com.ng/

Map
- Location of the airport in Nigeria

Runways
Direction	Length		Surface
Direction	m	ft	Surface
06/24	3,100	10,171	Asphalt
- Source: GCM

Sir Ahmadu Bello International Airport (SABIA) (ICAO: DNBK) is an airport serving Birnin Kebbi in the Kebbi State of Nigeria. It is located at Ambursa, 16 kilometres (9.9 mi) east of Birnin Kebbi, along the Birnin Kebbi-Argungu road.

The runway was extended from its original 2,200 metres (7,200 ft) to 3,100 metres (10,200 ft) and had a new ramp and terminal built in 2013. The Birnin Kebbi DVOR-DME (Ident: BIK) is located on the field. Also Instrument Landing System (ILS) Localiser (ident IRK ) and Glideslope is installed at runway 06.

The airport started full operations in 2014, and since then Muslim pilgrims from Kebbi State have been flown from SABIA to Jedda International Airport in Saudi Arabia. The airport also has scheduled and unscheduled domestic flights. The scheduled flights to Abuja were via Airpeace before Azman Air, which is currently the major airline operating from SABIA.

== See also ==
- Transport in Nigeria
- List of airports in Nigeria
