= Battle of Maiduguri (2013) =

- Part of Boko Haram insurgency
Date	2 December 2013
Location	Maiduguri International Airport and other areas, Maiduguri, Borno State, Nigeria
Result	Nigerian victory

Belligerents
Nigeria	Boko Haram

Commanders and leaders
Unknown	Abubakar Shekau

Strength
Unknown	200

Casualties and losses
2+ injured (per Nigeria)	24+ killed (per Nigeria)
- Dozens of civilians killed

On 2 December 2013, Boko Haram militants raided the city of Maiduguri, attacking the Maiduguri International Airport and several other sites within the city.

== Background ==
Boko Haram emerged in 2009 as a jihadist social and political movement in a failed rebellion in northeast Nigeria. Throughout the following years, Abubakar Shekau unified militant Islamist groups in the region and continued to foment the rebellion against the Nigerian government, conducting terrorist attacks and bombings in cities and communities across the region. Maiduguri, the capital of Borno State, had been attacked several times by the militants due to being the largest city in northeast Nigeria. In 2009, over 1,000 civilians were killed in Boko Haram attacks on the city.

== Battle ==
At 3am on the night between 1 and 2 December 2013, around 200 Boko Haram militants attacked a Nigerian air and ground military base near the Maiduguri Airport. Several other police and military posts in the city were targeted as well. The attackers also set fire to shops and gas stations on the outskirts of the city. Nigerian officials said that at least 24 militants were killed in the attack, along with an unknown number of civilians. Three planes and two helicopters were destroyed during fighting at the airport. Two air force personnel were injured as well. Locals reported that bodies were in the streets with their throats slit, and several buildings had been razed by bombings.

Following the battle, the attackers retreated eastward. The Nigerian military then cut off all contact between Maiduguri and the rest of the world for 24 hours, severing telephone lines. Abubakar Shekau claimed responsibility for the attack on 12 December.

== Aftermath ==
On 14 January 2014, over thirty people were killed by a car bomb planted by Boko Haram in Maiduguri.
