= Bauchi State Airport =

Bauchi State International Airport
- IATA: BCU; ICAO: DNBC

Summary
- Airport type: Public
- Serves: Bauchi
- Time zone: WAT (UTC+01:00)
- Elevation AMSL: 1,965 ft (599 m)
- Coordinates: 10°29′00″N 9°44′40″E

Map
- Location of the airport in Nigeria

Runways
Direction	Length		Surface
Direction	m	ft	Surface
17/35	3,400	11,155	Asphalt
- Source: GCM Google Maps SkyVector

The Sir Abubakar Tafawa Balewa Bauchi State International Airport (IATA: BCU, ICAO: DNBC) is a new airport serving the city of Bauchi, the capital of Bauchi State, Nigeria. It is named after Sir Abubakar Tafawa Balewa, who was Prime Minister of Nigeria from 1957 to 1966. The airport is 22 kilometres (14 mi) northwest of Bauchi.

The airport was constructed in 18 months to replace the in-town Bauchi Airport, and has scheduled airline service. A cargo terminal is also planned.

The BU non-directional beacon (Ident: BU) and Bauchi VOR-DME (Ident: BCH) are located on the field.

It was established in 2014 by Governor Isa Yuguda to further help with the tourism of the state in Nigeria.

== Runway ==
Bauchi Airport has one runway. Its surface is waxed with asphalt to enhance steep pressure on the runway which is also enlighted.

=== Hub ===
Bauchi Airport is a hub for Overland Airways and Arik Airways, these airlines have one of the largest swifts in the aviation industry. Because the aircraft is in a better condition, they are fit for commercial services.

==== Terminals ====
Bauchi Airport has one terminal. The airport terminal is well-equipped with modern facilities. Since its completion, the terminal has been in good condition in an interview the state government hinted at expanding the airport in order to achieve this, the government have hinted on building a cargo terminal.

== Airlines and destinations ==
Bauchi Airport currently handles flights to Abuja

Airlines	Destinations
Aero Contractors	Abuja
Arik Air	Abuja
Max Air	Abuja
Overland Airways	Abuja
ValueJet	Abuja

== See also ==
- Transport in Nigeria
- List of airports in Nigeria
