= Brigadier Zakari Maimalari Airport =

Airport in Gombe State, Nigeria

Brig. Zakari Maimalari Airport, Gombe
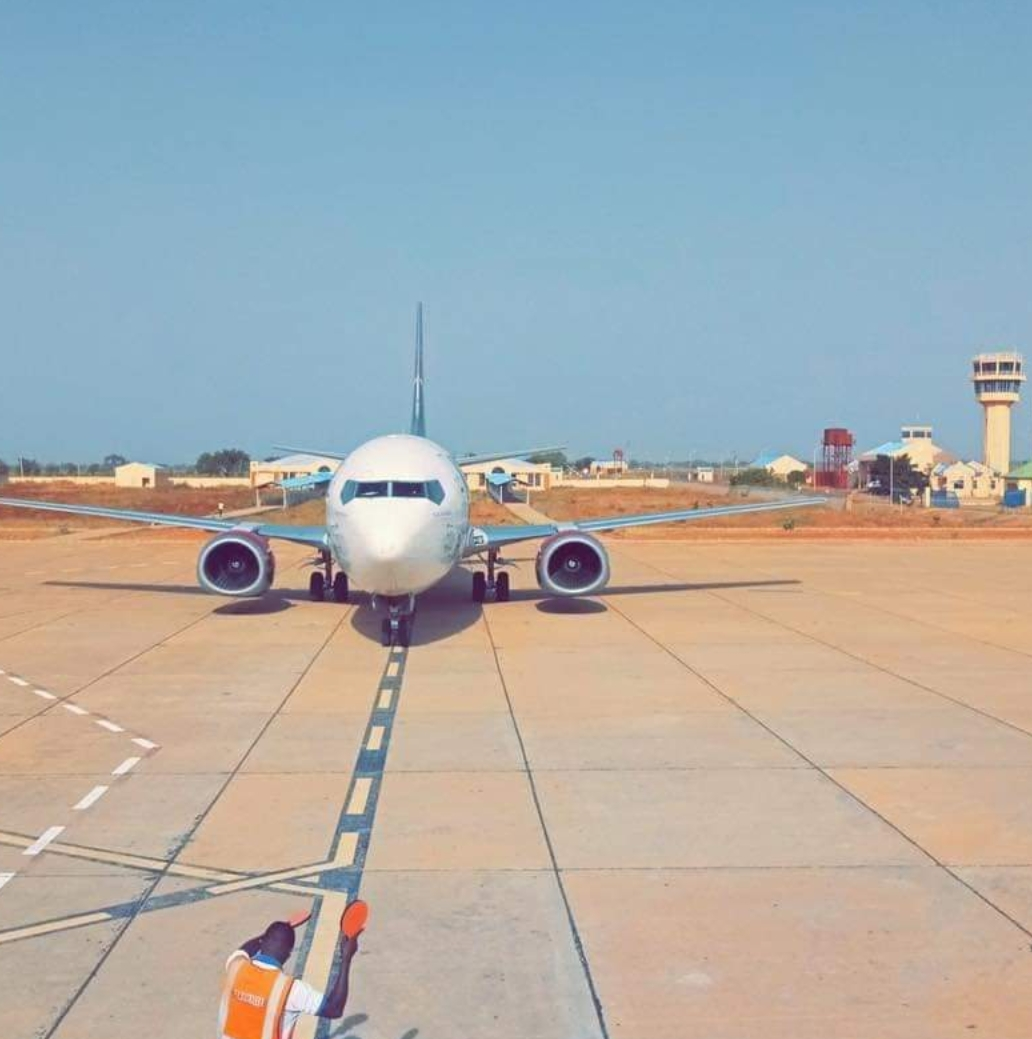
- IATA: GMO; ICAO: DNGO

Summary
- Airport type: Public
- Owner/Operator: Federal Airports Authority of Nigeria (FAAN)
- Serves: Gombe, Nigeria
- Time zone: WAT (UTC+01:00)
- Elevation AMSL: 480 m (1,570 ft)
- Coordinates: 10°17′56″N 10°54′00″E

Map
- Location of Airport in Nigeria

Runways
Direction	Length		Surface
Direction	m	ft	Surface
			Asphalt
- Sources: FAAN and DAFIF

Brigadier Zakari Maimalari Airport (IATA: GMO, ICAO: DNGO) is the airport that serves Gombe, the capital of Gombe State, Nigeria. Gombe Lawanti International Airport got its name because of its nearness to Lawanti which is a small village in Gombe State, Nigeria. It was built along the Bauchi to Gombe road in Akko Local Government Area, Gombe. The federal government began the Planning in 2005 and it was launched for flights in 2008, it was developed for the public for domestic and commercial services. The first International flight was en route Jeddah, Saudi Arabia. Since then the Gombe Lawanti International Airport has recorded high air-passenger traffic. Gombe International Airport has a standard runway paved with asphalt, to allow commercial operations at night. Even runway lighting has been installed, it also has an elevation of 480 metres (1,590 feet). Gombe International Airport Lawanti is 3.5 km (2.2 mi) long and can accommodate cargo planes.

== Services ==
Brigadier Zakari Maimalari Airport is the center of activity for Arik Air, Azman Air, Overland Airways and Air Peace currently the airport handles domestic flights to Abuja of Nigeria.

== Features ==
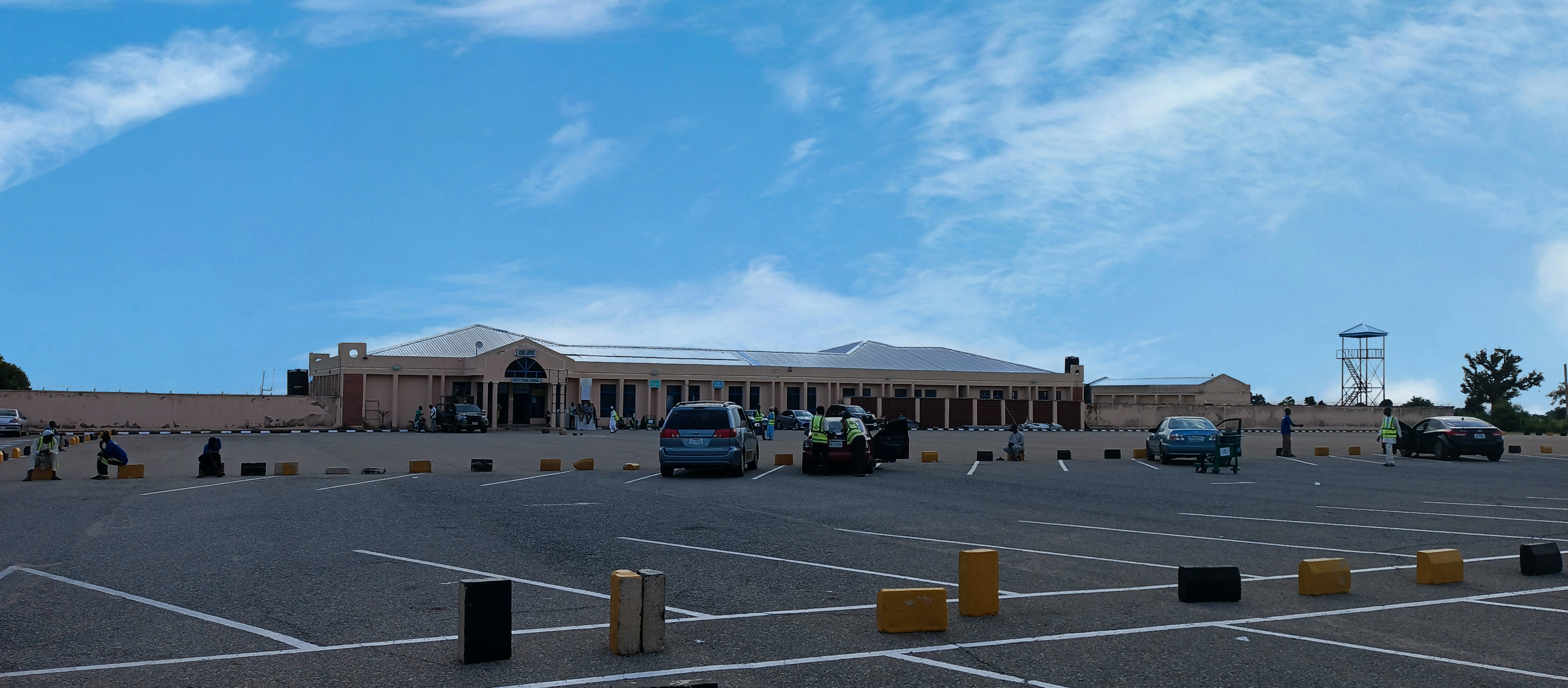
Terminal building of Brig. Zakaria Maimalari Airport

- Terminal
- Presence of runway edge light
- Standard runway
- Hub for the largest airline in Nigeria (Arik Air)

== Airlines and destinations ==
Airlines	Destinations
Air Peace	Abuja
Arik Air	Abuja
Azman Air	Abuja
Overland Airways	Abuja

== Federal Government's Takeover of the Airport ==
In September 2022, then-Nigerian President Muhammadu Buhari granted approval for the takeover of the Gombe Lawanti International Airport by the Federal Government of Nigeria. The information was disclosed after the meeting the Gombe State governor, Muhammad Inuwa Yahaya had with Buhari in his office at the Presidential Villa, Abuja.
