= 2022 Caverton Helicopters DHC-6 crash =

2022 aviation accident in Cameroon

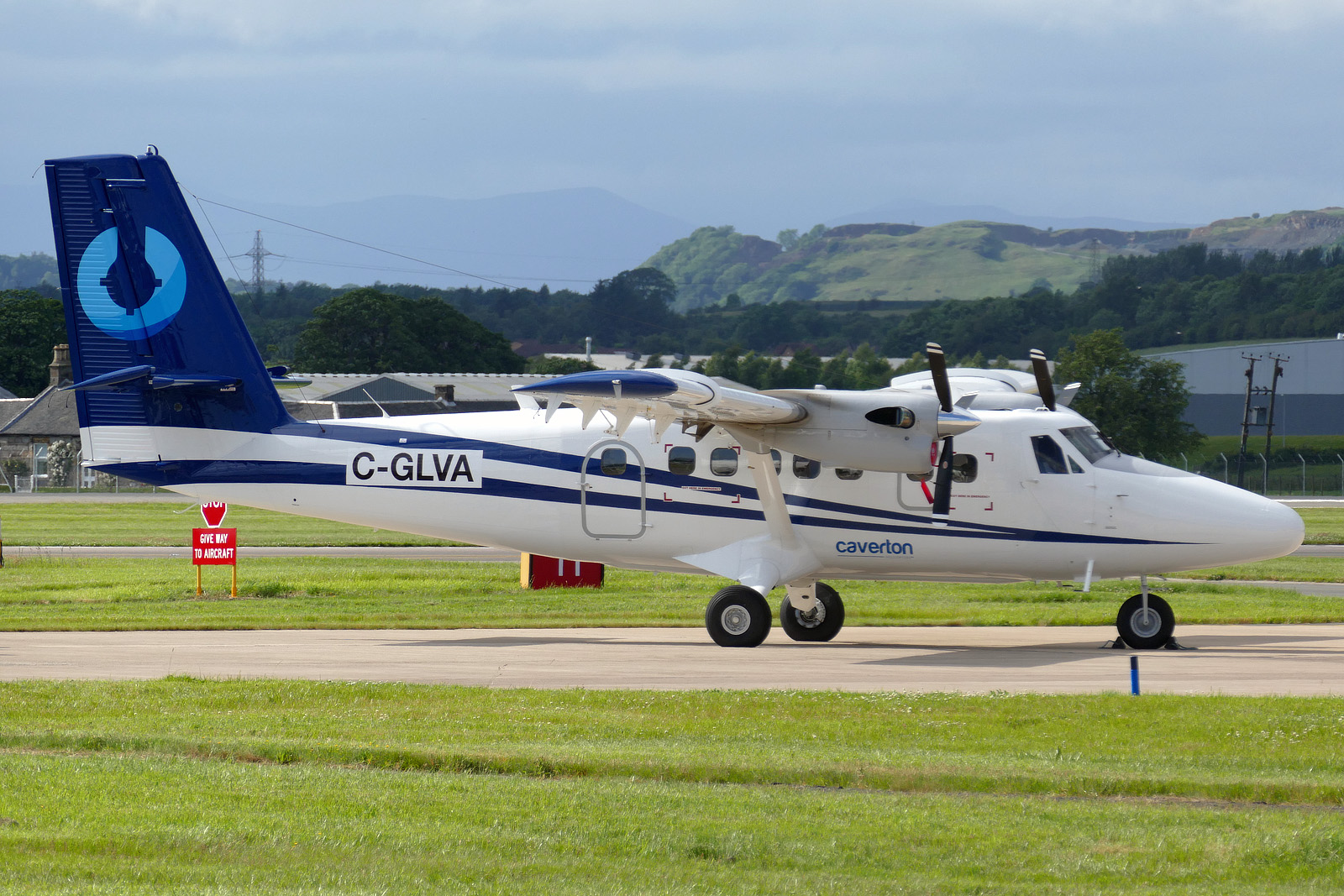
- The aircraft involved under a previous registration in 2017

Accident
- Date: 11 May 2022
- Summary: Crashed in a forest during cruise
- Site: Near Nanga Eboko, Centre Region, Cameroon; 4°38′55″N 12°21′19″E

Aircraft
- Aircraft type: Viking Air DHC-6 Twin Otter 400
- Operator: Caverton Helicopters, operated on beahlf of the Cameroon Oil Transportation Company
- Registration: TJ-TIM
- Flight origin: Yaoundé Nsimalen International Airport, Centre Region, Cameroon
- 1st stopover: Dompta Airport, North Region, Cameroon
- Destination: Bélabo Airport, East Region, Cameroon
- Occupants: 11
- Passengers: 9
- Crew: 2
- Fatalities: 11
- Survivors: 0

On 11 May, 2022, a Caverton Helicopters Viking Air DHC-6 Twin Otter 400, operating a domestic charter flight in Cameroon from Yaoundé Nsimalen International Airport, Centre Region, to Bélabo Airport, East Region, with a stopover in Dompta Airport, North Region, crashed near the town of Nanga Eboko. All 11 people on board were killed. The accident is the first major one in Cameroon since the 2007 crash of Kenya Airways Flight 507.

== Background ==
=== Aircraft ===
The aircraft involved was a Viking Air DHC-6 Twin Otter 400, registered as TJ-TIM and manufactured in 2015. It was owned by Caverton Helicopters and operating a charter flight on behalf of Cameroon Oil Transportation Company (COTCO).

=== Passengers and crew ===
The aircraft was carrying 11 occupants, two crew members and nine passengers, all of which were COTCO employees. The occupants were from Cameroon and Nigeria.

== Accident ==
The aircraft initially took off from Yaoundé Nsimalen International Airport, Centre Region, headed for Dompta Airport, North Region, but it was forced to turn back shortly after departure. After an hour and fifteen minutes the aircraft took off again and begun its flight. At around 2 pm local time, during cruise, contact with the aircraft was lost, and it was declared missing.

=== Search and rescue ===
Aerial and ground search for the missing aircraft were launched, and soon after it was found crashed in the middle of the rainforest, near the town of Nanga Eboko. Firefighting squads were sent to the crash scene, but they had to cut a path through the woods to reach it, given its remoteness. They worked for hours at the site, but ultimately confirmed that all 11 people on board were killed.

== Investigation ==
After the crash cameroonian authorities launched an investigation. The two flight recorders were recovered, but the cockpit voice recorder was substantially damagend, so it was sent to Canada for further analysis. During an interview, released in August 2022, regarding the state of the investigation, the cameroonian transport minister, Jean Ernest Masséna Ngalle Bibehe, stated that a mechanical failure was excluded by the investigators, that were now focusing on weather conditions, which were adverse at the time, and human error. The state of the investigation as of 2026 in unknown.

Akin Olateru, the chief of the Nigerian AIB-N agency, that was taking part to the investigation due to the presence of nigerians on board the plane, decided to create an accident investigation unit, together with some nigerian airlines, after the crash. The unit's goal was to improve air safety from things that will be learned during the investigation of this accident. Also cameroonian authorities were said to be pondering the decision to whatever cede completely or not the investigation to nigerian authorities.

== Aftermath ==
Controversies arose around the identification of the bodies of the victims, and their restitution to the families. The management of this situation by Cameroon's Government was deemed inadequate and disorganized. The bodies were eventually given back to the families, and then buried, on 23 November 2022. Problems also occurred during the process for the compensation offered by COTCO to the victims' families.
