= Kingdom Osayi =

Ugandan footballer (born 2004)

Personal information
- Date of birth: 3 June 2004 (age 22)
- Place of birth: Lagos, Nigeria
- Height: 1.98 m (6 ft 6 in)
- Position: Goalkeeper

Team information
- Current team: Assyriska
- Number: 40

Senior career*
| Years | Team | Apps | (Gls) |
| –2018 | Heartland | | |
| 2018–2019 | Giant Brillers | | |
| 2019–2022 | MFM | 29 | (0) |
| 2023–2024 | Doma United | 46 | (0) |
| 2024–2025 | Rangers International | 3 | (0) |
| 2025– | Assyriska | 40 | (0) |

International career^{‡}
| 2026– | Uganda | 2 | (0) |
- * Club domestic league appearances and goals as of 16 November 2026 ‡ National team caps and goals as of 15 November 2026

Kingdom Osayi (born 3 June 2004) is a professional footballer who plays as a goalkeeper for Ettan Fotboll club Assyriska. Born in Nigeria, he plays for the Uganda national team. Osayi formerly played for Mountain of fire Football Club Lagos Nigeria before moving to Doma United F.C. later played for Enugu Rangers international FC 2024/2025 football season in the Nigeria professional Football league before moving abroad. He has now joined a Swedish outfit Assyriska FF a 3rd division side from Enugu Rangers international

== Club career ==
Osayi started his career from FC Heartland and moved on a free transfer to Giant Brillers in the 2019/2020 season. In the 2020/2021 season, he moved on a free transfer to Mountain of Fire and Miracle FC. In 2022/2023, he joined Doma United, and in the 2023/2024 season, he extended his contract to 2024. and currently with The defending champion Enugu Rangers international FC until the end of 2025 Kingdom. Osayi has now signed with A Swedish outfit Assyriska football club södertalje Sweden who plays in the 3rd tier division in Sweden

== International carrer ==
Osayi was part of the Nigeria national under-23 team squad at the 2019 U-23 Africa Cup of Nations, but was not fielded. Since Federation of Uganda Football Associations maintains that his maternal grandmother was born in Kaberamaido, he made his debut for the Uganda national team on 5 October 2026.
