= Katsina Airport =

Airport in northern Nigeria

Umaru Musa Yar'adua Airport, Katsina Filin Jirgin Sama Na Umaru Musa Yar'adua, Katsina (Hausa)
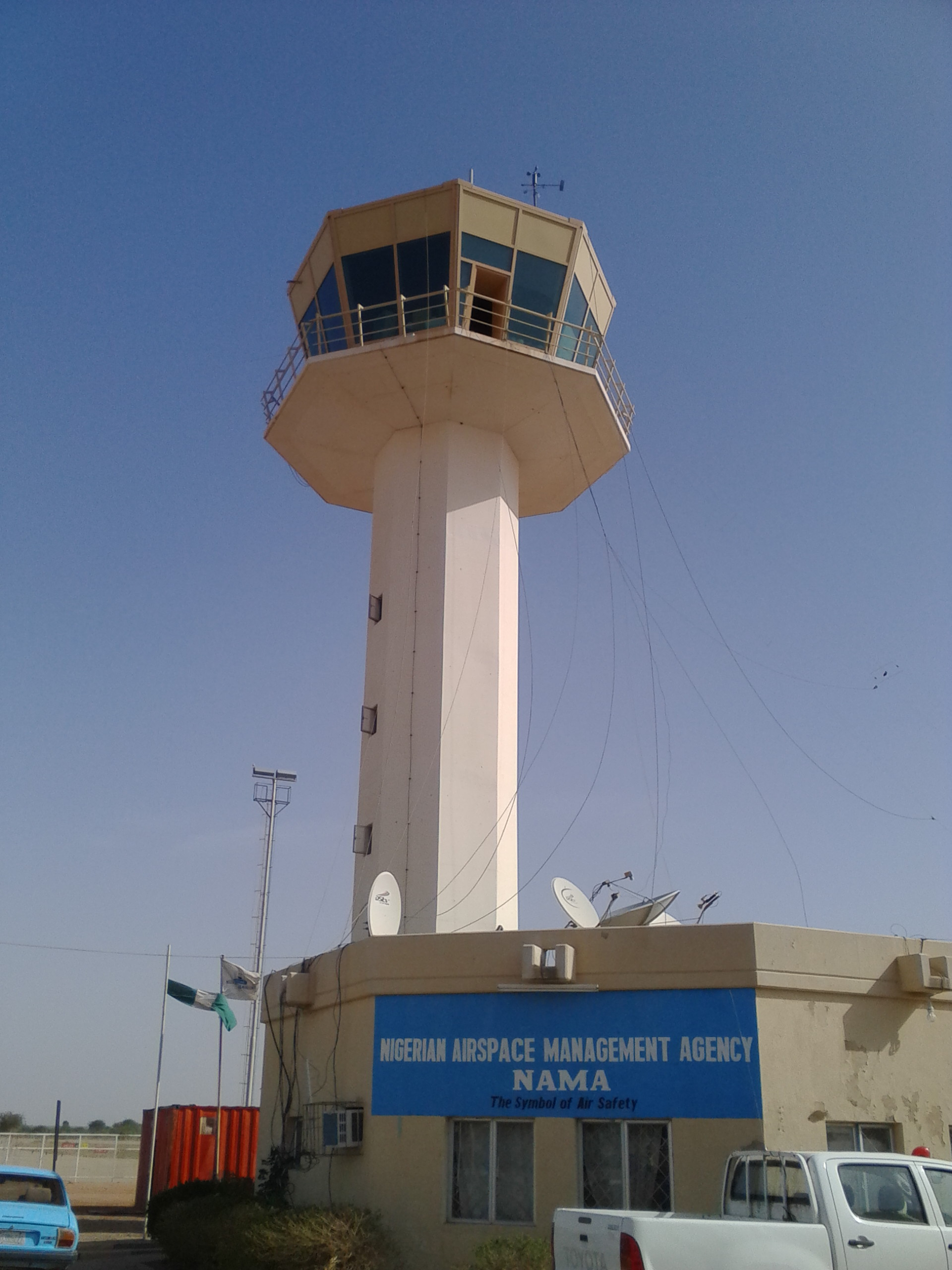
- IATA: DKA; ICAO: DNKT

Summary
- Airport type: Public
- Owner/Operator: Federal Airports Authority of Nigeria
- Serves: Katsina, Nigeria
- Time zone: WAT (UTC+01:00)
- Elevation AMSL: 1,685 ft (514 m)
- Coordinates: 13°00′25″N 7°39′35″E

Map
- Location of the airport in Nigeria

Runways
Direction	Length		Surface
Direction	m	ft	Surface
05/23	3,460	11,352	Asphalt
- Sources: WAD GCM

Umaru Musa Yar'adua Airport (IATA: DKA, ICAO: DNKT, TC LID: DN57) is an airport serving Katsina, the capital of Katsina State in Nigeria. The runway is on the northeast side of the city. It is named after former governor and president Umaru Musa Yar'Adua.

== Airlines and destinations ==
Airlines	Destinations
Max Air	Abuja, Lagos
Rano Air	Abuja
United Nigeria Airlines	Abuja, Lagos

== See also ==
- Transport in Nigeria
- List of airports in Nigeria
