= Lokogoma District, Abuja =

Capital city of Nigeria

Lokogoma (or 'Lokogoma Cadastral Zone C09') is a residential area of Abuja, the capital city of Nigeria. It is 30 minutes from the Nnamdi Azikiwe International Airport and 25 minutes from the city center, and it is still under development.

Lokogoma has undergone a lot of development over recent years, and with this has come a significant increase in population. A number of gated housing estates have sprung up along the Lokogoma expressway.

== History ==
The word Lokogoma is a Hausa word that means ten (10) streets. Lokogoma started when the former minister of Abuja created more land for people seeking land outside the city centre. In May 2022, some Abuja Okada riders set houses on fire in Lokogoma over colleagues’ deaths.

=== Neighborhood overview ===
As of January 2021, there are numerous places for residents to obtain needed items as well as places to relax. These include grocery outlets, sit-outs, eateries, mini shopping outlets, bars and fruit stores.
