= Abubakar Umar Memorial Stadium =

- Gombe Township Stadium
- Interactive map of Abubakar Umar Memorial Stadium
- Address: Nigeria
- Location: Gombe
- Coordinates: 10°18′53″N 11°08′16″E
- Capacity: 10,000
- Type: Multi-purpose stadium

Tenant
- Gombe United F.C. (former)

Abubakar Umar Memorial Stadium is a multi-use stadium in Gombe, Gombe State, Nigeria, with a capacity of 10,000 people. It has been used mostly for football matches and used to be the home stadium of Gombe United F.C.

The state government had long been planning to replace it with a new stadium. The plan was realised when Pantami Stadium was built and commissioned in Gombe in 2010. This newer and more modern facility replaced Abubakar Umar Memorial Stadium in becoming the new official home stadium of Gombe United F.C. However, there have been some concern about neglect of maintenance of Pantami Stadium.

In fact, lack of maintenance for the newer Pantami Stadium has fuelled some calls for the government to look to utilize the "abandoned" Abubakar Umar stadium to ease pressure on Pantami Stadium.
