= July 2015 Gombe bombings =

Terrorist incident in Nigeria

On 16 and 22 July 2015, Gombe, Nigeria, was bombed - apparently by jihadist group Boko Haram.

The Boko Haram insurgency intensified in the mid-2010s, including attacks in the northeastern Nigerian city Gombe in December 2014, January 2015 and February 2015.

On 16 June 2015 in Gombe, a double bombing occurred at a busy marketplace during late afternoon, killing 49 people and injuring 71 others. The first bomb detonated outside a footwear shop and the second outside a china shop opposite it.

On 22 June 2015 in Gombe, at least two bombs exploded at two bus stations, killing at least 29 people.
