= Doma United F.C. =

Doma United
- Full name: Doma United Football Club
- Nickname: The Savannah Tigers
- Founded: 1994
- Ground: Pantami Stadium
- Capacity: 12,000
- Owner: Suleiman Umar
- League: Nigeria Premier League
- 2023–24: 18th of 20 (relegated)
- Website: domaunitedfc.com

Doma United Football Club is a Nigerian football club based in the neighbourhood of Doma in Gombe. Since gaining promotion in 2022, the club plays in the Nigeria Premier League.

== History ==
The club was founded in 1994 and spent a lot of time in the lower leagues before gaining promotion to the Premier League in 2022.

They finished 5th at Group B in their first season in the top flight, narrowly missing out in the super six.

== Current squad ==
Squad list for 2023–24 season.

Note: Flags indicate national team as defined under FIFA eligibility rules; some limited exceptions apply. Players may hold more than one non-FIFA nationality.

No.	Pos.	Nation	Player
1	GK	NGA	Abdullahi Zalli
35	GK	NGA	Mammam Ibrahim
33	GK	NGA	Emmanuel Oche
13	DF	NGA	Zakari Boyi
22	DF	NGA	Saifullahi Yusuf
6	DF	NGA	Auwal Abubakar
40	DF	NGA	Adamu Umar Adah
23	DF	NGA	Zaidu Mohammed
24	DF	NGA	Andrew Naroro
5	DF	NGA	Maurice Chigozie
3	DF	NGA	Haruna Aliyu
12	DF	NGA	Abiam Nelson
2	DF	NGA	Nasiru Suleiman
28	MF	NGA	Agwu Jerry
4	MF	NGA	Jacob Manga
8	MF	NGA	Ekawu Hilary

No.	Pos.	Nation	Player
29	MF	NGA	Isaac Nassy
27	MF	NGA	Daniel Simon Adoga
31	MF	NGA	Samuel Matthew
14	FW	NGA	Emmanuel Jesam
7	FW	NGA	Mustapha Ibrahim
21	MF	NGA	Abubakar Abdullahi
30	MF	NGA	Sani Suleiman
25	FW	NGA	Kazeem Abdulrafiu
17	FW	NGA	Charles Terwar
39	FW	NGA	Babas Theophilus
20	FW	NGA	Owoku Bidemi
19	FW	NGA	Umar Adamu
18	FW	NGA	Emmanuel Ogwuche
15	FW	NGA	Samuel Enefiok
37	FW	NGA	Usman Adamu
10	FW	NGA	Usman Musa
