= Gombe Line =

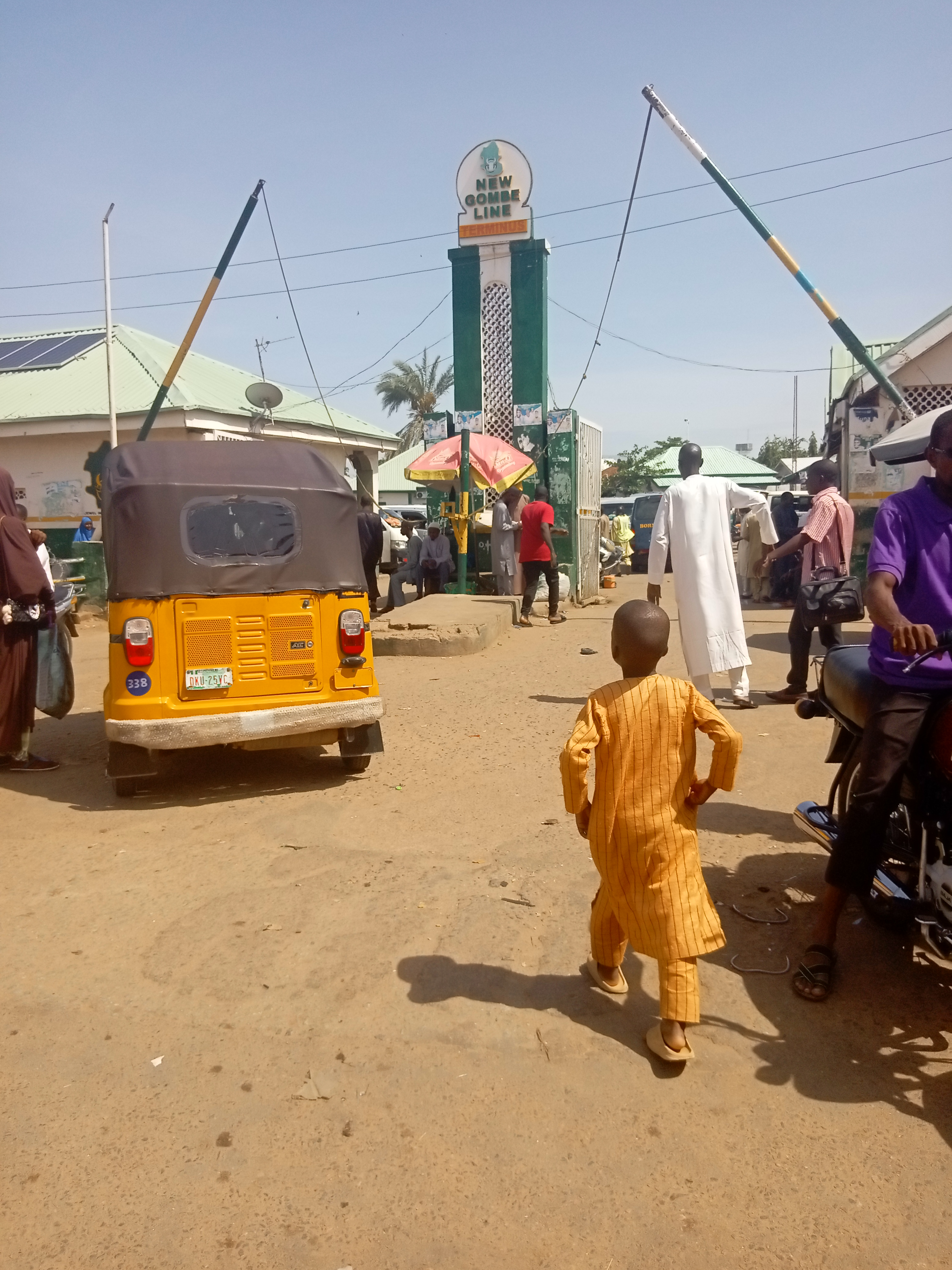
Gombe line Motor park

The Gombe Line is the largest mass transit operation owned and commissioned by the government of Gombe State, Nigeria. Its largest station is in downtown Gombe City.
