= Maiduguri International Airport =

Airport serving Maiduguri, Nigeria

Muhammadu Buhari International Airport
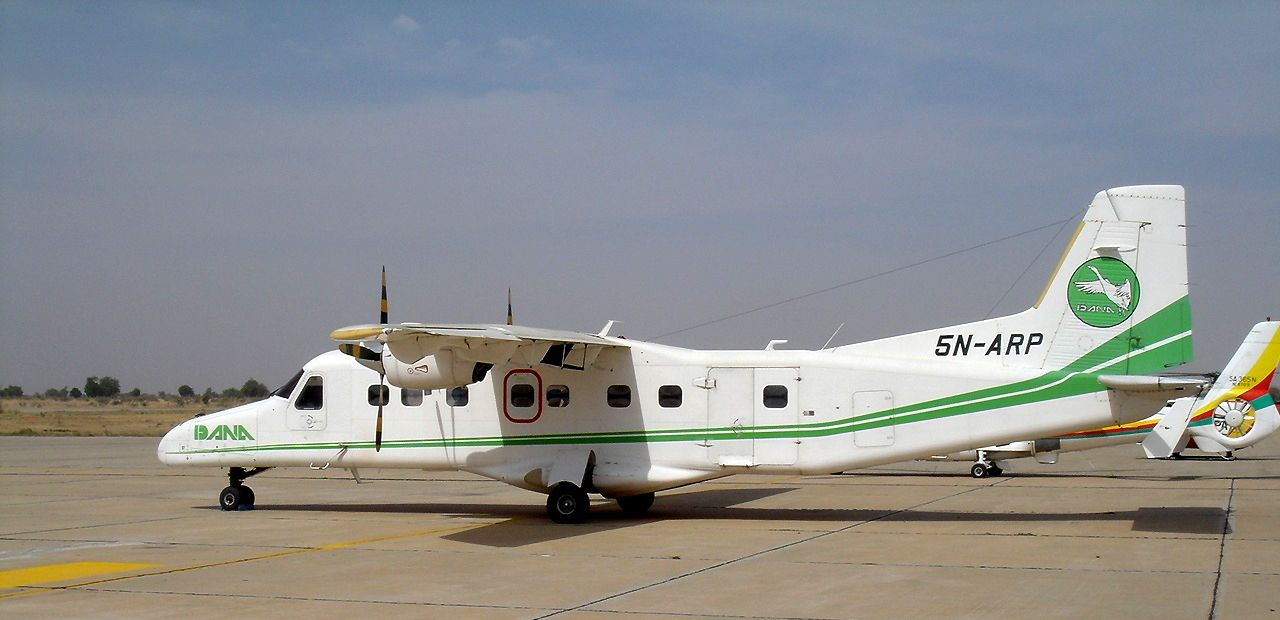
- IATA: MIU; ICAO: DNMA

Summary
- Airport type: Public
- Owner/Operator: Federal Airports Authority of Nigeria
- Serves: Maiduguri, Borno State, Nigeria
- Time zone: WAT (UTC+01:00)
- Elevation AMSL: 1,099 ft (335 m)
- Coordinates: 11°51′20″N 13°04′55″E

Map
- Location of the airport in Nigeria

Runways
Direction	Length		Surface
Direction	m	ft	Surface
05/23	3,000	9,843	Asphalt
- Sources: WAD GCM

Maiduguri International Airport (now General Mumammadu Buhari Airport) (IATA: MIU, ICAO: DNMA) is an airport serving Maiduguri, the capital of Borno State in Nigeria.

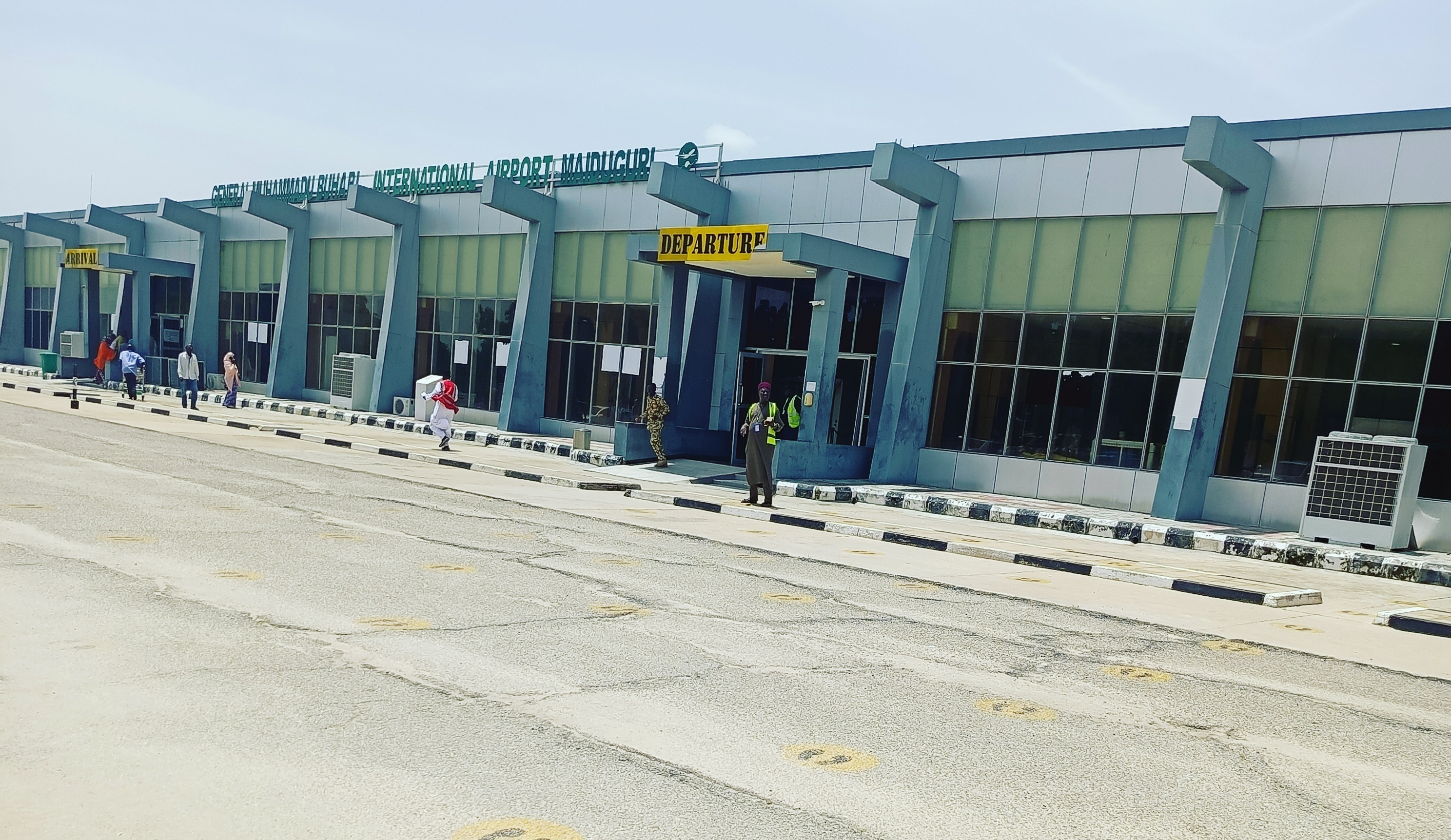
General Muhammadu Buhari International Airport Maiduguri

The first aircraft, an Airco DH.9, that landed in Nigeria, landed in Maiduguri in 1925.

== Airlines and destinations ==
Airlines	Destinations
Azman Air	Abuja, Kaduna, Kano, Lagos, Yola
Max Air	Abuja

== See also ==
- Transport in Nigeria
- List of airports in Nigeria
