= Federal College of Education (Technical), Gombe =

Teachers college in Gombe State, Nigeria

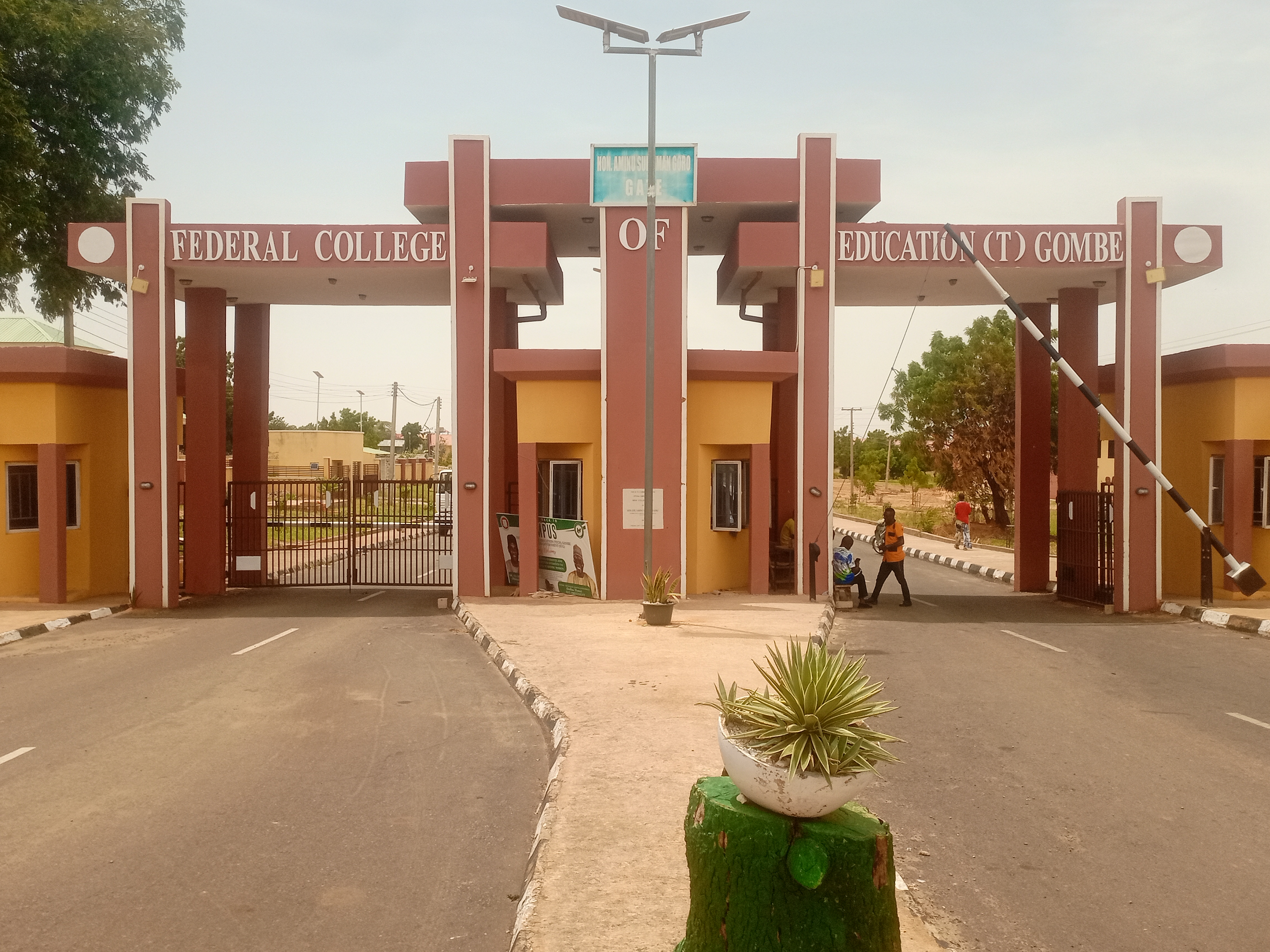
- Type: Public
- Established: 1977
- Affiliations: Abubakar Tafawa Balewa University
- Provost: Dr Ali Adamu (Boderi)
- Location: Gombe, Gombe State, Nigeria; 10.3150°N 11.1464°E
- Campus: Urban
- Website: Official website
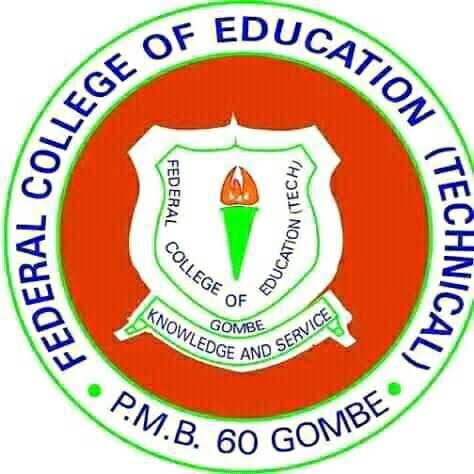

The Federal College of Education (Technical), Gombe was formerly known as National Technical Teachers College. Its a federal government higher education institution located in Gombe, Gombe State, Nigeria. The mandate of the college since its inception was producing technical, vocational and science teachers for primary and secondary schools in the Country. It is affiliated with Abubakar Tafawa Balewa University and the University of Maiduguri for its degree programmes. The provost is Dr. Ali Adamu (Boderi).

== College library ==
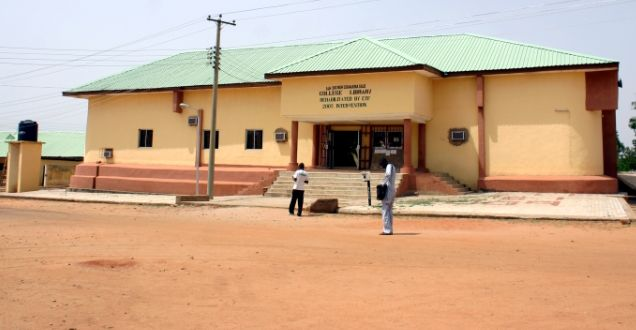
Main library

The College Library was established in 1977 with a collection of 500 volume of books. It started on a temporary site in the former Gombe Crafts School, under the leadership of a Principal, and started moving to its permanent site in 1989 and finally relocated to the permanent site in 1996. Presently, the College library is made up of a main library and a virtual library. The library's primary goals are to enhance teaching and learning by developing and organizing the information resources that are available there. The library currently has more than 40 thousand volumes of textbooks and 45 staff strength that manage the library. The current college librarian is Yusuf Shehu Aliyu.

== Structure of the library ==
The college library has four sections for effective information services to the college students, researchers, and lecturers which are:

- Administration Section: this is the college librarian division that heads all the libraries by overseeing their affairs and reporting to the provost. The office is responsible for planning, managing, directing, monitoring and supervising all the activities of the library system.
- Technical Services Section: this is the collection development and processing of the information resources such as acquisition, cataloging, classification and Reprographic/Bindery services for making ready available to users in the library.
- Reader's Service Section: in this section users like students and staff make use of available information resources such as consultation of books, borrowing and returning of books, documentation of students projects and reserve services are also provided by this section.
- Virtual library Section: this section contain online and offline information resources. Online and offline databases are all available in the section, since all information services are automated to save the time of the users with easy accessibility. The computers facilities are used for electronic examination, workshops, college library is opened every Monday to Friday from 8:00am to 6:00pm, Saturday 8:00am to 12:00 Noon while during vacation every Monday to Friday from 8:00am to 4:00pm.
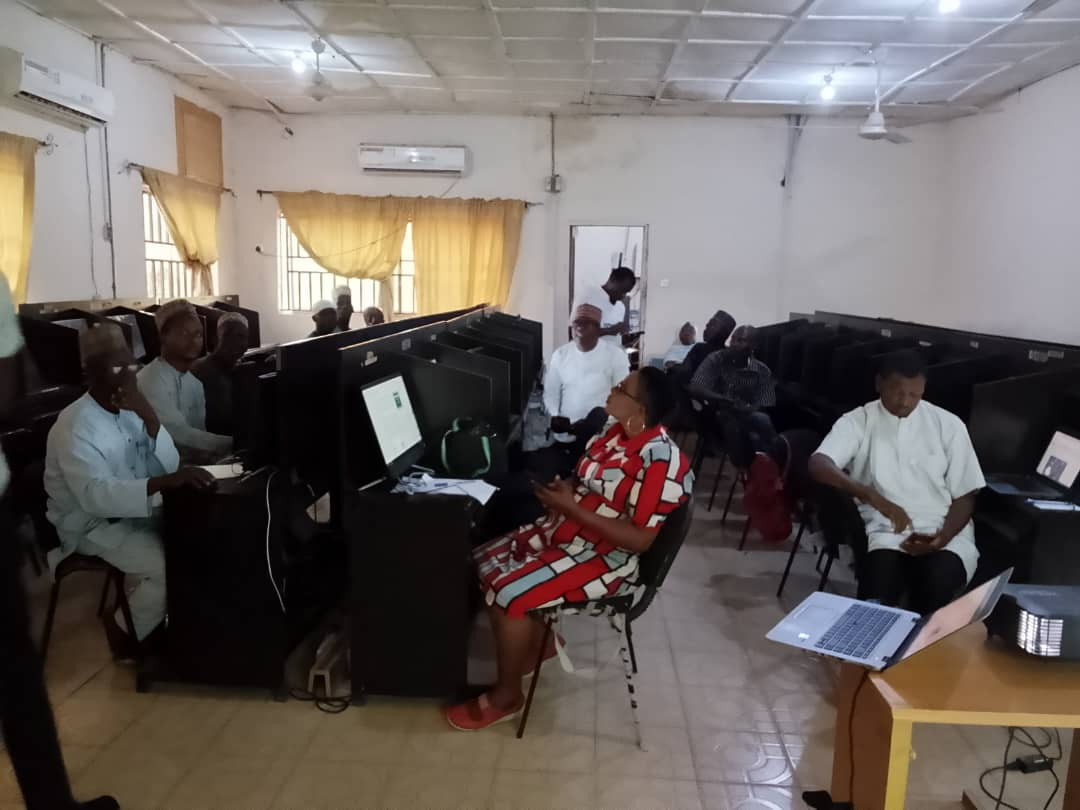
  FCE (T) Gombe E-Library, Users on Session

== History ==
The college was established in 1977. It was originally known as National Technical Teachers College but was later named Federal College of Education (Technical), Gombe.

== Schools ==
- School of Education
- School of Business Education
- School of Vocational Education
- School of Science Education
- School of Technical Education
- School of Primary and Early Child Care Education
- School of Arts and Social Sciences Secondary Education
- School of Languages Secondary Education
- School of General Studies Secondary Education

== Courses ==
The institution offers the following courses;

- Home Economics
- Primary Education Studies
- Mathematics
- Integrated Science
- Technical Education
- Woodwork Education
- Automobile Technology Education
- Agricultural Science Education
- Biology
- Computer Education
- Chemistry
- Biology
- Chemistry
- Business Education

== Affiliation ==
The institution is affiliated with the Abubakar Tafawa Balewa University to offer programmes leading to Bachelor of Education, (B.Ed.) in;

- Education & Physics
- Wood Work/Education
- Education And Chemistry
- Business Education
- Education And Biology
- Education & Mathematics
- Agricultural Science And Education
- Education And Integrated Science
- Home Economics And Education
