= Gombe, Nigeria =

Capital city of Gombe State, Nigeria

Gombe
- City and LGA
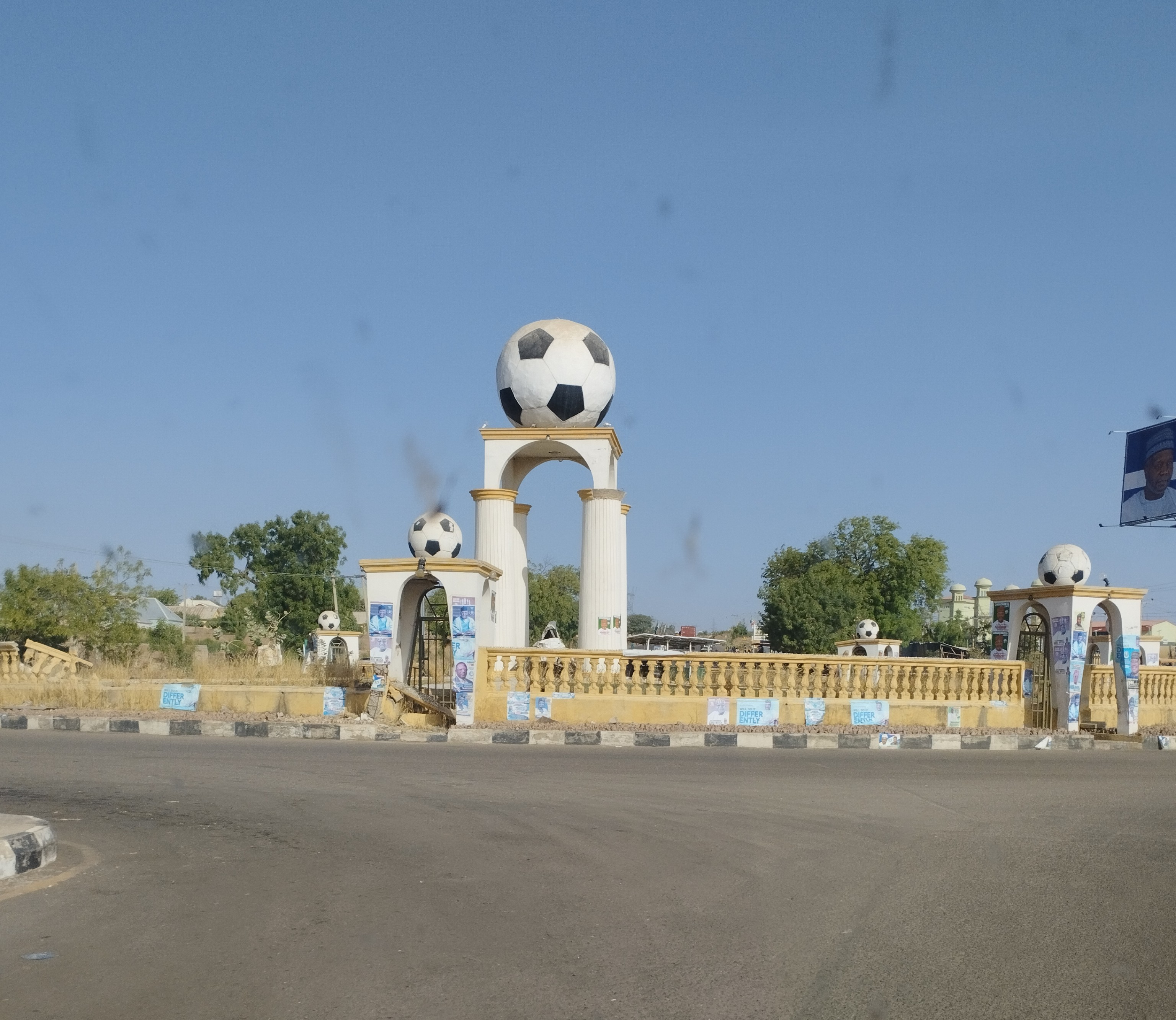
- Roundabout in Gombe
- Interactive map of Gombe
- Location within Nigeria
- Coordinates: 10°17′N 11°10′E
- Country: Nigeria
- State: Gombe State

Government
  - Lamiɗo: Abubakar Shehu-Abubakar
  - Local Government Chairman: Alh. Ali Usman Haruna (Ashaka)

Area
  - Total: 52 km^{2} (20 sq mi)
- Elevation: 451.61 m (1,481.7 ft)

Population (2006 Census)
  - Total: 280,000
  - Estimate (2022): 446,800
  - Density: 5,400/km^{2} (14,000/sq mi)
- Time zone: UTC+1 (WAT)
- 3-digit postal code prefix: 760
- Area code: 072
- ISO 3166 code: NG.GO.GO
- Climate: Aw

Gombe (Fula: Gelle/Wuro Gombe 𞤺𞤫𞥅𞤤𞥆𞤫/𞤱𞤵𞥅𞤪𞤮 𞤺𞤮𞤥𞤥𞤦𞤫,) is the capital city of Gombe State, north-eastern Nigeria, with an estimated population of around 450,000. The major spoken languages in Gombe are Fulfulɗe and Hausa.

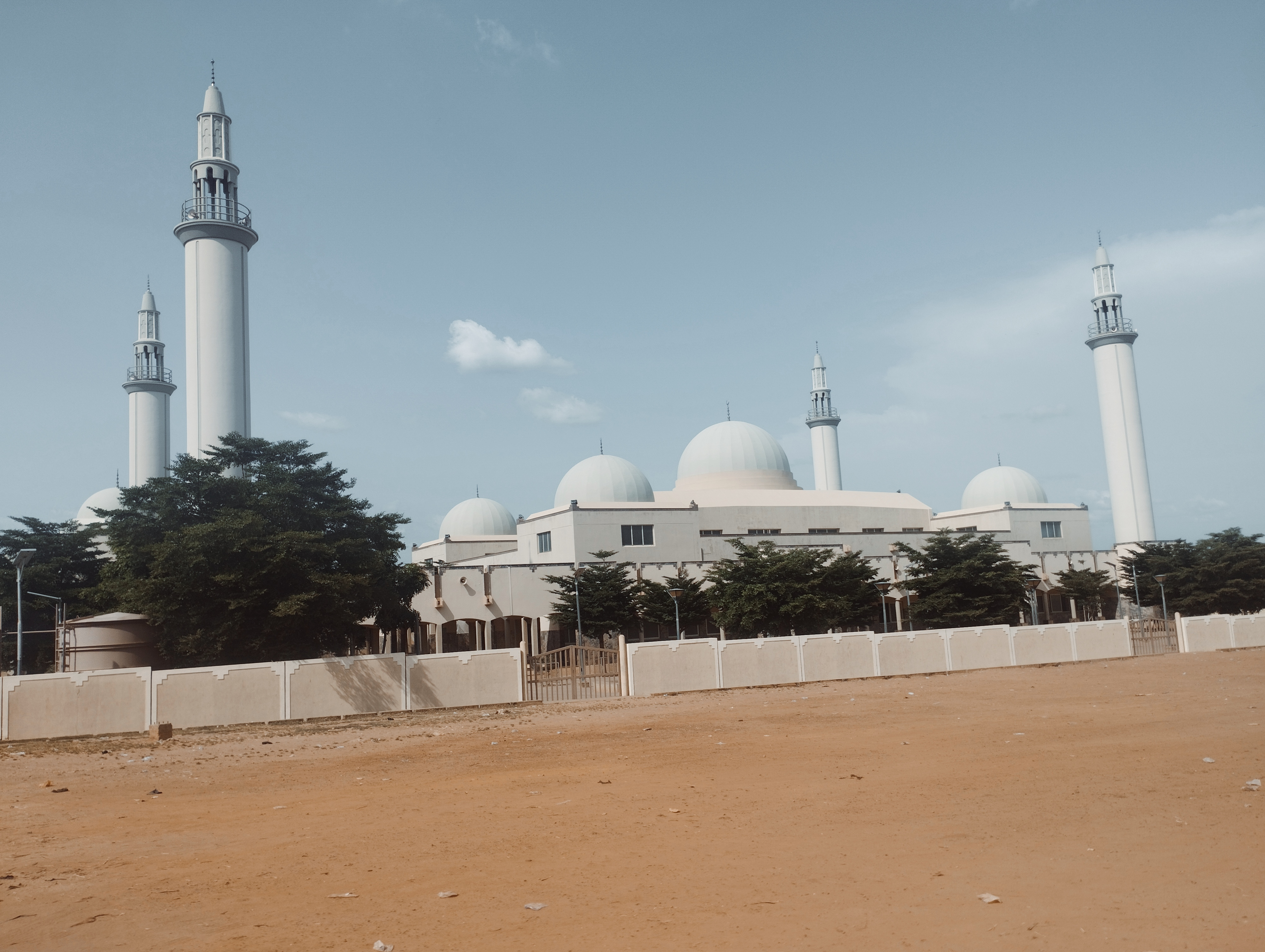
Gombe Central Mosque

== Population ==
Gombe State is populated by the Fulani people constituting more than half of the state's population. Other ethnic groups include the Bolewa, Tera, Waja, Lunguda and Hausa people.

The LGA has an area of 52 km^{2} and a population of 280,000 at the 2006 census.

The postal code of the area is 760.

== Administration ==
A chairman who is chosen by the residents of the local government area leads the Gombe Local Government Area's administration. The vice-chairman and councilors provide assistance to the chairman, who is in charge of overseeing the day-to-day operations of the local government area.

11 Wards make up the Gombe Local Government Area. The wards are:

- Jekadafari
- Ajiya
- Bolari West
- Bolari East
- Kumbiya - Kumbiya
- Pantami
- Shamaki
- Dawaki
- Nasarawo
- Herwagana
- Bajoga

== Politics ==
The current Local Government Chairman is Barrister Sani Ahmad Haruna.

== Transport ==
Gombe is served by Gombe Lawanti International Airport, and by a station on the eastern mainline of the national railway network and Gombe Line Terminal in mid-city. On 1 Feb., President Goodluck Jonathan announced that the Gombe-Kafanchan-Kaduna intercity train services had been "rehabilitated", saying "the inauguration of the train services was crucial to the growth and development of the Gombe and other adjoining states." "Minister of Transport, Idris Umar, flagged off the Gombe-Kafanchan-Port Harcourt and Gombe-Kafanchan-Kaduna intercity train services."

== Culture and education ==
Gombe, as Gombe State capital, is the home of the notable Gombe State University (GSU) located at Shamaki ward, Tudun Wada, Gombe. The university was established during the then government of Governor Danjuma Goje in 2004, making it the first University in the State. Also, in Gombe is Federal College of Education (Technical), Gombe. Another state-run tertiary institution in Gombe is the College of Nursing and Midwifery Gombe State, which is situated in Jekadefari. Moreover, the College of Medical Sciences is also located in Gombe. Additionally, Gombe is home to a number of public and private elementary and secondary institutions, including MATRIX International Academy, Gombe Central, Government Science Secondary School, Government Day Secondary School (Pilot), and Pen Resource Academy, to name a few.

=== Quran ===
Nigeria has the highest number of huffadh in the world, with more than 1 million memorizers of the Quran. Many of them live in northern Nigeria and particularly in Gombe where Quran is an integral part of the culture of the Muslim community there. From a very young age, children are sent to Quranic schools where they first learn to read Arabic and then memorize the Quran. Quran is so highly prioritized by these communities that students will go to these madrasas before completing a university or scientific education. As a result of these efforts, several world class readers have emerged from the state including Hajara Ibrahim who won the International Female Quranic Recitation Competition in Jordan.

== Economy ==
Farming is the main source of income for the inhabitants of Gombe State. Maize, millet, Guinea corn, rice, cotton, groundnut, beans, Beni seed, and other food and cash crops are farmed in the state. Livestock rearing is also common in the state. Tudun Hatsi is a notable market where grain business thrives in Gombe local government. The market generates huge revenue to the local government and the state in general.

The Gombe Urban Market is located in the Herwagana ward of Gombe Local Government. The state's geographical location and friendly economy make it a commercial area where entrepreneurs, even neighboring states, have their SMEs established. These SMEs have been the source of employment and income generation to many individuals

Gombe town's location in the heart of the North-East has made it a popular resting and gathering spot for travelers and traders from all over the geopolitical zone and beyond.

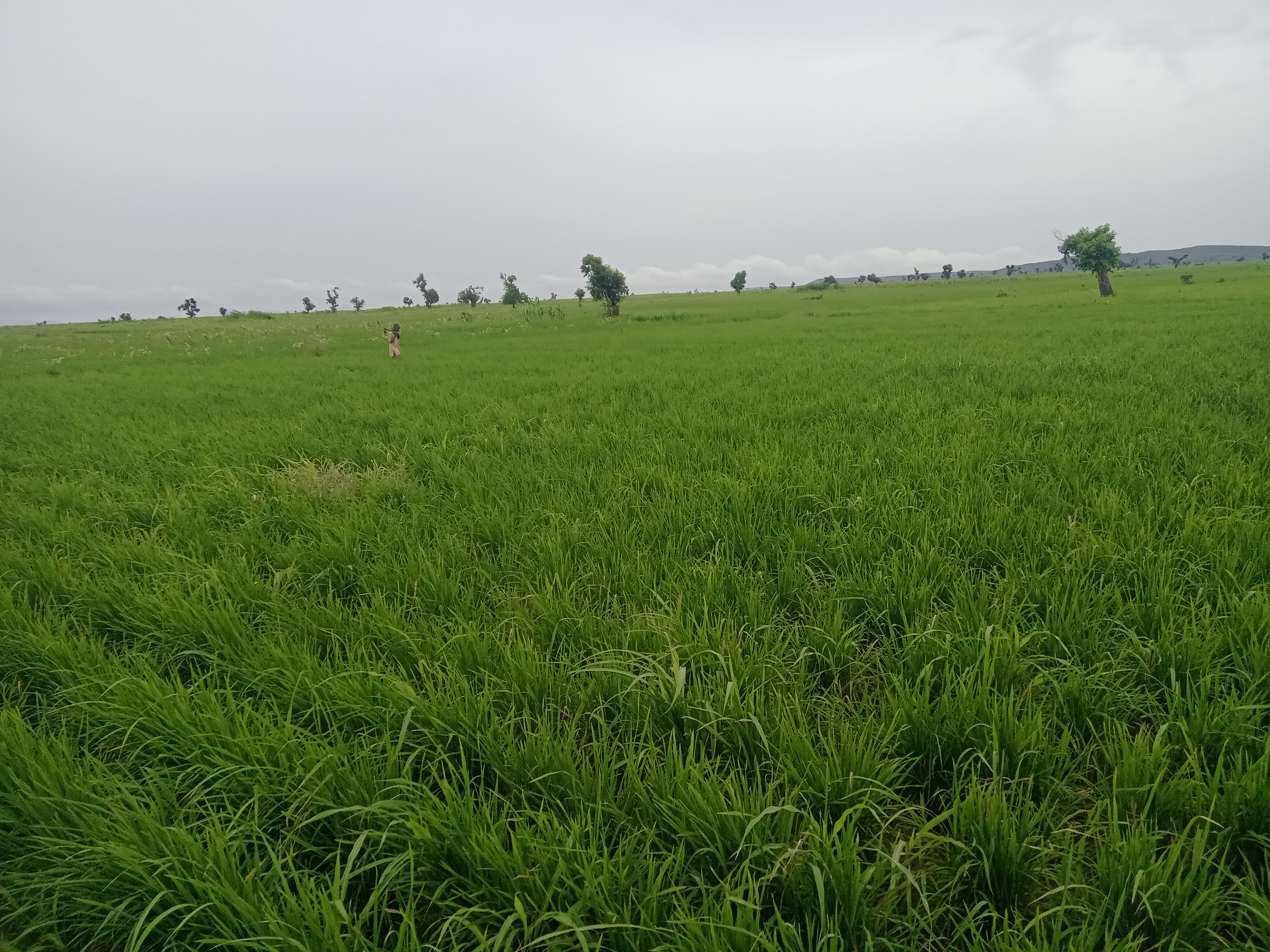
Rice farming is carried out in Gombe state

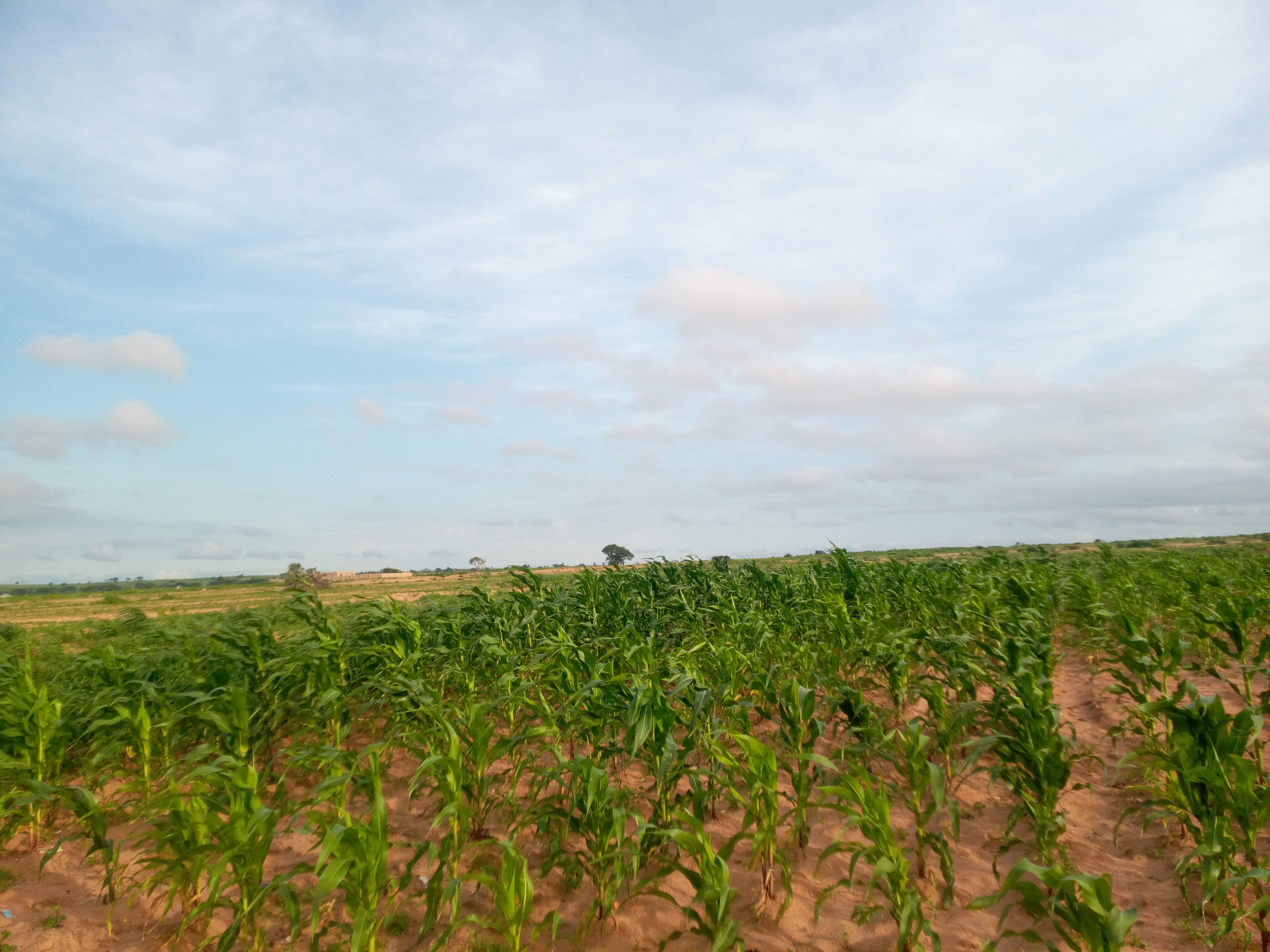
Maize farm in Akko, Gombe state, Nigeria

In 2008 an agreement was reached "to set up anti-venom manufacturing plant in Kaltungo General Hospital in Gombe," and provide medical training for snakebite patients. The Gombe State government ordered an additional N4 million in anti-venom for the hospital in 2009, due to a local increase in snakebites.

== Sports ==
Gombe is also home to the new Pantami Stadium, a 12000-capacity sporting complex erected in 2010 by the then Governor Danjuma Goje's administration to help the state's sports growth. It replaced the earlier Abubakar Umar Memorial Stadium and is home to Gombe United F.C. and Gombe Bulls, the 2017 Nigerian Premier League runners-up (basketball).

== Boko Haram ==
Gombe has been impacted by jihadist group Boko Haram's insurgency, having been attacked several times in the mid-2010s.

On 22 December 2014, a suicide bombing at a bus station killed over 20 people.

On 1 January 2015, a suicide bomber attacked a New Year's Eve service at a church, injuring several people. On 14 January 2015, a suicide bomber killed two people and left 14 wounded at a Gombe mosque.

On 2 February 2015, just minutes after a campaign rally by President Goodluck Johnathan, an attack by a female suicide bomber left one person dead and eighteen injured. Two blasts had occurred in the city the previous day, leaving five people dead. Local residents "have set up checkpoints to defend Gombe" according to the BBC.

Boko Haram attacked Gombe on 14 February 2015, as well as on 16 and 22 July 2015.

== Climate ==
Located at an elevation of 451.61 m (1,481.7 ft) above sea level, Gombe has a Tropical wet and dry or savanna climate (Classification: Aw). The city's yearly temperature is 30.54 °C (86.97 °F) and it is 1.08% higher than Nigeria's averages.

Climate data for Gombe (1991–2020)
Month	Jan	Feb	Mar	Apr	May	Jun	Jul	Aug	Sep	Oct	Nov	Dec	Year
Record high °C (°F)	39.4 (102.9)	40.5 (104.9)	43 (109)	43 (109)	42 (108)	38 (100)	36 (97)	37 (99)	35 (95)	37.1 (98.8)	38 (100)	38.7 (101.7)	43.0 (109.4)
Mean daily maximum °C (°F)	31.1 (88.0)	34.2 (93.6)	37.5 (99.5)	38.3 (100.9)	35.7 (96.3)	32.4 (90.3)	30.2 (86.4)	29.2 (84.6)	30.5 (86.9)	32.7 (90.9)	33.8 (92.8)	31.9 (89.4)	33.1 (91.6)
Daily mean °C (°F)	23.6 (74.5)	26.6 (79.9)	30.1 (86.2)	31.6 (88.9)	29.9 (85.8)	27.6 (81.7)	26.0 (78.8)	25.2 (77.4)	25.9 (78.6)	27.2 (81.0)	26.7 (80.1)	24.3 (75.7)	27.1 (80.8)
Mean daily minimum °C (°F)	16.1 (61.0)	19.1 (66.4)	22.8 (73.0)	25.0 (77.0)	24.2 (75.6)	22.8 (73.0)	22.7 (72.9)	22.6 (72.7)	22.5 (72.5)	22.5 (72.5)	22.2 (72.0)	16.7 (62.1)	21.6 (70.9)
Record low °C (°F)	9 (48)	10 (50)	11 (52)	17 (63)	15 (59)	15 (59)	16.2 (61.2)	12.4 (54.3)	16 (61)	15 (59)	11 (52)	9 (48)	9.0 (48.2)
Average precipitation mm (inches)	0.0 (0.0)	0.0 (0.0)	3.0 (0.12)	29.9 (1.18)	85.9 (3.38)	154.0 (6.06)	230.8 (9.09)	297.7 (11.72)	193.4 (7.61)	50.0 (1.97)	1.8 (0.07)	0.5 (0.02)	1,046.8 (41.21)
Average precipitation days (≥ 1.0 mm)	0.0	0.0	0.2	2.2	6.0	8.6	11.9	14.2	11.2	3.9	0.3	0.1	58.4
Average relative humidity (%)	21.9	17.3	20.8	43.0	60.1	71.6	79.3	85.2	84.1	74.8	47.0	31.2	53.0
Source: NOAA

== See also ==
- Gombe State University
- Railway stations in Nigeria
- List of governors of Gombe State
