= Bauchi Airport =

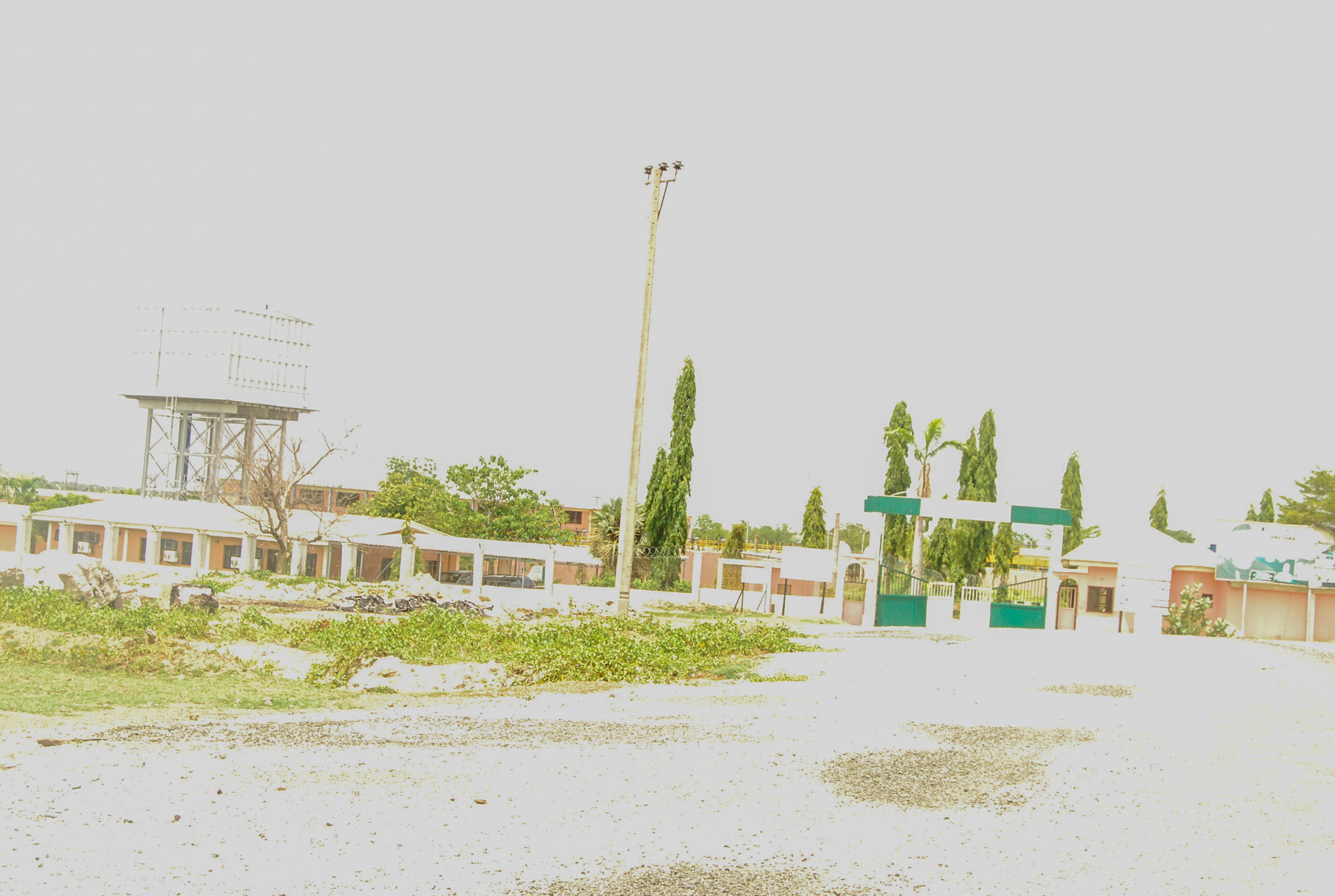
- IATA: none; ICAO: DNBA

Summary
- Airport type: Public
- Serves: Bauchi
- Elevation AMSL: 1,998 ft / 609 m
- Coordinates: 10°17′35″N 9°49′50″E

Map
- Location of the airport in Nigeria

Runways
Direction	Length		Surface
Direction	m	ft	Surface
15/33	2,300	7,546	Asphalt
- Source: Google Maps OurAirports

Bauchi Airport is an airport located in the city of Bauchi in Nigeria.

Scheduled airline service has been moved to the newer Bauchi State Airport located out of the city. The IATA airport code BCU has been transferred to the new airport. The former NE/SW runway is now used as a taxiway and carries taxiway markings.

Even though most operations have been moved to the newer airport, the in-town airport is still a functioning landmark.

Bauchi airport is also the main link for the primarily Muslim northern state, it serves Muslim pilgrims and hosts airlines that serves internationally, it is also relatively well-maintained. The most known visitors are travellers, Air Force personnel, pilots, and aviation officers who frequent this location.

== See also ==
- Transport in Nigeria
- List of airports in Nigeria
