= Adedayo Olawuyi =

Nigerian businessman and corporate executive

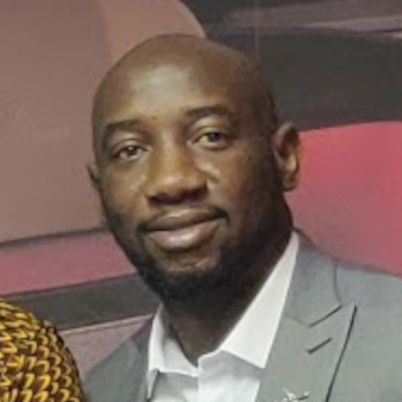
- Born: Nigeria
- Education: Federal Government College, Ilorin
- Alma mater: University of Ibadan; Cranfield University
- Occupations: Businessman and Corporate executive
- Years active: 2000s–present
- Known for: Business, management
- Title: Chief Commercial Officer at United Nigeria Airlines

Adedayo Olawuyi is a Nigerian businessman and corporate executive, who is the chief commercial officer of United Nigeria Airlines since April 2026.

== Background and education ==
Olawuyi is Nigerian by birth.

He graduated with a Bachelor's Degree in Mathematics from the University of Ibadan in 2002. He completed his Master's degree in Air Transport Management from Cranfield University in the UK in 2016.

== Career ==
In 2018, he joined Africa World Airlines in Ghana as the Network and Planning Manager. He was promoted to Head of Commercial in 2020.

In 2023, Olawuyi was hired by Uganda Airlines as its new Chief Commercial Officer based in Kampala.

He was instrumental in driving Uganda Airlines' launch of service to Mumbai, London, Lagos, Abuja, Harare and Lusaka.

Olawuyi resigned from Uganda Airlines in March 2026 and was immediately announced as the Chief Commercial Officer for United Nigeria Airlines.

== See also ==
- Transport in Uganda
- List of airlines of Uganda
