= Abuja Gateway Consortium =

Abuja Gateway Consortium (AGC) is a consortium that manages Nnamdi Azikiwe International Airport in Nigeria. It was created by Airline Services Limited (ASL) Nigeria, Asset and Resource Management (ARM) Nigeria, NairaNet Technologies Limited A.G. Nigeria, A.G. Ferrero Ltd. Nigeria and Airport Consulting Vienna Gmbh (ACV) Austria.

== History ==
Abuja was awarded to AGC on November 13, 2006, under a Public-Private Partnership arrangement. The consortium's bid included investments of about US$371 million, out of which US$50 million were deployed in the first five years.

The contract was terminated in April 2008.

== See also ==
- Nnamdi Azikiwe International Airport
