= 2014 Gombe and Bauchi bombings =

Terrorist incident in Nigeria

2014 Gombe bus station bombing
- Part of the Boko Haram insurgency
- Location: Bauchi, Bauchi State and Gombe, Gombe State, Nigeria
- Date: 22 December 2014
- Target: bus station
- Attack type: Bombing
- Deaths: 27
- Injuries: 60

On 22 December 2014, bombings against civilian locations in two Northern Nigerian cities killed 27 people and injured 60 more. The first happened at a bus station in Gombe, Gombe State, Nigeria. It killed 20 people. The second blast was more powerful and occurred at a market in Bauchi, Bauchi State.
