= MRS Oil Nigeria Plc =

Nigerian oil marketing company

MRS Oil Nigeria PLC
- Type: Public
- Traded as: NGX: CHEVRON
- Industry: Oil and gas
- Predecessor: Chevron Nigeria Plc; Texaco Nigeria Plc
- Headquarters: Lagos, Nigeria
- Area served: Nigeria
- Key people: Patrice Albert; Marco Storari
- Products: Premium Motor Spirit; AGO; dual purpose kerosene; Aviation kerosene; Lubricants
- Revenue: 182.310 billion naira (2023)
- Net income: 4.048 billion naira (2023)
- Owner: MRS Holdings Ltd.
- Website: www.mrsoilnigplc.net

MRS Oil Nigeria Plc is a Nigerian oil marketing company with headquarters in Lagos. The firm previously traded under the name of Texaco Nigeria Plc.

== History ==
Previously known as Texaco Nigeria Plc, a firm whose activities in Nigeria dates back to 1969 when it was established to take over the Nigerian trading interest of Texaco Africa Limited. In 2006, Texaco Nigeria became Chevron Oil Nigeria Plc.

In 2009, a consortium of MRS Holdings and Petroci Holdings bought majority stake of Chevron Oil Nigeria Plc to form MRS Oil Nigeria PLC. The transaction was operated between Chevron's Bermuda-based holding (Chevron Nigeria Holdings Ltd.) and MRS' Panama-based holding (Corlay Global S.A.).

In 2025, MRS Oil Nigeria was delisted from the Nigerian Exchange Limited and listed to the NASD OTC Securities Exchange.

== Activities ==
MRS Oil has three business units: sale of petroleum at retail outlets or to industries, sale of aviation fuel and blending of lubricants.

MRS OIL is 60%-owned by MRS Africa Holding, property of Aliko Dangote's half-brother Sayyu Dantata.

== See also ==
- Chevron Nigeria
