= Akin Olateru =

Nigerian engineer

Akinola Olateru is a Nigerian engineer. He was the commissioner of the Accident Investigation Bureau, Nigeria from 2017 to 2023.

== Education and career ==
Olateru grew up in Ogbomoso, Osun State. He started his career as a maintenance engineer with Pan African Airlines and the Nigerian Police Air Wing. He has worked with British Midland Airways, KLM, and Martinair.

He got his M.Sc. in Air Transport Management from City University of London in 2003.

In January 2017, he was appointed by former president Muhammadu Buhari as the head of the Accident Investigation Bureau (AIB-Nigeria). He was reappointed in March 2021. He was removed by president Bola Ahmed Tinubu in December 2023.

He is a Fellow of the Nigerian Society of Engineers, Royal Aeronautical Society, and Chartered Institute of Logistics and Transport in the UK.

== Awards ==
- Aviation Man of the Year - Air Transport Industry Awards 2019
- Outstanding Leadership Award, Nigerian Aviation (NIGAV) Awards, 2019.
- Aviation CEO of The Year Award - The Travellers, 2021.
- Aviation Innovation Leadership Achievement Award - Nigerian Aviation Awards, 2022.
