= Pantami, Gombe =

Pantami is a district head ward in Gombe Local Government Area of Gombe State, Nigeria. Pantami is located at the terminal southern part of Gombe Local Government area, with Associated Zip Code: 760253. Pantami is one of the largest wards in Gombe local government area with eighteen major polling units.

It is also where the Pantami Stadium, an international stadium with a 12,000 capacity, is located.

== Polling units ==
There are 50 polling units in Pantami ward.

- Wakili Hamza, Kofar W. Hamza
- Malam Maina, Kofar M. Maina
- Abba, Kofar Abba.
- Parasha, Kofar Parasha.
- Gabukka Primary. School., Gabukka Pri. Sch.
- Jauro Bappi, Kofar J. Bappi.
- Malam Kuri I, Pantami Pri. Sch.
- Malam Kuri Il, Pantami Pri. Sch.
- Wakili Madu, Kofar Wakili Madu.
- G. S. A. D. P., Kofar G. S. A. D. P.
- Maternity, Pantami Maternity.
- L. Dambam, Kofar L. Dambam.
- Manawashi, K/j Manawashi.
- Sarkin Pantami, Kofar S. Pantami
