= Pantami Stadium =

Pantami Township Stadium in Gombe state

Coordinates: 10°16′35.5″N 11°10′6.5″E

The Pantami Stadium is a 12,000 capacity multi-purpose stadium at the Pantami district of Gombe,

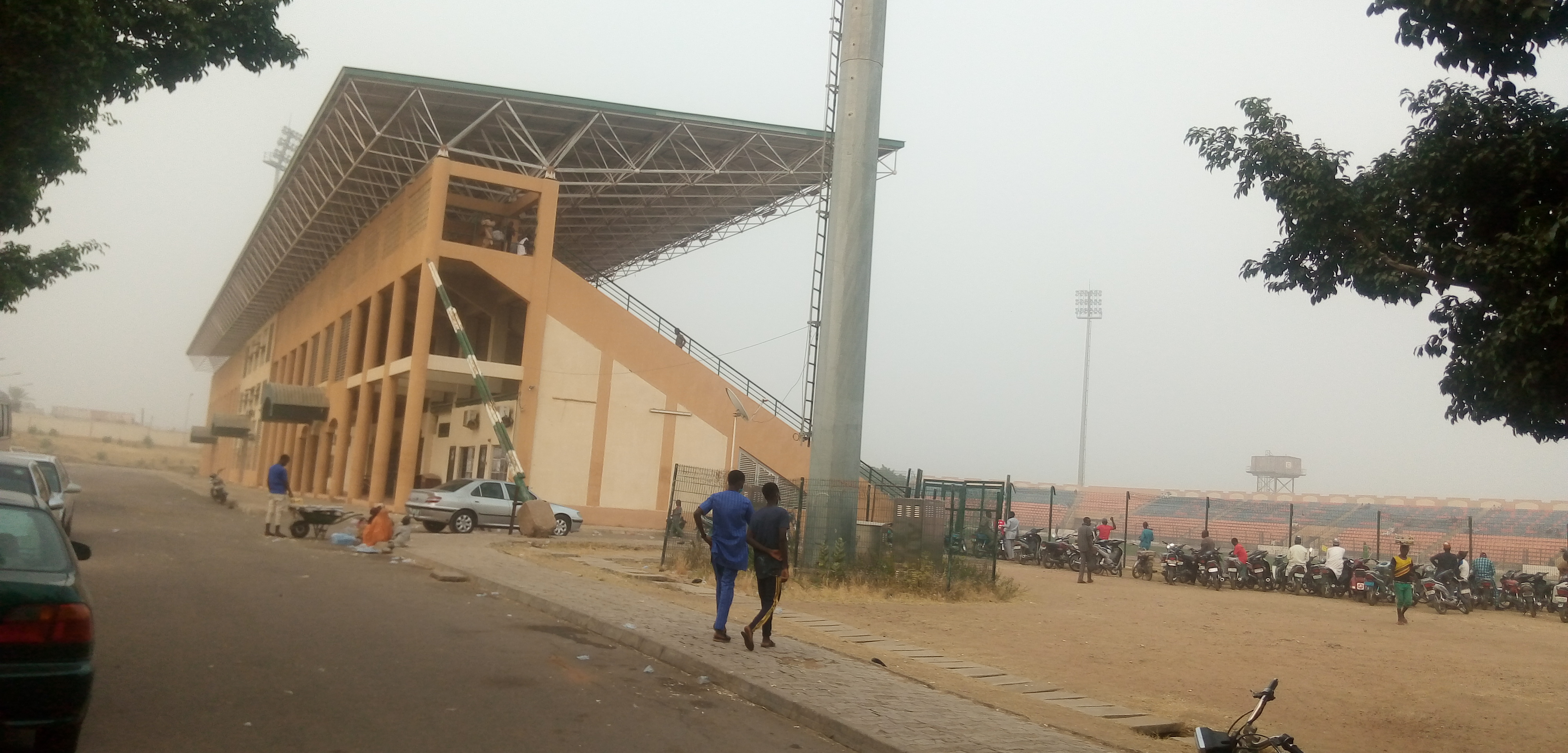
The exterior of Pantami Stadium.

Gombe State, Nigeria. It is used mostly for football matches but also for state and national ceremonial events, such as religious, political and social events. It is the official home stadium of Gombe United F.C. and Doma United F.C. and has been considered one of the most modern sport centres in the country. It was reconstructed in 2010.

The structure boast of three major facilities which accommodate a synthetic football pitch, a tartan track for athletics and a gym built to promote and enhance sports development in the state

Doma United drew an average home attendance of 2,852 in the 2023–24 Nigeria Premier Football League.

== Athletics Program ==
On 8 July 2023 an inter-primary school athletic program held at the stadium, with participation by 1,000 primary school pupils.

== See also ==
- List of stadiums in Nigeria
- Lists of stadiums
