= Nigerian Safety Investigation Bureau =

The Nigerian Safety Investigation Bureau (NSIB), formerly the Accident Investigation Bureau (AIB), is a federal agency charged with the mandate of promoting transport safety and conducting objective and thorough investigations into transport accidents and incidents in Nigeria, with the aim of identifying the probable causes and advocating for safety improvements based on the findings. It is headquartered on the premises of Nnamdi Azikiwe International Airport in Abuja.

The agency reports to the President of Nigeria through the Federal Minister of Aviation. In December 2023, Alex Badeh Junior replaced Akin Olateru as Director General and Chief Executive Officer of the agency.

== History ==
Previously the Ministry of Aviation Civil Aviation Department investigated aircraft accidents. In 1989, the Federal Civil Aviation Authority (FCAA) was formed, and the Civil Aviation Department of the MOA became the FCAA Department of Safety Services. During the same year the Accident Investigation Bureau (AIB), subordinate to the Ministry of Aviation, was established, and the FCAA no longer had accident investigation responsibilities.

The name of the bureau was later changed to the Accident Investigation and Prevention Bureau. As part of the Civil Aviation Act of 2006, the AIB became an autonomous agency and renamed Accident Investigation Bureau. In September 2020 the Federal Executive Council approved the establishment of AIB Training School in Nigeria.

Alex Badeh Jr. is the Director General and Chief Executive Officer of the NSIB. Prior to his appointment as the DG/CEO oF NSIB, he worked as a Pilot for the American Airlines.
