= Nnamdi Azikiwe International Airport =

International airport serving Abuja, Nigeria

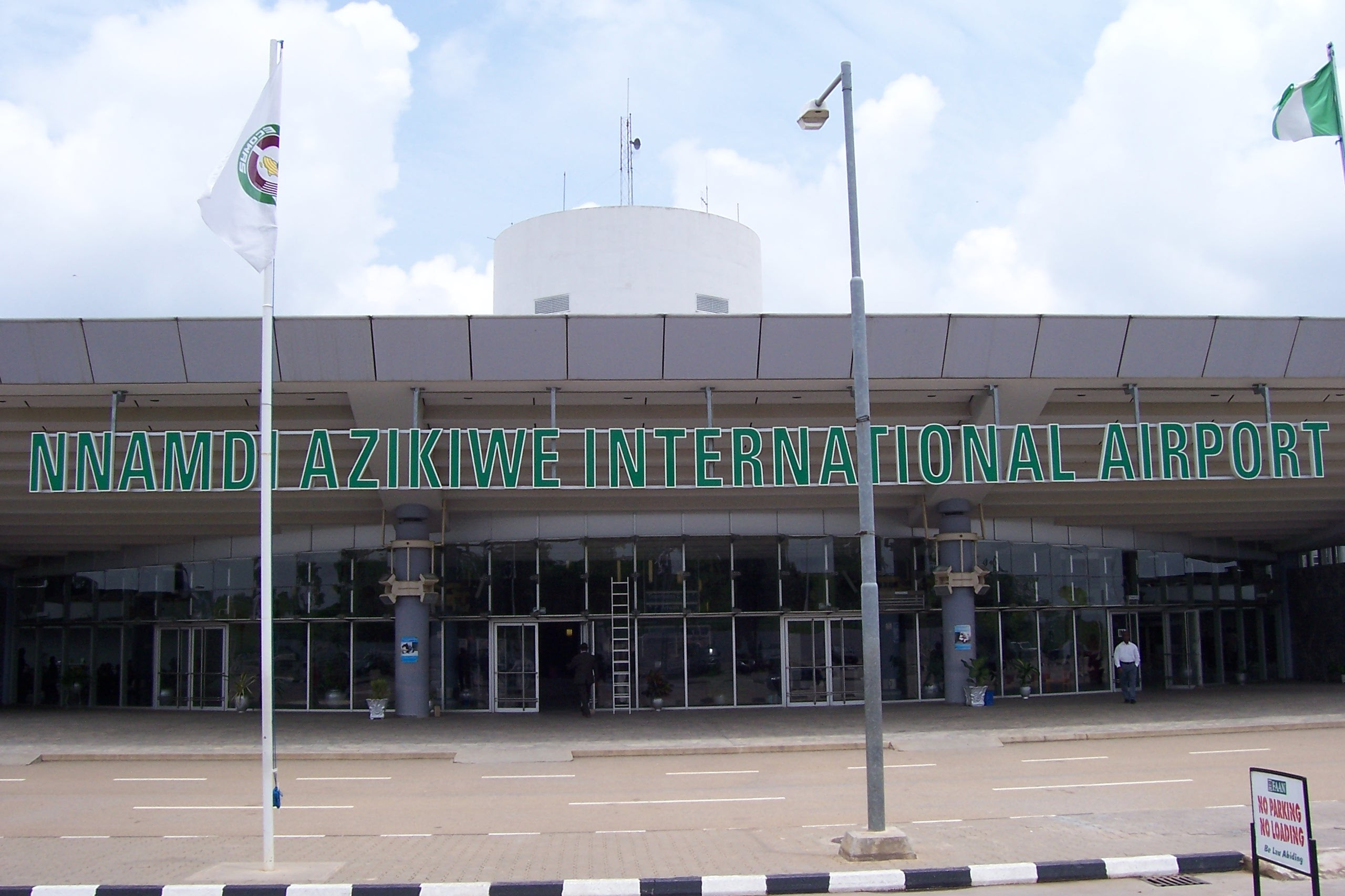
- IATA: ABV; ICAO: DNAA

Summary
- Airport type: Public
- Owner/Operator: Federal Airports Authority of Nigeria (FAAN)
- Serves: Abuja
- Hub for: Aero Contractors; Arik Air; Air Peace; Ibom Air; Overland Airways
- Time zone: WAT (UTC+01:00)
- Elevation AMSL: 1,123 ft (342 m)
- Coordinates: 9°00′24″N 7°15′47″E
- Website: faan.gov.ng/naia-abuja/

Map
- Location of the airport in Nigeria

Runways
Direction	Length		Surface
Direction	m	ft	Surface
04/22	3,610	11,844	Asphalt

Statistics (2024)
- Passengers: 5,480,000
- Aircraft movements: 77,909
- Cargo (Metric tonnes): 9,130
- Sources: Nairametrics WAD GCM Google Maps

Nnamdi Azikiwe International Airport (IATA: ABV, ICAO: DNAA) is an international airport serving Abuja, in the Federal Capital Territory of Nigeria. It is the main airport serving the Nigerian capital city and was named after Nigeria's first President, Nnamdi Azikiwe (1904–1996). The airport is approximately 20 km (12 mi) southwest of the city centre, and has an international and a domestic terminal that share its single runway.

== History ==
A new airport terminal was built in 2000 by Julius Berger, located near the existing terminal that served both domestic and international flights. The new terminal opened in 2002 and serves international flights. The existing terminal now serves domestic flights.

In November 2006, the Abuja Gateway Consortium signed a US$101.1 million contract for the management of the airport over the next 25 years. The contract included the construction of an airport hotel, private car parks, shopping malls, and a bonded warehouse, totaling US$50 million during its first five years, and additionally an upfront payment of US$10 million. According to the business plan, total investments would have amounted to US$371 million during the period of the contract. However, then-President Yar'Adua revoked the contract in April 2008.

In June 2009, Delta Air Lines began a route to New York City via Dakar. The following June, the carrier introduced seasonal nonstop service to New York. It was reported in 2012 that Delta had suspended flights to Abuja due to the high cost of fuel and diminished passenger counts.

Plans were invited for the construction of a second runway. The contract was awarded to Julius Berger Construction Company for US$423 million, but was revoked due to the high cost. The Federal Government approved fresh bids for the construction of the second runway.

On 4 January 2017, Nigeria's Federal Executive Council backed the Ministry of Aviation's decision to close the airport for six weeks to enable repairs on the runway, which was said to be dysfunctional. The Nigerian government also approved N1 billion for the conclusion of the Kaduna Airport terminal, which had been debated as an alternative for Abuja Airport. Several airport users, including the Nigerian Senate, opposed the planned closure. It was believed that the closure of the airport would cause hardship for international and local air travellers alike.

On 8 March 2017, the Federal Airport Authority in Nigeria stated that the airport will shut to commercial traffic for at least six weeks to bring needed repairs to the runway. On 18 April 2017, the airport was reopened following the completion of the project.

On 20 December 2018, President Muhammadu Buhari commissioned a new terminal building. The Federal Airports Authority of Nigeria says the newly completed terminal building can process up to 15 million passengers annually.

== Other facilities ==
The Nigerian Safety Investigation Bureau (NSIB) has its head office on the airport grounds.

The Nigerian Civil Aviation Authority (NCAA) has its head office on the airport. Previously the agency had its Abuja office on the airport grounds, though before that it had the authority's head office.

The airport operates a private jet wing that serves businesses, diplomats and politicians in the city. In 2016, the Ministry of Transportation announced plans for a new terminal for private jet operations. The General Aviation Terminal project will cost N258 million naira and will include a new protocol lounge and rehabilitation of the fire station at the airport. It will serve non-scheduled flights.

== 2017 runway reconstruction ==
In 2017, the Nigerian Government awarded a contract to Julius Berger for the emergency rehabilitation of the airport's only runway. It had been built to last for 20 years but had been in use for nearly 40 years at that time. The airport's runway was starting to show signs of fatigue and disrepair. The Airport was closed for 6 weeks, and flights were diverted to neighboring Kaduna airport. The Airport reopened with the completion of the Runway on 17 April 2017, 2 days ahead of schedule.

== Airlines and destinations ==
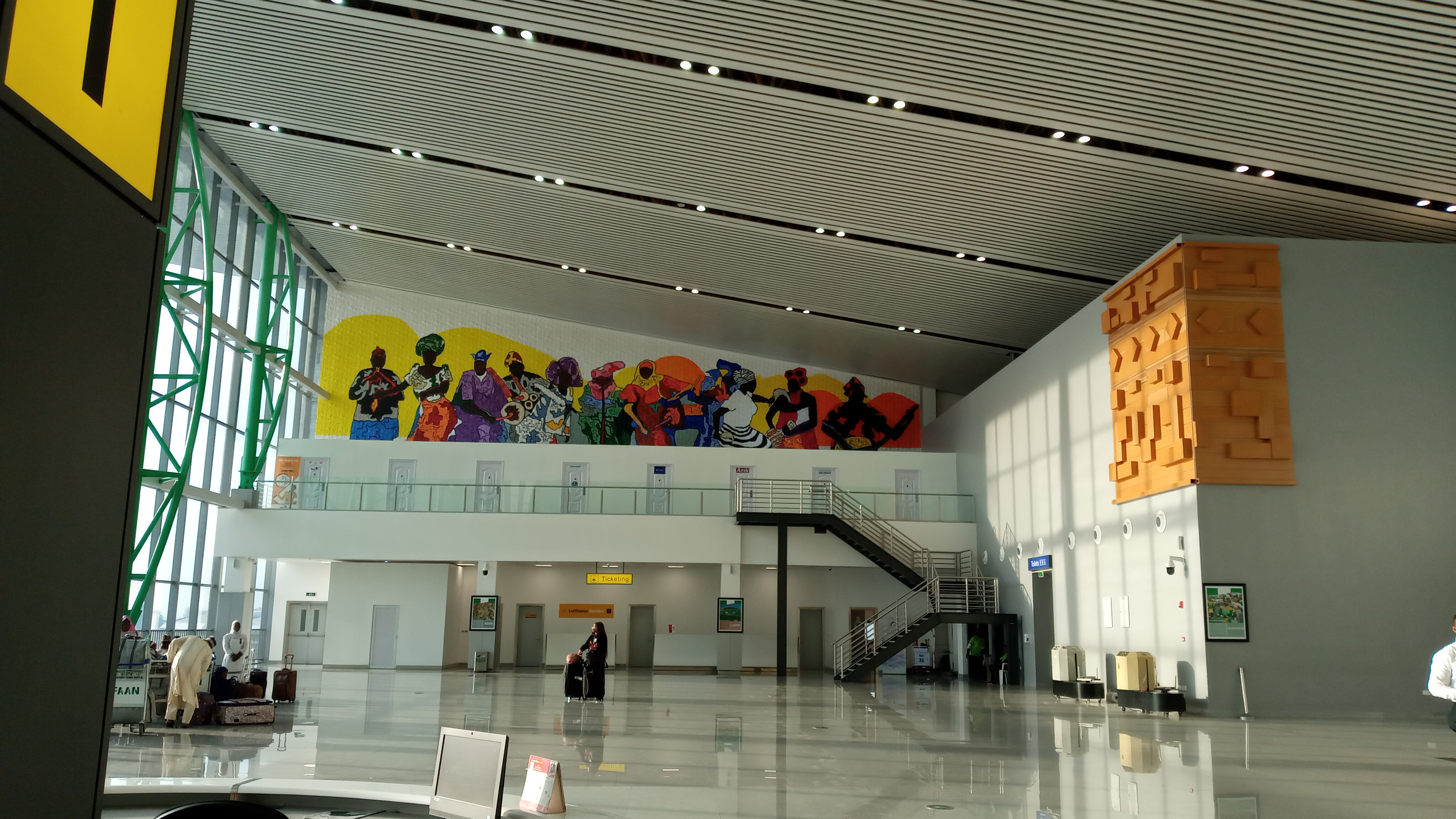
Interior of the new Airport terminal

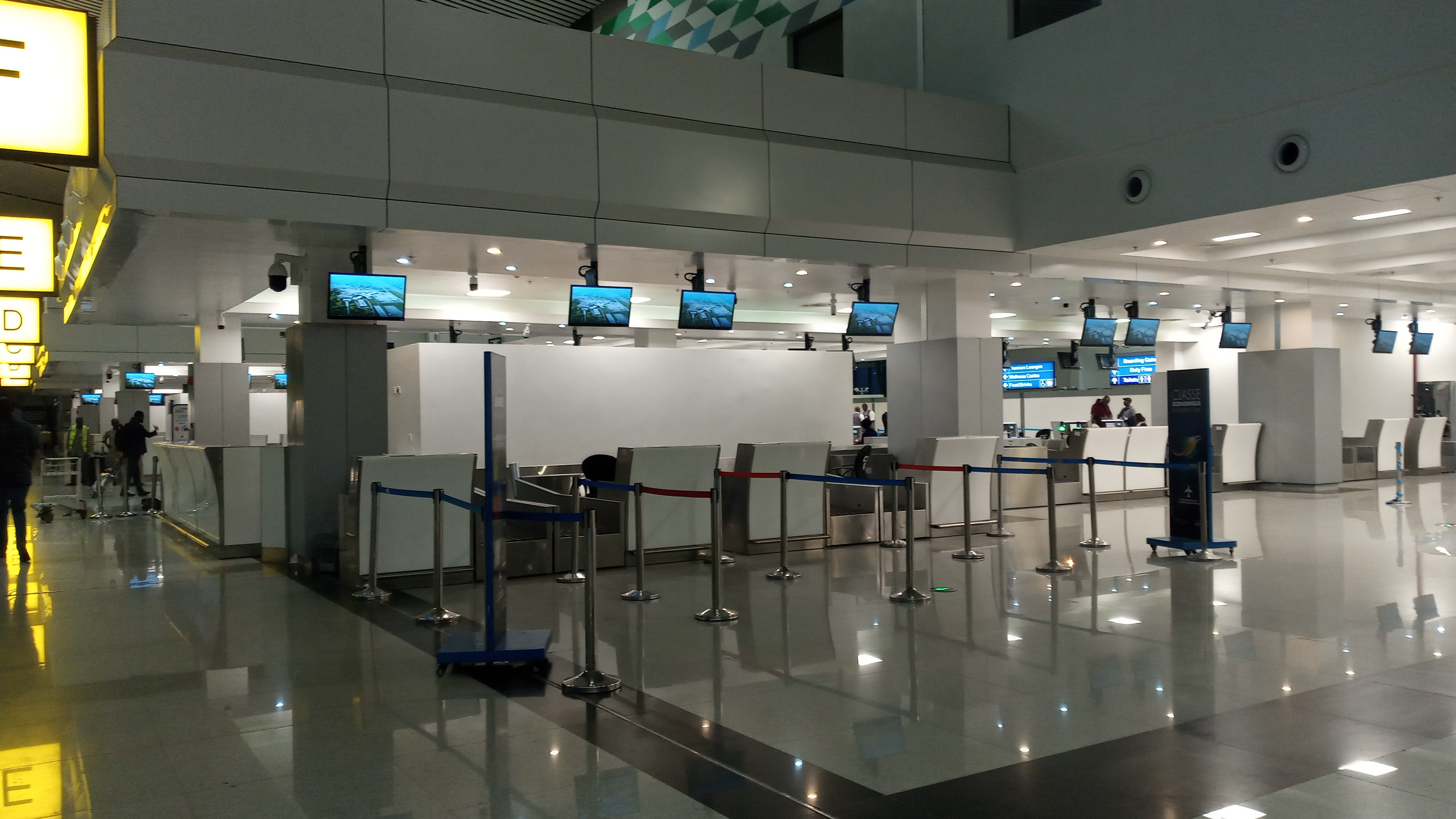
Check-in area of the new Airport terminal

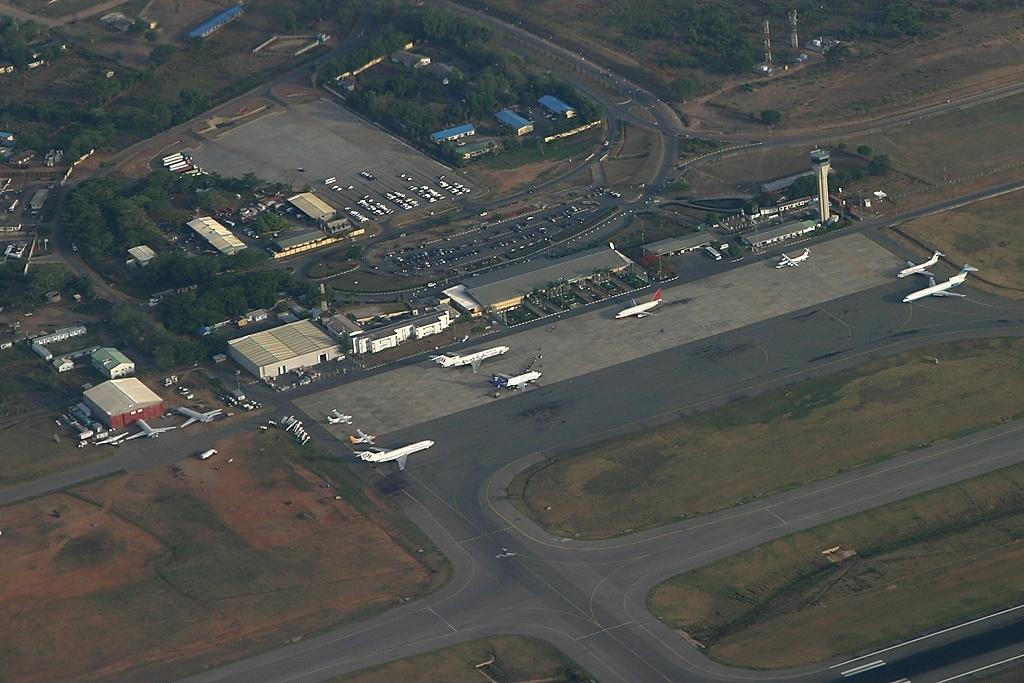
Private Jet wing of the Airport

Airlines	Destinations
Air Algérie	Algiers
Air France	Paris–Charles de Gaulle
Air Peace	Ibadan, London–Gatwick, London–Heathrow, Niamey
ASKY Airlines	Lomé
Egyptair	Cairo
Emirates	Dubai–International (suspended)
Ethiopian Airlines	Addis Ababa
Qatar Airways	Doha
Royal Air Maroc	Casablanca
Turkish Airlines	Istanbul
Uganda Airlines	Entebbe
United Nigeria Airlines	Accra

== Statistics ==
These data show number of passengers movements into the airport, according to the Federal Airports Authority of Nigeria's (FAAN) Aviation Sector Summary Reports.

Year	2011	2012	2013	2014	2015	2016	2017	2018	2019	2020	2021
Passengers	4,216,147	3,679,224	3,945,897	4,169,676	4,341,637	4,230,090	3,560,622	4,879,066	5,554,302	3,880,283	5,323,905
Growth (%)	▲7.48%	▼12.73%	▲7.25%	▲5.67%	▲4.12%	▼2.59%	▼15.83%	▲37.03%	▲13.83%	▼30.24%	▲37.23%
Source: Federal Airports Authority of Nigeria (FAAN). Aviation Sector Reports (2010-2013, 2014, Q3-Q4 of 2015, and Q1-Q2 of 2016)

== Accidents and incidents ==
- On 29 October 2006, ADC Airlines Flight 053 crashed into a corn field on takeoff from Abuja. 96 of the 105 people on board died.
- On 21 February 2021 a Nigerian Air Force Beechcraft B300 King Air 350i crashed shortly after takeoff while attempting to return to the airport. All seven on board died.

== See also ==
- Transport in Nigeria
- List of airports in Nigeria
- List of the busiest airports in Africa
