= List of Nigeria Airways destinations =

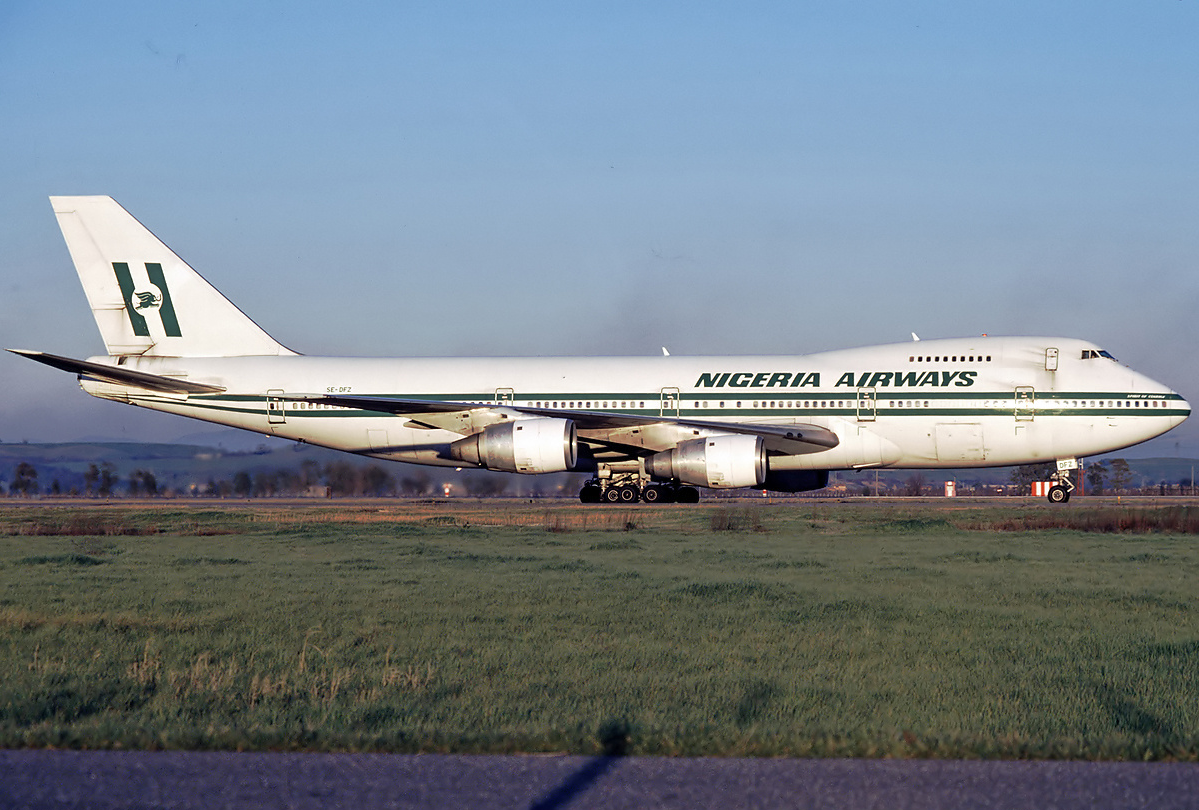
A Nigeria Airways Boeing 747-200BM at Fiumicino Airport, Rome in 1988

Nigeria Airways was founded on 23 August 1958. It succeeded the folded West African Airways Corporation (WAAC), and was initially named WAAC Nigeria. The company took over the WAAC assets and liabilities and started operations on 1 October 1958. In association with Pan American Airways (PAA), the Lagos–New York City route was opened in October 1964 using PAA's DC-8 and Boeing 707 aircraft.

WAAC Nigeria changed its name to Nigeria Airways in 1971. The carrier was wholly owned by the Government of Nigeria for almost its entire life. The airline ceased operations in 2003.

== List ==
Following is a list of destinations Nigeria Airways flew to all through its history as part of its scheduled services. The list includes the name of each city served, the country name, and the name of the airport served along with both its associated International Air Transport Association three-letter code (IATA airport code) and the International Civil Aviation Organization four-letter code (ICAO airport code). Airline hubs and focus cities, as well as destinations served at the time of closure, are also marked.

^{†}	Hub
^{‡}	Focus city
^{#}	Destination served at the time of closure

City	Country	IATA	ICAO	Airport	Refs
Abidjan	Côte d'Ivoire	ABJ	DIAP	Port Bouet Airport ^{#}	
Abuja	Nigeria	ABV	DNAA	Nnamdi Azikiwe International Airport ^{#}	
Accra	Ghana	ACC	DGAA	Accra International Airport	
Amsterdam	Netherlands	AMS	EHAM	Amsterdam Airport Schiphol	
Athens	Greece	ATH	LGAT	Ellinikon International Airport	
Banjul	Gambia	BJL	GBYD	Yundum International Airport	
Barcelona	Spain	BCN	LEBL	El Prat Airport	
Beirut	Lebanon	BEY	OLBA	Beirut–Rafic Hariri International Airport	
Benin	Nigeria	BNI	DNBE	Benin Airport	
Brussels	Belgium	BRU	EBBR	Zaventem Airport	
Calabar	Nigeria	CBQ	DNCA	Margaret Ekpo International Airport	
Cologne	Germany	CGN	EDDK	Cologne Bonn Airport	
Conakry	Guinea	CKY	GUCY	Conakry International Airport	
Cotonou	Benin	COO	DBBB	Cadjehoun Airport	
Dakar	Senegal	DKR	GOOY	Léopold Sédar Senghor International Airport	
Douala	Cameroon	DLA	FKKD	Douala International Airport	
Dubai	United Arab Emirates	DXB	OMDB	Dubai International Airport ^{#}	
Enugu	Nigeria	ENU	DNEN	Akanu Ibiam International Airport	
Frankfurt	Germany	FRA	EDDF	Frankfurt am Main Airport	
Freetown	Sierra Leone	FNA	GFLL	Lungi International Airport	
Geneva	Switzerland	GVA	LSGG	Cointrin Airport	
Gusau	Nigeria	QUS	DNGU	Gusau Airport	
Ibadan	Nigeria	IBA	DNIB	Ibadan Airport	
Ilorin	Nigeria	ILR	DNIL	Ilorin International Airport	
Jeddah	Saudi Arabia	JED	OEJN	King Abdulaziz International Airport ^{#}	
Johannesburg	South Africa	JNB	FAJS	OR Tambo International Airport	
Jos	Nigeria	JOS	DNJO	Yakubu Gowon Airport	
Kaduna	Nigeria	KAD	DNKA	Kaduna Airport	
Kano	Nigeria	KAN	DNKN	Mallam Aminu Kano International Airport ^{‡} ^{#}	
Karachi	Pakistan	KHI	OPKC	Jinnah International Airport	
Kinshasa	Democratic Republic of the Congo	FIH	FZAA	N'djili Airport	
Lagos	Nigeria	LOS	DNMM	Murtala Muhammed International Airport ^{†} ^{#}	
Libreville	Gabon	LBV	FOOL	Libreville International Airport	
Lomé	Togo	LFW	DXXX	Lomé-Tokoin Airport	
London	United Kingdom	LGW	EGKK	Gatwick Airport ^{#}	
London	United Kingdom	LHR	EGLL	Heathrow Airport ^{#}	
Luanda	Angola	LAD	FNLU	Quatro de Fevereiro Airport	
Lusaka	Zambia	LUN	FLLS	Lusaka International Airport	
Madrid	Spain	MAD	LEMD	Barajas Airport	
Maiduguri	Nigeria	MIU	DNMA	Maiduguri International Airport	
Makurdi	Nigeria	MDI	DNMK	Makurdi Airport	
Monrovia	Liberia	ROB	GLRB	Roberts International Airport	
Nairobi	Kenya	NBO	HKJK	Jomo Kenyatta International Airport	
New York	United States	JFK	KJFK	John F. Kennedy International Airport ^{#}	
Niamey	Niger	NIM	DRRN	Diori Hamani International Airport	
Port Harcourt	Nigeria	PHC	DNPO	Port Harcourt International Airport ^{‡} ^{#}	
Rome	Italy	FCO	LIRF	Leonardo da Vinci-Fiumicino Airport	
Sokoto	Nigeria	SKO	DNSO	Sadiq Abubakar III International Airport	
Tiko	Cameroon	TKC	FKKC	Tiko Airport	
Yola	Nigeria	YOL	DNYO	Yola Airport	
Zürich	Switzerland	ZRH	LSZH	Kloten Airport	
