= West African Airways Corporation =

Airline from 1946 to 1958

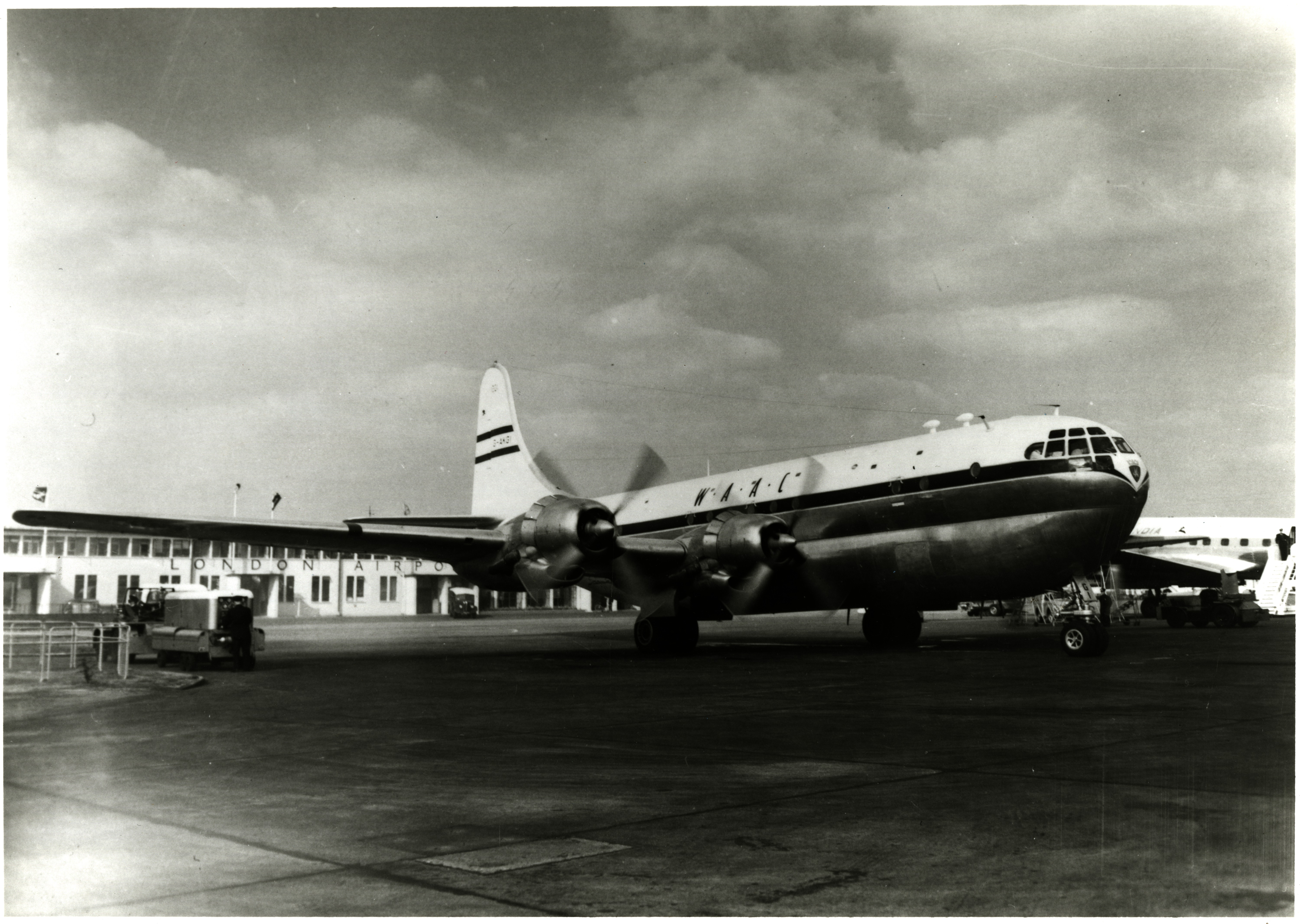
IATA	ICAO	Call sign
WT	—	—
- Founded: 1946
- Commenced operations: October 1947
- Ceased operations: 30 September 1958
- Hubs: Murtala Muhammed International Airport
- Focus cities: Accra International Airport
- Parent company: Government of Nigeria (68%)
- Headquarters: Ikeja, Nigeria

West African Airways Corporation, or WAAC for short, was an airline that operated from 1946 to 1958, jointly owned by the governments of Britain's four west African colonies, namely The Gambia, the Gold Coast (now Ghana), Nigeria, and Sierra Leone. The carrier was headquartered at the Airways House in Ikeja, Nigeria, and operated from its hub at Lagos Airport. It was dissolved on 30 September 1958, after all the shareholder countries but Nigeria set up their own national airlines following their independence. As the sole remaining major stockholder of the airline, the government of Nigeria continued to operate it as WAAC Nigeria, which was eventually renamed Nigeria Airways and became the flag carrier of the country until its closure in 2003.

== History ==
Prospections for the development of aviation in the British West African Territory trace as far back as 1944 when, following World War II, Lord Swinton ordered the first studies. The British Ministry of Civil Aviation supported the Sanford Committee, which was established to that particular end, and both entities recommended the formation of the West African Air Transport Authority. The order-in-council enacting the formation of the West African Air Transport Authority (ATA) was signed by King George VI on 15 May 1946.

The origins of West African Airways Corporation can be traced back to 1946, when it was established by the British Overseas Airways Corporation (BOAC), and economically supported by four West African British colonies, Nigeria being the major shareholder (68%), followed by the Gold Coast (29.5%), Sierra Leone (2%), and The Gambia holding the balance. It began operations in October 1947, following the delivery of its first aircraft, an event that took place on 14 September 1947. The De Havilland Dove aircraft inaugurated WAAC's first scheduled service from Lagos to Calabar during October 1947.

The company was aimed at providing the British West Africa with air transport facilities, to connecting it with Dakar and Khartoum in order to provide passengers with a gateway to the Americas and the Middle East, respectively, and to operating feeder flights that connected with the Europe-bound BOAC Hermes services at Accra, Lagos and Kano. The close ties with BOAC were evidenced by WAAC being an agent for BOAC in Nigeria and the Gold Coast.

On 31 March 1948 WAAC became responsible for operation of the inter-Colonial West African coastal services and extended operation to Freetown, Bathurst and Dakar. The airline began a Lagos-Khartoum service with Bristol 170s in April 1950. This was suspended in August 1953.

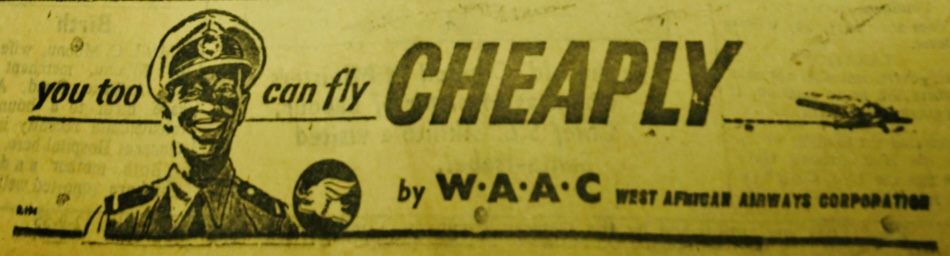
An advertisement for WAAC

WAAC became very popular in the early 1950s for offering at least four Bristol Freighter-operated second-class services at discounted airfares, cheaper than any other mean of transportation. Two of them were the "Coastal Flyer", that covered the 250 miles (400 km) between Accra and Lagos in 1 3/4 hours for £4 at 1951 prices, and the "Hausa Flyer" that covered the Accra–Lagos–Ibadan–Jos–Kano route, for which the Lagos–Kano leg took 4 hours —against an almost two-day journey by train— and was £3 (1951 prices) cheaper than the train.

As the member states gained Commonwealth status from the United Kingdom, they set up their own carriers—Ghana Airways, Sierra Leone Airways, and Gambia Air Shuttle. WAAC was formally dissolved in 1958, as Nigeria was the only state eventually having a participation in the airline. WAAC assets and liabilities were inherited by WAAC (Nigeria), that operated as "Nigerian Airways" effective 1 October 1958. WAAC (Nigeria) was later rebranded Nigeria Airways.

=== Livery ===
The WAAC livery consisted of a green cheatline bordered by thinner gold lines. An airborne green elephant named Skypower (Note: The flying elephant was an icon of air transport all through West Africa. It was adopted by Nigeria Airways as its logo, whose name appears in an article regarding this airline.) was painted in a golden circle background at both sides, in the forward part of each aircraft.

== Destinations ==
Following is a list of destinations served by WAAC, grouped by country served. Each destination is provided with the city served, the name of the airport and both its International Air Transport Association three-letter code (IATA airport code) and its International Civil Aviation Organization four-letter code (ICAO airport code). Current names have been adopted wherever possible.

City	Airport name	Refs
Cameroon
Tiko	Tiko Airport	
Ivory Coast
Abidjan	Port Bouet Airport	
Gambia
Bathurst	Yundum International Airport	
Ghana
Accra	Accra International Airport	
Kumasi	Kumasi Airport	
Takoradi	Takoradi Airport	
Tamale	Tamale Airport	
Liberia
Monrovia	Robertsfield	
Nigeria
Benin	Benin Airport	
Bida	Bida Airstrip	
Calabar	Calabar Airport	
Enugu	Enugu Airport	
Gusau	Gusau Airstrip	
Ibadan	Ibadan Airport	
Jos	Jos Airport	
Kaduna	Kaduna Airport	
Kano (city)	Mallam Aminu Kano International Airport	
Lagos	Murtala Muhammed International Airport	
Maiduguri	Maiduguri International Airport	
Makurdi	Makurdi Airport	
Oshogbo	Osogbo Airstrip	
Port Harcourt	Port Harcourt International Airport	
Sokoto	Sadiq Abubakar III International Airport	
Yola	Yola Airport	
Zaria	Zaria Airport	
Senegal
Dakar	Yoff Airport	
Sierra Leone
Freetown	Lungi International Airport	
Sudan
El Geneina	Geneina Airport	
Khartoum	Khartoum International Airport	

== Fleet ==
WAAC was the first airline in operating Marathons commercially. The corporation operated the following aircraft throughout its history:

- Bristol Freighter
- Bristol Wayfarer
- de Havilland Dove
- de Havilland Heron
- Douglas DC-3
- Handley Page Marathon

== Accidents and incidents ==
According to Aviation Safety Network, the airline experienced two accidents/incidents throughout its history, one of them leading to fatalities.

=== Fatal accidents ===
- 5 February 1955: A Bristol 170 Freighter 21E, registration VR-NAD, that was operating a domestic scheduled Enugu Airport–Calabar Airport passenger service, crashed into a hillside 84 kilometres (52.2 mi) northwest of Calabar after it uncontrollably descended from about 4,000 feet (1,200 m). All 13 occupants of the aircraft were killed. Structural failure of the left-hand side mainplane was officially determined to be the cause of the accident.

=== Non-fatal hull-losses ===
- 27 July 1951: A Bristol 170 Freighter 21E, registered VR-NAX, landed short of the runway at Kaduna Airport.

== See also ==
- Airlines of Africa
- Transport in Gambia
- Transport in Ghana
- Transport in Nigeria
- Transport in Sierra Leone

== Footnotes ==
=== Bibliography ===
- Guttery, Ben R. (1998). Encyclopedia of African Airlines. Jefferson, NC: McFarland & Company. ISBN 0-7864-0495-7.
- Stroud, John (1962). Annals of British and Commonwealth Air Transport. Putnam & Company Limited.
