= List of airports in Nigeria =

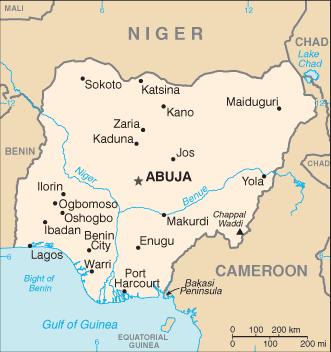
Map of Nigeria

This is a list of airports in Nigeria, grouped by type and sorted by location.

Nigeria has 36 airports, most of which are operated by the Federal Airports Authority of Nigeria (FAAN), and 13 of which are functional international airports. It also has a state-owned airport located in Akwa Ibom State. In addition, there are airstrips or airfields scattered around the country, built mainly by the Nigerian Air Force and multinational oil companies. Nigeria has only one private-public partnership airport, operated by Bi-Courtney Aviation Services Ltd - Murtala Muhammed Airport Two.

== Airports ==
Airport names shown in bold have scheduled passenger service on commercial airlines.

City served	State	ICAO	IATA	Airport name	Airlines	Destinations
International airports						
Abuja	Federal Capital Territory	DNAA	ABV	**Nnamdi Azikiwe International Airport**	8	25
Uyo	Akwa Ibom	DNAI	QUO	**Victor Attah International Airport**	2	7
Anambra	Anambra	DNAN	ANA	**Chinua Achebe International Airport**	N/A	N/A
Calabar	Cross River	DNCA	CBQ	**Margaret Ekpo International Airport**	2	3
Ebonyi	Ebonyi	DNEB		**Ebonyi State International Airport**	N/A	N/A
Enugu	Enugu	DNEN	ENU	**Akanu Ibiam International Airport**	2	3
Ilorin	Kwara	DNIL	ILR	**General Tunde Idiagbon International Airport**	1	1
Kaduna	Kaduna	DNKA	KAD	Kaduna International Airport	2	1
Kano	Kano	DNKN	KAN	**Mallam Aminu Kano International Airport**	6	7
Lagos	Lagos	DNMM	LOS	**Murtala Muhammed International Airport**	27	43
Port Harcourt	Rivers	DNPO	PHC	**Port Harcourt International Airport**	7	2
Iperu-Remo	Ogun	DNGA	GWI	**Gateway International Airport**	1	2
Sokoto	Sokoto	DNSO	SKO	**Sadiq Abubakar III International Airport**	1	1
Major domestic airports						
Asaba	Delta	DNAS	ABB	**Asaba International Airport**	N/A	N/A
Bauchi	Bauchi	DNBC	BCU	**Sir Abubakar Tafawa Balewa Airport** (Bauchi State Airport)	N/A	N/A
Benin	Edo	DNBE	BNI	**Benin Airport**	1	2
Calabar	Cross River	DNCA	CBQ	**Margaret Ekpo International Airport**	1	2
Ibadan	Oyo	DNIB	IBA	**Ibadan Airport**	1	1
Jos	Plateau	DNJO	JOS	**Yakubu Gowon Airport**	1	1
Maiduguri	Borno	DNMA	MIU	**Maiduguri International Airport**	2	1
Owerri	Imo	DNIM	QOW	**Sam Mbakwe International Cargo Airport (SMICA)**	1	2
Uyo	Akwa Ibom	DNAI	QUO	**Victor Attah International Airport**	1	1
Yola	Adamawa	DNYO	YOL	**Yola Airport**	1	1
Lafia	Nassarawa	-	-	Lafia Cargo Airport	N/A	N/A
Other domestic airports						
Akure	Ondo	DNAK	AKR	**Akure Airport**	N/A	N/A
Gombe	Gombe	DNGO	GMO	**Gombe Lawanti International Airport (Sani Abacha Int'l.)**	1	1
Birnin Kebbi	Kebbi	DNBK		**Kebbi International Airport (Sir Ahmadu Bello Int'l.)**	N/A	N/A
Dutse	Jigawa	DNDS		**Dutse International Airport**	N/A	N/A
Jalingo	Taraba	DNJA		**Jalingo Airport** (Danbaba Danfulani Suntai Airport)	N/A	N/A
Katsina	Katsina	DNKT	DKA	**Katsina Airport**	N/A	N/A
Makurdi	Benue	DNMK	MDI	Makurdi Airport	N/A	N/A
Minna	Niger	DNMN	MXJ	**Minna Airport**	N/A	N/A
Warri	Delta	DNSU	QRW	**Osubi Airport (Osubi Airstrip)**	1	2
Yenagoa	Bayelsa			**Bayelsa International Airport**	N/A	N/A
Zaria	Kaduna	DNZA	ZAR	Zaria Airport	N/A	N/A
Damaturu	Yobe			Damaturu Cargo Airport	N/A	N/A
Airstrips						
Ajaokuta	Kogi	DN51		Ajaokuta Airstrip	N/A	N/A
Azare	Bauchi			Azare Airstrip	N/A	N/A
Bacita	Kwara			Bacita Airstrip	N/A	N/A
Bajoga	Gombe	DN54		Bajoga Northeast Airport	N/A	N/A
Bebi	Cross River			Bebi Airstrip	N/A	N/A
Bida	Niger	DNBI		Bida Airstrip	N/A	N/A
Eket	Akwa Ibom	DNEK/DN55		Eket Airstrip	N/A	N/A
Escravos	Delta	DN56		Escravos Airstrip	N/A	N/A
Gusau	Zamfara	DNGU	QUS	Gusau Airstrip	N/A	N/A
Nguru	Yobe			Nguru Airstrip	N/A	N/A
Potiskum	Yobe			Potiskum Airstrip	N/A	N/A
Shiroro	Niger	DN50		Shiroro Airstrip	N/A	N/A
Tuga	Kebbi			Tuga Airstrip	N/A	N/A
Military airports						
Katsina	Katsina	DN57	-	Katsina Air Force Base	N/A	N/A
Makurdi	Benue	DNMK	MDI	Makurdi Air Force Base	N/A	N/A
Port Harcourt	Rivers	DNPM	PHG	Port Harcourt NAF Base	N/A	N/A
Kaduna	Kaduna	DN53	-	Kaduna Air Force Base	N/A	N/A

== See also ==
- Transport in Nigeria
- Nigerian Aviation Handling Company
- List of airports by ICAO code: D#DN - Nigeria
- Wikipedia: WikiProject Aviation/Airline destination lists: Africa#Nigeria
