= Nigeria Airways =

National airline of Nigeria (1958–2003)

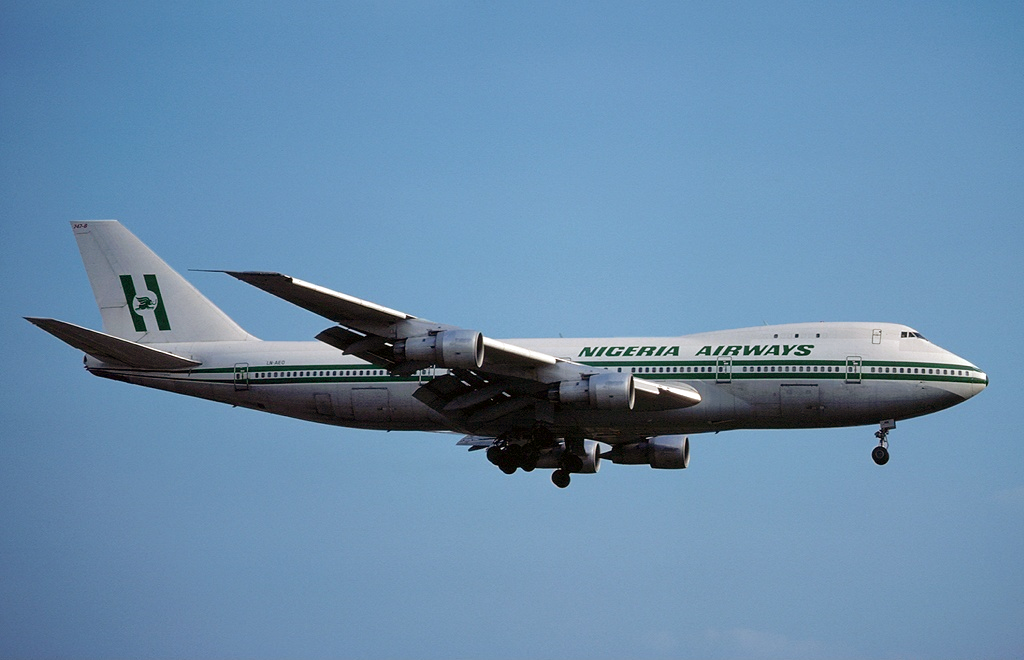
- A Boeing 747-200 of Nigeria Airways
IATA	ICAO	Call sign
WT	NGA	NIGERIA
- Founded: 23 August 1958 (after the dissolution of WAAC
- Commenced operations: 1 October 1958
- Ceased operations: 2003
- Hubs: Murtala Muhammed International Airport
- Secondary hubs: Mallam Aminu Kano International Airport
- Focus cities: Port Harcourt International Airport
- Fleet size: 1 serviceable in 2003
- Destinations: 9 (at the time of closure)
- Parent company: Government of Nigeria (100%)
- Headquarters: Abuja, CT, Nigeria (at the time of closure)
- Key people: Peter Gana (CEO) (at the time of closure)

Nigeria Airways Ltd., more commonly known as Nigeria Airways, was the national airline of Nigeria. The company was founded in 1958 after the dissolution of West African Airways Corporation (WAAC). It held the name West African Airways Corporation Nigeria (WAAC Nigeria) until 1971, when it was renamed, until it ceased operations in 2003. The government of Nigeria owned a majority of the airline (51%) until 1961, when it boosted its shareholding in the company to 100% and made it the country's flag carrier. At the time of dissolution, the airline's headquarters were at Airways House in Abuja. Operations were concentrated at Murtala Muhammed International Airport and served both domestic and international destinations mainly concentrated in West Africa; the network also had points in Europe, North America and Saudi Arabia. The airline was managed by a number of foreign companies, including British Airways, KLM and South African Airways.

Nigeria Airways had its heyday in the early 1980s, just before the departure of a KLM team that had been hired to make the airline efficient and profitable. At that time, its fleet consisted of about 30 aircraft, but the carrier was two years behind with its accounts to the extent that aircraft were acquired for cash. Owned or leased, the carrier operated a variety of aircraft during its history, including the Vickers VC10, the Airbus A310, the Boeing 737 and 747 and the McDonnell Douglas DC-10, of which it flew the last one ever built. Plagued by mismanagement, corruption, and overstaffing, at the time of closure the airline had debts totalling US$528 million (equivalent to US$860 million in 2025), a poor safety record, and its operative fleet comprised a single aircraft flying domestic routes as well as two leased aircraft operating the international network. Nigeria Airways was succeeded by Virgin Nigeria, and the ground facilities were taken over by Arik Air.

== History ==
=== Early years ===
The airline came into being on 23 August 1958 under the name West African Airways Corporation Nigeria Limited (WAAC Nigeria), also known as Nigerian Airways, to succeed the folded West African Airways Corporation (WAAC); the title "WAAC" was retained due to the prestige this company had previously earned. Initially, the carrier was a tripartite entity in which the Nigerian government was the major shareholder (51%), and Elder Dempster Lines and British Overseas Airways Corporation (BOAC) held the balance (32 2/3 and 16 1/3, respectively). WAAC Nigeria inherited some aircraft previously owned by WAAC. Operations started on 1 October 1958, with a BOAC Boeing 377 Stratocruiser operated on behalf of the new airline linking London Heathrow with Lagos, and Douglas DC-3s flying domestic services and a run to Dakar, the last one in conjunction with Ghana Airways. On the same day, WAAC Nigeria signed a 15-year agreement with BOAC to charter Stratocruisers and Bristol Britannias for serving long-haul flights between Nigeria and the United Kingdom. The contract also contemplated that these routes would be operated in a pool agreement, whereby tickets could be issued by one airline for flights operated by the other, with the revenues being shared.

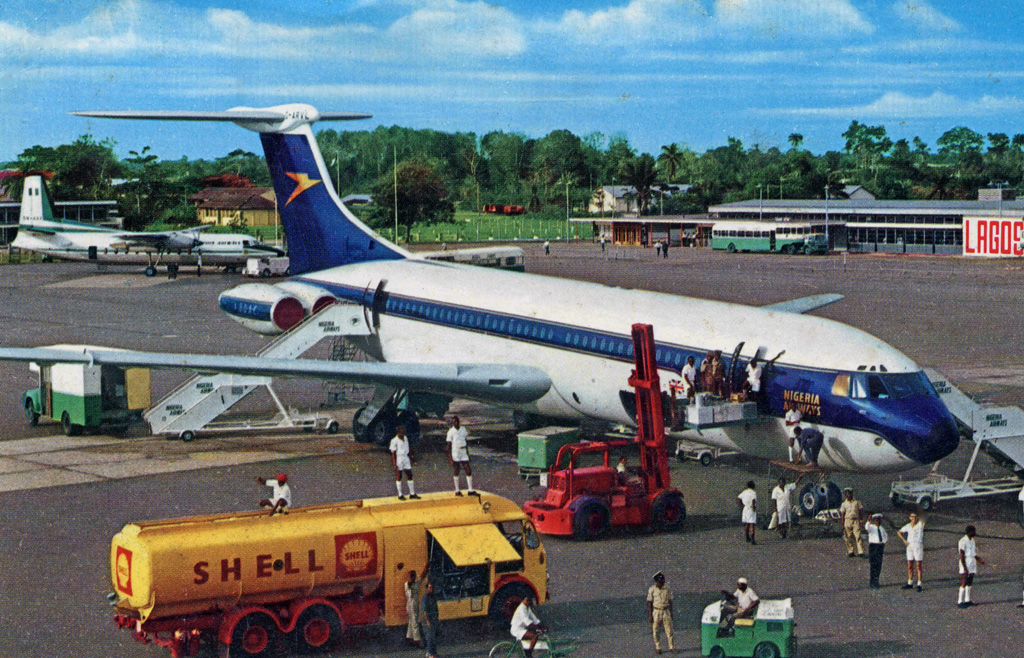
A Nigeria Airways Vickers VC-10, leased from BOAC, at Ikeja Airport in 1969. A company Fokker Friendship is in the background.

In April 1960, the fleet comprised one de Havilland Dove, eight de Havilland Herons and eight Douglas DC-3s. In early 1961, Nigeria became the only owner of the company by buying the shares held by BOAC and Elder Dempster; the airline became the flag carrier of the country. The entire Heron fleet was withdrawn from service in March 1961 as it proved economically unviable. Aimed at replacing the DC-3 fleet, five Fokker Friendship 200s were ordered late that year, with options being taken on two more. A BOAC Comet 4 inaugurated the jet services between Nigeria and London on 1 April 1962; the flight was operated in conjunction with Nigeria Airways. The Friendships joined the fleet between January and May 1963, and were deployed on regional routes, including those that served Abidjan, Accra, Bathurst, Dakar, Freetown and Robertsfield. The contract with BOAC was revised and a new agreement was signed in April of the same year. By June, the DC-3s had begun to be replaced by the Friendships on routes to Gambia, Ghana, Ivory Coast, Liberia, Senegal, Sierra Leone, and Leopoldville. However, the type would continue to be deployed on the Kano–Cotonou–Lomé–Accra passenger service and the Lagos-Kano freighter route. BOAC subsequently operated Vickers VC-10 services on behalf of Nigeria Airways from April 1964 until an aircraft of the type was acquired from the British state airline in October 1969; the airplane was destroyed in an accident in November that year. The first air link between Nigeria and the United States was launched in early October 1964. Called "Operation Fantastic", it linked Lagos with New York and was operated by Pan Am using Boeing 707s and Douglas DC-8s, but an agreement between both countries allowed Nigeria Airways to sell a limited number of seats on these flights.

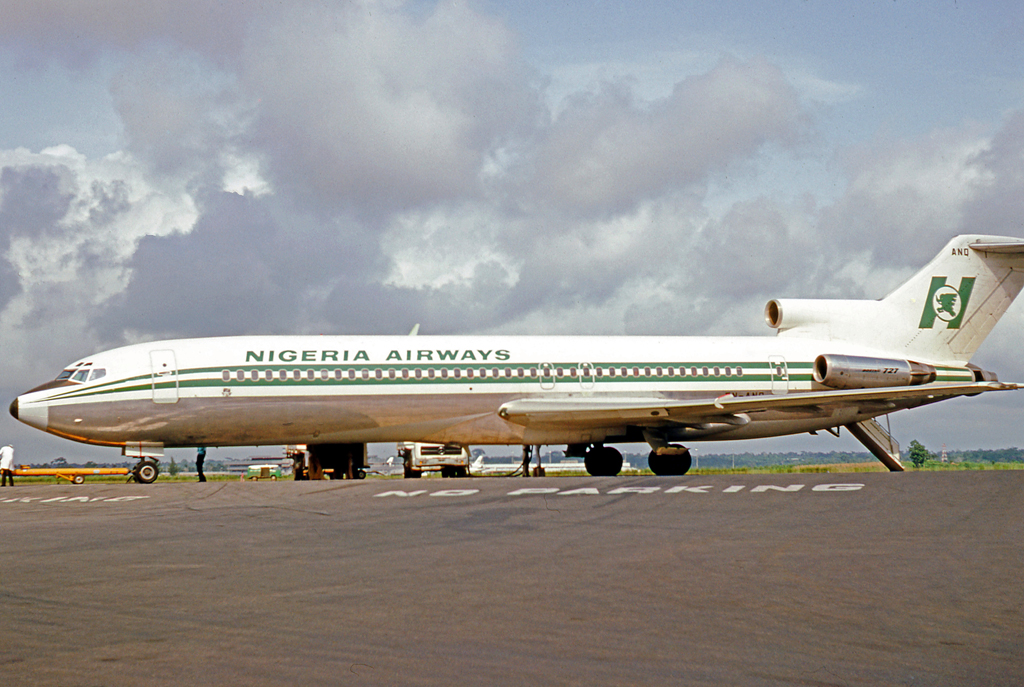
A Nigeria Airways Boeing 727-200 on the domestic apron at Lagos Ikeja Airport in June 1980. The type was first ordered in 1976.

The number of employees was 2,191 at March 1970. At this time, the fleet comprised one Piper Aztec, one Douglas DC-3 and six Fokker F27s that worked on a domestic network and regional routes that extended west, as far as Dakar, operated in a pool agreement with Ghana Airways; the European list of destinations included Frankfurt, London, Madrid and Rome, all of them served with VC10s chartered from BOAC. On 22 January 1971, the company was rebranded as Nigeria Airways. At this time the airline used aircraft leasing as a common practice: Boeing 707s that flew the Lagos–London route were leased from Laker Airways and Ethiopian Airlines until a new Boeing 707-320C was incorporated into the fleet and deployed on the route in August 1971, and in October 1971 a Boeing 737 was leased from Aer Lingus. Another Boeing 707-320C was ordered in 1972, along with two Boeing 737-200s. A Boeing 707 was leased from Aer Lingus in April 1972 for deployment mainly on the Lagos–London route, with the provision of crew and maintenance. In October 1972, a Fokker F28 entered the fleet on a lease agreement with Fokker, and later on aircraft of this type were ordered. In late 1972, a contract for management assistance was signed with Trans World Airlines, with the American carrier providing specialists in different managerial, commercial, and financial fields for five years, but the contract was never exercised. Nigeria Airways took delivery of three Boeing 707s in February 1973; they were put into service on the Lagos–London run immediately. Two Boeing 737s, with registrations 5N-ANC and 5N-AND, were delivered in the early 1970s.

=== Golden years ===
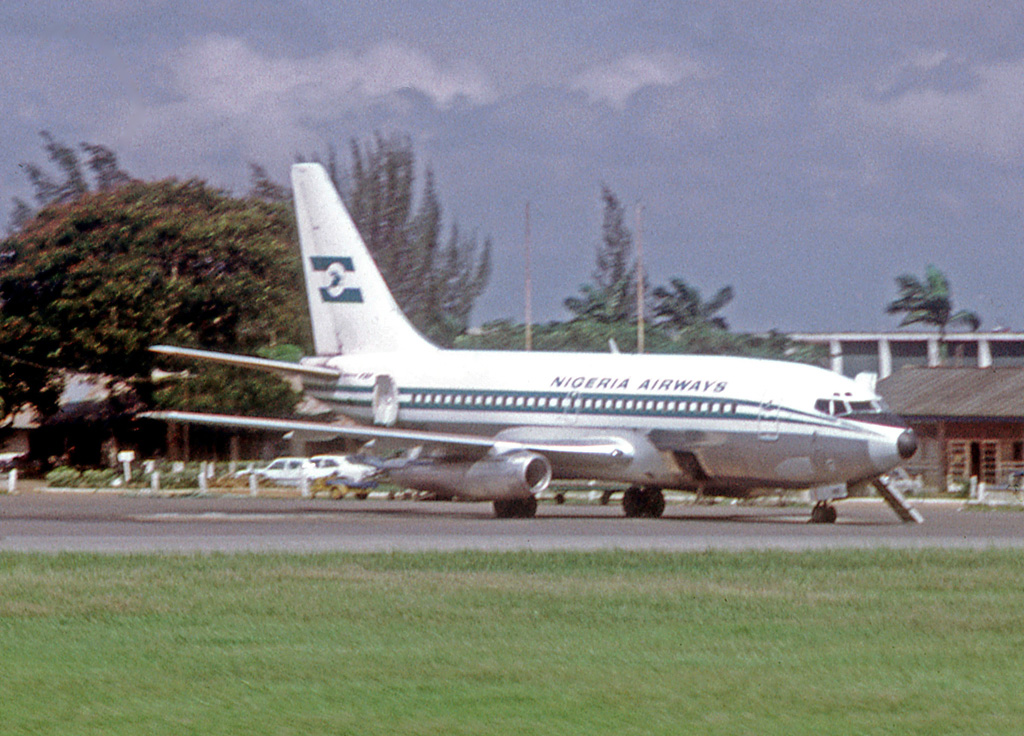
A Nigeria Airways Boeing 737-200 at the domestic apron at Ikeja Airport in July 1974. The type was first delivered to the airline in January 1973.

In March 1975 the workforce was 2,400 strong and the fleet consisted of two Boeing 707-320Cs, two Boeing 737-200s, three Fokker F28s, five Fokker F27s, and one Piper Aztec, while five F28-2000s were on order. The route network at this time comprised domestic destinations served from Kano and Lagos, and international routes to Abidjan, Amsterdam, Accra, Bathurst, Beirut, Brussels, Dakar, Douala, Frankfurt, Freetown, London, Madrid, Monrovia, New York, Paris and Rome. In October 1976, the company became the 83rd customer for the Boeing 727, when an order for two Boeing 727-200s and another Boeing 707-320C was placed; it also took possession of a Douglas DC-10-30. This DC-10 was a 300-seater, all-economy aircraft that operated between Nigeria and Saudi Arabia. At this time the carrier took possession of two more 707s. A second DC-10-30 was ordered in early 1977. On 25 April 1977 an F-27, 5N-AAW, had an accident in Sokoto when it overran the runway, and on 1 March 1978 an F-28 (5N-ANA) had a fatal accident near Kano, killing all 16 occupants of the aircraft plus two more people on the ground. An order for two F28-4000s, that would complement the six F28-2000s the airline had in operation, was placed in late 1978. A contract similar to the one signed with TWA in 1972 was signed with KLM in September 1979, this time for a period of two years. It was mostly aimed at training Nigeria Airways' employees in airline management in order to make the airline efficient and profitable.

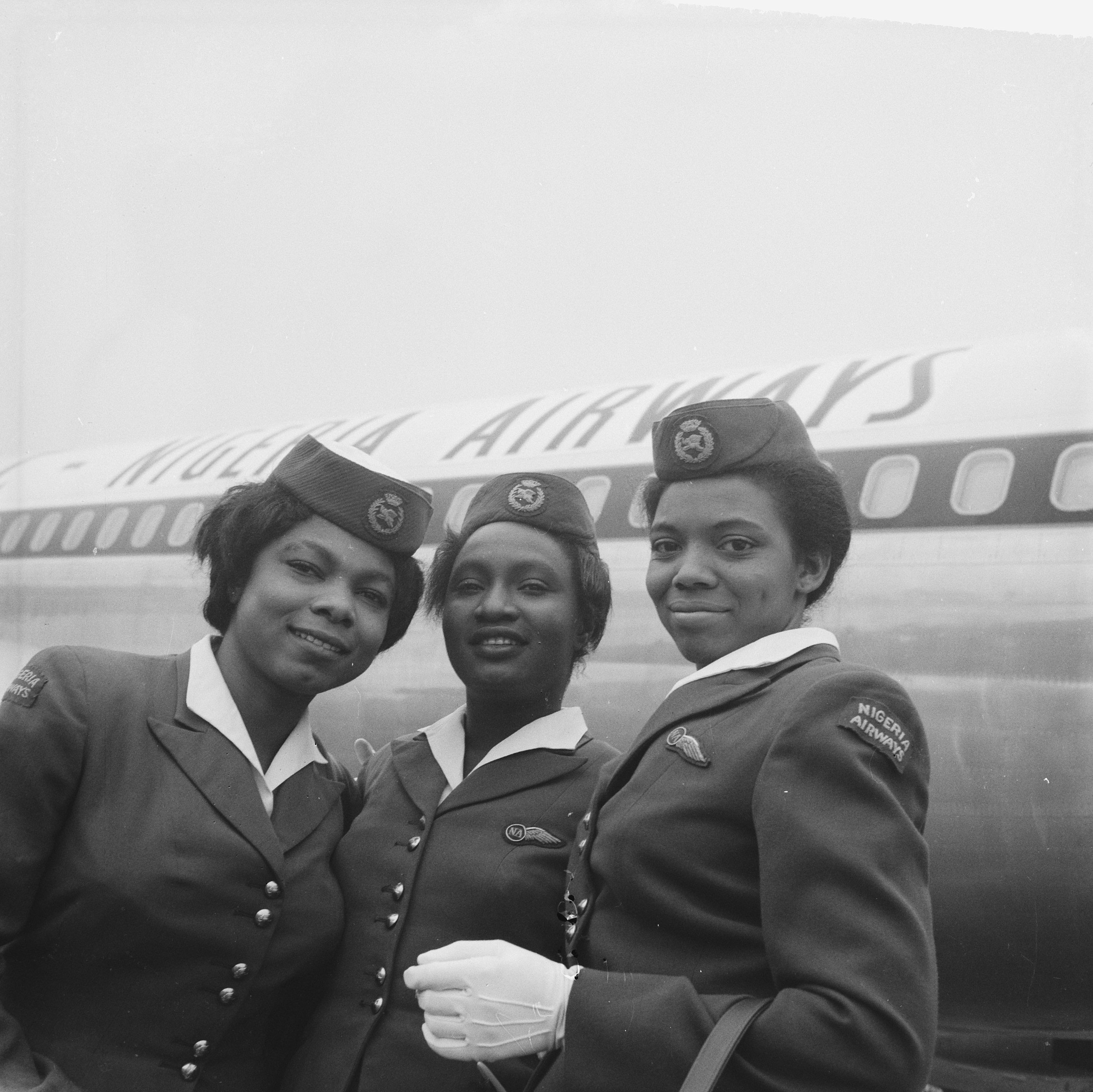
Nigeria Airways flight attendants at Amsterdam Airport Schiphol, 1962

A service to Jeddah was launched in 1980. By July 1980, the fleet consisted of 26 aircraft, split into three Boeing 707-320Cs, two Boeing 727-200s, two Boeing 737-200s, two DC-10-30s, two F27-200s, two F27-400Ms, four F27-600s, six F28-2000s, two F28-4000s, and one Aztec. The two DC-10s were purchased for cash. Nigeria Airways became Airbus' 40th customer in 1981, when it placed an order for four Airbus A310-200s. Four new Boeing 737-200s were ordered in early 1981 for US$65 million (equivalent to US$230 million in 2025) including spare parts, and late that year an order for four more aircraft of the type was placed. In 1982, Boeing 747s were successively leased from the Danish charter airline Scanair and SAS; the aircraft were deployed on services to the United Kingdom, permitting the DC-10s to be used on new routes to Frankfurt, Paris, and Zürich. The airline took possession of four new Boeing 737-200s in early 1983 that would replace leased aircraft of the same type; they were acquired with a loan of US$70 million that was arranged with seven major banks. On 28 November 1983, a Fokker F28 (5N-ANF) crashed while on approach to Enugu, claiming 23 lives from the 72 people on board. Following this accident the carrier decided to withdraw its Fokker fleet from service. A military coup d'état that took place in the last day of 1983 changed the structure of the government and the airline: Bernard Banfa was appointed managing director and many of the staff trained by KLM were dismissed. The 225-seater A310-200s were incorporated into the fleet in late 1984 and early 1985. Three of these aircraft bore the names Rima River, River Ethiope and Lekki Peninsula. The fleet was 22 strong in March 1985, comprising two DC-10-30s, four Airbus A310s, three Boeing 707-320Cs, two Boeing 727-200s, ten Boeing 737-200s, and one Boeing 737-200C; two Boeing 737-200s were on order and the carrier had 9,096 employees at this time.

=== Demise ===
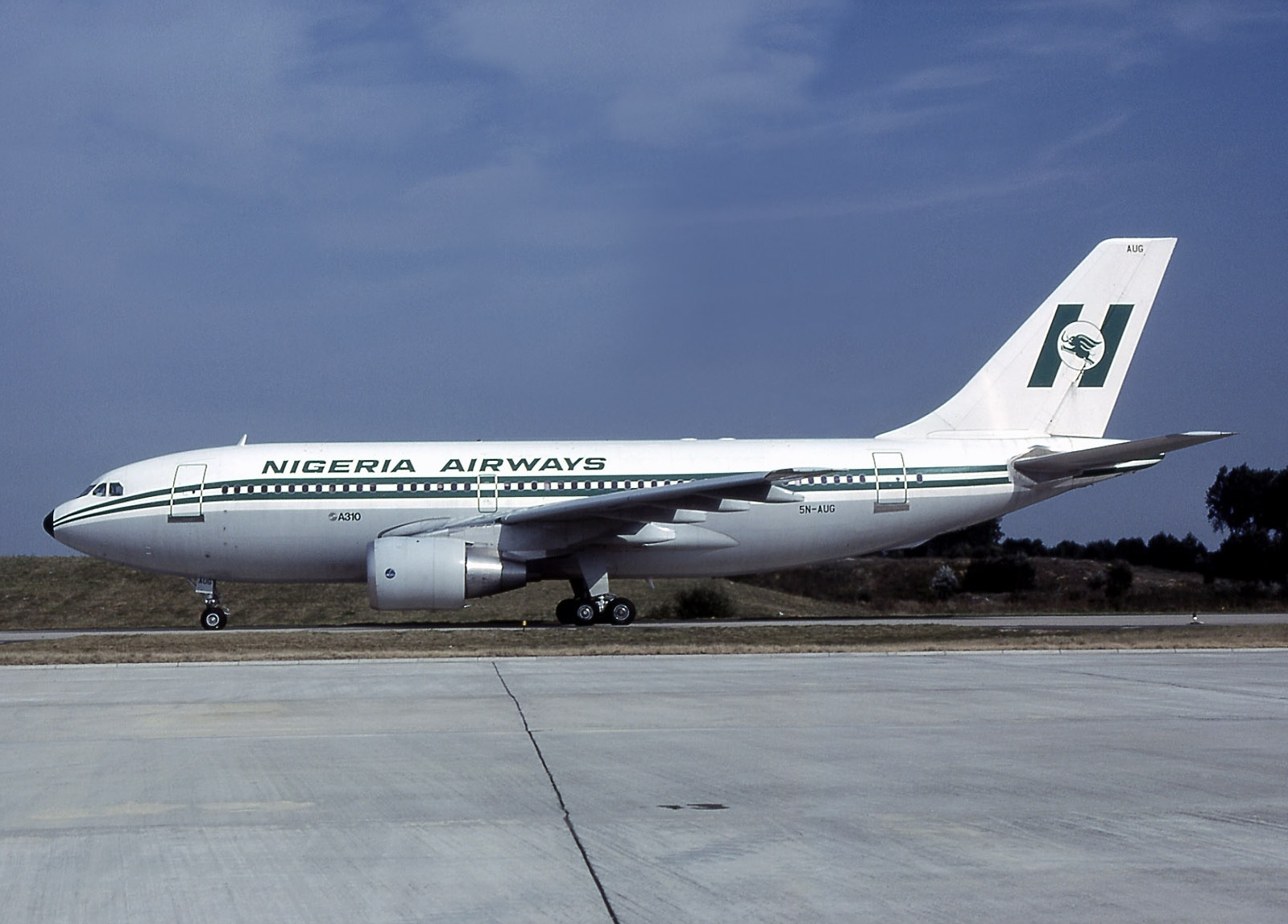
A Nigeria Airways Airbus A310-200 at Paris Charles de Gaulle Airport in 1985. The type had been incorporated into the fleet in 1984.

The introduction of unregulated IMF policies, alongside corruption, (Note: In 2003, Transparency International rated Nigeria as the second most corrupt country in the world, after Bangladesh.) mismanagement and overstaffing, led to a steady decline of Nigeria Airways from the 1980s. The carrier had accumulated significant debts that outstripped its revenues from the mid-1980s, to the extent that aircraft were detained or impounded for unpaid debts. The International Air Transport Association (IATA) suspended Nigeria Airways in early 1987 from the clearing house (which meant the airline could not issue tickets to fly on other IATA member airlines and the converse) for accumulated debts of US$1,100,000 (equivalent to $3,117,311 in 2025). In late 1987 the airline had debts for approximately US$250,000,000, with a revenue of US$5,000,000 per month and expenditure of approximately US$5,175,000 a month. This situation prompted the airline to increase its domestic and international fares by 100% and 20%, respectively, in order to raise funds to alleviate the deficit, but this measure reduced the passenger traffic. Even though 1,000 jobs had been cut by late 1986 and 1,700 in the course of the previous year, Nigeria ordered the airline to further downsize (the number of employees was 8,500 at the time—or 500 for each aircraft in the fleet, twice the international average—) and to reduce or discontinue unprofitable routes. In 1988, cost-cutting measures led to the discontinuance of flights to a number of African destinations, including Cotonou, Dakar, Douala, Kinshasa, Monrovia and Nairobi, and to the transfer of some routes to the privately owned airline Okada Air; some of these routes were resumed a year later. In December 1988 the airline dismissed 3,000 employees, a third of the workforce, in an effort to keep operations afloat. In the late 1980s the airline lost a deposit worth US$350,000 for not firming up an order for six ATR-42s. Financed by a Japanese leasing company, the carrier phased in the last DC-10 ever built; the aircraft was delivered in 1989, and replaced an aircraft of the same type that was lost in an accident two years earlier.

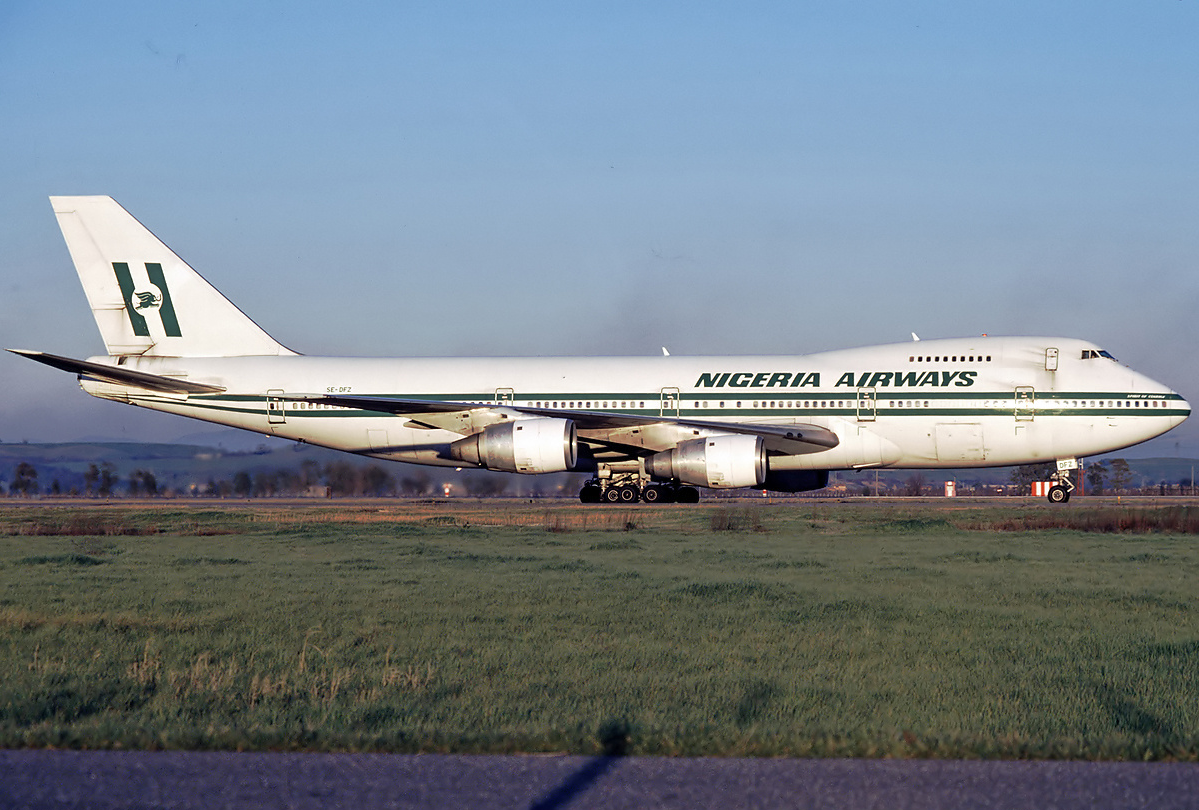
A Boeing 747-200BM in Nigeria Airways livery at Leonardo da Vinci-Fiumicino Airport in 1988. This aircraft was leased from Scandinavian Airlines.

With a payroll of 6,632 at March 1990, the airline had a fleet of three Airbus A310-200s, three Boeing 707-320Cs, eight Boeing 737-200s and two DC-10-30s. A large domestic network serving the 19 Nigerian states was operated, as well as routes to East and West Africa; intercontinental flights from Lagos to Amsterdam, Jeddah, London, New York and Rome, from Kano to Amsterdam, Jeddah, London and Rome, and from Port Harcourt to London were also undertaken. The carrier suffered a major accident on 11 July 1991, when all 261 people on board a Douglas DC-8-61, registration C-GMXQ, died when it crashed near Jeddah. In 1992, Nigeria Airways had three Boeing 707s impounded in Europe, and the number of flights experienced a 32% reduction following the termination of services to Conakry, Freetown and Robertsfield (Monrovia). Privatisation was first considered in 1993 with a proposal to split Nigeria Airways in two companies, one bearing the same name and operating domestic routes and a new one named Air Nigeria, which would undertake the international operations. In July 1994, an Airbus was impounded at London Heathrow Airport owing to a debt worth £100,000. On 21 December of the same year, a Boeing 707, registration 5N-ABK, crashed near Hadejia on a freighter flight from Jeddah, killing three of a crew of five. Further staff reductions continued throughout the first half of the 1990s, and at September 1995 the airline had 4,500 employees. In 1997 the UK Civil Aviation Authority banned the airline from operating into its territory citing safety concerns; in return, the Nigerian government barred British Airways from operating in the country. The service was restored in 1998 when the carrier began codesharing with British Airways, deploying a leased Boeing 747-200 that wore a Nigeria Airways livery and was operated on the Lagos–London Heathrow route with mixed English and Nigerian crews. By the late 1990s, the Nigerian government decided the carrier would be privatised by selling 40% and 20% to foreign and local investors, respectively, and keeping the rest of the shares. In 1999, the International Finance Corporation (IFC) was commissioned by the Nigerian government to assist in the process of restructuring and privatisation of the airline. Among three options, one of them was to partner with a large European airline; Air France, British Airways, Lufthansa, Swissair and Virgin Atlantic were all considered. Another alternative was to liquidate the carrier.

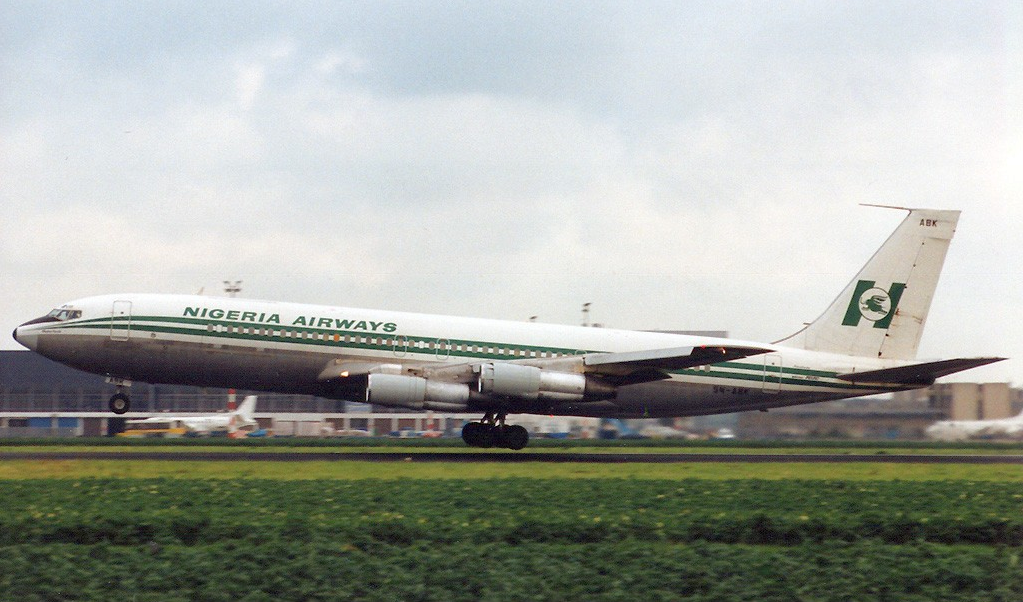
A Nigeria Airways Boeing 707-320C at Amsterdam Schiphol Airport in 1990. With registration 5N-ABK, this particular aircraft crashed in December 1994.

At April 2000, the number of employees was 4,516. At this time, an Airbus A310-200, three Boeing 737-200 Advanced, one Boeing 747-200B Combi and one McDonnell Douglas DC-10-30 served a route network that included Abuja, Calabar, Douala, Dubai, Jeddah, Jos, Kaduna, Kano, Kinshasa, Lagos, Libreville, London, Maiduguri, Malabo, Port Harcourt, Sokoto and Yola. A fleet that had numbered 32 aircraft in 1984 (Note: According to Flight International, at March 1984 the aircraft park totalled 31, including one Boeing 747-200, one Boeing 747-200 Combi, two McDonnell Douglas DC-10s, two Airbus A310s, three Boeing 707-320Cs, two Boeing 727-200s, 12 Boeing 737-200s, one Boeing 737-200C, Fokker F-28-2000s and two Fokker F-28-4000s.) had gradually reduced to just three aircraft in October 2000. The United Kingdom cited safety concerns again in 2001 when it refused to allow Nigeria Airways to operate the Lagos–London route, this time regarding the Boeing 747 that was leased from Air Djibouti to fly the route. That year, the IFC withdrew from its advisory position citing the unwillingness of both the company and the government to carry out the necessary measures that would make the airline attractive to potential investors. Later on, there were various allegations claiming the airline's failure was accelerated by former Nigerian rulers who looted and mismanaged the company, to the extent that the government started an investigation into the disappearance of more than US$400 million between 1983 and 1999. Launched in February 2001, a joint venture between Nigeria Airways and South African Airways that mostly relied upon the Johannesburg–Lagos–New York route was unilaterally terminated by the South African carrier in March 2002 citing a decline in passenger numbers and a deficit of US$4,900,000.

In May 2003, when Nigeria Airways had a Boeing 737-200 as its sole serviceable aircraft, the government decided not to pump more money into the overstaffed carrier but to liquidate it. The decision was based on the declining performance of the airline's last 15 years of operations and on the carrier's debts. The number of carried passengers had fallen from 2,1 million in 1985 to just 10,000 in the first quarter of 2003, and it controlled just 6% and 1% of the domestic and the international markets, respectively. The carrier owed over US$528 million, despite the government having injected US$200 million into the company in its last decade of operations. The airline ceased operations in 2003 and was liquidated a year later. The Nigerian government later came to an agreement with Virgin Atlantic to found Virgin Nigeria, intended as a replacement. Even though Virgin Nigeria succeeded Nigeria Airways, the ground facilities of the folded Nigeria Airways were eventually taken over by the then-startup carrier Arik Air.

== Corporate affairs ==
Nigeria Airways had its headquarters at Airways House in Abuja at the time of dissolution. It had been moved from Murtala Muhammed Airport between 1999 and 2000. The airline logo consisted of the Nigerian flag with a green elephant named Skypower in its centre. (Note: The flying elephant was an icon of air transport all through West Africa.)

== Destinations ==
At the time of closure the Nigeria Airways network consisted of four domestic destinations, namely Abuja, Kano, Lagos and Port Harcourt. The international network comprised five routes, to Abidjan, Dubai, Jeddah, London and New York.

== Fleet ==
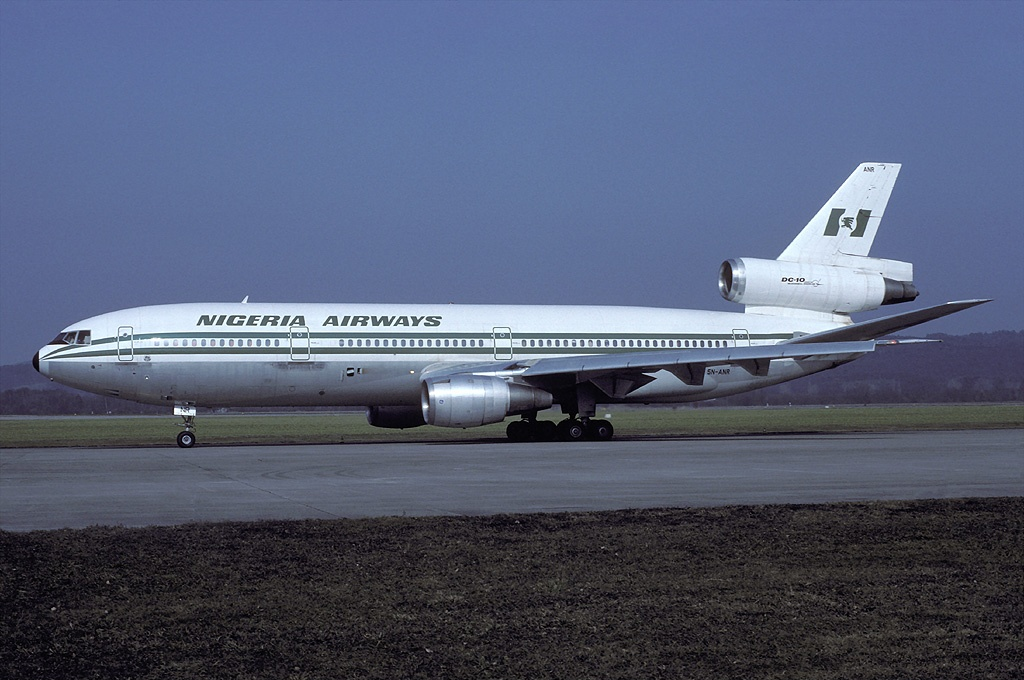
A Nigeria Airways McDonnell Douglas DC-10-30 at Zurich Airport in 1983. With registration 5N-ANR, this particular aircraft was written off after a 10 January 1987 fire while landing at Ilorin Airport that completely destroyed the airframe.

The following aircraft types were operated by Nigeria Airways during the course of its history:

- Airbus A300B4
- Airbus A310-200
- Piper Aztec
- BAC One-Eleven 400
- Boeing 377 Stratocruiser
- Boeing 707-120
- Boeing 707-120B
- Boeing 707-320
- Boeing 707-320B
- Boeing 707-320C
- Boeing 707-420
- Boeing 727-100
- Boeing 727-200
- Boeing 737-200
- Boeing 737-200 Advanced
- Boeing 737-200C
- Boeing 737-400
- Boeing 747-100
- Boeing 747-200
- Boeing 747-200B
- Boeing 747-200 Combi
- Boeing 747-200F
- Boeing 747-300
- Boeing 767-200ER
- Boeing 767-300ER
- Bristol Britannia 100
- de Havilland Comet
- Douglas C-47A
- Douglas DC-3
- Douglas DC-8-30
- Douglas DC-8-50
- Douglas DC-8-60
- De Havilland Dove
- Fokker F27-200
- Fokker F27-400
- Fokker F27-600
- Fokker F-28-1000
- Fokker F-28-2000
- Fokker F-28-4000
- de Havilland Heron
- McDonnell Douglas DC-10-10
- McDonnell Douglas DC-10-30
- Vickers VC-10
- Vickers Viscount 810

== Accidents and incidents ==
Aviation Safety Network records 16 events for the airline, eight of which led to fatalities. The worst accident experienced by the carrier took place on 11 July 1991, when 261 people were killed in an accident at King Abdulaziz International Airport. The following list includes events that had reported fatalities, there was a hull-loss of the aircraft involved, or both.

Date	Location	Aircraft	Tail number	Aircraft damage	Fatalities	Description	Refs
20 November 1969	(Nigeria) Lagos	VC-10-1101	5N-ABD	W/O	87/87	The aircraft was flying the London–Rome–Kano–Lagos route as Flight 925 when it crashed on its last leg, during approach to Ikeja International Airport, after hitting trees in low visibility. The aircraft involved had been sold to Nigeria Airways by BOAC less than two months prior to the occurrence of the accident and was operated by an experienced crew.	
4 April 1971	(Nigeria) Jos	F27-200	5N-AAX	W/O	0/41	Swerved off the runway and hit heaps of gravel at Jos Airport, following a rejected takeoff in crosswind conditions.	
19 September 1972	(Nigeria) Port Harcourt	F28-1000	PH-FPT	W/O	0	Ran off the runway upon landing at Port Harcourt Airport.	
22 January 1973	(Nigeria) Kano	Boeing 707-320C	JY-ADO	W/O	176/202	Skidded off the runway and caught fire soon after one of the two main gears collapsed on landing at Kano Airport. The aircraft was due to fly the Jeddah–Lagos route, but it was diverted to Kano because of the weather. It was chartered from Alia Royal Jordanian Airlines and operated on behalf of Nigeria Airways for the Hajj season.	
25 April 1977 (Note: There exists a discrepancy over the date of occurrence, as it was informed to be 25 Apr, or 15 May.)	(Nigeria) Sokoto	F27-200	5N-AAW	W/O	0/23	Overran the runway on landing at Sokoto Airport.	
1 March 1978	(Nigeria) Kano	F28-1000	5N-ANA	W/O	18	The aircraft was operating a domestic scheduled Sokoto–Kano service, when it collided shortly before touchdown at the destination airport with a Nigerian Air Force Mig-21U trainer. All 16 people aboard the F-28 and two persons on the Mig-21U perished.	
28 November 1983	(Nigeria) Enugu	F28-2000	5N-ANF	W/O	53/72	Crashed in poor visibility 3.3 kilometres (2.1 mi) short of the runway on a steep approach to Enugu Airport, inbound from Lagos as Flight 250. The aircraft caught fire and burned out, killing 53 occupants of the 72 occupants.	
10 January 1987	(Nigeria) Ilorin	DC-10-30	5N-ANR	W/O	0/9	Overshot the runway at Ilorin Airport on a training flight, catching fire.	
15 October 1988	(Nigeria) Port Harcourt	Boeing 737-200	5N-ANW	W/O	0/132	Overran the runway on landing in heavy rain at Port Harcourt Airport; both the nosegear and the starboard main gear collapsed.	
2 October 1989	(Nigeria) Lagos	Boeing 737-200	5N-ANX	W/O	0/135	The nosegear collapsed after overrunning the wet runway on landing at Ikeja International Airport.	
11 July 1991	(Saudi Arabia) Jeddah	DC-8-61	C-GMXQ	W/O	261/261	Caught fire and crashed shortly after take-off from King Abdulaziz International Airport. The aircraft, chartered from the Canadian company Nolisair, was flying pilgrims back to Sokoto as Flight 2120, during the Hajj season.	
25 October 1993	(Niger) Niamey	A310-200	5N-AUH	Minor	1/149	Hijacked en route from Lagos to Abuja as Flight 470. The hijackers demanded the resignation of Nigeria's government and to be flown to Frankfurt. The aircraft was denied permission to land in N'Djamena, and was diverted to the Niamey Airport for refuelling. It was stormed by Nigerien commandos four days later; the co-pilot was killed during the operation.	
19 December 1994	(Nigeria) Kiri Kasama	Boeing 707-320C	5N-ABK	W/O	3/5	Crashed near Kiri Kasama after smoke in the cockpit was reported, distracting the pilots. The aircraft was operating a cargo service between Jeddah and Kano as Flight 9805.	
13 November 1995	(Nigeria) Kaduna	Boeing 737-200	5N-AUA	W/O	11/138	The aircraft experienced a wing strike following a long, tailwind landing at Kaduna Airport, inbound from Jos as Flight 357. The starboard wing hit the ground after the aircraft slewed off the runway to the left, damaging the fuel tanks and starting a fire that completely engulfed the fuselage.	

== See also ==
- Airlines of Africa
- Transport in Nigeria

== Bibliography ==
- Guttery, Ben R. (1998). Encyclopedia of African Airlines. Jefferson, NC: McFarland & Company. ISBN 0-7864-0495-7.
