= Benue Links =

Public transport company in Benue State, Nigeria

- Trade name: Benue Links Nig. Ltd
- Company type: State-owned enterprise
- Industry: Transport
- Founded: 1988
- Founder: Benue State Government
- Headquarters: Makurdi, Nigeria
- Area served: Nationwide
- Services: Passenger transport, cargo transport
- Owner: Benue State Government
- Website: benuelinks.com

Benue Links is a state-owned road transportation company headquartered in Makurdi, Nigeria. Established in 1988, the company was launched to provide affordable transportation services to both rural and urban areas within the state. Over time, Benue Links expanded its operations and now offers nationwide services, connecting various parts of Nigeria.

== See also ==
- Makurdi Airport
- Benue State University

== Bibliography ==
- Benedict Idu, Emmanuel (January 2006). "Transport and Development: An Assessment of Benue Links Nigeria Limited". Department of Public Administration Institute of Public Administration Ahmadu Bello University, Zaria, Nigeria.
- Igbashangev, Paul Aondover (14 June 2023). "The Evaluation of the Impact of Effective Leadership and Motivation towards Enhanced Productivity in Public Organizations: A Study of Benue Links Nig. Ltd, Makurdi, Benue State, Nigeria." Ltd, Makurdi, Benue State, Nigeria". Department of Mass Communication, Bayero University, Kano.
