= Nigeria Airways Flight 9805 =

1994 plane crash in Nigeria

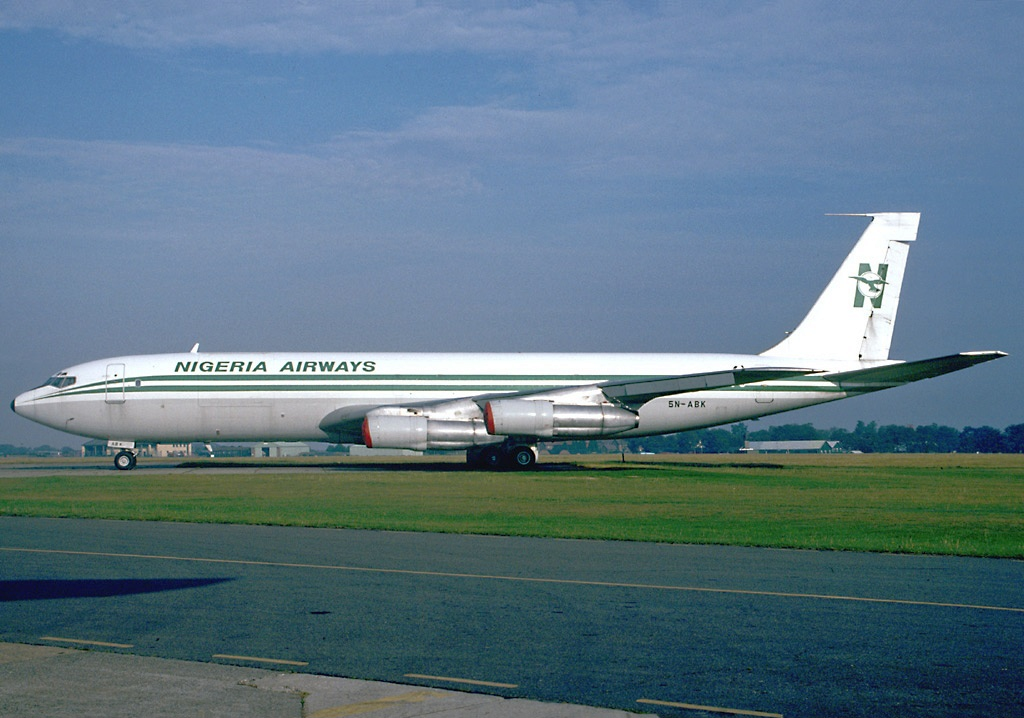
- 5N-ABK, the aircraft involved in the accident, in 1993

Accident
- Date: 19 December 1994
- Summary: In-flight fire
- Site: near Kiri Kasama, Nigeria

Aircraft
- Aircraft type: Boeing 707-3F9C
- Operator: Nigeria Airways
- IATA flight No.: WT9805
- ICAO flight No.: NGA9805
- Call sign: NIGERIA 9805
- Registration: 5N-ABK
- Flight origin: King Abdulaziz International Airport, Jeddah, Saudi Arabia
- Destination: Mallam Aminu Kano International Airport in Kano, Nigeria
- Occupants: 5
- Passengers: 2
- Crew: 3
- Fatalities: 3
- Injuries: 2
- Survivors: 2

Nigeria Airways Flight 9805 was a cargo flight from King Abdulaziz International Airport in Jeddah to Mallam Aminu Kano International Airport in Kano, Nigeria. On 19 December 1994, the Boeing 707 flying the route suffered an in-flight fire and crashed into a marshland near Kiri Kasama, Hadejia LGA, Nigeria. One of the three crew members and both passengers died. The investigation determined that a heat generating substance was the probable cause.

== Aircraft and crew ==
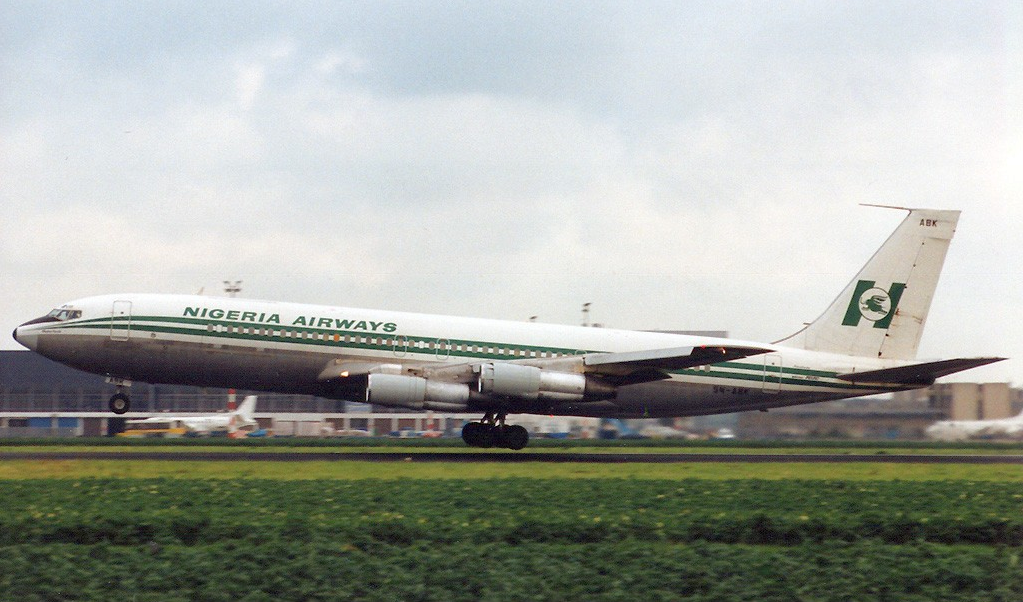
The aircraft involved in June 1990, while still in a passenger configuration

The accident aircraft was a Boeing 707-3F9C made in 1972 registered 5N-ABK to Nigeria Airways. The aircraft had 31,477 hours of flight prior to the accident. The captain had 10,917 flight hours, 3,594.5 of which on the Boeing 707. The first officer was licensed to on fly both the Boeing 707 and Boeing 727, a total of 5,201 flight hours, over 2,000 of which on the Boeing 707. The flight engineer had a total of 2,293 flight hours. At the time of the accident, the aircraft had 2.5 hours of fuel left and was carrying approximately 35 tons of cargo.

== Passengers ==
The flight was a cargo flight carrying two passengers en route to Kano, the ground engineer and the load-master, both of whom perished in the crash.

== Crash ==
The aircraft was scheduled to ferry 13 empty cargo pallets to be filled at Jeddah then returned to Kano. The flight was nearly canceled because only five pallets were loaded onto the aircraft, and the employee who had keys to the cargo pallet storage area did not report for work that day. The captain nearly cancelled the flight until arrangements were made for seven more cargo pallets to be added. The aircraft departed at approximately 17:00 UTC and arrived in Jeddah a few minutes past 22:00 UTC. The turnaround time would have normally taken an hour and a half, but it took two and a half hours since the cargo pallets had to be loaded after arrival in Jeddah. The aircraft was ready for takeoff at 00:30 UTC, but during the engine start up procedure engine number 4 would not start. Engine number 4 was repaired and the flight took off at 13:48 UTC en route to Kano and was expected at Kano at 18:19 UTC. The captain was not warned about any classified or hazardous material aboard. The flight engineer sensed a strange odor in the cockpit at flight level 35 as the aircraft approached N'Djamena, at about 17:00 UTC. The rest of the crew as well as the ground engineer and the load-master confirmed the smell had persisted for a while. The two passengers traced to odor to pallet 11 and which appeared to be misty. After being handed a fire extinguisher they applied it to the pallet and when they returned they were breathing heavily. Afterwards the smoke evacuation procedure was followed and the smell temporarily ceased. The flight was cleared to descend at 18:00 UTC. Shortly afterwards the master warning followed a minute later by the sound of a fire warning. With smoke entering the cabin, the flight went into a descent of nearly 3,000 feet (910 m) per minute. Control of the pitch trims was lost. The flight engineer started a radio transmission to the airline at 18:04:57 UTC that ended suddenly at 18:05:04, the same time the cockpit voice recordings stopped. The two survivors (the captain and flight engineer) both reported that the first explosion tripped the autopilot and the aircraft rocked sharply. The aircraft descended slowly in the grasses but rolled upon contact with the water. The aircraft then exploded a second time and was destroyed.

== Probable cause ==
According to the accident report: "The probable cause of this accident was a heat generating substance that was hidden in a cargo of fabrics inside pallet No. 11 in the cargo compartment of the aircraft. The heat that emanated from the pallet resulted in smoke that caused a major distraction in the cockpit and later caused an explosion which seriously impaired the flight controls of the aircraft."
