= Ajaokuta Airstrip =

- IATA: none; ICAO: none; FAA LID: DN51

Summary
- Airport type: Public
- Serves: Ajaokuta, Nigeria
- Elevation AMSL: 620 ft (190 m)
- Coordinates: 7°27′30″N 6°27′40″E

Map
- Location of the airport in Nigeria

Runways
Direction	Length		Surface
Direction	m	ft	Surface
06/24	1,500	4,921	Asphalt
- Source: DAFIF GCM Google Maps

Ajaokuta Airstrip or Ajaokuta Airfield is an airstrip 22 kilometres (14 mi) southwest of Ajaokuta, a town in Kogi State, Nigeria.

== Description ==
The airport is located in Adogo, Ajaokuta town, one of the industrial areas in Kogi State. According to findings, the airport has a latitude of 7° 27' 15.59" N and a longitude of 6° 27' 23.99" E. The airport has no airline service. There are closer airports to the airstrip, such as Lokoja airstrip, which is 40 kilometres (25 mi) away, and Akure airport, which is 130 kilometres (81 mi) away.

== History ==
In 2021, the National Assembly, under the Senate President, approved a bill for the renovation of several airstrips in Nigeria. In the 2022 Nigeria national budget, Ajaokuta airstrip was among the eight airstrips listed for renovation and improvement. The aim is to generate more income and revenue from the Ajaokuta airstrip, as well as facilitate the movement and transportation of raw materials to and from the Ajaokuta Steel Mill in Kogi State.

== See also ==
- Transport in Nigeria
- List of airports in Nigeria
