= Olubunmi Kuku =

Nigerian aviation executive

Mrs. Olubunmi Oluwaseun Kuku

1st female holder [[Managing Director / Chief Executive Officer at Federal Airports Authority of Nigeria]]
- Incumbent
- Assumed office December 2023
- Appointed by: President Bola Tinubu
- President: Bola Tinubu
- Preceded by: Kabir Yusuf Mohammed

Personal details
- Citizenship: Nigerian
- Education: Bachelor of Science degree in Finance at the University of Illinois, MBA in international finance and strategic management at DePaul University's Kellstadt Graduate School of Business
- Occupation: Nigerian aviation executive
- Awards: Award of excellence from the Centre for International Advanced and Professional Studies (CIAPS)
- Website: https://faan.gov.ng/mrs-olubunmi-kuku/
- As of December 2023

Olubunmi Oluwaseun-Kuku, also known as Olubunmi Kuku is a Nigerian aviation executive who has been the Managing Director and Chief Executive Officer at the Federal Airports Authority of Nigeria (FAAN) since December 2023. She was appointed by President Bola Tinubu in the same year. She replaced Kabir Yusuf Mohammed, who was sacked the very day she received the appointment. She is the first woman to hold this position.

In September 2025, she was elected to become vice president of the Airports Council International Africa at the 34th ACI Africa General Assembly in Lusaka, Zambia, and that position elevated her from her previous position as the regional advisor for Africa to become a permanent member of the ACI World Governing Board. In 2025, she received an award of excellence from the Centre for International Advanced and Professional Studies (CIAPS).

== Early life and education ==
In 2000, Olubunmi obtained a Bachelor of Science degree in Finance at the University of Illinois. In 2004, she proceeded to obtain an MBA in international finance and strategic management at DePaul University's Kellstadt Graduate School of Business. In the same year, she obtained an executive education at Harvard Business School.

In 2024, she became a fellow of the Nigerian Institute of Business Development. In 2016, she became a member of the National Institute of Marketing Nigeria. In 2023, she participated in the executive leadership program, IGNITE, at INSEAD Business School.

== Academic career ==
Olubunmi's early career started at Ernst & Young (EY), where she worked as the manager for Finance & Performance Management. She also served as the manager of strategy and operations at Deloitte Consulting LLP. She proceeded to serve as vice president and head of visa consulting & analytics for Sub-Saharan Africa at Visa. She later moved to the Nigerian Airspace Management Agency and served as the general manager of business development at the agency.

In July 2011, she served as the Special Assistant to the Honourable Minister of Strategy and Infrastructure Development.

In December 2023, she was appointed as the Managing Director and Chief Executive Officer of the Federal Airports Authority of Nigeria (FAAN) by President Bola Tinubu.

Her tenure in office gave room for the expansion of Murtala Muhammed International Airport in Lagos. Under her leadership as the Managing Director and Chief Executive Officer of the Federal Airports Authority of Nigeria (FAAN), Nnamdi Azikiwe International Airport at Abuja and Port Harcourt International Airport were recognized by the Airports Council International Africa for their excellence in airport emergency management.

In September 2024, Kuku was nominated as Regional Advisor for Africa on the Airport Council International World Governing Board at the Airport Council International Africa General Assembly in South Africa. In September 2025, she won the election and became the Vice President of the Airport Council International Africa at the organization's General Assembly in Lusaka, Zambia,and she a permanent member of the Airport Council International World Governing Board.

== Awards ==
Award Name	Year
Award of excellence by the Centre for International Advanced and Professional Studies (CIAPS)	2025
