= Federal Airports Authority of Nigeria =

Nigerian port Authority

Federal Airport Authority of Nigeria
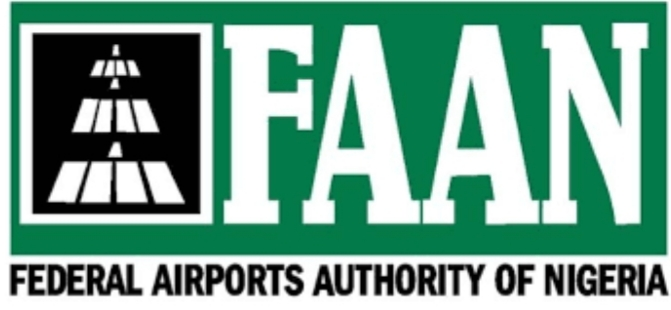
- Industry: Transport
- Founded: 1935
- Headquarters: Murtala Muhammed International Airport; Ikeja, Lagos State, Nigeria
- Key people: Festus Keyamo (Minister of Aviation and Aerospace Development); Olubunmi Kuku (MD/CEO)
- Products: Airport operations and services
- Website: faan.gov.ng

The Federal Airports Authority of Nigeria (FAAN) is a statutory service organisation responsible for the management of all commercial airports in Nigeria and for providing services to both passenger and cargo airlines. Its mandate is to create conditions for the development of air transport and related services in the most economic and efficient manner. The authority has its head office at Murtala Muhammed International Airport in Ikeja, Lagos State.

== History ==
Civil aviation in Nigeria is largely a legacy of British colonial rule and developed as a result of historical circumstances dating back to 1925, particularly in the ancient walled city of Kano.

The first aircraft to land in Nigerian territory were three Airco DH.9A aircraft of No. 47 Squadron, based at Helwan near Cairo. The aircraft landed at Maiduguri on 1 November 1925 en route to Kano and later Kaduna on 6 November 1925. The flight was led by then Squadron Leader Arthur Coningham.

Earlier in July of that year, Kano experienced a tense standoff between local residents and colonial government officials. At the time, the British government maintained an active Royal Air Force (RAF) base in Khartoum, Sudan. Following reports of unrest in Kano, authorities in London instructed the commanding officer of the Khartoum RAF Squadron to fly to Northern Nigeria and assess the situation. Flying a Bristol Fighter aircraft, the pilot made a safe landing on a horse racecourse in Kano, marking the first recorded aviation activity in Nigeria.

The flight was undertaken without established air routes, maps, or radio communications and was regarded as a particularly hazardous operation. Concerns were raised by officials, leading to suggestions that any future Khartoum–Kano air route would require emergency landing grounds at intervals of approximately 20 miles.

Subsequent flights originated from Cairo, where the RAF also maintained a base. These landings attracted significant local attention, inspiring a Kano resident to paint a watercolour of the event, which was later acquired by the government. RAF operations later became an annual occurrence, with routes and frequency extended to include Maiduguri.

The earliest known commercial aviation activity in Nigeria is credited to an individual known as "Bud" Carpenter, who owned a de Havilland Moth light aircraft. Records indicate that he frequently undertook high-risk flights between Kano and Lagos, navigating by following railway tracks, which increased travel distance.

In the early 1930s, a private pilot began carrying fare-paying passengers in a seaplane between Lagos and Warri. With the continuation of annual RAF flights, aviation activity in Nigeria expanded significantly, creating the need for designated aerodromes.

As a result, a representative of the British Air Ministry visited Nigeria to inspect existing landing grounds. Sites were subsequently selected at Maiduguri, Oshogbo, Lagos, Minna, Kano, and Kaduna. Wing Commander E. H. Coleman, an early observer of Nigerian civil aviation, described these aerodromes as rudimentary by modern standards. He noted that multiple runways were often constructed in different orientations to mitigate crosswind landings, as early tail-wheel aircraft were more susceptible to directional instability than modern nose-wheel aircraft.

In 1935, RAF operations were replaced by those of Imperial Airways, which introduced regular airmail and passenger services between London and Nigeria. Although these flights pioneered international commercial operations, sustained commercial aviation services commenced in 1936. Imperial Airways, the forerunner of the British Overseas Airways Corporation (BOAC), operated large four-engined aircraft on the Nile route from Cairo to Kisumu, Uganda. By late 1936, a weekly Khartoum–Kano–Lagos service was introduced using the de Havilland DH.86 aircraft. The journey took approximately seven days, and notable passengers included Sir Bernard Bourdillon, who travelled on the first commercial flight from Lagos.

Early aviation in Nigeria required pilots to operate under challenging conditions, including harmattan dust and heavy rainfall. In 1937, an emergency landing near Maiduguri required engineers to travel from Kano on horseback with tool kits to effect repairs. After repairs were completed, the aircraft was returned to service. Records indicate that flights from Kano to Lagos using early aircraft such as the DH.8 often took an entire day, including refuelling stops.

The West African Airways Corporation (WAAC) was established to develop air services within and between West African territories. The airline commenced operations with six-seat de Havilland Dove aircraft for Nigerian domestic routes, while West Coast services utilised Bristol Wayfarer aircraft. Civil aviation administration was overseen by the Directorates of Public Works in the respective territories, operating under United Kingdom Colonial Air Navigation Orders.

Following Ghana's withdrawal from WAAC in 1957, the Nigerian government, in partnership with BOAC and Elder Dempster Lines, established the West African Airways Corporation (Nigeria) Limited in August 1958. This entity later evolved into Nigeria Airways and marked a significant milestone in the development of Nigeria's airline industry.

On 22 May 2023, the Federal Government of Nigeria announced the appointment of a new Managing Director of the Federal Airports Authority of Nigeria (FAAN) for a four-year tenure.

=== Maintenance ===
The maintenance of air traffic service systems requires detailed planning of infrastructure and logistical support to ensure operational safety and efficiency. FAAN provides the following maintenance infrastructure and logistical support services:

- External and internal equipment monitoring devices
- Central maintenance workshops and laboratories
- Additional logistical support systems

==== External and internal equipment monitoring devices ====
Information on the status and failure of equipment and facilities is currently obtained through reports from service operators, users, and various monitoring devices. In line with efforts to improve service delivery, FAAN plans to introduce more advanced monitoring systems capable of immediate fault detection. These systems are designed to provide real-time visual displays of equipment configuration within equipment rooms.

=== Research ===
FAAN operates dedicated workshops and laboratories for component-level system maintenance. Activities include maintenance, repair, and modification of analogue equipment using conventional measuring instruments such as multimeters, signal generators, and oscilloscopes. All test instruments are routinely checked, with recalibration carried out every two years.

=== Logistics ===
The procurement, storage, and retrieval of spare parts are managed by FAAN's stores unit. Given the large volume of spare parts required for various systems, plans have been proposed to computerise inventory management to enhance efficiency. Other factors influencing FAAN's maintenance capacity include the reliability of public utilities such as the National Electric Power Authority (NEPA), Nigerian Telecommunications Limited (NITEL), and state water boards.

== Operations ==
=== Airports ===
The following airports and airstrip are owned and operated by the Federal Airports Authority of Nigeria (FAAN):

- Nnamdi Azikiwe International Airport
- Mallam Aminu Kano International Airport
- Murtala Muhammed International Airport
- Port Harcourt International Airport
- Kaduna Airport
- Maiduguri International Airport
- Yakubu Gowon Airport
- Yola Airport
- Sadiq Abubakar III International Airport
- Margaret Ekpo International Airport
- Akanu Ibiam International Airport
- Sam Mbakwe International Cargo Airport
- Ibadan Airport
- Ilorin Airport
- Bida Airstrip

=== Other operations ===
Murtala Muhammed Airport Schools (MMAS) operates its nursery and reception classes within FAAN staff residential quarters in Ikeja, Lagos, near Murtala Muhammed International Airport. The school's primary and secondary campuses are located adjacent to the FAAN staff quarters.
