= Federal Medical Centre, Gusau =

Federal Medical Centre in Nigeria

Geography
- Location: Sokoto Bye Pass Road, Gusau, Zamfara State, Nigeria

History
- Founded: 1998

Links
- Lists: Hospitals in Nigeria

Federal Medical Centre, Gusau is a federal government of Nigeria medical centre located in Gusau, Zamfara State, Nigeria. The current Medical Director is Dr. Bello A. Mohammed (MBBS, FWACS).

== CMD ==
The current Medical Director is Dr. Bello A. Mohammed (MBBS, FWACS).

== Services ==
Services provided at the Federal Medical Centre include: Intensive care units, Pharmacy services, Laboratory services, Radiology services, emergency services, and CT scan services.

== Collaboration ==
The ministry of health in Zamfara state collaborates with the Federal Medical Center Gusau to attempt to improve health care access in the state.

== Proposed upgrade ==
The Federal government has proposed to upgrade federal medical center gusau to a Teaching hospital for federal university of Gusau zamfara state.
