= Gusau Airstrip =

- IATA: ~~QUS~~; ICAO: DNGU

Summary
- Airport type: Public
- Location: Gusau, Nigeria
- Elevation AMSL: 1,520 ft (460 m)
- Coordinates: 12°10′20″N 6°41′45″E

Map
- Location of the airport in Nigeria

Runways
Direction	Length		Surface
Direction	m	ft	Surface
05/23	1,320	4,331	Laterite
- Source: WAD GCM Google Maps

Gusau Airstrip or Gusau Airfield (ICAO: DNGU) is an airstrip serving Gusau, the capital city of the Zamfara State in Nigeria and its nearby towns.

It is a new airport that was constructed by the former governor of Zamfara State, Bello Matawalle. It is the only functional airport in the state, and handles commercial and private flights to most cities in Nigeria.

== Gusau Airstrip construction ==
The Gusau airport was a planned construction project for an international cargo airport at Gusau. The project commenced construction in August 2019 in the leadership of Gov. Bello Matawalle. However, the project was delayed for about a year beyond the scheduled completion date. The governor stated that operations would commence by the end of May 2021, he also confirmed that the airport project was to be executed under a USD1 billion, public private partnership (ppp) with Afrexim Bank.

== Gusau Airstrip runway ==
Gusau airfield has only one runway whose surface is unpaved, it is also coated with laterite. Runway lighting is yet to be installed at the airport, because of the lack of light, flights only take place during the day.

== See also ==
- Transport in Nigeria
- List of airports in Nigeria
