= Zaria Airport =

- IATA: ZAR; ICAO: DNZA

Summary
- Airport type: Public
- Owner/Operator: Federal Airports Authority of Nigeria (FAAN)
- Serves: Zaria, Nigeria
- Elevation AMSL: 2,177 ft (664 m)
- Coordinates: 11°07′50″N 7°41′10″E

Map
- Location of the airport in Nigeria

Runways
Direction	Length		Surface
Direction	m	ft	Surface
05/23	1,670	5,479	Asphalt
- Sources: WAD GCM Google Maps

Zaria Airport (IATA: ZAR, ICAO: DNZA) is an airport serving Zaria, a city in the Kaduna State of Nigeria. The airport is 7 kilometres (4.3 mi) north of the city. Nigerian College of Aviation Technology NCAT is based on the grounds of the airport.

There are no scheduled airline operations at the airport. The airport is for training students to become pilots. It is an institution of aviation technology which is controlled by the federal government to control the affairs of the College of Technology.

The Zaria non-directional beacon (Ident: ZA) is on the field.

== History ==
The Nigerian College of Aviation Technology Zaria was set up in 1964 responsible for training pilots, air traffic controllers, aircraft maintenance engineers, aeronautical telecommunication engineers, cabin crew, flight dispatchers, and other aviation professionals.

== See also ==
- Transport in Nigeria
- List of airports in Nigeria
