= Nigerian Aviation Handling Company =

Aero support service company in Nigeria

Nigerian Aviation Handling Company (NAHCO) is a Nigerian air transportation support service company that offers ground handling service, cargo handling, power distribution, and fueling for Nigeria's air transport industry.

== History ==
NAHCO was established in 1979. It was privatized in 2005 and listed on the Nigerian Stock Exchange in 2006.

== Controversies ==
- On 4 January 2023, NAHCO staff crashed into an aircraft belonging to Air Peace at the Murtala Muhammed Airport, Lagos. It was reported that the incident was the third time in a month NAHCO equipment had damaged Air Peace aircraft. The officers responsible for the damages were suspended 3 weeks later.
- On 23 January 2023, NAHCO staff staged a 14 hour strike over poor salaries at the Murtala Muhammed Airport, Lagos causing a halt in the operations and flight cancellations of domestic and international airlines they serviced.
