= Makurdi Airport =

- IATA: MDI; ICAO: DNMK

Summary
- Airport type: Public / Military
- Owner/Operator: Nigerian Air Force / Federal Airports Authority of Nigeria
- Serves: Makurdi, Nigeria
- Elevation AMSL: 371 ft (113 m)
- Coordinates: 7°42′10″N 8°36′45″E

Map
- Location of the airport in Nigeria

Runways
Direction	Length		Surface
Direction	m	ft	Surface
05/23	3,000	9,843	Concrete
- Sources: WAD GCM Google Maps

Makurdi Airport (IATA: MDI, ICAO: DNMK) is an airport serving Makurdi, the capital city of Benue State in Nigeria. It is a domestic Airport.

The runway has an additional 266 metres (873 ft) paved overrun on each end. The Makurdi non-directional beacon (Ident: MK) is 1.2 nautical miles (1.4 mi; 2.2 km) northwest of the runway.

== See also ==
- Transport in Nigeria
- List of airports in Nigeria
