= Bida Airport =

Airport in Nigeria

- IATA: none; ICAO: DNBI

Summary
- Airport type: Public
- Serves: Bida
- Elevation AMSL: 450 ft (140 m)
- Coordinates: 9°06′10″N 6°00′50″E

Map
- Location of the airport in Nigeria

Runways
Direction	Length		Surface
Direction	m	ft	Surface
04/22	1,178	3,865	Asphalt
- Source: Google Maps GCM

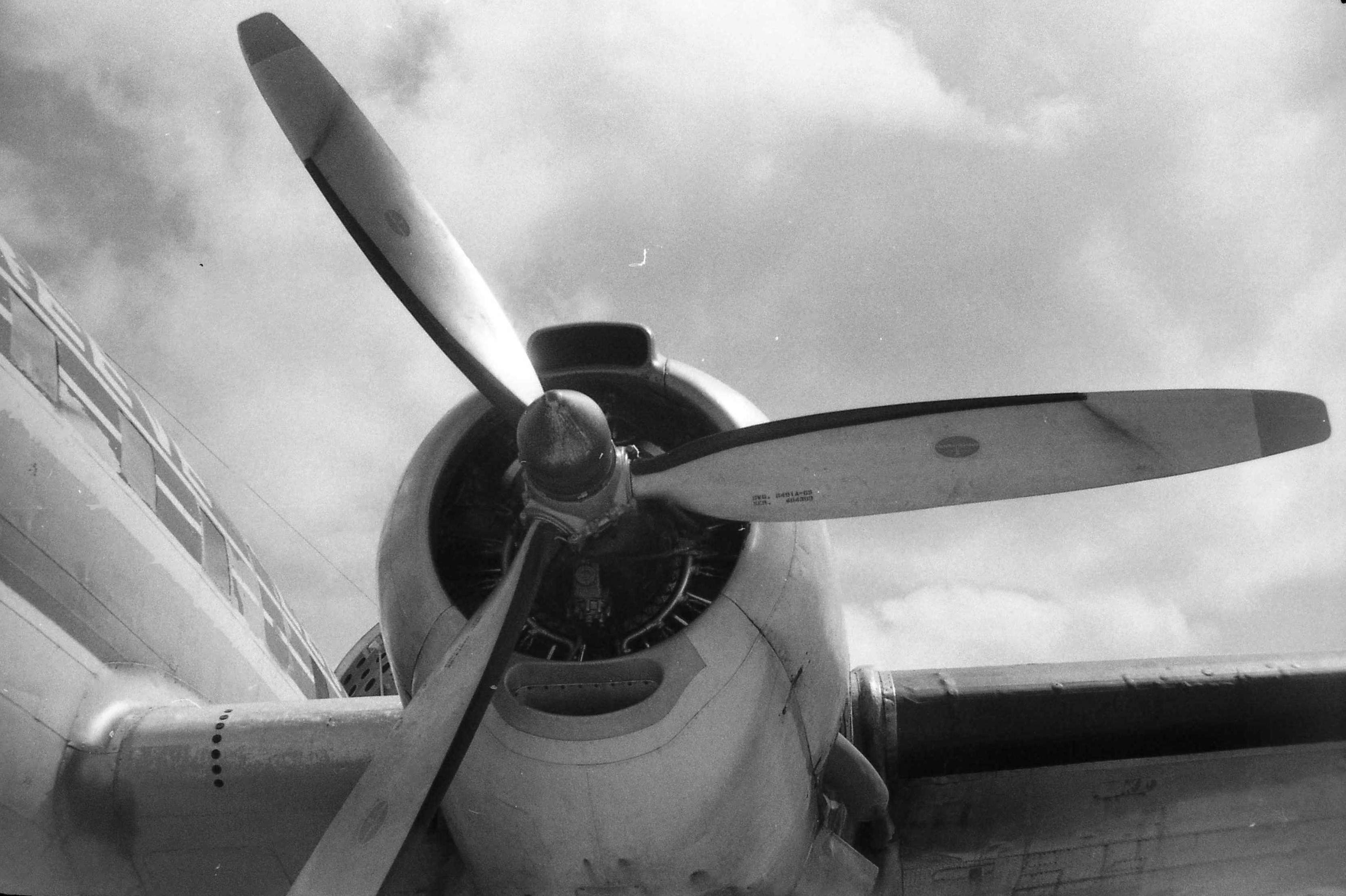
A Reeve Aleutian Airways Curtiss C-46 Commando cargo plane at Dutch Harbor, Alaska, in 1972 (unrelated to Bida Airport)

Bida Airport (ICAO: DNBI) is an airport serving Bida in Nigeria.

The Bida VOR/DME (ident: BDA) and Bida Non-directional beacon (ident: BD) are located on the airfield.

== Details description ==
The airstrip is located in Bida in Niger state Nigeria, one of the largest cities and populated places in Niger state.

According to findings, it was concluded that the airport distance from Abuja to Bida airstrip is calculated to be 163 km distance. The airstrip has a latitude of 9°05'60.0"N (9.1000000°), and longitude of 6°01'00.0"E (6.0166700°).

And according to findings, the airport has only one runway 04/22. It has some nearby airports around in the same state and region, Minna airport (DMN) which is 78 km away, Shiroro airport 124 km away.

== See also ==
- Transport in Nigeria
- List of airports in Nigeria
