= Yola Airport =

Yola International Airport
- IATA: YOL; ICAO: DNYO

Summary
- Airport type: Public
- Owner/Operator: Federal Airports Authority of Nigeria (FAAN)
- Serves: Yola, Nigeria
- Location: Jimeta
- Time zone: WAT (UTC+01:00)
- Elevation AMSL: 612 ft (187 m)
- Coordinates: 09°15′27″N 12°25′49″E

Map
- Location of airport in Nigeria

Runways
Direction	Length		Surface
Direction	m	ft	Surface
17/35	3,000	9,843	Asphalt

Statistics (2015)
- Passengers: 158,896
- Passenger change 14–15: ▲1.5%
- Sources: WAD GCM

Yola Airport (now Lamido Aliyu Mustapha Airport) (IATA: YOL, ICAO: DNYO) is an airport located in Yola, the capital of the Adamawa State of Nigeria.

The airport has night landing capabilities, but for most flights in non-international designated airports, the Federal Airports Authority of Nigeria restricts night operations except for passenger flights during the Hajj pilgrimage.

On 2 August 2019, a staff member on the airport was suspended by the Federal Airports Authority of Nigeria for stealing someone's money with a bribe.

On 22 July 2024, the runway was closed due to a Boeing 737 busting its tyres on the runway.

== Airlines and destinations ==
Airlines	Destinations
Aero Contractors	Abuja, Lagos
Air Peace	Abuja, Lagos
Umza Xpress	Abuja
Max Air	Abuja, Kano, Lagos; Charter Jeddah
ValueJet	Abuja

In addition, Dornier Aviation Nigeria operates charter flights from the airport to various destinations in support of United Nations humanitarian initiatives.

== Statistics ==
These data show the number of passengers movements into the airport, according to the Federal Airports Authority of Nigeria's Aviation Sector Summary Reports.

Year	2005	2006	2007	2008	2009	2010	2011	2012	2013	2014	2015
Passengers	70,466	64,324	46,489	26,379	108,677	118,623	92,640	110,493	135,214	156,611	158,896
Growth (%)	▲27.59%	▼8.72%	▼27.73%	▼43.26%	▲311.98%	▲9.15%	▼21.90%	▲19.27%	▲22.37%	▲15.82%	▲1.46%
Source: Federal Airports Authority of Nigeria (FAAN). Aviation Sector Reports (2010-2013, 2014, Q3-Q4 of 2015, and Q1-Q2 of 2016,)

== See also ==
- Transport in Nigeria
- List of airports in Nigeria
- List of the busiest airports in Africa
