= Akanu Ibiam International Airport =

International airport serving Enugu, Nigeria

Akanu Ibiam International Airport Enugu Airport
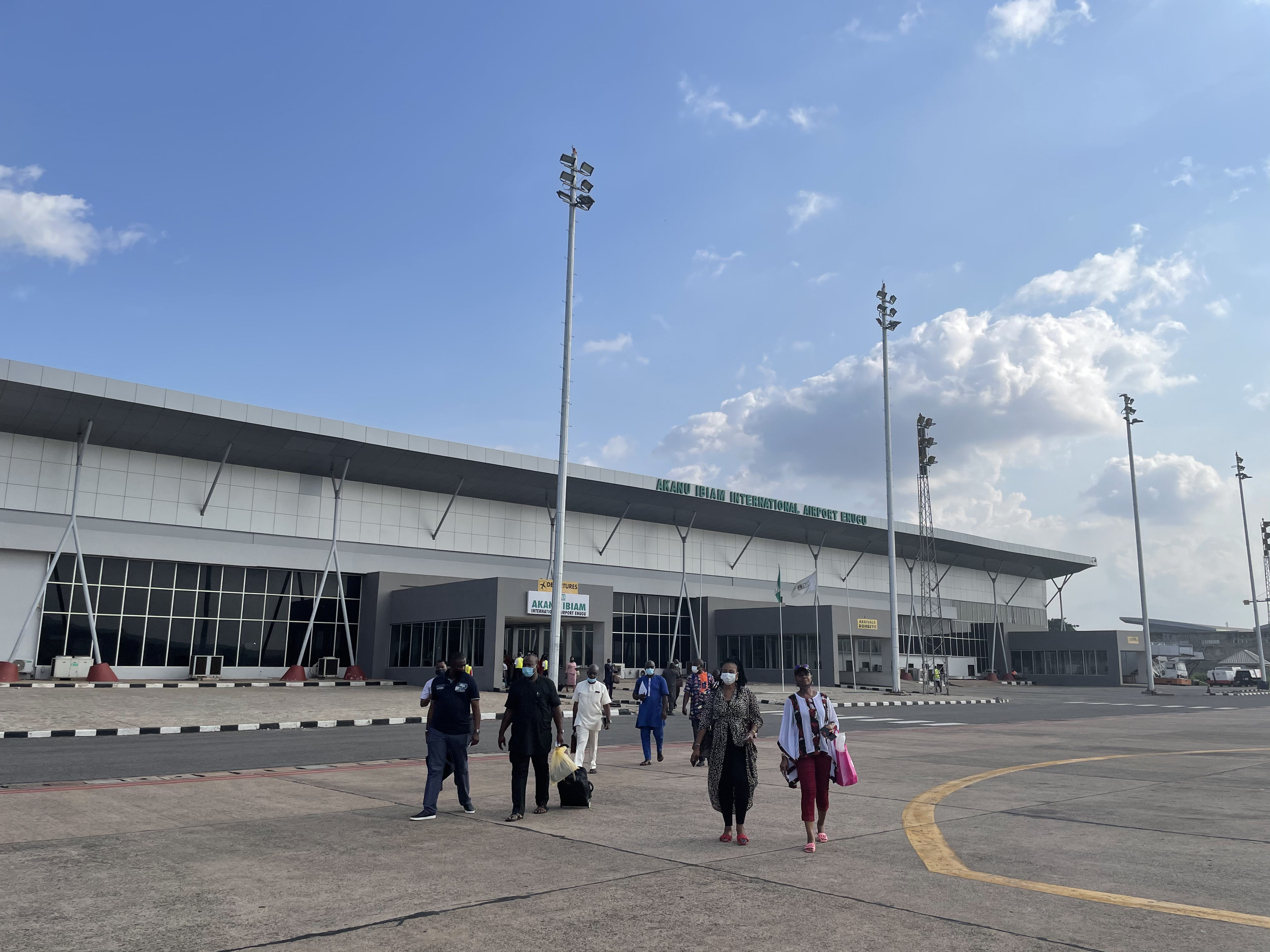
- IATA: ENU; ICAO: DNEN

Summary
- Airport type: Public
- Owner/Operator: Federal Airports Authority of Nigeria (FAAN)
- Serves: Enugu, Awgu, Abakaliki, Awka, Umuahia; (Onitsha),( Nnewi),(Owerri), Aba, Okigwe, Nsukka, Orlu, Afikpo and Arochukwu, Parts of Cross River, Benue and Kogi States of Nigeria. Nigeria
- Time zone: WAT (UTC+01:00)
- Elevation AMSL: 466 ft (142 m)
- Coordinates: 6°28′26″N 7°33′40″E

Map
- Location of airport in Nigeria

Runways
Direction	Length		Surface
Direction	m	ft	Surface
08/26	3,000	9,843	Asphalt

Statistics (2015)
- Passengers: 352,820
- Passenger change 14–15: ▲4.5%
- Sources: FAAN WAD GCM

Akanu Ibiam International Airport (IATA: ENU, ICAO: DNEN), also known as Enugu Airport, is an international airport serving Enugu, the capital city of Enugu State in Nigeria, and nearby cities, such as Abakaliki, Awka, Onitsha, Nnewi, Afikpo, Okigwe, Nsukka, Ugep, Orlu, Idah, Otukpo and Ogoja. It is named after the 20th-century politician Akanu Ibiam. The airport is strategically located at Emene, which is the primary industrial hub in Enugu.

It plays host to the Nigerian Air Force Base made up of the Ground Training Command, 405 Helicopter Combat Training Group, 541 Comms Group, 553 Base Services Group, and the International Helicopter Flying School. The airport is an international airport.

== History ==
It is named after the late Akanu Ibiam (1906–1995), a medical doctor and statesman who hailed from Afikpo in Ebonyi State.

The airport was closed on 10 February 2010, by the Federal Airports Authority of Nigeria (FAAN) for the first phase of major renovation and expansion works. It was re-opened on 16 December 2010, but the second and third phase of the construction work were completed after that.

== Airlines and destinations ==
Airlines	Destinations
Ethiopian Airlines	Addis Ababa

== Statistics ==
These data show the number of passengers movements into the airport, according to the Federal Airports Authority of Nigeria's Aviation Sector Summary Reports.

Year	2005	2006	2007	2008	2009	2010	2011	2012	2013	2014	2015
Passengers	197,783	173,559	201,064	276,035	366,592	N.D.	301,744	211,225	229,676	337,530	352,820
Growth (%)	▼3.88%	▼12.25%	▲15.85%	▲37.29%	▲32.81%	N.D.	N.D.	▼30.00%	▲8.74%	▲46.96%	▲4.53%
Source: Federal Airports Authority of Nigeria (FAAN). Aviation Sector Reports (2010-2013, 2014, Q3-Q4 of 2015, and Q1-Q2 of 2016)

== See also ==
- Transport in Nigeria
- List of airports in Nigeria
- List of the busiest airports in Africa
