= Ibadan Airport =

- IATA: IBA; ICAO: DNIB

Summary
- Airport type: Public
- Owner/Operator: Federal Airports Authority of Nigeria (FAAN)
- Serves: Ibadan, Oyo, Nigeria
- Time zone: WAT (UTC+01:00)
- Elevation AMSL: 728 ft (222 m)
- Coordinates: 7°21′35″N 3°58′33″E

Map
- Location of the airport in Nigeria

Runways
Direction	Length		Surface
Direction	m	ft	Surface
04/22	3,000	9,843	Asphalt
- Sources: WAD GCM

Ibadan Airport (now Samuel Ladoke Akintola Airport) (IATA: IBA, ICAO: DNIB) is an airport serving Ibadan, the capital of the Oyo State of Nigeria. It was commissioned by Joseph Wayas, a former senate president of Nigeria, in June 1982.

== Airlines and destinations ==
Airlines	Destinations
Air Peace	Abuja

== See also ==
- Transport in Nigeria
- List of airports in Nigeria
