= Gusau =

Capital city of Zamfara State, Nigeria

- City and LGA
- Motto: Gusau Ta Sambo Dandin Hausa
- Interactive map of Gusau
- Location in Nigeria
- Coordinates: 12°09′N 6°40′E
- Country: Nigeria
- State: Zamfara State

Area
  - Total: 3,364 km^{2} (1,299 sq mi)

Population (2006) (LGA)
  - Total: 383,162
  - Estimate (2022): 682,700
  - Density: 113.9/km^{2} (295.0/sq mi)
- Time zone: UTC+1 (WAT)
- 3-digit postal code prefix: 880
- ISO 3166 code: NG.ZA.GS
- Climate: Aw

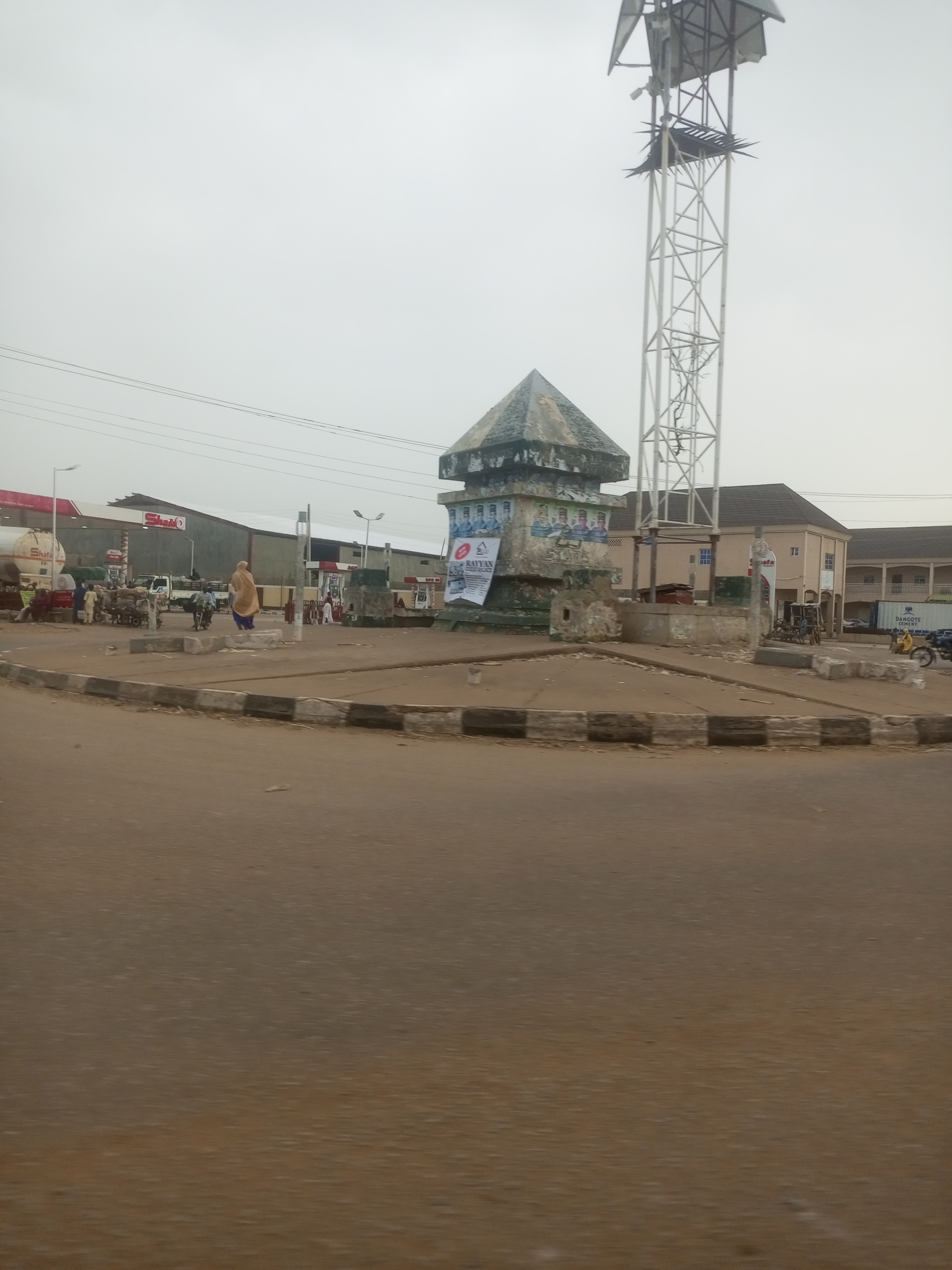
Roundabout in Gusau town

Gusau is a city in northwestern Nigeria. It is the capital of Zamfara State and also the name of the state's Local Government Area of Gusau, which has an area of 3,364 km (2,090 mi)² and a population of 383,162 as of the 2006 census.

The area's postal code is 880.

The current local government chairman is Yahaya Garba.

== Geography ==
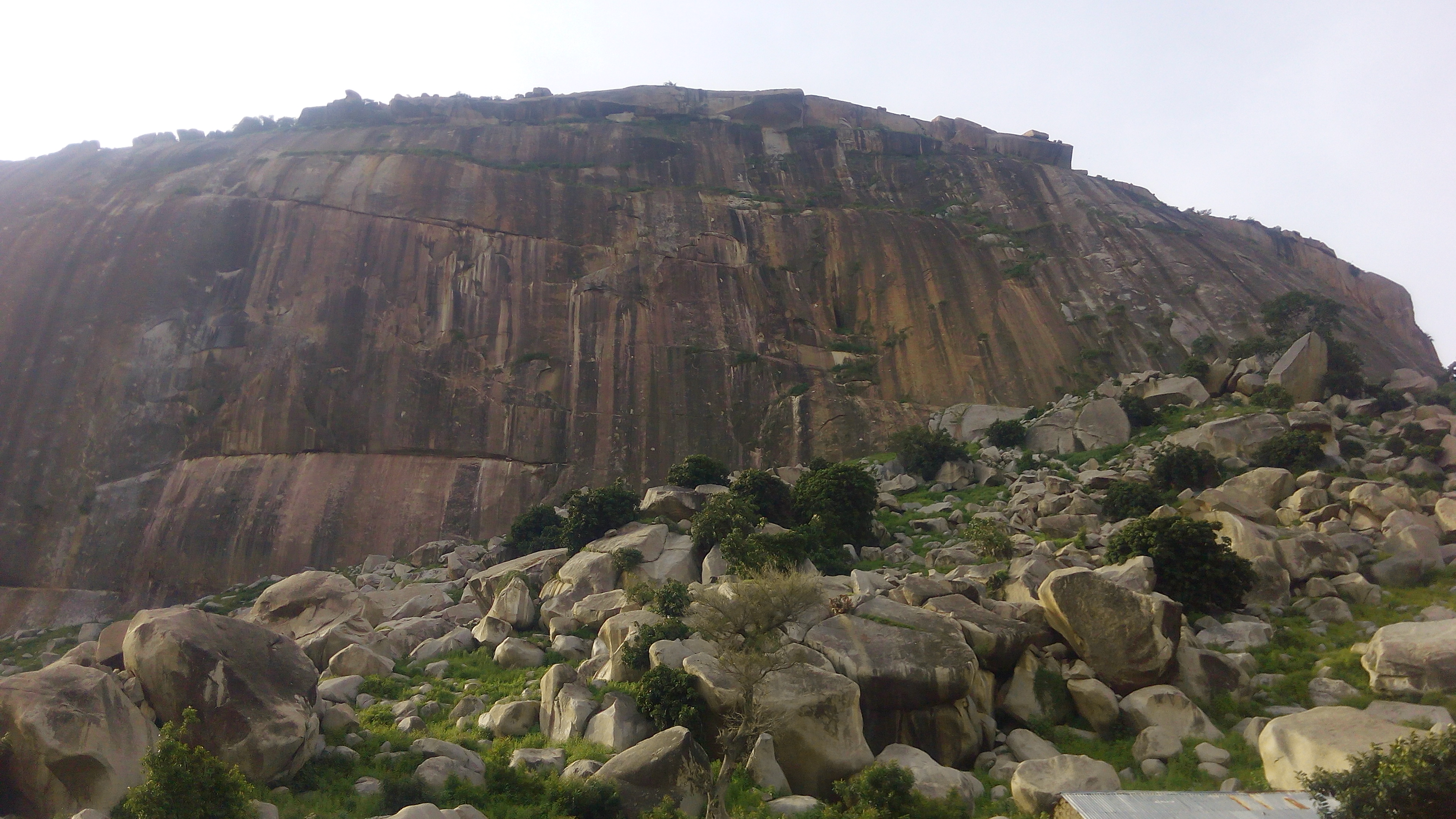
Mount Kwatarkwashi, near Gusau

Gusau City is located north of a line drawn from Kebbi to Kano in Nigeria. The Hausa people are the indigenous inhabitants of Gusau.

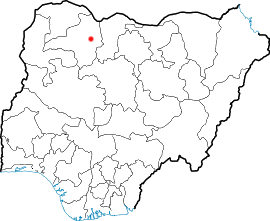
location of Gusau

Gusau district was one of the Districts that emerged following the jihad movement of the nineteenth century in Hausa land, led by the legendary Sheikh Usman dan Fodio. It was founded around 1799 by Mallam Muhammadu Sambo Dan Ashafa, a disciple of dan Fodio. Gusau district only became prominent after the fall of Yandoto in 1806. Since its emergence as an important settlement in the Sokoto Caliphate, Gusau town has attracted attention as an important agricultural and commercial center. At any rate, the town and its surrounding areas had attracted large presence of agriculturists; farmers and livestock rearers, especially cattle owning Fulani.

Gusau before the colonial period, was an agrarian society; agriculture was the backbone of the economy of the Gusau people. The economic activity of the people during this period consisted mainly in farming with other minor supplementary occupations, although, like most other Hausa towns, agriculture remained the main activity. In the area there were builders, thatchers, butchers, blacksmiths, drummers, praise-singers, etc.

Gusau and the territory assigned to Mallam Sambo Dan Ashafa falls within the metropolitan section of the caliphate. After the consolidation of Mallam Sambo, with their headquarters at Gusau, it had under it the territories of Wonaka, Mada, Yandoto, Samri, Magami, Marabu, Mareri, Mutumji, Kwaren Ganuwa, Wanke and a group of villages around Gusau, like other parts of the caliphate.

In territorial administration besides the fief holders in the outlying territory, the town was broken into five wards namely, Shiyar Magaji, Uban Dawaki, Galadima, Mayana and Sarkin Fada. They were the vital links between the people in their respective wards and the Sarkin katsinan Gusau (Emir Of Gusau). They are the eyes and ears of Sarki. Gusau like other parts of the Caliphate send a share of its revenue to the Sultan Of Sokoto.

The coming of colonialism brought about certain developments and transformations of the societies in Gusau. Colonial infrastructures such as tarred roads, railways, modern stores, businesses as well as modern manufactures were all brought to the town. Similarly, modern residences, offices, schools and hospital were added to the town which aided and further enhanced, its expansion and modernization process.

However, there are colonial policies that were introduced by the colonial administration which changed the system of political administration. The Gusau area is something of an anachronism. It was not a division but is treated as such in all respects politically, in which respect it has the status of a touring area. During the colonial administration 1907, they introduced cattle tax (Jangali).

During the colonial period agriculture remained the main economic activity of Gusau, with economic potentials and also is a predominantly agricultural society. Agriculture was the mainstay of the economy and was mainly undertaken in Damina with the cultivation of major crops.

Gusau covers a total land area of approximately 3469 square kilometers. The area within which Gusau is located is interrupted by few little rocky outcrops, such as hills of Mareri and Dokau. Gusau enjoys a tropical type of climate largely controlled by two masses, namely the tropical and maritime.

== Emirate ==
The Emir of Gusau is Alh Dr. Abdulkadir Ibrahim Bello Sarkin Katsinan Gusau who was crowned after the death of his Father Alh Dr. Ibrahim Muhammad Bello by the Executive Governor Governor Dr. Dauda Lawal on 29th July 2025.

== Climate ==
In Gusau, the dry season is partially cloudy and hot all year round, while the wet season is oppressive and generally cloudy.

The greatest time of year to visit Gusau for hot-weather activities, according to the beach/pool score, is from late October to mid-March.

Gusau has a tropical savanna climate (Köppen climate classification Aw).

Climate change is causing a warmer climate in Gusau, with warmer temperatures and colder conditions.

Climate data for Gusau (1991-2020)
| Month | Jan | Feb | Mar | Apr | May | Jun | Jul | Aug | Sep | Oct | Nov | Dec | Year |
|---|---|---|---|---|---|---|---|---|---|---|---|---|---|
| Record high °C (°F) | 40.0 (104.0) | 42.0 (107.6) | 46.3 (115.3) | 47.3 (117.1) | 43.0 (109.4) | 40.0 (104.0) | 37.0 (98.6) | 34.6 (94.3) | 37.8 (100.0) | 39.0 (102.2) | 40.3 (104.5) | 38.7 (101.7) | 47.3 (117.1) |
| Mean daily maximum °C (°F) | 31.7 (89.1) | 34.7 (94.5) | 38.2 (100.8) | 39.0 (102.2) | 36.9 (98.4) | 33.6 (92.5) | 30.9 (87.6) | 29.6 (85.3) | 31.5 (88.7) | 33.9 (93.0) | 34.7 (94.5) | 32.2 (90.0) | 33.9 (93.0) |
| Daily mean °C (°F) | 23.6 (74.5) | 26.5 (79.7) | 30.1 (86.2) | 31.9 (89.4) | 30.9 (87.6) | 28.3 (82.9) | 26.4 (79.5) | 25.5 (77.9) | 26.5 (79.7) | 27.2 (81.0) | 25.5 (77.9) | 23.7 (74.7) | 27.2 (81.0) |
| Record low °C (°F) | 4.5 (40.1) | 5.3 (41.5) | 8.8 (47.8) | 17.0 (62.6) | 17.5 (63.5) | 16.5 (61.7) | 17.0 (62.6) | 17.5 (63.5) | 17.5 (63.5) | 13.0 (55.4) | 10.0 (50.0) | 7.7 (45.9) | 6.5 (43.7) |
| Average precipitation mm (inches) | 0.1 (0.00) | 0.0 (0.0) | 0.7 (0.03) | 15.7 (0.62) | 84.1 (3.31) | 134.1 (5.28) | 195.7 (7.70) | 312.6 (12.31) | 186.7 (7.35) | 40.6 (1.60) | 0.3 (0.01) | 0.0 (0.0) | 970.6 (38.21) |
| Average precipitation days (≥ 1.0 mm) | 0.0 | 0.0 | 0.1 | 1.4 | 5.8 | 8.7 | 11.4 | 14.5 | 11.1 | 3.1 | 0.0 | 0.0 | 56.1 |
| Average relative humidity (%) | 25.1 | 19.9 | 20.6 | 37.1 | 56.9 | 67.6 | 75.5 | 81.4 | 79.5 | 63.4 | 38.9 | 30.8 | 49.7 |
Source 1: NOAA
Source 2: Deutscher Wetterdienst (extremes)

== See also ==
- Gusau Dam
- Gusau Airstrip
- Railway stations in Nigeria
- Federal Medical Centre, Gusau
