= Yakubu Gowon Airport =

Yakubu Gowon Airport Jos Airport
- IATA: JOS; ICAO: DNJO

Summary
- Airport type: Public
- Owner/Operator: Federal Airports Authority of Nigeria (FAAN)
- Serves: Jos, Nigeria
- Time zone: WAT (UTC+01:00)
- Elevation AMSL: 1,289 m / 4,229 ft
- Coordinates: 9°38′20″N 8°52′15″E

Map
- Location of the airport in Nigeria

Runways
Direction	Length		Surface
Direction	m	ft	Surface
10/28	3,000	9,843	Asphalt
- Sources: WAD GCM

Yakubu Gowon Airport (IATA: JOS, ICAO: DNJO), also known as Jos Airport, is an airport serving Jos, the capital of the Plateau State of Nigeria. It was named after Yakubu Gowon, the Nigerian head of state from 1966 to 1975.

== Airlines and destinations ==
Airlines	Destinations
Arik Air	Lagos
Max Air	Abuja
ValueJet	Lagos

== See also ==
- Federal Airports Authority of Nigeria
- Transport in Nigeria
- List of airports in Nigeria
