= Sadiq Abubakar III International Airport =

Airport serving Sokoto, Nigeria

- IATA: SKO; ICAO: DNSO

Summary
- Airport type: Public
- Owner/Operator: Federal Airports Authority of Nigeria (FAAN)
- Serves: Sokoto, Nigeria
- Time zone: WAT (UTC+01:00)
- Elevation AMSL: 1,010 ft (310 m)
- Coordinates: 12°54′58″N 5°12′25″E

Map
- Location of the airport in Nigeria

Runways
Direction	Length		Surface
Direction	m	ft	Surface
08/26	3,000	9,843	Asphalt
- Sources: FAAN WAS GCM

Sadiq Abubakar III International Airport or Sultan Saddik Abubakar Airport (IATA: SKO, ICAO: DNSO) is an airport serving Sokoto, the capital of the Sokoto State in Nigeria. It is named after Siddiq Abubakar III, the Sultan of Sokoto from 1938 to 1988. Its operator is Federal Airports Authority of Nigeria (FAAN).

In 2022, it was the airport with the third highest level of aviation traffic in Northern Nigeria.

== History ==
Located near Bodinga to the south of Sokoto, Sadiq Abubakar III International Airport was officially opened on 17 February 1982; it replaced an existing airport in the southern suburbs of Sokoto.

Stevin Construction got the contract to build pavements and earthworks for the airport. The airport was planned to get air service from Boeing 747 aircraft. The Stevin Group contract for this airport was for 20 million British pounds.

In August 2018 supporters of the former Governor of Sokoto State Aliyu Magatakarda Wamakko trespassed onto the secure area, including some on motorcycles, and gathered on the airport’s apron; they prevented the aircraft that Wamakko was using from parking on the apron after it landed. The incident raised concerns in an editorial from This Day about the security and safety of Nigerian airports. FAAN criticised people organizing events that obstructed the airport.

In 2026 the Sokoto state government criticised the lighting system at the airport.

== Facilities ==
The airport has a single asphalt/concrete runway, 08/26; it is 3,000 metres (9,843 ft) long and 60 metres (197 ft) wide. The airport has a VOR/DME and an instrument landing system for navigation.

In 2022 there was a terminal for Hajj flights that was still under construction.

In 2025 plans for a VIP terminal and a new airport access road were announced.

== See also ==
- Transport in Nigeria
- List of airports in Nigeria
- Federal Airports Authority of Nigeria
