= List of airports by ICAO code: D =

List of airports by ICAO code: A - B - C - D - E - F - G - H - ~~I~~ - J - K - L - M - N - O - P - Q - R - S - T - U - V - W - ~~X~~ - Y - Z

== DA - Algeria ==
Also see airport category and list.

| ICAO | IATA | Airport name | Community | Coordinates |
|---|---|---|---|---|
| DAAB | | Blida Airport | Blida | 36°30′14″N 002°48′52″E |
| DAAD | BUJ | Bou Saada Airport | Bou Saada | 35°20′00″N 004°12′20″E |
| DAAE | BJA | Soummam Airport | Bejaia | 36°42′43″N 005°04′10″E |
| DAAG | ALG | Houari Boumedienne Airport | Algiers | 36°41′40″N 003°13′01″E |
| DAAJ | DJG | Tiska Airport | Djanet | 24°17′35″N 009°27′07″E |
| DAAK | QFD | Boufarik Airport | Boufarik | 36°32′45″N 002°52′34″E |
| DAAM | | Telergma Airport | Telerghma | 36°06′31″N 006°21′51″E |
| DAAN | | Reggane Airport | Reggane | 26°42′36″N 000°17′08″E |
| DAAP | VVZ | Takhamalt Airport | Illizi | 26°43′25″N 008°37′04″E |
| DAAQ | | Aïn Oussera Airport | Aïn Oussera | 35°31′32″N 002°52′43″E |
| DAAS | QSF | Ain Arnat Airport | Setif | 36°10′41″N 005°19′28″E |
| DAAT | TMR | Aguenar – Hadj Bey Akhamok Airport | Tamanrasset | 22°48′40″N 005°27′03″E |
| DAAV | GJL | Jijel Ferhat Abbas Airport | Jijel | 36°47′40″N 005°52′25″E |
| DAAW | | Bordj Omar Driss Airport | Bordj Omar Driss | 28°07′55″N 006°49′59″E |
| DAAY | MZW | Mécheria Airport | Mécheria | 33°32′08″N 000°14′32″W |
| DAAZ | QZN | Relizane Airport | Relizane | 35°45′08″N 000°37′35″E |
| DABB | AAE | Rabah Bitat Airport | Annaba | 36°49′20″N 007°48′34″E |
| DABC | CZL | Mohamed Boudiaf International Airport | Constantine | 36°17′07″N 006°37′09″E |
| DABO | | Oum el Bouaghi Airport | Oum El Bouaghi | 35°52′39″N 007°15′26″E |
| DABS | TEE | Tébessa Airport | Tébessa | 35°25′57″N 008°07′32″E |
| DABT | BLJ | Batna Airport | Batna | 35°45′33″N 006°19′12″E |
| DAFH | HRM | Hassi R'Mel Airport | Hassi R'Mel | 32°55′49″N 003°18′41″E |
| DAFI | QDJ | Tsletsi Airport | Djelfa | 34°39′56″N 003°21′03″E |
| DAOB | TID | Bou Chekif Airport | Tiaret | 35°20′29″N 001°28′01″E |
| DAOC | | Béchar Ouakda Airport | Béchar | 31°38′35″N 002°11′04″W |
| DAOE | | Bousfer Air Base | Bousfer | 35°44′07″N 000°48′19″W |
| DAOF | TIN | Tindouf Airport | Tindouf | 27°42′01″N 008°10′02″W |
| DAOI | CFK | Chlef International Airport | Chlef | 36°12′45″N 001°19′54″E |
| DAOL | TAF | Oran Tafaraoui Airport | Oran | 35°32′33″N 000°31′56″W |
| DAON | TLM | Zenata – Messali El Hadj Airport | Tlemcen | 35°00′55″N 001°27′03″W |
| DAOO | ORN | Ahmed Ben Bella Airport | Oran | 35°37′38″N 000°36′41″W |
| DAOR | CBH | Boudghene Ben Ali Lotfi Airport | Béchar | 31°39′17″N 002°15′40″W |
| DAOS | BFW | Sidi Bel Abbès Airport | Sidi Bel Abbès | 35°10′19″N 000°35′35″W |
| DAOV | MUW | Ghriss Airport | Ghriss | 35°13′01″N 000°08′54″E |
| DAOY | EBH | El Bayadh Airport | El Bayadh | 33°43′15″N 001°05′29″E |
| DATG | INF | In Guezzam Airport | In Guezzam | 19°34′08″N 005°44′56″E |
| DATM | BMW | Bordj Mokhtar Airport | Bordj Mokhtar | 21°22′30″N 000°55′26″E |
| DAUA | AZR | Touat-Cheikh Sidi Mohamed Belkebir Airport | Adrar | 27°50′21″N 000°11′07″W |
| DAUB | BSK | Biskra Airport | Biskra | 34°47′35″N 005°44′17″E |
| DAUE | ELG | El Golea Airport | El Golea | 30°34′08″N 002°51′53″E |
| DAUG | GHA | Noumérat – Moufdi Zakaria Airport | Ghardaia | 32°22′54″N 003°47′58″E |
| DAUH | HME | Oued Irara–Krim Belkacem Airport | Hassi Messaoud | 31°40′26″N 006°08′26″E |
| DAUI | INZ | In Salah Airport | In Salah | 27°15′13″N 002°30′39″E |
| DAUK | TGR | Touggourt Sidi Madhi Airport | Touggourt | 33°04′03″N 006°05′27″E |
| DAUL | LOO | L'Mekrareg Airport | Laghouat | 33°45′50″N 002°55′38″E |
| DAUO | ELU | Guemar Airport | El Oued | 33°30′47″N 006°46′57″E |
| DAUT | TMX | Timimoun Airport | Timimoun | 29°14′28″N 000°17′01″E |
| DAUU | OGX | Ain el Beida Airport | Ouargla | 31°55′02″N 005°24′46″E |
| DAUZ | IAM | In Amenas Airport | In Amenas | 28°03′05″N 009°38′34″E |

== DB - Benin ==
Also see airport category and list.

| ICAO | IATA | Airport name | Community | Coordinates |
|---|---|---|---|---|
| DBBB | COO | Cadjehoun Airport (Cotonou Airport) | Cotonou | 06°21′26″N 002°23′04″E |
| DBBC | | Cana Airport | Bohicon | 07°07′32″N 002°02′49″E |
| DBBD | DJA | Djougou Airport | Djougou | 09°41′31″N 001°38′15″E |
| DBBK | KDC | Kandi Airport | Kandi | 11°08′41″N 002°56′23″E |
| DBBN | NAE | Natitingou Airport | Natitingou | 10°22′37″N 001°21′37″E |
| DBBO | | Porga Airport | Porga | 11°02′47″N 000°59′35″E |
| DBBP | PKO | Parakou Airport | Parakou | 09°21′25″N 002°36′33″E |
| DBBR | | Bembereke Airport | Bembereke | 10°16′25″N 002°41′46″E |
| DBBS | SVF | Savé Airport | Savé | 08°01′05″N 002°27′52″E |

== DF - Burkina Faso ==
Also see airport category and list.

| ICAO | IATA | Airport name | Community | Coordinates |
|---|---|---|---|---|
| DFCA | XKY | Kaya Airport | Kaya | 13°04′39″N 001°06′01″W |
| DFCB | | Barsalogho Airport | Barsalogho | 13°24′00″N 001°03′48″W |
| DFCC | OUG | Ouahigouya Airport | Ouahigouya | 13°33′47″N 002°25′23″W |
| DFCD | | Didyr Airport | Didyr | 12°33′04″N 002°37′09″W |
| DFCG | | Kongoussi Airport | Kongoussi | 13°19′23″N 001°32′11″W |
| DFCJ | XDJ | Djibo Airport | Djibo | 14°07′34″N 001°37′28″W |
| DFCK | | Koudougou Airport | Koudougou | 12°16′04″N 002°23′15″W |
| DFCL | XLU | Leo Airport | Leo | 11°06′20″N 002°06′06″W |
| DFCP | PUP | Pô Airport | Pô | 11°10′45″N 001°08′55″W |
| DFCR | | Poura Airport | Poura | 11°37′04″N 002°45′09″W |
| DFCS | | Séguénéga Airport | Séguénéga | 13°26′25″N 001°59′35″W |
| DFEA | XBO | Boulsa Airport | Boulsa | 12°39′29″N 000°34′08″W |
| DFEB | XBG | Bogande Airport | Bogande | 12°58′53″N 000°09′45″W |
| DFED | DIP | Diapaga Airport | Diapaga | 12°03′38″N 001°47′06″E |
| DFEE | DOR | Dori Airport | Dori | 14°01′28″N 000°03′55″W |
| DFEF | FNG | Fada N'gourma Airport | Fada N'gourma | 12°02′26″N 000°21′52″E |
| DFEG | XGG | Gorom Gorom Airport | Gorom Gorom | 14°27′19″N 000°13′04″W |
| DFEL | XKA | Kantchari Airport | Kantchari | 12°27′53″N 001°29′37″E |
| DFEM | TMQ | Tambao Airport | Tambao | 14°47′27″N 000°02′28″E |
| DFEP | XPA | Pama Airport | Pama | 11°15′19″N 000°41′54″E |
| DFER | ARL | Arly Airport | Arly | 11°35′47″N 001°28′50″E |
| DFES | XSE | Sebba Airport | Sebba | 13°27′24″N 000°30′12″E |
| DFET | TEG | Tenkodogo Airport | Tenkodogo | 11°48′08″N 000°22′17″W |
| DFEZ | XZA | Zabre Airport | Zabré | 11°09′36″N 000°37′52″W |
| DFFD | OUA | Thomas Sankara International Airport Ouagadougou | Ouagadougou | 12°21′14″N 001°30′43″W |
| DFOA | | Dano Airport | Dano | 11°08′17″N 003°04′28″W |
| DFOB | BNR | Banfora Airport | Banfora | 10°41′22″N 004°43′39″W |
| DFOD | DGU | Dedougou Airport | Dedougou | 12°27′39″N 003°29′19″W |
| DFOG | XGA | Gaoua Airport | Gaoua | 10°22′59″N 003°09′52″W |
| DFOH | | Houndé Airport | Houndé | 11°29′26″N 003°32′27″W |
| DFON | XNU | Nouna Airport | Nouna | 12°44′37″N 003°51′47″W |
| DFOO | BOY | Bobo Dioulasso Airport | Bobo Dioulasso | 11°09′35″N 004°19′52″W |
| DFOR | | Orodara Airport | Orodara | 10°59′13″N 004°55′28″W |
| DFOT | TUQ | Tougan Airport | Tougan | 13°03′33″N 003°04′38″W |
| DFOU | XDE | Diebougou Airport | Diebougou | 10°56′53″N 003°15′00″W |
| DFOY | XAR | Aribinda Airport | Aribinda | 14°12′55″N 000°53′44″W |

== DG - Ghana ==
Also see airport category and list.

| ICAO | IATA | Airport name | Community | Coordinates |
|---|---|---|---|---|
| DGAA | ACC | Accra International Airport | Accra | 05°36′17″N 000°10′03″W |
| DGAH | HZO | Ho Airport | Ho | 06°34′55″N 000°31′46″E |
| DGLE | TML | Tamale Airport | Tamale | 09°33′25″N 000°51′47″W |
| DGLN | | Navrongo Airport | Navrongo | 10°56′34″N 001°05′14″W |
| DGLW | WZA | Wa Airport | Wa | 10°04′57″N 002°30′27″W |
| DGLY | | Yendi Airport | Yendi | 09°25′30″N 000°00′17″W |
| DGSI | KMS | Prempeh I International Airport | Kumasi | 06°42′52″N 001°35′26″W |
| DGSN | NYI | Sunyani Airport | Sunyani | 07°21′42″N 002°19′43″W |
| DGSO | | Obuasi Airport | Obuasi | 06°17′26″N 001°42′05″W |
| DGTK | TKD | Takoradi Airport | Takoradi | 04°53′45″N 001°46′29″W |

== DI - Côte d'Ivoire (Ivory Coast) ==
Also see airport category and list.

| ICAO | IATA | Airport name | Community | Coordinates |
|---|---|---|---|---|
| DIAO | ABO | Aboisso Airport | Aboisso | 05°27′43″N 003°14′05″W |
| DIAP | ABJ | Port Bouet Airport (Felix Houphouet Boigny International Airport) | Abidjan | 05°15′41″N 003°55′33″W |
| DIAU | OGO | Abengourou Airport | Abengourou | 06°42′56″N 003°28′13″W |
| DIBC | | Bocanda Airport | Bocanda | 07°01′59″N 004°31′59″W |
| DIBI | BXI | Boundiali Airport | Boundiali | 09°32′30″N 006°28′20″W |
| DIBK | BYK | Bouake Airport | Bouake | 07°44′20″N 005°04′25″W |
| DIBN | BQO | Tehini Airport | Bouna | 09°15′20″N 003°02′00″W |
| DIBU | BDK | Soko Airport | Bondoukou | 08°01′02″N 002°45′43″W |
| DIDB | | Dabou Airport | Dabou | 05°21′05″N 004°24′13″W |
| DIDK | DIM | Dimbokro Airport | Dimbokro | 06°39′06″N 004°38′26″W |
| DIDL | DJO | Daloa Airport | Daloa | 06°47′34″N 006°28′24″W |
| DIGA | GGN | Gagnoa Airport | Gagnoa | 06°06′12″N 005°59′13″W |
| DIGL | GGO | Guiglo Airport | Guiglo | 06°32′00″N 007°31′30″W |
| DIGN | | Nero-Mer Airport | Grand-Béréby | 04°38′36″N 006°55′26″W |
| DIKO | HGO | Korhogo Airport | Korhogo | 09°23′14″N 005°33′24″W |
| DIMN | MJC | Man Airport | Man | 07°16′20″N 007°35′15″W |
| DIOD | KEO | Odienne Airport | Odienne | 09°32′20″N 007°33′40″W |
| DISG | SEO | Seguela Airport | Seguela | 07°57′36″N 006°38′39″W |
| DISP | SPY | San Pédro Airport | San Pédro | 04°44′48″N 006°39′40″W |
| DISS | ZSS | Sassandra Airport | Sassandra | 04°55′40″N 006°07′58″W |
| DITB | TXU | Tabou Airport | Tabou | 04°26′15″N 007°21′45″W |
| DITM | TOZ | Mahana Airport | Touba | 08°17′45″N 007°40′20″W |
| DIYO | ASK | Yamoussoukro International Airport | Yamoussoukro | 06°54′11″N 005°21′56″W |

== DN - Nigeria ==
Also see airport category and list.

| ICAO | IATA | Airport name | Community | Province or territory | Coordinates |
|---|---|---|---|---|---|
| DNAA | ABV | Nnamdi Azikiwe International Airport | Abuja | Federal Capital Territory (FCT) | 09°00′24″N 007°15′47″E |
| DNAI | QUO | Akwa Ibom International Airport | Uyo | Akwa Ibom State | 04°52′25″N 008°05′40″E |
| DNAK | AKR | Akure Airport | Akure | Ondo State | 07°14′55″N 005°18′05″E |
| DNAN | | Chinua Achebe International Airport | Umueri | Anambra State | 06°16′13″N 006°52′39″E |
| DNAS | ABB | Asaba International Airport | Asaba and Delta State | Delta State | 06°12′15″N 006°39′55″E |
| DNBA | | Bauchi Airport | Bauchi | Bauchi State | 10°17′35″N 009°49′50″E |
| DNBB | | Bebi Airport | Bebi | Cross River State | 06°37′15″N 009°19′10″E |
| DNBC | BCU | Bauchi State Airport | Bauchi | Bauchi State | 10°29′00″N 009°44′40″E |
| DNBE | BNI | Benin Airport | Benin City | Edo State | 06°19′00″N 005°36′00″E |
| DNBI | | Bida Airstrip | Bida | Niger State | 09°06′10″N 006°00′50″E |
| DNBK | | Sir Ahmadu Bello International Airport | Birnin Kebbi | Kebbi State | 12°28′50″N 004°22′10″E |
| DNBY | | Bayelsa International Airport | Amassoma | Bayelsa State | 04°57′30″N 006°12′17″E |
| DNCA | CBQ | Margaret Ekpo International Airport | Calabar | Cross River State | 04°58′33″N 008°20′50″E |
| DNDS | (pending) | Dutse International Airport | Dutse | Jigawa State | 11°47′42″N 009°18′04″E |
| DNEB | | Ebonyi State International Airport | Abakaliki | Ebonyi State | 06°11′49″N 008°01′05″E |
| DNEK | | Eket Airstrip | Eket | Akwa Ibom State | 04°38′34″N 007°56′57″E |
| DNEN | ENU | Akanu Ibiam International Airport | Enugu | Enugu State | 06°28′26″N 007°33′40″E |
| DNFB | | Finima Airstrip | Bonny | Rivers State | 04°24′21″N 007°10′54″E |
| DNGA | | Gateway International Airport | Ilishan Remo | Ogun State | 06°56′21″N 003°42′38″E |
| DNGO | | Brigadier Zakari Maimalari Airport | Gombe | Gombe State | 10°17′56″N 010°54′00″E |
| DNGU | QUS | Gusau Airstrip | Gusau | Zamfara State | 12°10′20″N 006°41′45″E |
| DNIB | IBA | Ibadan Airport | Ibadan | Oyo State | 07°21′35″N 003°58′33″E |
| DNIL | ILR | Ilorin International Airport | Ilorin | Kwara State | 08°26′25″N 004°29′40″E |
| DNIM | QOW | Sam Mbakwe International Cargo Airport | Owerri | Imo State | 05°25′35″N 007°12′20″E |
| DNJA | | Danbaba Danfulani Suntai Airport | Jalingo | Taraba State | 08°54′10″N 011°17′10″E |
| DNJO | JOS | Jos Airport | Jos | Plateau State | 09°38′20″N 008°52′15″E |
| DNKA | KAD | Kaduna International Airport | Kaduna | Kaduna State | 10°41′45″N 007°19′15″E |
| DNKN | KAN | Mallam Aminu Kano International Airport | Kano | Kano State | 12°02′55″N 008°31′20″E |
| DNKT | | Katsina Airport | Katsina | Katsina State | 13°00′25″N 007°39′35″E |
| DNMA | MIU | Maiduguri International Airport | Maiduguri | Borno State | 11°51′20″N 013°04′55″E |
| DNMK | MDI | Makurdi Air Force Base | Makurdi | Benue State | 07°42′10″N 008°36′45″E |
| DNMM | LOS | Murtala Mohammed International Airport | Ikeja | Lagos State | 06°34′38″N 003°19′16″E |
| DNMN | MXJ | Minna Airport | Minna | Niger State | 09°39′05″N 006°27′40″E |
| DNOS | | MKO Abiola International Airport | Osogbo | Osun State | 07°45′50″N 004°28′34″E |
| DNPM | | Port Harcourt NAF Base | Port Harcourt | Rivers State | 04°50′45″N 007°01′15″E |
| DNPO | PHC | Port Harcourt International Airport | Port Harcourt | Rivers State | 05°00′55″N 006°57′00″E |
| DNSO | SKO | Sadiq Abubakar III International Airport | Sokoto | Sokoto State | 12°54′58″N 005°12′25″E |
| DNSU | QRW | Osubi Airstrip | Warri | Delta State | 05°35′50″N 005°49′10″E |
| DNYO | YOL | Yola Airport | Yola | Adamawa State | 09°15′27″N 012°25′49″E |
| DNZA | ZAR | Zaria Airport | Zaria | Kaduna State | 11°07′50″N 007°41′10″E |

== DR - Niger ==
Also see airport category and list.

| ICAO | IATA | Airport name | Community | Coordinates |
|---|---|---|---|---|
| DRRA | | Tessaoua Airport | Tessaoua | 13°46′01″N 008°01′01″E |
| DRRC | | Dogondoutchi Airport | Dogondoutchi | 13°39′45″N 004°06′00″E |
| DRRD | | Dosso Airport | Dosso | 13°02′53″N 003°13′15″E |
| DRRE | | Téra Airport | Téra | 13°57′00″N 000°43′59″E |
| DRRG | | Gaya Airport | Gaya | 11°53′20″N 003°25′40″E |
| DRRL | | Tillabery Airport | Tillabery | 14°12′10″N 001°28′25″E |
| DRRM | MFQ | Maradi Airport | Maradi | 13°30′10″N 007°07′30″E |
| DRRN | NIM | Diori Hamani International Airport | Niamey | 13°28′54″N 002°10′13″E |
| DRRP | | La Tapoa Airport | La Tapoa | 12°28′59″N 002°24′00″E |
| DRRT | THZ | Tahoua Airport | Tahoua | 14°52′30″N 005°15′50″E |
| DRRU | | Ouallam Airport | Ouallam | 14°21′20″N 002°04′10″E |
| DRRZ | | Tillia Airport | Tillia | 16°05′05″N 004°47′17″E |
| DRZA | AJY | Mano Dayak International Airport | Agades South | 16°57′58″N 008°00′00″E |
| DRZD | | Dirkou Airport | Dirkou | 18°58′10″N 012°52′10″E |
| DRZF | | Diffa Airport | Diffa | 13°22′20″N 012°37′30″E |
| DRZG | | Goure Airport | Goure | 13°59′01″N 010°16′30″E |
| DRZI | | Iferouane Airport | Iferouane | 19°04′00″N 008°24′55″E |
| DRZL | RLT | Arlit Airport | Arlit | 18°47′20″N 007°21′36″E |
| DRZR | ZND | Zinder Airport | Zinder | 13°46′44″N 008°59′02″E |

== DT - Tunisia ==
Also see airport category and list.

| ICAO | IATA | Airport name | Community | Coordinates |
|---|---|---|---|---|
| DTKA | TBJ | Tabarka–Ain Draham International Airport | Tabarka | 36°58′48″N 008°52′37″E |
| DTMB | MIR | Monastir - Habib Bourguiba International Airport | Monastir | 35°45′29″N 010°45′17″E |
| DTNH | NBE | Enfidha – Hammamet International Airport | Enfidha | 36°05′31″N 010°24′50″E |
| DTTA | TUN | Tunis - Carthage International Airport | Tunis | 36°51′04″N 010°13′38″E |
| DTTB | OIZ | Bizerte-Sidi Ahmed Air Base | Bizerte | 37°14′44″N 009°47′29″E |
| DTTD | | Remada Air Base | Remada | 32°18′22″N 010°22′56″E |
| DTTF | GAF | Gafsa - Ksar International Airport | Gafsa | 34°25′19″N 008°49′21″E |
| DTTG | GAE | Gabès - Matmata International Airport | Gabès | 33°44′00″N 009°55′06″E |
| DTTI | | Borj El Amri Airport | Borj El Amri | 36°43′16″N 009°56′35″E |
| DTTJ | DJE | Djerba - Zarzis International Airport | Djerba | 33°52′30″N 010°46′31″E |
| DTTR | EBM | El Borma Airport | El Borma | 31°42′15″N 009°15′17″E |
| DTTX | SFA | Thyna/El Maou Airport | Sfax | 34°43′04″N 010°41′27″E |
| DTTZ | TOE | Tozeur - Nefta International Airport | Tozeur | 33°56′23″N 008°06′38″E |

== DX - Togo ==
Also see airport category and list.

| ICAO | IATA | Airport name | Community | Coordinates |
|---|---|---|---|---|
| DXAK | | Akpaka Airport | Atakpame | 07°31′15″N 001°11′30″E |
| DXDP | | Djangou Airport | Dapaong | 10°48′05″N 000°14′32″E |
| DXKP | | Kolokope Airport | Anie | 07°48′12″N 001°17′45″E |
| DXMG | | Sansanné-Mango Airport | Sansanné-Mango | 10°22′20″N 000°28′15″E |
| DXNG | LRL | Niamtougou International Airport | Niamtougou | 09°46′11″N 001°05′34″E |
| DXSK | | Sokode Airport | Sokode | 08°59′40″N 001°09′10″E |
| DXXX | LFW | Lomé-Tokoin Airport | Lomé | 06°09′56″N 001°15′16″E |
