= List of airports by IATA code: X =

IATA	ICAO	Airport name	Location served
-XA-
XAI	ZHXY	Xinyang Minggang Airport	Xinyang, Henan, China
XAL		Álamos Airport	Álamos, Sonora, Mexico
XAP	SBCH	Serafin Enoss Bertaso Airport	Chapecó, Santa Catarina, Brazil
XAR	DFOY	Aribinda Airport	Aribinda, Burkina Faso
XAU	SOOS	Saül Airport	Saül, French Guiana
-XB-
XBB		Blubber Bay Seaplane Base	Blubber Bay, British Columbia, Canada
XBE		Bearskin Lake Airport (TC: CNE3)	Bearskin Lake, Ontario, Canada
XBG	DFEB	Bogande Airport	Bogandé, Burkina Faso
XBJ	OIMB	Birjand International Airport	Birjand, Iran
XBL	HABB	Bedele Airport (Buno Bedele Airport)	Bedele, Ethiopia
XBN		Biniguni Airport	Biniguni, Papua New Guinea
XBO	DFEA	Boulsa Airport	Boulsa, Burkina Faso
XBR		Brockville Regional Tackaberry Airport (TC: CNL3)	Brockville, Ontario, Canada
-XC-
XCH	YPXM	Christmas Island Airport	Christmas Island, Australia
XCL		Cluff Lake Airport (TC: CJS3)	Cluff Lake, Saskatchewan, Canada
XCM	CYCK	Chatham-Kent Airport	Chatham-Kent, Ontario, Canada
XCN		Coron Airport	Coron, Philippines
XCO	YOLA	Colac Airport	Colac, Victoria, Australia
XCR	LFOK	Châlons Vatry Airport	Châlons-en-Champagne, Champagne-Ardenne, France
-XD-
XDE	DFOU	Diébougou Airport	Diébougou, Burkina Faso
XDJ	DFCJ	Djibo Airport	Djibo, Burkina Faso
-XE-
XEN	ZYXC	Xingcheng Airport	Xingcheng, Liaoning, China
XES		Grand Geneva Resort Airport (FAA: C02)	Lake Geneva, Wisconsin, United States
-XF-
XFN	ZHXF	Xiangyang Liuji Airport	Xiangyang, Hubei, China
XFW	EDHI	Hamburg Finkenwerder Airport	Hamburg, Germany
-XG-
XGA	DFOG	Gaoua Airport	Gaoua, Burkina Faso
XGG	DFEG	Gorom Gorom Airport	Gorom-Gorom, Burkina Faso
XGN	FNXA	Xangongo Airport	Xangongo, Angola
XGR	CYLU	Kangiqsualujjuaq (Georges River) Airport	Kangiqsualujjuaq, Quebec, Canada
-XI-
XIC	ZUXC	Xichang Qingshan Airport	Xichang, Sichuan, China
XIE		Xienglom Airport	Xienglom, Laos
XIG		Xinguara Municipal Airport	Xinguara, Pará, Brazil
XIJ	OKAJ	Ahmad al-Jaber Air Base	Al Ahmadi, Kuwait
XIL	ZBXH	Xilinhot Airport	Xilinhot, Inner Mongolia, China
XIN	ZGXN	Xingning Air Base	Xingning, Guangdong, China
XIY	ZLXY	Xi'an Xianyang International Airport	Xi'an, Shaanxi, China
-XJ-
XJD	OTBH	Al Udeid Air Base	Al Rayyan, Qatar
XJM	OPMA	Mangla Airport	Mangla, Pakistan
-XK-
XKA	DFEL	Kantchari Airport	Kantchari, Burkina Faso
XKH	VLXK	Xieng Khouang Airport	Phonsavan, Laos
XKS	CYAQ	Kasabonika Airport	Kasabonika, Ontario, Canada
XKY	DFCA	Kaya Airport	Kaya, Burkina Faso
-XL-
XLB	CZWH	Lac Brochet Airport	Lac Brochet, Manitoba, Canada
XLO		Long Xuyen Airport	Long Xuyên, Vietnam
XLS	GOSS	Saint-Louis Airport	Saint-Louis, Senegal
XLU	DFCL	Leo Airport	Léo, Burkina Faso
XLW	EDWD	Lemwerder Airport	Lemwerder, Lower Saxony, Germany
-XM-
XMA		Maramag Airport	Maramag, Philippines
XMC	YMCO	Mallacoota Airport	Mallacoota, Victoria, Australia
XMD	KMDS	Madison Municipal Airport (FAA: MDS)	Madison, South Dakota, United States
XMG	VNMN	Mahendranagar Airport	Bhimdatta (Mahendranagar), Nepal
XMH	NTGI	Manihi Airport	Manihi, Tuamotus, French Polynesia
XMI	HTMI	Masasi Airport	Masasi, Tanzania
XML	YMIN	Minlaton Airport	Minlaton, South Australia, Australia
XMN	ZSAM	Xiamen Gaoqi International Airport	Xiamen, Fujian, China
XMP		Macmillan Pass Airport (TC: CFC4)	Macmillan Pass, Yukon, Canada
XMS	SEMC	Edmundo Carvajal Airport	Macas, Ecuador
XMY	YYMI	Yam Island Airport	Yam Island, Queensland, Australia
-XN-
XNA	KXNA	Northwest Arkansas Regional Airport	Fayetteville / Springdale, Arkansas, United States
XNG		Quang Ngai Airport	Quang Ngai (Quảng Ngãi), Vietnam
XNH	ORTL	Ali Air Base	Nasiriyah, Iraq
XNN	ZLXN	Xining Caojiabao Airport	Xining, Qinghai, China
XNT	ZBXT	Xingtai Dalian Airport	Xingtai, Hebei, China
XNU	DFON	Nouna Airport	Nouna, Burkina Faso
-XP-
XPA	DFEP	Pama Airport	Pama, Burkina Faso
XPK	CZFG	Pukatawagan Airport	Pukatawagan, Manitoba, Canada
XPL	MHSC	Soto Cano Air Base	Comayagua, Honduras
XPP	CZNG	Poplar River Airport	Poplar River, Manitoba, Canada
XPR	KIEN	Pine Ridge Airport (FAA: IEN)	Pine Ridge, South Dakota, United States
-XQ-
XQP	MRQP	Quepos La Managua Airport	Quepos, Costa Rica
XQU		Qualicum Beach Airport (TC: CAT4)	Qualicum Beach, British Columbia, Canada
-XR-
XRH	YSRI	RAAF Base Richmond	Richmond, New South Wales, Australia
XRQ		Xinbarag Youqi Baogede Airport	Xinbarag Youqi, Inner Mongolia, China
XRR	CYDM	Ross River Airport	Ross River, Yukon, Canada
XRY	LEJR	Jerez Airport (La Parra Airport)	Jerez de la Frontera, Andalusia, Spain
-XS-
XSB	OMBY	Sir Bani Yas Airport	Sir Bani Yas, United Arab Emirates
XSC	MBSC	South Caicos Airport	South Caicos, British Overseas Territory of Turks and Caicos Islands
XSD	KTNX	Tonopah Test Range Airport (FAA: TNX)	Tonopah, Nevada, United States
XSE	DFES	Sebba Airport	Sebba, Burkina Faso
XSI	CZSN	South Indian Lake Airport	South Indian Lake, Manitoba, Canada
XSO	RPNO	Siocon Airport	Siocon, Philippines
XSP	WSSL	Seletar Airport	Singapore
-XT-
XTA	KXTA	Homey Airport	Groom Lake, Southern Nevada, United States
XTG	YTGM	Thargomindah Airport	Thargomindah, Queensland, Australia
XTL	CYBQ	Tadoule Lake Airport	Tadoule Lake, Manitoba, Canada
XTO	YTAM	Taroom Airport	Taroom, Queensland, Australia
XTR	YTAA	Tara Airport	Tara, Queensland, Australia
-XU-
XUZ	ZSXZ	Xuzhou Guanyin Airport	Xuzhou, Jiangsu, China
-XV-
XVL		Vinh Long Airport	Vinh Long (Vĩnh Long), Vietnam
-XW-
XWA	KXWA	Williston Basin International Airport	Williston, North Dakota, United States
-XY-
XYA	AGGY	Yandina Airport	Yandina, Solomon Islands
XYE	VYYE	Ye Airport	Ye, Myanmar
XYR	AYED	Edwaki Airport	Yellow River, Papua New Guinea
-XZ-
XZA	DFEZ	Zabré Airport	Zabré, Burkina Faso
