= List of airports in Burkina Faso =

This is a list of airports in Burkina Faso, sorted by location.

== Airports ==
City	Province	ICAO	IATA	Airport name	Coordinates	Runway
Aribinda	Soum	DFOY	XAR	Aribinda Airport	14°12′55″N 0°53′44″W	Grass
Arly	Tapoa	DFER	ARL	Arly Airport	11°35′46.9″N 1°28′49.8″E	03/21: 4,400 x 118, grass
Banfora	Komoé	DFOB	BNR	Banfora Airport	10°41′21.7″N 4°43′39.1″W	03/21: 3,750 x 59, grass
Barsalogho	Sanmatenga	DFCB		Barsalogho Airport	13°24′0.1″N 1°3′48.1″W	05/23: 1,920 x 69, grass
Bobo Dioulasso	Houet	DFOO	BOY	Bobo Dioulasso Airport	11°9′35.3″N 4°19′52.4″W	06/24: 10,800 x 138, asphalt
Bogandé	Gnagna	DFEB	XBG	Bogandé Airport	12°58′53.0″N 0°9′45.4″W	11/29: 2,610 x 72, grass
Boromo	Balé	DFCO		Boromo Airport closed	11°45′51.9″N 2°55′47.4″W	07/25: 1,250 x 62, dirt
Boulsa	Namentenga	DFEA	XBO	Boulsa Airport	12°39′28.7″N 0°34′7.6″W	05/23: 1,530 x 66, dirt
Dano	Ioba	DFOA		Dano Airport	11°8′17.0″N 3°4′27.5″W	06/24: 1,800 x 69, grass
Dédougou	Mouhoun	DFOD	DGU	Dédougou Airport	12°27′38.9″N 3°29′18.8″W	06/24: 8,480 x 105, grass
Diapaga	Tapoa	DFED	DIP	Diapaga Airport	12°3′37.7″N 1°47′5.6″E	04/22: 3,900 x 98, dirt
Didyr	Sanguié	DFCD		Didyr Airport	12°33′4.2″N 2°37′8.7″W	13/31: 1,500 x 52, grass
Diébougou	Bougouriba	DFOU	XDE	Diébougou Airport	10°56′53.4″N 3°14′59.5″W	07/25: 5,250 x 69, dirt
Djibo	Soum	DFCJ	XDJ	Djibo Airport	14°7′33.6″N 1°37′27.6″W	04/22: 3,900 x 92, dirt
Dori	Séno	DFEE	DOR	Dori Airport	14°1′28.3″N 0°3′55.3″W	05/23: 2,300 x 98, dirt
Fada N'Gourma	Gourma	DFEF	FNG	Fada N'Gourma Airport	12°2′26.4″N 0°21′51.6″E	04/22: 3,250 x 59, dirt
Gaoua	Poni	DFOG	XGA	Gaoua Airport	10°22′58.8″N 3°9′51.8″W	06/24: 4,900 x 102, grass
Gorom Gorom	Oudalan	DFEG	XGG	Gorom Gorom Airport	14°27′19.3″N 0°13′3.7″W	05/23: 5,410 x 105, grass
Houndé	Tuy	DFOH		Houndé Airport	11°29′26.2″N 3°32′26.8″W	18/36: 1,920 x 89, gravel 08/26: 2,560 x 79, grass
Kantchari	Tapoa	DFEL	XKA	Kantchari Airport	12°27′52.7″N 1°29′36.9″E	06/24: 2,990 x 46, dirt
Kaya	Sanmatenga	DFCA	XKY	Kaya Airport	13°4′38.5″N 1°6′1.0″W	08/26: 1,960 x 92, grass
Kongoussi	Bam	DFCG		Kongoussi Airport	13°19′23.0″N 1°32′11.2″W	07/25: 2,600 x 66, grass
Koudougou	Sanguié	DFCK		Koudougou Airport	12°16′3.5″N 2°23′14.7″W	06/24: 2,940 x 118, grass
Leo	Sissili	DFCL	XLU	Leo Airport	11°6′19.5″N 2°6′5.8″W	08/26: 1,380 x 69, grass
Nouna	Kossi	DFON	XNU	Nouna Airport	12°44′36.7″N 3°51′46.9″W	09/27: 4,250 x 141, grass
Orodara	Kénédougou	DFOR		Orodara Airport	10°59′12.5″N 4°55′28.1″W	04/22: 4,900 x 105, grass
Ouagadougou	Kadiogo	DFFD	OUA	Thomas Sankara International Airport Ouagadougou	12°21′13.5″N 1°30′43.2″W	04L/22R: 9,900 x 148, asphalt 04R/22L: 6,200 x 89, grass
Ouahigouya	Yatenga	DFCC	OUG	Ouahigouya Airport	13°33′46.6″N 2°25′23.3″W	09/27: 5,550 x 105, grass
Pama	Kompienga	DFEP	XPA	Pama Airport	11°15′18.8″N 0°41′53.6″E	09/27: 2,480 x 89, grass
Pô	Nahouri	DFCP	PUP	Pô Airport	11°10′44.9″N 1°8′54.5″W	10/28: 3,460 x 79, dirt
Poura	Balé	DFCR		Poura Airport	11°37′3.9″N 2°45′8.7″W	09/27: 1,960 x 85, grass
Sebba	Yagha	DFES	XSE	Sebba Airport	13°27′24″N 0°30′12″E	Grass
Séguénéga	Yatenga	DFCS		Séguénéga Airport	13°26′24.8″N 1°59′34.6″W	10/28: 1,450 x 92, dirt
Tambao	Oudalan	DFEM	TMQ	Tambao Airport	14°47′27″N 0°2′28″E	
Tenkodogo	Boulgou	DFET	TEG	Tenkodogo Airport	11°48′8.4″N 0°22′17.4″W	17/35: 3,950 x 125, dirt
Tougan	Sourou	DFOT	TUQ	Tougan Airport	13°3′32.6″N 3°4′38.1″W	10/28: 1,950 x 95, grass
Yako	Passoré	DFCY		Yako Airport Closed	12°57′21″N 2°16′28″W	07/25: 2,900 x 174, grass
Zabré	Boulgou	DFEZ	XZA	Zabré Airport	11°9′36″N 0°37′52″W	18/36

== See also ==
- Transport in Burkina Faso
- List of airports by ICAO code: D#DF - Burkina Faso
- Wikipedia: WikiProject Aviation/Airline destination lists: Africa#Burkina Faso
