= Yako =

Yako may refer to

- Yako (name)
- Yako Bank Uganda Limited, a Ugandan Tier II credit institution
- Yako (fox), a Japanese spirit possession of foxes
- Yakō Station, a railway station in Yokohama, Kanagawa Prefecture, Japan
- Yakö people of Nigeria
  - Yakö language of Yakö people
- Yako Department in Burkina Faso
  - Yako, Burkina Faso, a town and capital of Yako Department
  - Yako Airport, former airport near Yako, Burkina Faso

== See also ==
- Iaco River
- Yaako
- Yakko, a character from Animaniacs
