= XSE =

Xse or XSE may refer to:

- XSE, IATA code of Sebba Airport
- Xsé, fictional lien in Chilean comics about Mampato
- X.S.E., mutant organizations in the Marvel Comics universe
- XSE model or cars:
  - Toyota Camry XSE
  - Peugeot 308 XSE
- XSE-1, XSE-2, variants of the Bellanca SE monoplane
- XSE, variation of the Colt Commander pistol
- xse, ISO 639-3 code of the Sempan language
