= DFOA =

DFOA may refer to:

- Dano Airport, Burkina Faso
- Deferoxamine, a medicine
