= XBG =

XBG or xbg may refer to:

- Bogande Airport (IATA: XBG), a public use airport located near Bogandé, Gnagna, Burkina Faso
- Bungandidj language (ISO 639-3: xbg), an extinct language of South Australia
- The XBG-Antenna also called HB9XBG Antenna is a vertical half wave center fed dipole for Short Wave Radio Amateurs
