= XEP =

XEP may refer to:

- XEP (software), an XML to PDF converter
- Isthmian script (ISO 639-3 code)
- XMPP Extension Protocol, in the XMPP Standards Foundation
- Chi Epsilon Pi, a US honor society
- XEP-AM, a radio station in Mexico
- Épernay - Plivot Airport (IATA code), in the List of airports by IATA code
- Athis Airfield (IATA code), a former airport
- Swiss Cosmetic Activen Brand, a cosmetic active from a Swiss based company.
