= Gorom-Gorom Department =

Department in Oudalan Province, Burkina Faso

Coordinates: 14.45°N 0.233333°W

Gorom-Gorom
- Department
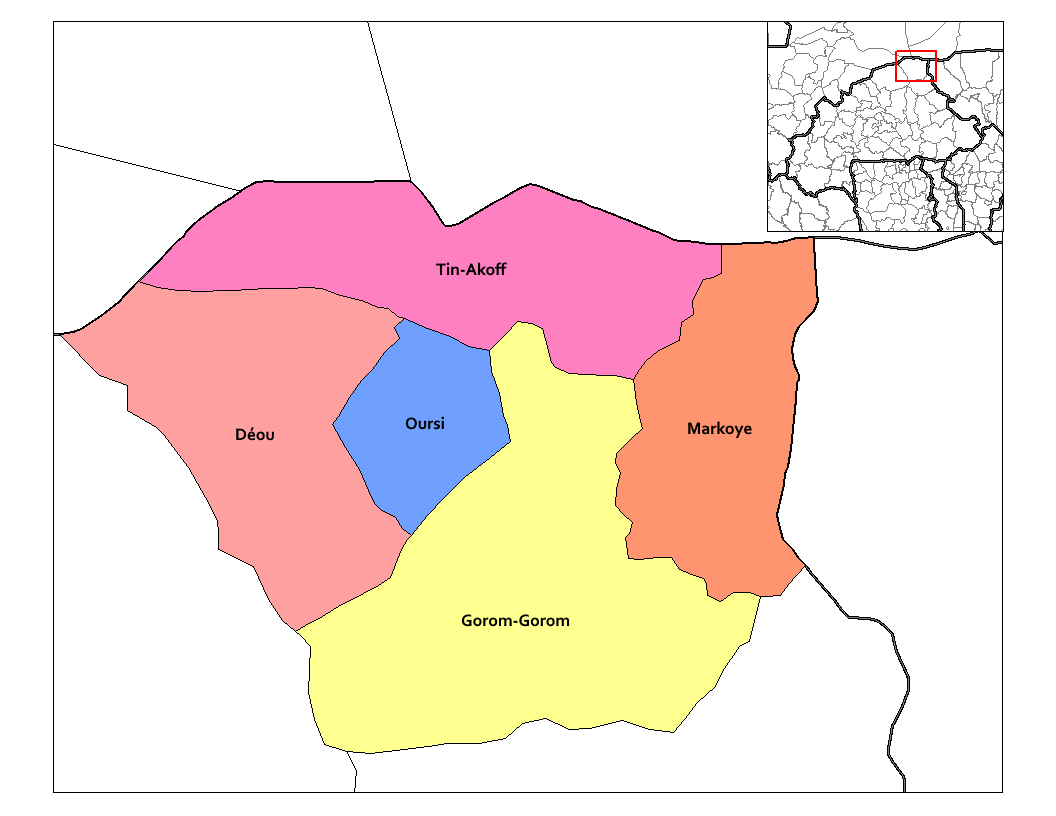
- Gorom-Gorom Department location in the province
- Country: Burkina Faso
- Province: Oudalan Province

Area
  - Department: 1,276 sq mi (3,305 km^{2})

Population (2019 census)
  - Department: 72,407
  - Density: 56.74/sq mi (21.91/km^{2})
  - Urban: 9,752
- Time zone: UTC+0 (GMT 0)

Gorom-Gorom is a department or commune of Oudalan Province in northern Burkina Faso. Its capital is the town of Gorom-Gorom.
