= Séguénéga Department =

Coordinates: 13.4330°N 1.9670°W

Séguénéga
- Department
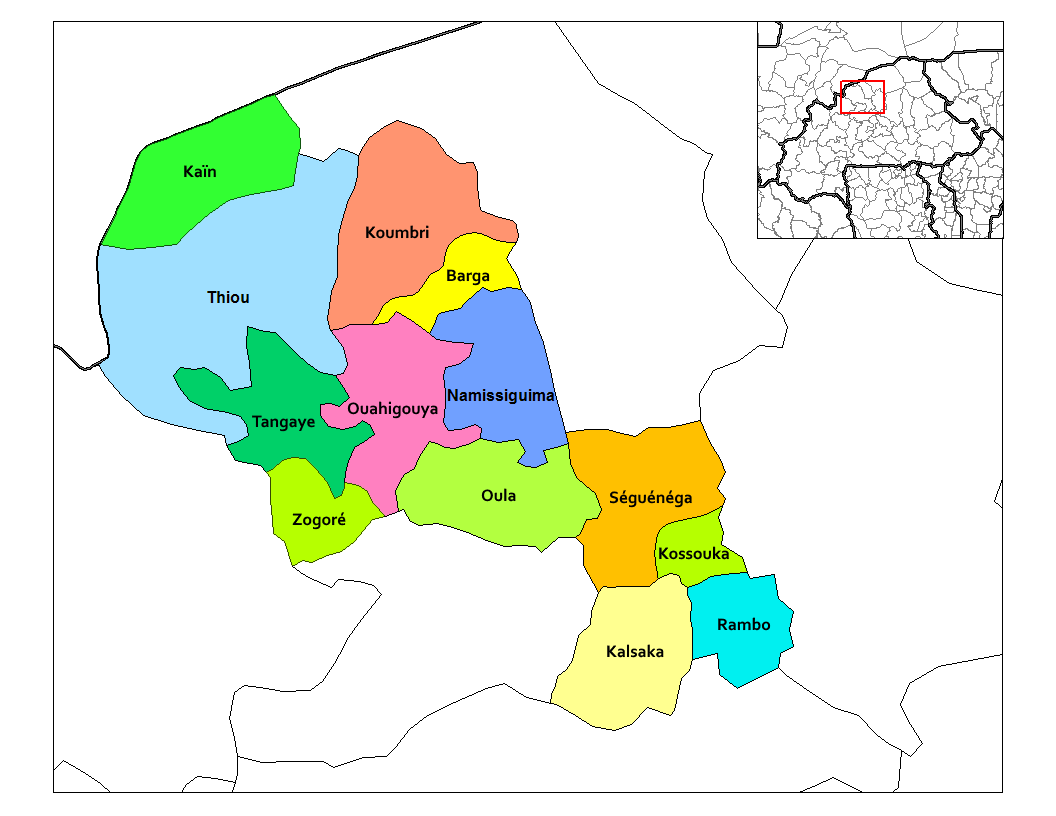
- Séguénéga Department location in the province
- Country: Burkina Faso
- Province: Yatenga Province

Area
  - Total: 258.5 sq mi (669.4 km^{2})

Population (2019 census)
  - Total: 98,637
- Time zone: UTC+0 (GMT 0)

Séguénéga is a department or commune of Yatenga Province in northern Burkina Faso. Its capital lies at the town of Ouahigouya.

== Towns and villages ==
- Séguénéga
