= OUG =

OUG may refer to:

- Overseas Union Garden, a main township in the Seputeh constituency in south-western Kuala Lumpur, Malaysia
- Ouahigouya Airport, the IATA code OUG
