= DFCC =

DFCC can refer to:

- DFCC Bank, Sri Lanka
- Ouahigouya Airport, Burkina Faso
- Dublin Film Critics' Circle, Ireland
- Dedicated Freight Corridor Corporation of India, India
