= XBB =

XBB may refer to:

- SARS-CoV-2 Omicron variant § XBB, a subvariant of the virus that causes COVID-19
- The aboriginal Lower Burdekin languages of Australia
- The European Monetary Unit used in bond markets
- Blubber Bay Seaplane Base, British Columbia, Canada – see List of airports by IATA airport code: X
