= XLU =

XLU or xlu may refer to:

- XLU, the IATA code for Leo Airport, Sissili, Burkina Faso
- xlu, the ISO 639-3 code for Cuneiform Luwian language, Hittite Empire, Arzawa and Neo-Hittite kingdoms
