= Dori Airport =

- IATA: DOR; ICAO: DFEE

Summary
- Airport type: Public
- Serves: Dori
- Location: Burkina Faso
- Elevation AMSL: 909 ft / 277 m
- Coordinates: 14°1′28.3″N 0°3′55.3″W

Map
- Location of Dori Airport in Burkina Faso

Runways
Direction	Length		Surface
Direction	ft	m	Surface
05/23	2,300	701	Dirt
- Source: Landings.com

Dori Airport (IATA: DOR, ICAO: DFEE) is a public use airport located 2 nm west of Dori, Séno, Burkina Faso.

== Accidents and incidents ==
- On October 8, 1988, a de Havilland Canada DHC-6 Twin Otter 300 (XT-AAX) of Air Burkina crashed during takeoff and was written off. It is unknown if anyone was killed.
- On August 15, 1991, a Fokker F-27 Friendship 100 (J5-GBB) of Air Bissau attempted to make an emergency landing on a ferry flight from Kano to Bamako after the crew became disoriented. The plane hit trees during landing and broke up, killing all 3 occupants.

== See also ==
- List of airports in Burkina Faso
