= Tambao Airport =

Airport in Oudalan, Burkina Faso

- IATA: TMQ; ICAO: DFEM

Summary
- Serves: Tambao, Oudalan Province, Sahel Region, Burkina Faso
- Location: Burkina Faso
- Elevation AMSL: 250 m (820 ft)
- Coordinates: 14°47′25″N 0°02′20″E

Maps
- Sahel Region in Burkina Faso

- Location of the airport in Burkina Faso

Runways
Direction	Length		Surface
Direction	ft	m	Surface
07/25	3,610	1,100	Sand
- Source: Bing Maps Landings.com, Google, STV

Tambao Airport (IATA: TMQ, ICAO: DFEM) is an airstrip serving the manganese mining site of Tambao in the Oudalan Province, part of the Sahel Region of Burkina Faso.

== See also ==
- List of airports in Burkina Faso
