= Tambao =

Mine in Centre-Nord, Burkina Faso

- Location within Burkina Faso
- Location: Mine site, Centre-Nord, Burkina Faso; 14°45′01″N 00°03′10″E
- Opened: 1993
- Active: 1993, 2004, planning 2011

Tambao is a Manganese deposit and potential mine site in the Oudalan Province, located in the Sahel Region, which the far northeastern part of Burkina Faso. Tambao has been estimated, when exploited, to be one of the largest deposits in the region. Its development, a major priority of the Burkinabe state, has been an on and off project since the 1990s. Barely served by roads or other infrastructure, the Tambao reserves are some 210 kilometres (130 mi) north of Kaya and 350 kilometres (220 mi) northeast of the capital, namely Ouagadougou. The Tambao Airport has been recently built to serve the deposit and the corresponding villages.

== Industry ==
Manganese is mined here. For at least two decades it has been considered the most potentially lucrative mining resource in Burkina, and is believed the region's largest Manganese deposit, estimated at 20 million tonnes at %52 to %53 Manganese to ore, making it one of the cryptomelane-richest ore resources in the world. The site's inaccessibility and lack of infrastructure have prevented wide scale exploitation. Most recently, in 2010, mining companies refused bid on construction of the necessary infrastructure for mining unless the government granted them mining concessions in the area.

In 1993 InterStar Mining carried out 6 months of operations here, but were plagued by lack of supportive resources. Large scale exploitation was only again attempted by the Fompex consortium in 2004 and was quickly halted. Apart from total lack of operations infrastructure (power, water, construction or employment base) the biggest hurdle to commercial exploitation of the Tambao reserves is the lack of an all weather roadway capable of supporting the transport fleet needed to move ore the 210 kilometres (130 mi) to Kaya, the nearest city connected to the Burkinabe road network.

In 2010, the Burkinabe government carried out talks with investors from India aimed at building a 250 km railway line from Tambao to Kaya. Later that year, the Burkinabe government tendered a series of openings for mining operations in Tambao, with Wadi Al Rawda Industrial Investments one early candidate thought likely to gain at least some concession.

In 2010 two consortia emerged offering to develop an integrated mining and rail system which, in some proposals, would not only mine and process ore, but build longer rail lines to feed into the Ivorian rail network for export at the port of Abidjan. Major contenders were a Singaporean/Indian joint venture, the Nice Group company, and a tie up of the Japanese firm Mitsui Rail Capital and Brazilian mining giant Vale S.A.

== Transport ==
An extension of the Abidjan-Niger Railway was approved in 2014 and service was expected to begin by the end of 2016. The Tambao Airport serves the deposit and corresponding villages.

== See also ==
- Transport in Burkina Faso
- Railway stations in Burkina Faso
