= Zabré Airport =

Airport in Burkina Faso

Zabré Airport Aérodrome de Zabré
- IATA: XZA; ICAO: DFEZ

Summary
- Airport type: Public
- Serves: Zabré, Burkina Faso
- Elevation AMSL: 886 ft / 270 m
- Coordinates: 11°10′10″N 000°37′20″W
- Interactive map of Zabré Airport

Runways
Direction	Length		Surface
Direction	m	ft	Surface
07/25	750	2,460	Dirt
- Source: Google Maps

Zabré Airport (IATA: XZA, ICAO: DFEZ) is an airport serving Zabré in Burkina Faso. It is 2 kilometres (1.2 mi) southeast of the town.

== See also ==
- List of airports in Burkina Faso
