= Yako Airport =

Airport in Passoré, Burkina Faso

- IATA: none; ICAO: DFCY

Summary
- Airport type: Public
- Serves: Yako
- Location: Burkina Faso
- Elevation AMSL: 984 ft / 300 m
- Coordinates: 12°57′21″N 2°16′28″W

Map
- Location of Yako Airport in Burkina Faso

Runways
Direction	Length		Surface
Direction	ft	m	Surface
Closed
- Sources: Landings.com Google Maps

Yako Airport (ICAO: DFCY) was a public use airport located near Yako, Passoré Province, Burkina Faso.

Google Earth Historical Imagery shows a 600 metres (2,000 ft) dirt runway 07/25 at the listed coordinates in December 2001, but the area has since been built over with structures.

== See also ==
- List of airports in Burkina Faso
