= Didyr Airport =

Airport in Sanguié, Burkina Faso

- IATA: none; ICAO: DFCD

Summary
- Airport type: Public
- Serves: Didyr
- Location: Burkina Faso
- Elevation AMSL: 958 ft / 292 m
- Coordinates: 12°33′4.2″N 2°37′8.7″W

Map
- Location of Didyr Airport in Burkina Faso

Runways
Direction	Length		Surface
Direction	ft	m	Surface
13/31	1,500	457	Grass
- Source: Landings.com

Didyr Airport (ICAO: DFCD) is a public use airport located near Didyr, Sanguié, Burkina Faso.

== See also ==
- List of airports in Burkina Faso
