= Djibo Airport =

Airport in Soum, Burkina Faso

- IATA: XDJ; ICAO: DFCJ

Summary
- Serves: Djibo, Soum Province, Sahel Region, Burkina Faso
- Location: Burkina Faso
- Elevation AMSL: 305 m / 1,001 ft
- Coordinates: 14°07′30″N 001°37′29″W

Maps
- Sahel Region in Burkina Faso

- Location of the airport in Burkina Faso

Runways
Direction	Length		Surface
Direction	m	ft	Surface
04/22	1,189	3,901	Dirt
- Source: Landings.com, Google, STV

Djibo Airport (IATA: XDJ, ICAO: DFCJ) is an airport serving the village of Djibo in the Soum Province, part of the Sahel Region of Burkina Faso.

== See also ==
- List of airports in Burkina Faso
