= Fada N'gourma Airport =

Airport in Gourma, Burkina Faso

Fada N'Gourma Airport
- IATA: FNG; ICAO: DFEF

Summary
- Airport type: Public
- Serves: Fada N'Gourma
- Location: Burkina Faso
- Elevation AMSL: 1,014 ft / 309 m
- Coordinates: 12°2′26.4″N 0°21′51.6″E

Map
- Location of Fada N'Gourma Airport in Burkina Faso

Runways
Direction	Length		Surface
Direction	ft	m	Surface
04/22	3,250	991	Dirt
- Source: Landings.com

Fada N'Gourma Airport (IATA: FNG, ICAO: DFEF) is a public use airport located 1 nm south-southeast of Fada N'Gourma, Gourma, Burkina Faso.

== See also ==
- List of airports in Burkina Faso
