= Diapaga Airport =

Airport in Tapoa, Burkina Faso

- IATA: DIP; ICAO: DFED

Summary
- Airport type: Public
- Serves: Diapaga
- Location: Burkina Faso
- Elevation AMSL: 951 ft / 290 m
- Coordinates: 12°3′37.7″N 1°47′5.6″E

Map
- Location of Diapaga Airport in Burkina Faso

Runways
Direction	Length		Surface
Direction	ft	m	Surface
04/22	3,900	1,189	Dirt
- Source: Landings.com

Diapaga Airport (IATA: DIP, ICAO: DFED) is a public use airport located near Diapaga, Tapoa, Burkina Faso.

== See also ==
- List of airports in Burkina Faso
