= Koudougou Airport =

Airport in Sanguié, Burkina Faso

- IATA: none; ICAO: DFCK

Summary
- Airport type: Public
- Serves: Koudougou
- Location: Burkina Faso
- Elevation AMSL: 1,001 ft / 305 m
- Coordinates: 12°16′3.5″N 2°23′14.7″W

Map
- Location of Koudougou Airport in Burkina Faso

Runways
Direction	Length		Surface
Direction	ft	m	Surface
06/24	2,940	896	Grass
- Source: Landings.com

Koudougou Airport (ICAO: DFCK) is a public use airport located near Koudougou, Sanguié, Burkina Faso.

== See also ==
- List of airports in Burkina Faso
