= Séguénéga Airport =

Airport in Yatenga, Burkina Faso

- IATA: none; ICAO: DFCS

Summary
- Airport type: Public
- Serves: Séguénéga
- Location: Burkina Faso
- Elevation AMSL: 1,139 ft (347 m)
- Coordinates: 13°26′24.8″N 1°59′34.6″W

Map
- Location of Séguénéga Airport in Burkina Faso

Runways
Direction	Length		Surface
Direction	ft	m	Surface
10/28	1,840	560	Dirt
- Source: Landings.com

Séguénéga Airport (ICAO: DFCS) is a public use airstrip located near Séguénéga, Yatenga Province, Burkina Faso. The runway runs 50 metres (160 ft) south of and parallel with the N15 road.

== See also ==
- List of airports in Burkina Faso
