= Kantchari Airport =

Airport in Tapoa, Burkina Faso

- IATA: XKA; ICAO: DFEL

Summary
- Airport type: Public
- Serves: Kantchari
- Location: Burkina Faso
- Elevation AMSL: 879 ft / 268 m
- Coordinates: 12°27′52.7″N 1°29′36.9″E

Map
- Location of Kantchari Airport in Burkina Faso

Runways
Direction	Length		Surface
Direction	ft	m	Surface
06/24	2,990	911	Dirt
- Source: Landings.com

Kantchari Airport (IATA: XKA, ICAO: DFEL) is a public use airport located near Kantchari, Tapoa, Burkina Faso.

== See also ==
- List of airports in Burkina Faso
