= Barsalogho Airport =

Airport in Sanmatenga, Burkina Faso

- IATA: none; ICAO: DFCB

Summary
- Airport type: Public
- Serves: Barsalogho
- Location: Burkina Faso
- Elevation AMSL: 1,083 ft / 330 m
- Coordinates: 13°24′0.1″N 1°3′48.1″W

Map
- Location of Barsalogho Airport in Burkina Faso

Runways
Direction	Length		Surface
Direction	ft	m	Surface
05/23	1,920	585	Dirt
- Source: Burkina Faso AIP Landings.com

Barsalogho Airport (ICAO: DFCB) is a public use airport located near Barsalogho, Sanmatenga, Burkina Faso. The single runway is unmarked except for the remains of the end marker at the north end and may be unusable.

== See also ==
- List of airports in Burkina Faso
