= Houndé Airport =

Airport in Tuy, Burkina Faso

- IATA: none; ICAO: DFOH

Summary
- Airport type: Public
- Serves: Houndé
- Location: Burkina Faso
- Elevation AMSL: 1,063 ft / 324 m
- Coordinates: 11°29′28.36″N 3°30′46.14″W

Map
- Location of Houndé Airport in Burkina Faso

Runways
Direction	Length		Surface
Direction	ft	m	Surface
18/36	1,920	585	Gravel
08/26	2,560	780	Grass
- Source: Landings.com

Houndé Airport (ICAO: DFOH) is a public use airport located near Houndé, Tuy, Burkina Faso.

== See also ==
- List of airports in Burkina Faso
