= Dédougou Airport =

Airport in Mouhoun, Burkina Faso

- IATA: DGU; ICAO: DFOD

Summary
- Airport type: Public
- Serves: Dédougou
- Location: Burkina Faso
- Elevation AMSL: 984 ft / 300 m
- Coordinates: 12°27′38.9″N 3°29′18.8″W

Map
- Location of Dédougou Airport in Burkina Faso

Runways
Direction	Length		Surface
Direction	ft	m	Surface
06/24	8,480	2,585	Grass
- Source: Landings.com

Dédougou Airport (IATA: DGU, ICAO: DFOD) is a public use airport located near Dédougou, Mouhoun, Burkina Faso.

== See also ==
- List of airports in Burkina Faso
