= Orodara Airport =

Airport in Kénédougou, Burkina Faso

- IATA: none; ICAO: DFOR

Summary
- Airport type: Public
- Serves: Orodara
- Location: Burkina Faso
- Elevation AMSL: 1,706 ft / 520 m
- Coordinates: 10°59′12.5″N 4°55′28.1″W

Map
- Location of Orodara Airport in Burkina Faso

Runways
Direction	Length		Surface
Direction	ft	m	Surface
04/22	4,900	1,494	Grass
- Source: Landings.com

Orodara Airport (ICAO: DFOR) is a public use airport located 1 nm northwest of Orodara, Kénédougou, Burkina Faso.

== See also ==
- List of airports in Burkina Faso
