= Tenkodogo Airport =

Airport in Boulgou, Burkina Faso

- IATA: TEG; ICAO: DFET

Summary
- Airport type: Public
- Serves: Tenkodogo
- Location: Burkina Faso
- Elevation AMSL: 1,017 ft (310 m)
- Coordinates: 11°48′8.4″N 0°22′17.4″W

Map
- Location of Tenkodogo Airport in Burkina Faso

Runways
Direction	Length		Surface
Direction	ft	m	Surface
17/35	3,950	1,204	Dirt
- Source: Landings.com

Tenkodogo Airport (IATA: TEG, ICAO: DFET) is a public use airport located near Tenkodogo, Boulgou, Burkina Faso.

== See also ==
- List of airports in Burkina Faso
