= Arly Airport =

Airport in Tapoa, Burkina Faso

- IATA: ARL; ICAO: DFER

Summary
- Airport type: Public
- Serves: Arly
- Location: Burkina Faso
- Elevation AMSL: 761 ft / 232 m
- Coordinates: 11°35′50.366″N 1°28′53.115″E

Map
- Location of Arly Airport in Burkina Faso

Runways
Direction	Length		Surface
Direction	ft	m	Surface
04/22	4,625	1,300	Grass
- Source: Burkina Faso AIP

Arly Airport (IATA: ARL, ICAO: DFER) is a public use airport located near Arli National Park or Arly, Tapoa Province, Burkina Faso. While the runway outline is clearly visible, it appears overgrown with vegetation and may be unusable. However, the airfield is still listed in the official ASECNA Aeronautical Information Publication for Burkina Faso and has an official IATA 3-letter code, though its 4-letter code does not appear to be recognised by ICAO.

== See also ==
- List of airports in Burkina Faso
