= Pô Airport =

Airport in Nahouri, Burkina Faso

- IATA: PUP; ICAO: DFCP

Summary
- Airport type: Public
- Serves: Pô
- Location: Burkina Faso
- Elevation AMSL: 1,056 ft / 322 m
- Coordinates: 11°10′44.9″N 1°8′54.5″W

Map
- Location of Pô Airport in Burkina Faso

Runways
Direction	Length		Surface
Direction	ft	m	Surface
10/28	3,460	1,055	Dirt
- Source: Landings.com

Pô Airport (IATA: PUP, ICAO: DFCP) is a public use airport located in northwest Pô, Nahouri, Burkina Faso.

== See also ==
- List of airports in Burkina Faso
