= Séguénéga =

Town in Burkina Faso

- Location in Burkina Faso
- Coordinates: 13°26′11″N 1°57′51″W
- Country: Burkina Faso
- Region: North Region
- Province: Yatenga Province
- Department: Séguénéga Department
- Time zone: UTC+0 (GMT 0)

Séguénéga is a small town and the capital of the department of Séguénéga located in the Yatenga Province of the North Region of Burkina Faso.

== Infrastructure ==
- Séguénéga Airport

== Demographics ==
In 2006, the town had 18,314 inhabitants.

== See also ==
- List of cities in Burkina Faso
