= Pama Airport =

Airport in Kompienga, Burkina Faso

- IATA: XPA; ICAO: DFEP

Summary
- Airport type: Public
- Serves: Pama
- Location: Burkina Faso
- Elevation AMSL: 699 ft / 213 m
- Coordinates: 11°15′18.8″N 0°41′53.6″E

Map
- Location of Pama Airport in Burkina Faso

Runways
Direction	Length		Surface
Direction	ft	m	Surface
09/27	2,480	756	Grass
- Source: Bing Landings.com

Pama Airport (IATA: XPA, ICAO: DFEP) is a public use airport located near Pama, Kompienga Province, Burkina Faso.

== See also ==
- List of airports in Burkina Faso
