= Kongoussi Airport =

Airport in Bam, Burkina Faso

- IATA: none; ICAO: DFCG

Summary
- Airport type: Public
- Serves: Kongoussi
- Location: Burkina Faso
- Elevation AMSL: 1,056 ft / 322 m
- Coordinates: 13°19′23.0″N 1°32′11.2″W

Map
- Location of Kongoussi Airport in Burkina Faso

Runways
Direction	Length		Surface
Direction	ft	m	Surface
07/25	2,600	792	Grass
- Source: Landings.com

Kongoussi Airport (ICAO: DFCG) is a public use airport located near Kongoussi, Bam, Burkina Faso.

== See also ==
- List of airports in Burkina Faso
