= Banfora Airport =

Airport in Comoé, Burkina Faso

- IATA: BNR; ICAO: DFOB

Summary
- Airport type: Public
- Serves: Banfora
- Location: Burkina Faso
- Elevation AMSL: 984 ft / 300 m
- Coordinates: 10°41′22.070″N 4°43′38.784″W

Map
- Location of Banfora Airport in Burkina Faso

Runways
Direction	Length		Surface
Direction	ft	m	Surface
03/21	1,919	585	Dirt
- Source: Burkina Faso AIP

Banfora Airport (IATA: BNR, ICAO: DFOB) is a public use airport located 4 nm north-northeast of Banfora, Comoé, Burkina Faso.

== See also ==
- List of airports in Burkina Faso
