= Tougan Airport =

Airport in Sourou, Burkina Faso

- IATA: TUQ; ICAO: DFOT

Summary
- Airport type: Public
- Serves: Tougan
- Location: Burkina Faso
- Elevation AMSL: 984 ft (300 m)
- Coordinates: 13°3′32.6″N 3°4′38.1″W

Map
- Location of Tougan Airport in Burkina Faso

Runways
Direction	Length		Surface
Direction	ft	m	Surface
10/28	1,950	594	Grass
- Source: Landings.com

Tougan Airport (IATA: TUQ, ICAO: DFOT) is a public use airport located near Tougan, Sourou, Burkina Faso.

== See also ==
- List of airports in Burkina Faso
