= X.S.E. =

X.S.E. refers to a comic book series and two mutant organisations within the Marvel Universe:

- Xavier's Security Enforcers, the militia created to police the mutant population in Bishop's future, and the series of the same name (usually abbreviated XSE).
- X-Treme Sanctions Executive, a United Nations-backed organisation led by Storm in the present day.
