= Yako (name) =

Yako may refer to the following people:

Given name

- Yako Chan, Taiwanese singer and actress
- Yako Fujigasaki, Japanese professional wrestler

Surname

- Daisuke Yako (born 1988), Japanese volleyball player
- St John Page Yako (1901–1977) Xhosa poet
