= Nouna Airport =

Airport in Kossi, Burkina Faso

- IATA: XNU; ICAO: DFON

Summary
- Airport type: Public
- Serves: Nouna
- Location: Burkina Faso
- Elevation AMSL: 886 ft / 270 m
- Coordinates: 12°44′36.7″N 3°51′46.9″W

Map
- Location of Nouna Airport in Burkina Faso

Runways
Direction	Length		Surface
Direction	ft	m	Surface
09/27	4,250	1,295	Grass
- Source: Landings.com

Nouna Airport (IATA: XNU, ICAO: DFON) is a public use airport located near Nouna, Kossi, Burkina Faso.

== See also ==
- List of airports in Burkina Faso
