= Gorom Gorom Airport =

Airport in Gorom-Gorom Department, Burkina Faso

- IATA: XGG; ICAO: DFEG

Summary
- Airport type: Public
- Serves: Gorom Gorom
- Location: Burkina Faso
- Elevation AMSL: 285 m / 935 ft
- Coordinates: 14°27′19.3″N 0°13′3.7″W

Map
- Location of Gorom Gorom Airport in Burkina Faso

Runways
Direction	Length		Surface
Direction	m	ft	Surface
05/23	1,650	5,413	Grass
- Source: Landings.com, Google,

Gorom Gorom Airport (IATA: XGG, ICAO: DFEG) is a public-use airport located two kilometres (one nautical mile) east-northeast of Gorom Gorom, Oudalan, Burkina Faso.

== See also ==
- List of airports in Burkina Faso
