= Dano Airport =

Airport in Ioba, Burkina Faso

- IATA: none; ICAO: DFOA

Summary
- Airport type: Public
- Serves: Dano
- Location: Burkina Faso
- Elevation AMSL: 935 ft / 285 m
- Coordinates: 11°8′17.0″N 3°4′27.5″W

Map
- Location of Dano Airport in Burkina Faso

Runways
Direction	Length		Surface
Direction	ft	m	Surface
06/24	1,800	549	Grass
- Source: Landings.com

Dano Airport (ICAO: DFOA) is a public use airport located near Dano, Ioba, Burkina Faso.

== See also ==
- List of airports in Burkina Faso
