= Boulsa Airport =

Airport in Namentenga, Burkina Faso

- IATA: XBO; ICAO: DFEA

Summary
- Airport type: Public
- Serves: Boulsa
- Location: Burkina Faso
- Elevation AMSL: 984 ft / 300 m
- Coordinates: 12°39′28.7″N 0°34′7.6″W

Map
- Location of Boulsa Airport in Burkina Faso

Runways
Direction	Length		Surface
Direction	ft	m	Surface
05/23	1,530	466	Dirt
- Source: Landings.com

Boulsa Airport (IATA: XBO, ICAO: DFEA) is a public use airport located near Boulsa, Namentenga, Burkina Faso.

== See also ==
- List of airports in Burkina Faso
