= Gaoua Airport =

Airport in Poni, Burkina Faso

- IATA: XGA; ICAO: DFOG

Summary
- Airport type: Public
- Serves: Gaoua
- Location: Burkina Faso
- Elevation AMSL: 335 m / 1,099 ft
- Coordinates: 10°22′58.8″N 3°9′51.8″W

Map
- Location of Gaoua Airport in Burkina Faso

Runways
Direction	Length		Surface
Direction	m	ft	Surface
06/24	1,494	4,902	Grass
- Source: Landings.com, Google, STV

Gaoua Airport (IATA: XGA, ICAO: DFOG) is a public use airport located near Gaoua, Poni, Burkina Faso.

== See also ==
- List of airports in Burkina Faso
