= Aribinda Airport =

Airport in Soum, Burkina Faso

- IATA: XAR; ICAO: DFOY

Summary
- Serves: Aribinda, Soum Province, Sahel Region, Burkina Faso
- Location: Burkina Faso
- Elevation AMSL: 342 m / 1,122 ft
- Coordinates: 14°13′00″N 00°53′00″W

Maps
- Sahel Region in Burkina Faso

- Location of the airport in Burkina Faso

Runways
Direction	Length		Surface
Direction	m	ft	Surface
08/26	625	2,051	Basalt

Aribinda Airport (IATA: XAR, ICAO: DFOY) is an airport serving the village of Aribinda in the Soum Province, part of the Sahel Region of Burkina Faso.

The airport is likely long abandoned. However, a listing for the airfield still appears in the official ASECNA Aeronautical Information Publication for Burkina Faso, quoting coordinates N14 13.0 W000 53.0. Furthermore, the airport still has a valid 3-letter code allocated by IATA, though a search of the ICAO database reveals no 4-letter ICAO location indicator code.
