= Sebba Airport =

Airport in Yagha, Burkina Faso

- IATA: XSE; ICAO: DFES

Summary
- Serves: Sebba, Yagha Province, Sahel Region, Burkina Faso
- Location: Burkina Faso
- Elevation AMSL: 270 m / 886 ft
- Coordinates: 13°27′24″N 0°30′10″E

Maps
- Sahel Region in Burkina Faso

- Location of the airport in Burkina Faso

Runways
Direction	Length		Surface
Direction	ft	m	Surface
05/23	2,000	610	Grass
- Source: Bing Landings.com, Google, STV

Sebba Airport (IATA: XSE, ICAO: DFES) is an airport serving the village of Sebba in the Yagha Province, part of the Sahel Region of Burkina Faso.

The runway is unmarked and its length is estimated.

== See also ==
- List of airports in Burkina Faso
