= Kaya Airport =

Airport in Sanmatenga, Burkina Faso

- IATA: XKY; ICAO: DFCA

Summary
- Airport type: Public
- Serves: Kaya
- Location: Burkina Faso
- Elevation AMSL: 984 ft / 300 m
- Coordinates: 13°4′38.5″N 1°6′1.0″W

Map
- Location of Kaya Airport in Burkina Faso

Runways
Direction	Length		Surface
Direction	ft	m	Surface
08/26	1,960	597	Grass
- Source: Landings.com

Kaya Airport (IATA: XKY, ICAO: DFCA) is a public use airport located near Kaya, Sanmatenga, Burkina Faso.

== See also ==
- List of airports in Burkina Faso
