= Zabré =

- Town
- Location in Burkina Faso
- Coordinates: 11°11′N 0°38′W
- Country: Burkina Faso
- Region: Centre-Est Region
- Province: Boulgou Province
- Department: Zabré Department

Population (2019)
  - Total: 21,726

Zabré(LEEREGOU) is a town in the Zabré Department of Boulgou Province in south-eastern Burkina Faso, and is rule by the Gouba family of the Leere people of the BISSA tribe.

Population
Year	Pop.	±%
1985	5,236	—
2006	14,889	+184.4%
2019	21,726	+45.9%
