= Leo Airport =

Airport in Sissili, Burkina Faso

- IATA: XLU; ICAO: DFCL

Summary
- Airport type: Public
- Serves: Leo
- Location: Burkina Faso
- Elevation AMSL: 1,181 ft / 360 m
- Coordinates: 11°6′19.5″N 2°6′5.8″W

Map
- Location of Leo Airport in Burkina Faso

Runways
Direction	Length		Surface
Direction	ft	m	Surface
08/26	1,380	421	Grass
- Source: Landings.com

Leo Airport (IATA: XLU, ICAO: DFCL) is a public use airport located near Leo, Sissili, Burkina Faso.

== See also ==
- List of airports in Burkina Faso
