= Kaya, Burkina Faso =

Kaya
- City
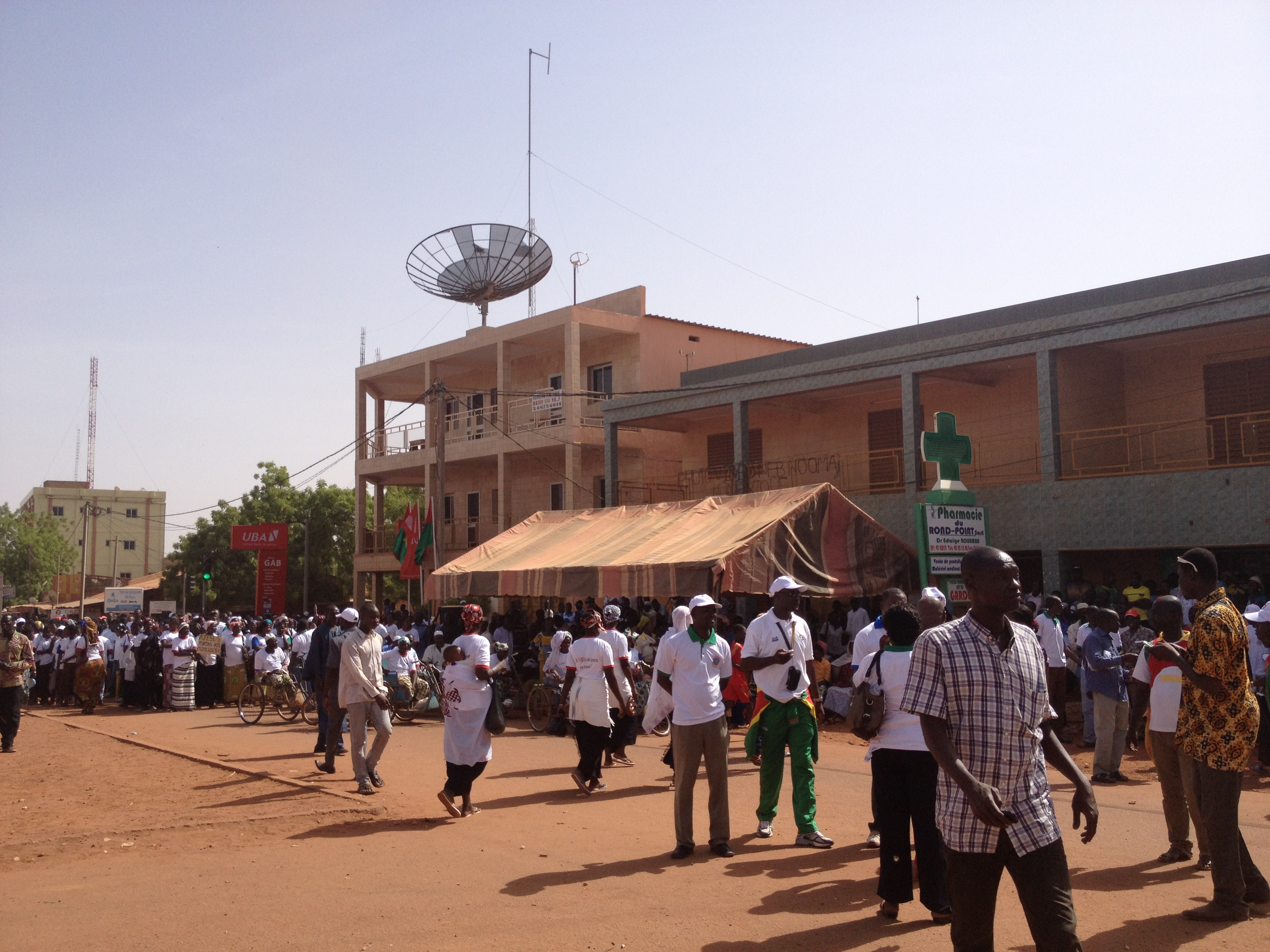

- Location within Burkina Faso
- Coordinates: 13°05′00″N 01°05′00″W
- Country: Burkina Faso
- Region: Centre-Nord
- Province: Sanmatenga

Government
  - Mayor: Boukaré Ouedraogo
- Elevation: 353 m (1,158 ft)

Population (2019)
  - Total: 121,970
- Time zone: UTC+0 (GMT)

Kaya is the fifth largest city in Burkina Faso, lying northeast of Ouagadougou, to which it is connected by railway. It is a centre for weaving and tanning.

Kaya is the capital of Sanmatenga Province. It is located 100 kilometres (62 mi) from Ouagadougou, the capital of Burkina Faso.

== Demographics ==
Kaya has a population of 121,970 (2019 census).

Population growth:

Year	Inhabitants
1985 (census)	29.359
1996 (census)	33.958
2006 (census)	51,778

== Infrastructure ==
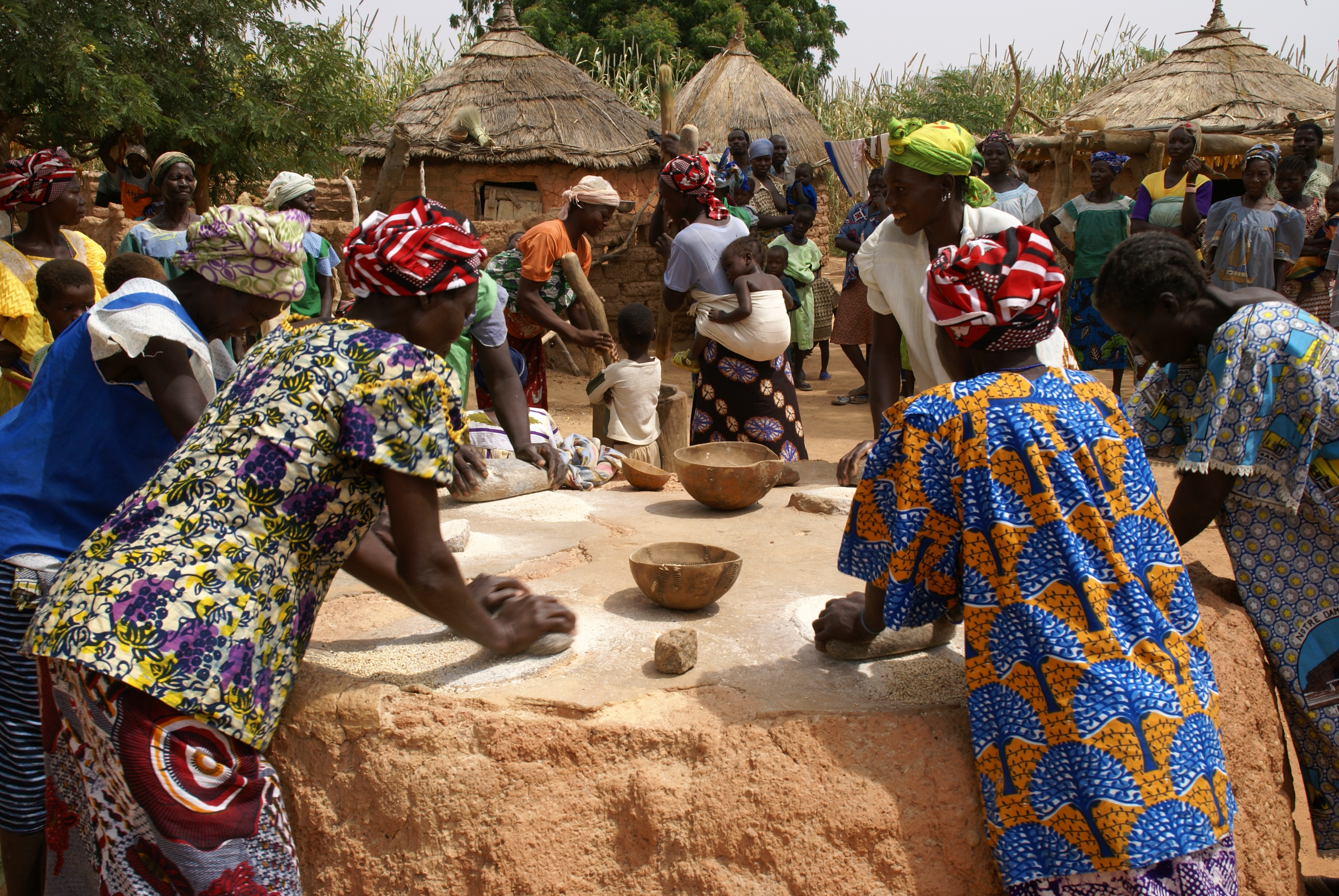
Women in Kaya kneading millet to prepare food. 2007

Kaya Airport is a public airport in Kaya. As of 2014 it did not have any scheduled commercial flights.

In 1988 Kaya was connected by railway to Ouagadougou but, as of 2014, there were no passenger services available.

Kaya is a road junction for the N3 and N15 national highways that link the city with Dori, Ouagadougou and Pouytenga, Boulsa, Kongoussi and Ouahigouya, respectively.

== Education ==
- Technical college for girls
- Secondary school

== Climate ==
Köppen-Geiger climate classification system classifies its climate as hot semi-arid (BSh).

Climate data for Kaya
Month	Jan	Feb	Mar	Apr	May	Jun	Jul	Aug	Sep	Oct	Nov	Dec	Year
Mean daily maximum °C (°F)	32 (90)	35.3 (95.5)	37.9 (100.2)	39.1 (102.4)	37.8 (100.0)	35.1 (95.2)	32.2 (90.0)	30.8 (87.4)	32.1 (89.8)	36.1 (97.0)	35.3 (95.5)	32.5 (90.5)	34.7 (94.5)
Daily mean °C (°F)	24.3 (75.7)	27.2 (81.0)	30.3 (86.5)	32.2 (90.0)	31.4 (88.5)	29 (84)	27.1 (80.8)	26.1 (79.0)	26.9 (80.4)	29.4 (84.9)	27.6 (81.7)	24.8 (76.6)	28.0 (82.4)
Mean daily minimum °C (°F)	16.6 (61.9)	19.2 (66.6)	22.7 (72.9)	25.3 (77.5)	25 (77)	23 (73)	22 (72)	21.4 (70.5)	21.8 (71.2)	22.8 (73.0)	19.9 (67.8)	17.2 (63.0)	21.4 (70.5)
Average precipitation mm (inches)	0 (0)	0 (0)	4 (0.2)	13 (0.5)	41 (1.6)	98 (3.9)	153 (6.0)	207 (8.1)	111 (4.4)	21 (0.8)	0 (0)	0 (0)	648 (25.5)
Source: Climate-Data.org, altitude: 331m

== Sister cities ==
- Herzogenaurach, Germany
- Châtellerault, France
- Savannah, Georgia, United States

== See also ==
- List of cities in Burkina Faso
