= Bogande Airport =

Airport in Gnagna, Burkina Faso

Bogandé Airport
- IATA: XBG; ICAO: DFEB

Summary
- Airport type: Public
- Serves: Bogandé
- Location: Burkina Faso
- Elevation AMSL: 984 ft / 300 m
- Coordinates: 12°58′53.165″N 000°09′45.407″W

Map
- Location of Bogandé Airport in Burkina Faso

Runways
Direction	Length		Surface
Direction	ft	m	Surface
11/29	2,625	800	Dirt
- Source: Burkina Faso AIP

Bogandé Airport (IATA: XBG, ICAO: DFEB) is a public use airport located near Bogandé, Gnagna, Burkina Faso.

The airport is listed as DFEB in the official ASECNA Aernautical Information Publication for Burkino Faso but a search of the ICAO database does not confirm its 4-letter ICAO location indicator code.

== See also ==
- List of airports in Burkina Faso
