= Ouahigouya Airport =

Airport in Yatenga, Burkina Faso

- IATA: OUG; ICAO: DFCC

Summary
- Airport type: Public
- Serves: Ouahigouya
- Location: Burkina Faso
- Elevation AMSL: 1,102 ft / 336 m
- Coordinates: 13°33′46.6″N 2°25′23.3″W

Map
- Location of Ouahigouya Airport in Burkina Faso

Runways
Direction	Length		Surface
Direction	ft	m	Surface
09/27	5,550	1,692	Grass
- Source: Landings.com

Ouahigouya Airport (IATA: OUG, ICAO: DFCC) is a former public use airport located near Ouahigouya, Yatenga, Burkina Faso.

== See also ==
- List of airports in Burkina Faso
