= Bogandé =

- Town
- Location within Burkina Faso, West Africa
- Coordinates: 12°58′N 0°09′W
- Country: Burkina Faso
- Region: Est Region
- Province: Gnagna Province
- Department: Bogandé Department

Population (2019)
  - Total: 21,443
- Time zone: UTC+0 (GMT)
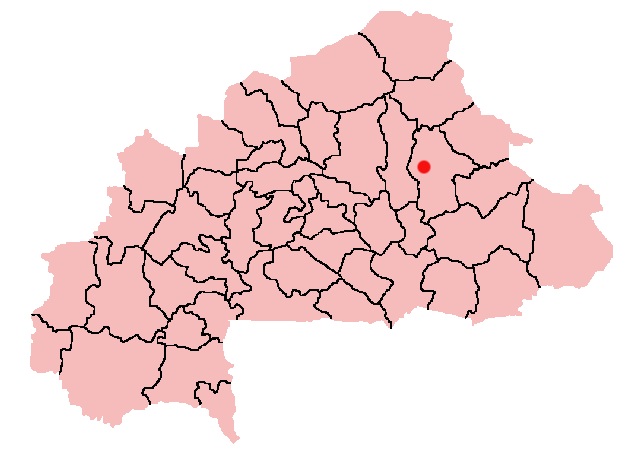
- Location of Bogandé in Burkina Faso

Bogandé is the capital of Gnagna Province in Burkina Faso.

== Population ==
Population
Year	Pop.	±%
1985	5,333	—
2006	14,929	+179.9%
2019	21,443	+43.6%

== Climate ==
Climate data for Bogande (1991–2020)
Month	Jan	Feb	Mar	Apr	May	Jun	Jul	Aug	Sep	Oct	Nov	Dec	Year
Record high °C (°F)	40.0 (104.0)	42.5 (108.5)	43.3 (109.9)	44.5 (112.1)	44.4 (111.9)	41.7 (107.1)	39.9 (103.8)	38.8 (101.8)	39.2 (102.6)	40.9 (105.6)	39.5 (103.1)	39.1 (102.4)	44.5 (112.1)
Mean daily maximum °C (°F)	32.4 (90.3)	35.6 (96.1)	38.9 (102.0)	40.3 (104.5)	38.9 (102.0)	35.9 (96.6)	32.9 (91.2)	31.3 (88.3)	33.0 (91.4)	36.4 (97.5)	36.5 (97.7)	33.7 (92.7)	35.5 (95.9)
Daily mean °C (°F)	24.7 (76.5)	27.9 (82.2)	31.7 (89.1)	33.9 (93.0)	33.1 (91.6)	30.7 (87.3)	28.3 (82.9)	27.0 (80.6)	27.9 (82.2)	29.8 (85.6)	28.4 (83.1)	25.6 (78.1)	29.1 (84.4)
Mean daily minimum °C (°F)	16.9 (62.4)	19.9 (67.8)	24.2 (75.6)	27.5 (81.5)	27.8 (82.0)	25.8 (78.4)	24.0 (75.2)	23.3 (73.9)	23.4 (74.1)	23.9 (75.0)	20.2 (68.4)	17.4 (63.3)	22.9 (73.2)
Record low °C (°F)	10.2 (50.4)	13.6 (56.5)	16.7 (62.1)	19.5 (67.1)	19.6 (67.3)	18.0 (64.4)	18.4 (65.1)	19.3 (66.7)	18.0 (64.4)	17.6 (63.7)	14.0 (57.2)	9.5 (49.1)	9.5 (49.1)
Average precipitation mm (inches)	0.0 (0.0)	0.1 (0.00)	1.3 (0.05)	8.0 (0.31)	38.2 (1.50)	95.3 (3.75)	173.3 (6.82)	196.6 (7.74)	105.7 (4.16)	26.9 (1.06)	0.0 (0.0)	0.0 (0.0)	645.4 (25.41)
Average precipitation days (≥ 1.0 mm)	0.0	0.0	0.1	1.3	4.0	6.3	10.0	12.0	8.2	2.9	0.0	0.0	44.8
Mean monthly sunshine hours	291.2	262.3	268.3	254.6	268.1	253.4	240.7	222.1	241.8	284.7	297.2	302.4	3,186.8
Source: NOAA

== Transport ==
Bogandé Airport (IATA: XBG, ICAO: DFEB) is a public use airport located near Bogandé, Gnagna, Burkina Faso.
