= Gorom-Gorom =

Town in Sahel Region, Burkina Faso

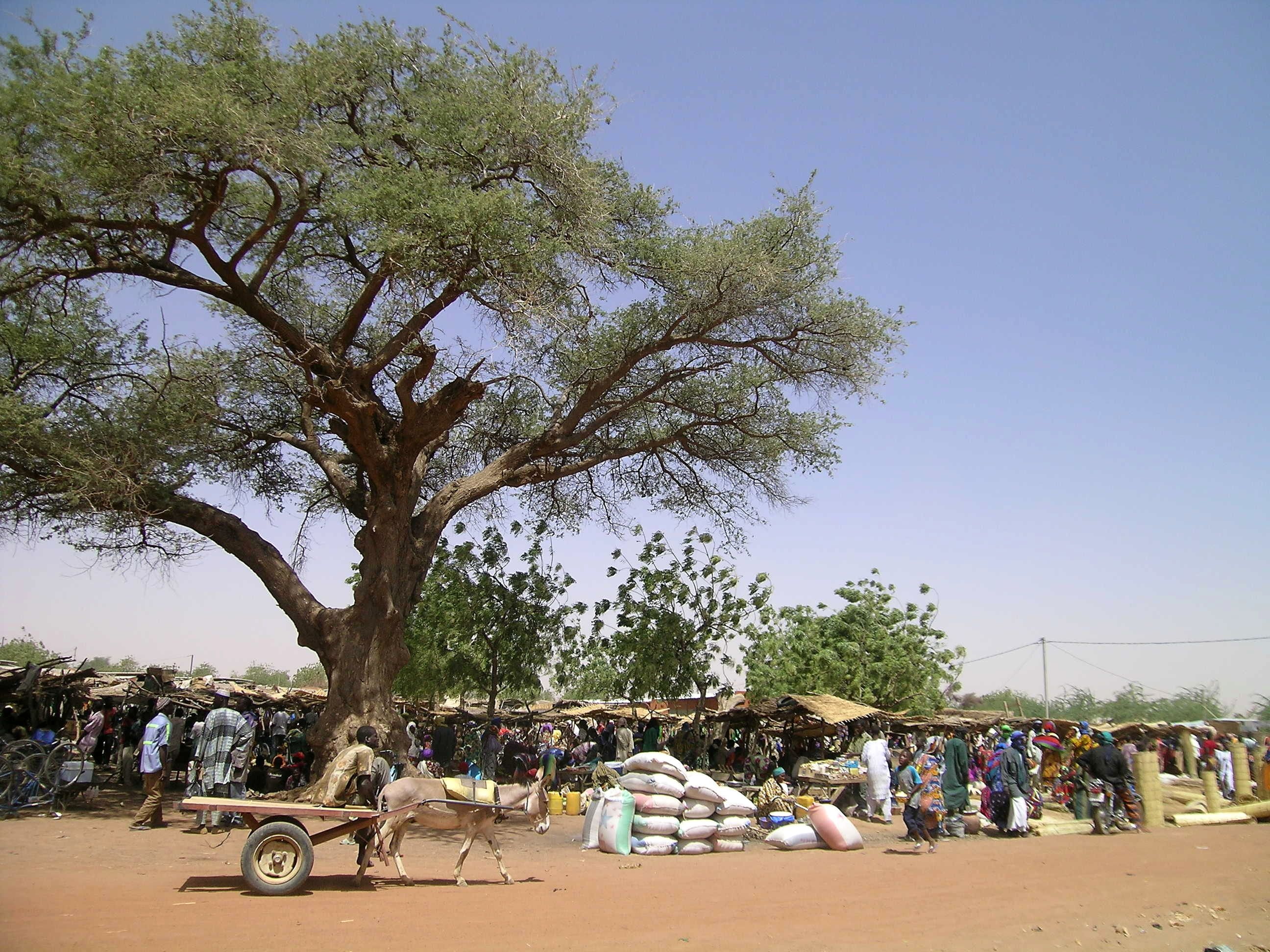
- The Gorom-Gorom market

- Location within Burkina Faso
- Coordinates: 14°27′N 0°14′W
- Country: Burkina Faso
- Region: Sahel Region
- Province: Oudalan Province
- Department: Gorom-Gorom Department

Population (2019)
  - Total: 9,752
- Time zone: UTC+0 (GMT)

Gorom-Gorom is a town in northern Burkina Faso. It is the capital of the Gorom-Gorom Department and Oudalan Province, in the Sahel Region. Gorom-Gorom is known for its weekly market, which is the largest in the country and attracts merchants from across the region.

The 2019 census recorded 9,752 people in Gorom-Gorom, many of whom were nomads from the Tuareg, Fulani, or Songhai ethnic groups. The town and area around it also hosts thousands of internally displaced persons who fled the violence of the Islamist insurgency in Burkina Faso.

== Etymology ==
The name Gorom-Gorom translates to "you sit down, [and] we will sit down", reminiscent of its role as an important crossroads in the Sahel.

== Demographics ==
The 2019 census recorded 9,752 residents in Gorom-Gorom. The population of is mostly nomadic and consists mainly of Tuareg, Fulani, and Songhai.

Additionally, 20,000 internally displaced persons (IDPs) reside in and around Gorom-Gorom as a consequence of the ongoing Islamist insurgency in Burkina Faso. Both the local populace and IDPs rely on non-governmental organisations such as Médecins Sans Frontières (Doctors Without Borders) for access to clean drinking water and food aid.

== Economy ==
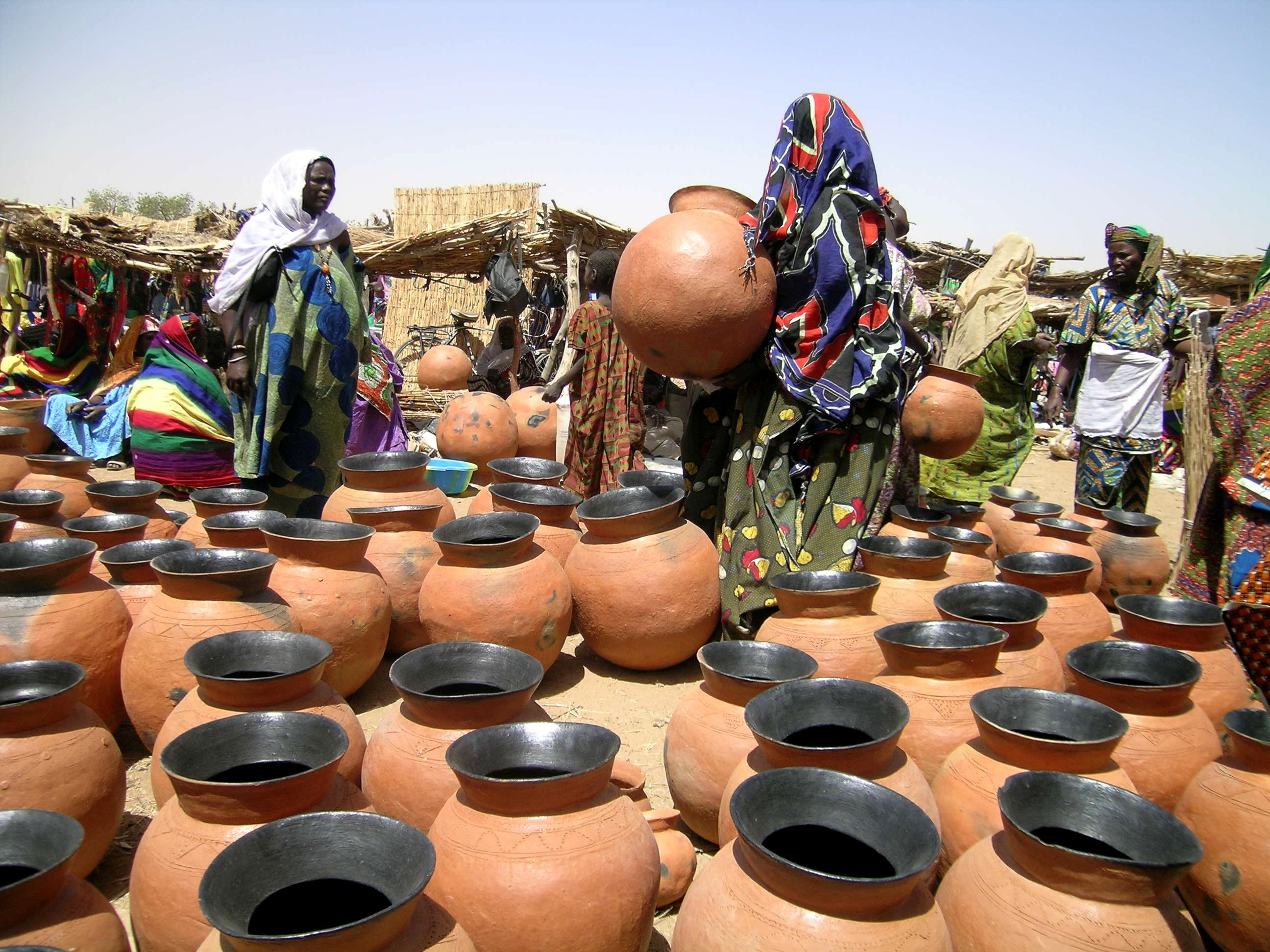
Songhai pottery being sold at the Gorom-Gorom market

The Gorom-Gorom market is the largest in Burkina Faso. Every week, merchants and customers from the various ethnic groups of the Sahara gather in the town to buy and sell goods, chiefly handicrafts and local foods.

== Transportation ==
Gorom-Gorom has a small airport located approximately 1.9 kilometres (1.2 mi) northeast of the town. A number of buses, bush taxis, and minibuses can be taken to reach Gorom-Gorom from the national capital Ouagadougou, but the two settlements are 290 kilometres (180 mi) apart from each other.
