= Provinces of Burkina Faso =

The regions of Burkina Faso are divided into 45 administrative provinces. These 45 provinces are currently sub-divided into 351 departments or communes.

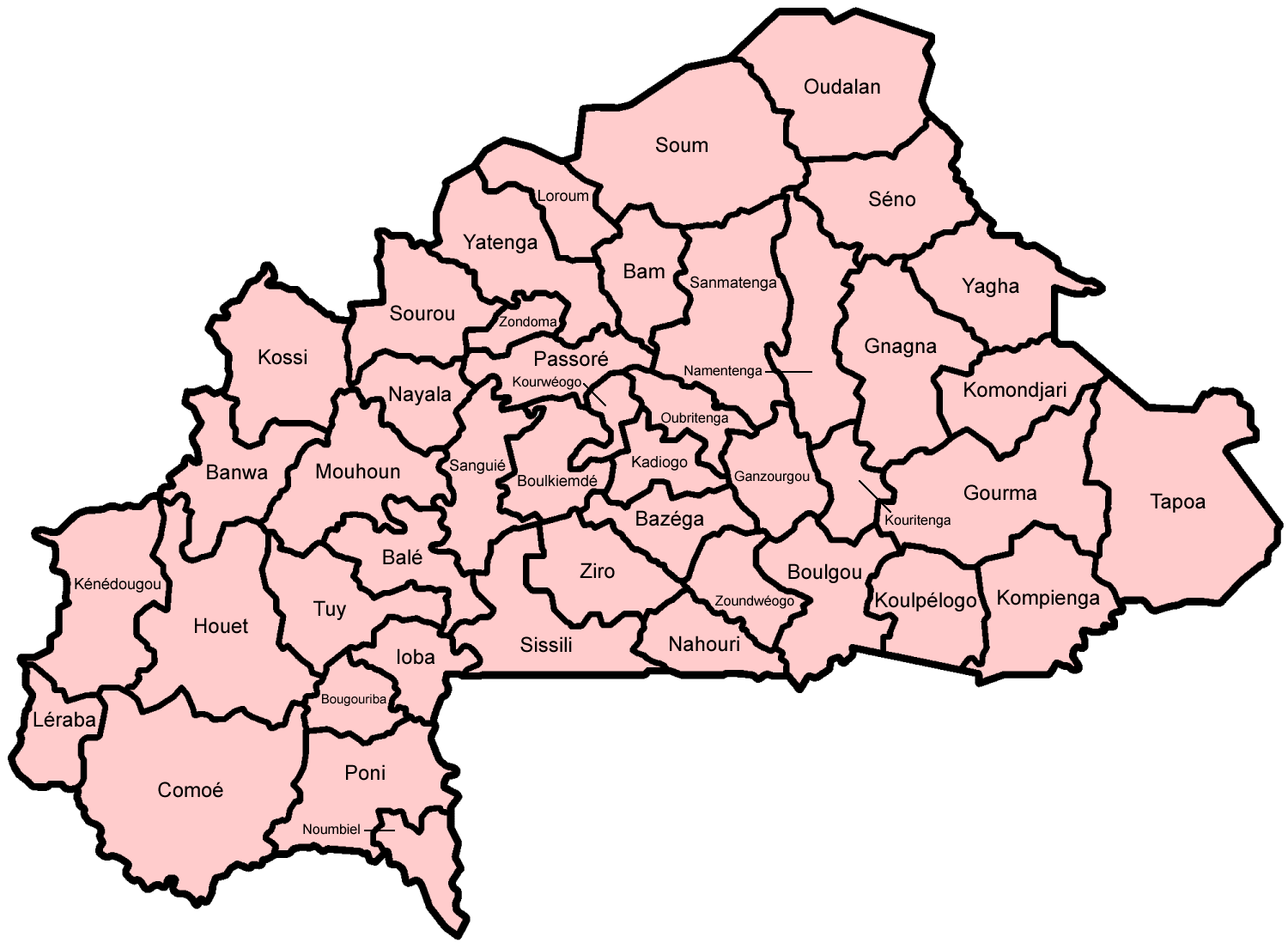
Provinces of Burkina Faso with names

== List of provinces by region ==
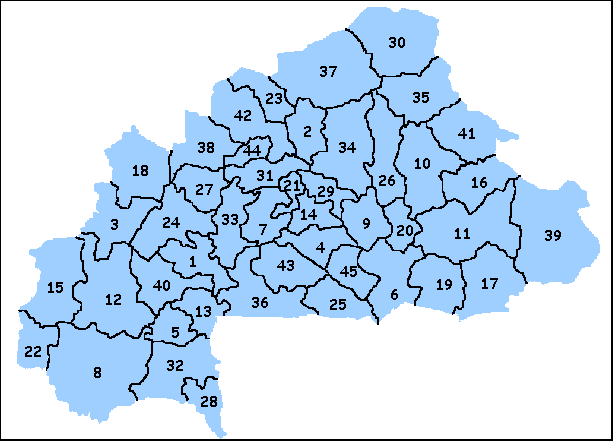
Provinces of Burkina Faso by number

Here is a list of the provinces, with their capitals in parentheses:

=== Centrale Burkina Faso ===
==== Centre Region ====
- Kadiogo (Ouagadougou) (#14 in map)

==== Centre-Nord Region ====
- Bam (Kongoussi) (#2 in map)
- Namentenga (Boulsa) (#26 in map)
- Sanmatenga (Kaya) (#34 in map)

==== Centre-Sud Region ====
- Bazèga (Kombissiri) (#4 in map)
- Nahouri (Pô) (#25 in map)
- Zoundwéogo (Manga) (#45 in map)

==== Plateau-Central Region ====
- Ganzourgou (Zorgho) (#9 in map)
- Kourwéogo (Boussé) (#21 in map)
- Oubritenga (Ziniaré) (#29 in map)

=== Est Burkina Faso ===
==== Centre-Est Region ====
- Boulgou (Tenkodogo) (#6 in map)
- Koulpélogo (Ouargaye) (#19 in map)
- Kouritenga (Koupéla) (#20 in map)

==== Est Region ====
- Gnagna (Bogandé) (#10 in map)
- Gourma (Fada N'gourma) (#11 in map)
- Komondjari (Gayéri) (#16 in map)
- Kompienga (Pama) (#17 in map)
- Tapoa (Diapaga) (#39 in map)

=== Nord Burkina Faso ===
==== Nord Region ====
- Loroum (Titao) (#23 in map)
- Passoré (Yako) (#31 in map)
- Yatenga (Ouahigouya) (#42 in map)
- Zondoma (Gourcy) (#44 in map)

==== Sahel Region ====
- Oudalan (Gorom-Gorom) (#30 in map)
- Séno (Dori) (#35 in map)
- Soum (Djibo) (#37 in map)
- Yagha (Sebba) (#41 in map)

=== Sud Burkina Faso ===
==== Cascades Region ====
- Komoé (Banfora) (#8 in map)
- Léraba (Sindou) (#22 in map)

==== Hauts-Bassins Region ====
- Houet (Bobo-Dioulasso) (#12 in map)
- Kénédougou (Orodara) (#15 in map)
- Tuy (Houndé) (#40 in map)

==== Sud-Ouest Region ====
- Bougouriba (Diébougou) (#5 in map)
- Ioba (Dano) (#13 in map)
- Noumbiel (Batié) (#28 in map)
- Poni (Gaoua) (#32 in map)

=== Ouest Burkina Faso ===
==== Boucle du Mouhoun Region ====
- Balé (Boromo) (#1 in map)
- Banwa (Solenzo) (#3 in map)
- Kossi (Nouna) (#18 in map)
- Mouhoun (Dédougou) (#24 in map)
- Nayala (Toma) (#27 in map)
- Sourou (Tougan) (#38 in map)

==== Centre-Ouest Region ====
- Boulkiemdé (Koudougou) (#7 in map)
- Sanguié (Réo) (#33 in map)
- Sissili (Léo) (#36 in map)
- Ziro (Sapouy) (#43 in map)

== Populations of the 45 Provinces ==
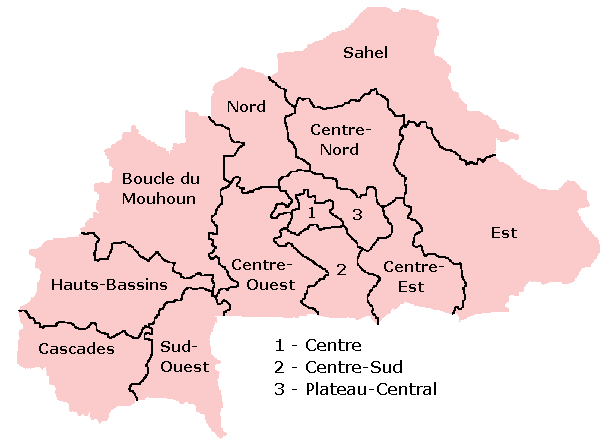
A clickable map of Burkina Faso exhibiting its 13 administrative regions.

Province	Population at 2006 Census	Population at 2019 Census
Balé	213,423	297,367
Bam	275,191	473,955
Banwa	269,375	345,749
Bazèga	238,425	280,793
Bougouriba	101,479	153,606
Boulgou	543,570	736,559
Boulkiemdé	505,206	689,184
Komoé	407,528	632,695
Ganzourgou	319,380	481,794
Gnagna	408,669	675,897
Gourma	305,936	437,242
Houet	955,451	1,509,377
Ioba	192,321	265,876
Kadiogo	1,727,390	3,032,668
Kénédougou	285,695	399,836
Komondjari	79,507	105,584
Kompienga	75,867	117,672
Kossi	278,546	355,655
Koulpélogo	258,667	361,586
Kouritenga	329,779	479,930
Kourwéogo	138,217	181,202
Léraba	124,280	179,367
Loroum	142,853	198,178
Mouhoun	297,350	391,325
Nahouri	157,071	195,608
Namentenga	328,820	512,529
Nayala	163,433	223,090
Noumbiel	70,036	98,883
Oubritenga	238,775	314,514
Oudalan	195,964	158,146
Passoré	323,222	457,781
Poni	256,931	355,665
Sanguié	297,036	391,520
Sanmatenga	598,014	885,642
Séno	264,991	404,104
Sissili	208,409	336,972
Soum	347,335	363,633
Sourou	220,622	284,947
Tapoa	342,305	605,110
Tuy	228,458	329,162
Yagha	160,152	169,024
Yatenga	553,164	824,994
Ziro	175,915	241,663
Zondoma	166,557	239,955
Zoundwéogo	245,947	311,940
Totals	14,017,262	20,487,979

== See also ==
- Geography of Burkina Faso
- Regions of Burkina Faso
- Communes of Burkina Faso
- ISO 3166-2:BF
