= Kantchari =

Coordinates: 12°29′N 1°31′E

- Village
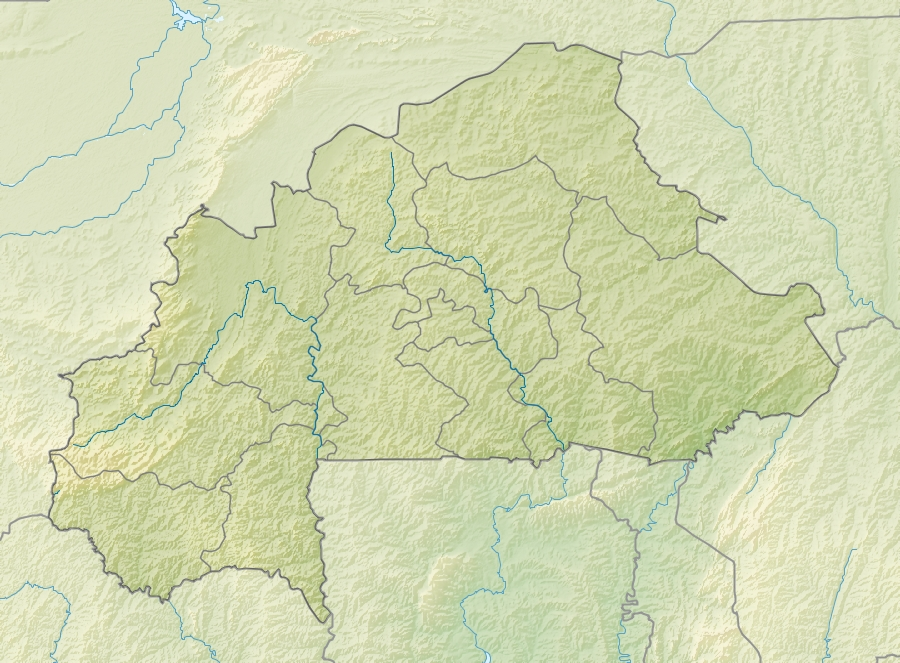
- Coordinates: 12.478966, 1.514321
- Country: Burkina Faso

Population
  - Total: 13,551
- Time zone: UTC+0

The city of Kantchari is located in eastern Burkina Faso near the border with Niger and on the main road from Ouagadougou to Niamey. Kantchari was home to 13,551 people according to the census 2019.

== Companies Founded in Kantchari ==
- Radio Station Tin Tua Kantchari
