= Dori, Burkina Faso =

Dori
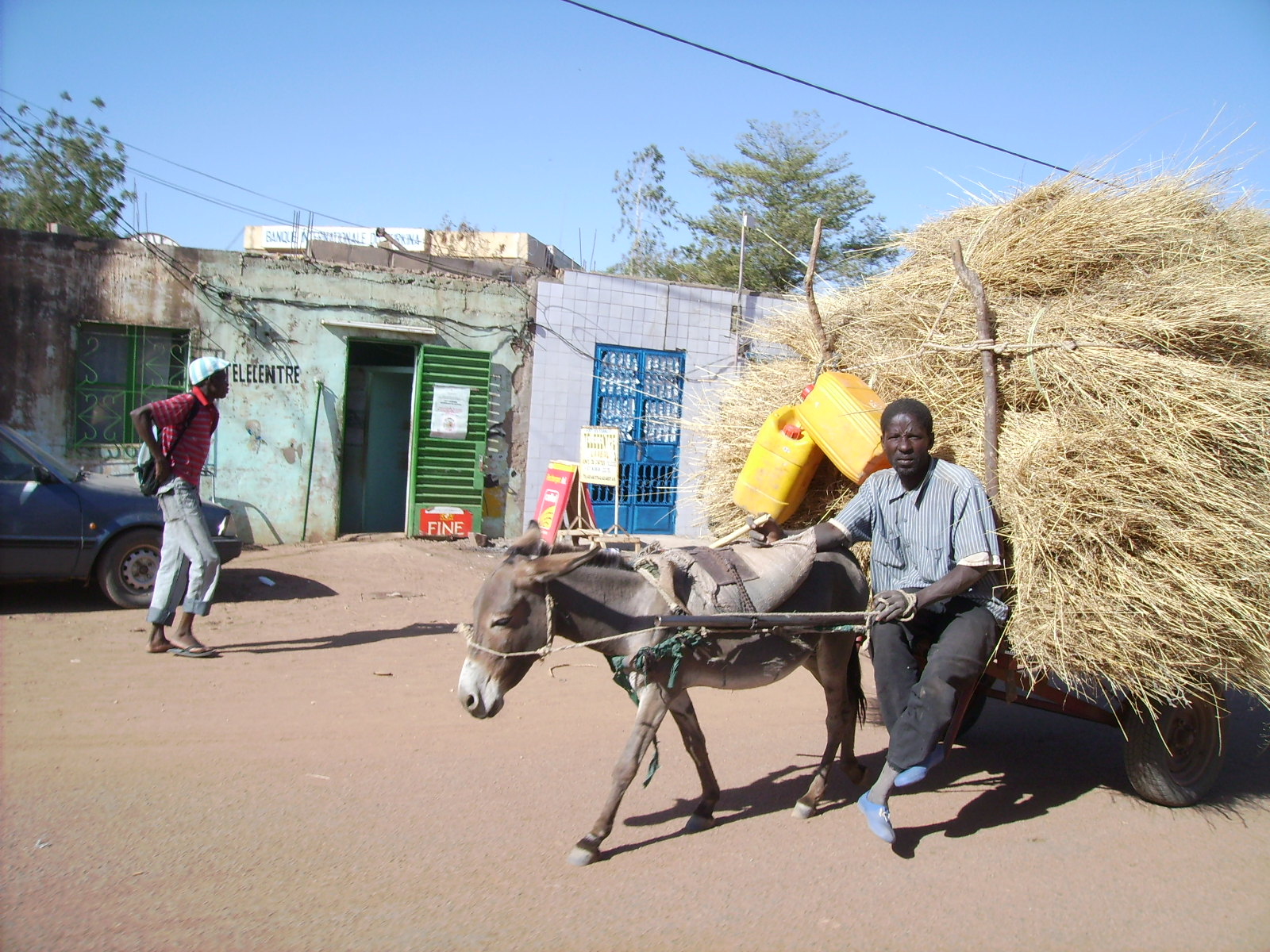
- A farmer on the streets of Dori

- Location within Burkina Faso, West Africa
- Coordinates: 14.03°N 0.03°W
- Country: Burkina Faso
- Region: Sahel Region
- Province: Séno Province
- Elevation: 286 m (938 ft)

Population (2019 census)
  - Total: 46,512
- Time zone: UTC+0 (GMT)

Dori (also known as Winde or Wendu) is a town in northeastern Burkina Faso, near the border of Niger. It is located at around 14.03°N 0.03°W. It is the capital of Sahel Region and has a population of 46,512 (2019). The main ethnic group is the Fula (Fulani) but Tuaregs and Songhai are often present. It is a town known for its herders and popular livestock markets.

Dori recorded a temperature of 47.2 °C (117.0 °F) in 1984, which is the highest temperature to have ever been recorded in Burkina Faso.

In 2020, it was reported that the Emir of Liptako lived in Dori.

== Climate ==
Dori has a semi-arid climate (Köppen climate classification BSh).

Climate data for Dori (1991–2020)
Month	Jan	Feb	Mar	Apr	May	Jun	Jul	Aug	Sep	Oct	Nov	Dec	Year
Record high °C (°F)	40.8 (105.4)	43.5 (110.3)	44.6 (112.3)	47.5 (117.5)	46.4 (115.5)	45.0 (113.0)	42.3 (108.1)	41.1 (106.0)	42.6 (108.7)	42.6 (108.7)	41.6 (106.9)	39.9 (103.8)	47.5 (117.5)
Mean daily maximum °C (°F)	32.6 (90.7)	36.0 (96.8)	40.0 (104.0)	42.4 (108.3)	41.8 (107.2)	38.8 (101.8)	35.5 (95.9)	33.7 (92.7)	35.9 (96.6)	38.9 (102.0)	37.6 (99.7)	33.9 (93.0)	37.3 (99.1)
Daily mean °C (°F)	23.6 (74.5)	26.8 (80.2)	31.0 (87.8)	34.2 (93.6)	34.6 (94.3)	32.4 (90.3)	29.7 (85.5)	28.3 (82.9)	29.6 (85.3)	31.0 (87.8)	28.0 (82.4)	24.5 (76.1)	29.5 (85.1)
Mean daily minimum °C (°F)	15.5 (59.9)	18.4 (65.1)	22.6 (72.7)	26.7 (80.1)	28.8 (83.8)	27.2 (81.0)	25.0 (77.0)	24.1 (75.4)	24.8 (76.6)	24.8 (76.6)	19.4 (66.9)	16.1 (61.0)	22.8 (73.0)
Record low °C (°F)	7.8 (46.0)	10.7 (51.3)	14.0 (57.2)	16.4 (61.5)	20.6 (69.1)	20.8 (69.4)	18.7 (65.7)	19.8 (67.6)	19.9 (67.8)	17.8 (64.0)	12.9 (55.2)	8.3 (46.9)	7.8 (46.0)
Average precipitation mm (inches)	0.3 (0.01)	0.0 (0.0)	2.6 (0.10)	4.8 (0.19)	25.7 (1.01)	68.3 (2.69)	127.9 (5.04)	186.9 (7.36)	73.8 (2.91)	16.7 (0.66)	0.0 (0.0)	0.0 (0.0)	507.0 (19.96)
Average precipitation days (≥ 1.0 mm)	0.1	0.0	0.2	0.5	3.0	5.2	8.9	10.6	6.7	2.2	0.0	0.0	37.4
Mean monthly sunshine hours	281.3	255.8	264.7	254.2	265.6	245.9	245.4	237.5	249.2	280.0	288.4	291.9	3,159.9
Source: NOAA

== Mines ==
In 2004, a proposal surfaced to link the manganese mines by rail with the seaports of Ghana.

== Notable people ==
- Roukiatou Maiga, humanitarian
- Albert Ouédraogo, former interim Burkinabé Prime Minister
- Ousmane Amirou Dicko, Emir of Liptako

== See also ==
- Railway stations in Burkina Faso

== Gallery ==
The old district of Dori with its inhabitants, 2001

The store of a Mauritanian shopkeeper. A Tuareg woman in a veil, 2001

The old district of Dori with its inhabitants, 2001

The old district of Dori with its inhabitants, 2001

A white camel on the part of the Friday market where the Peul come, 2001

Men with a zebu, goats and a cart on a dirt road along the market that is visible behind trees, 2001

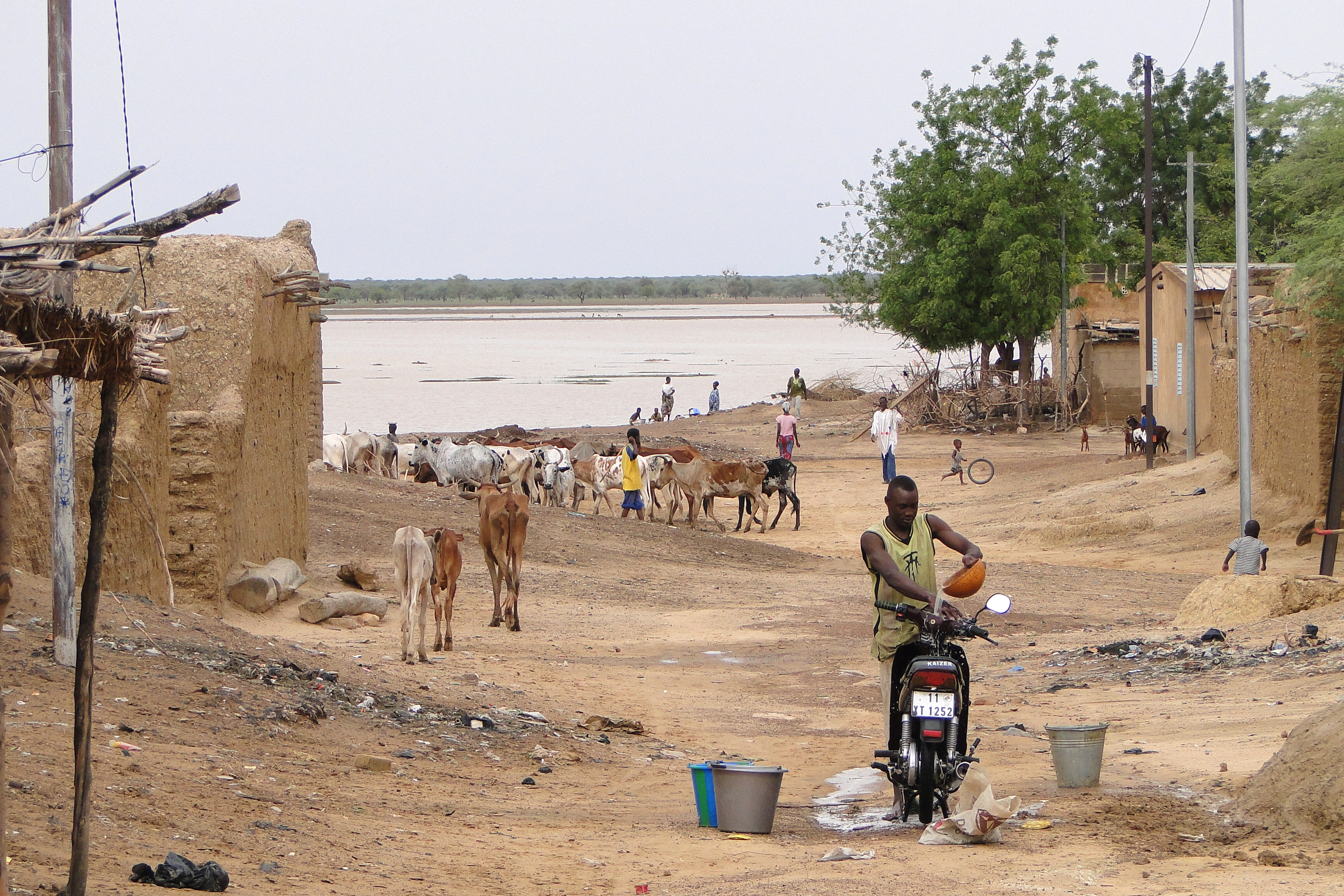
A street scene in Dori, Burkina Faso, 2010

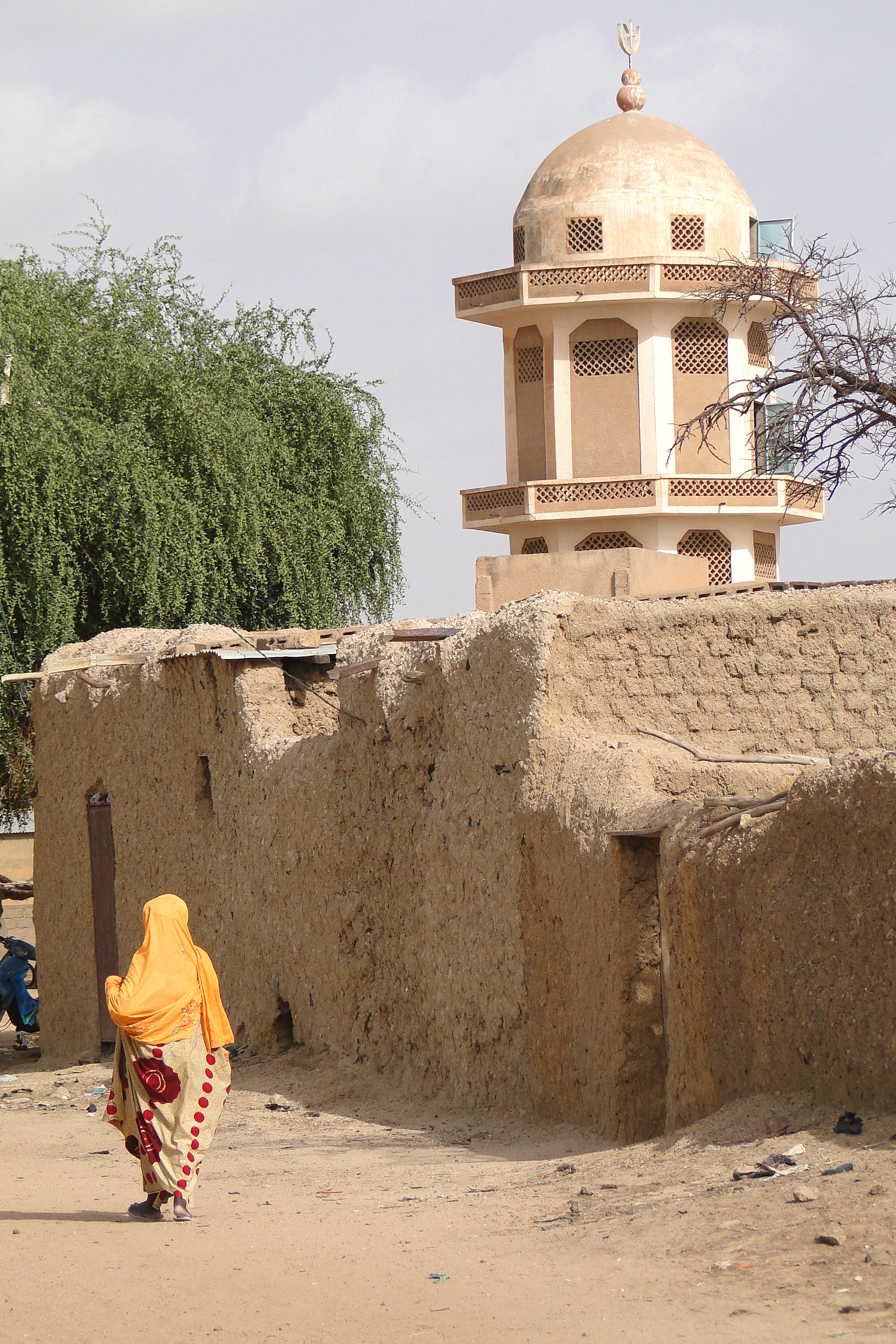
A woman is walking past the Mosque, Dori, Burkina Faso, 2010

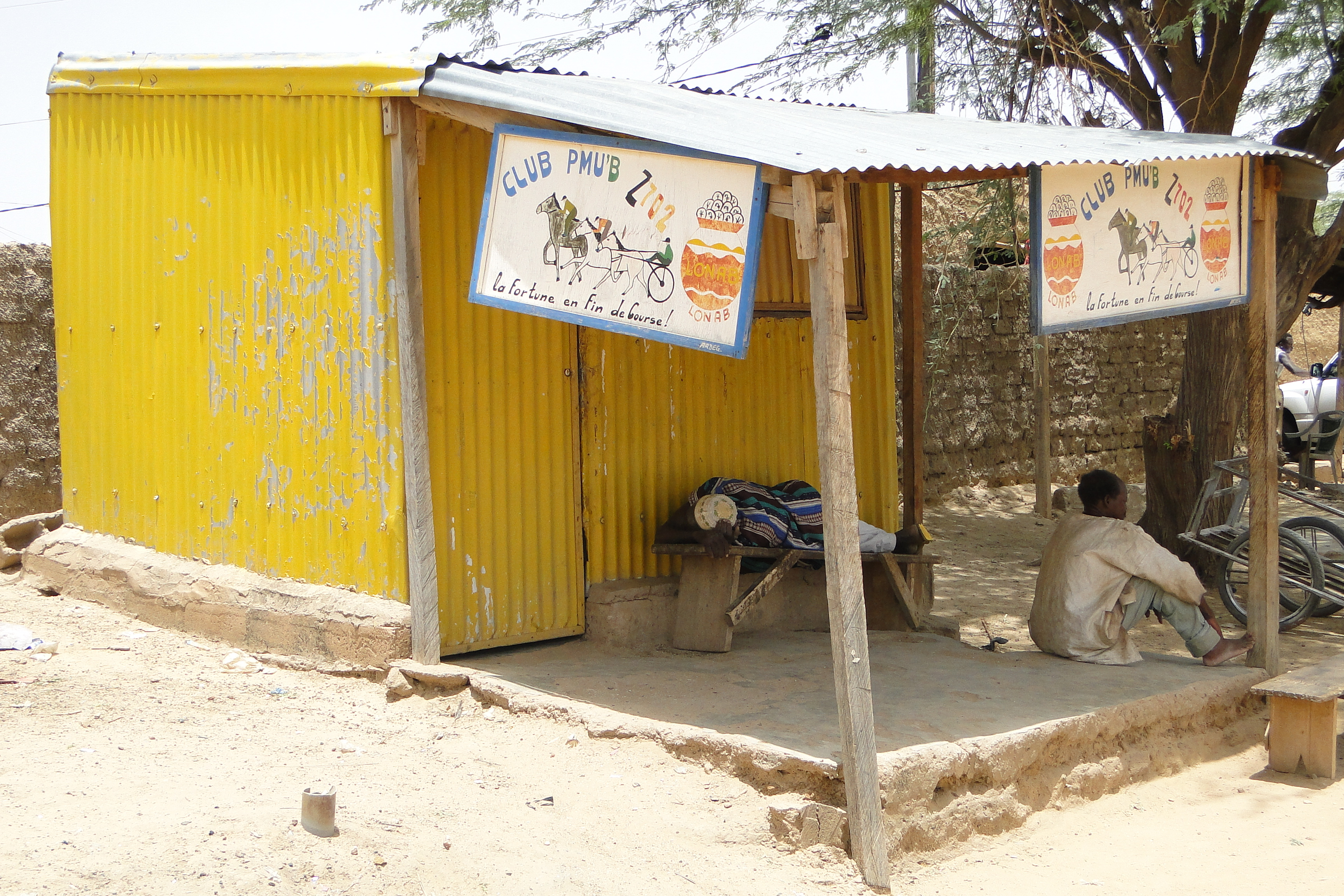
"Club PMU'B Z 702 LONAB. La fortune en Fin de Course". Images of a horse race with jockeys with betting and winning, Dori, Burkina Faso, 2010

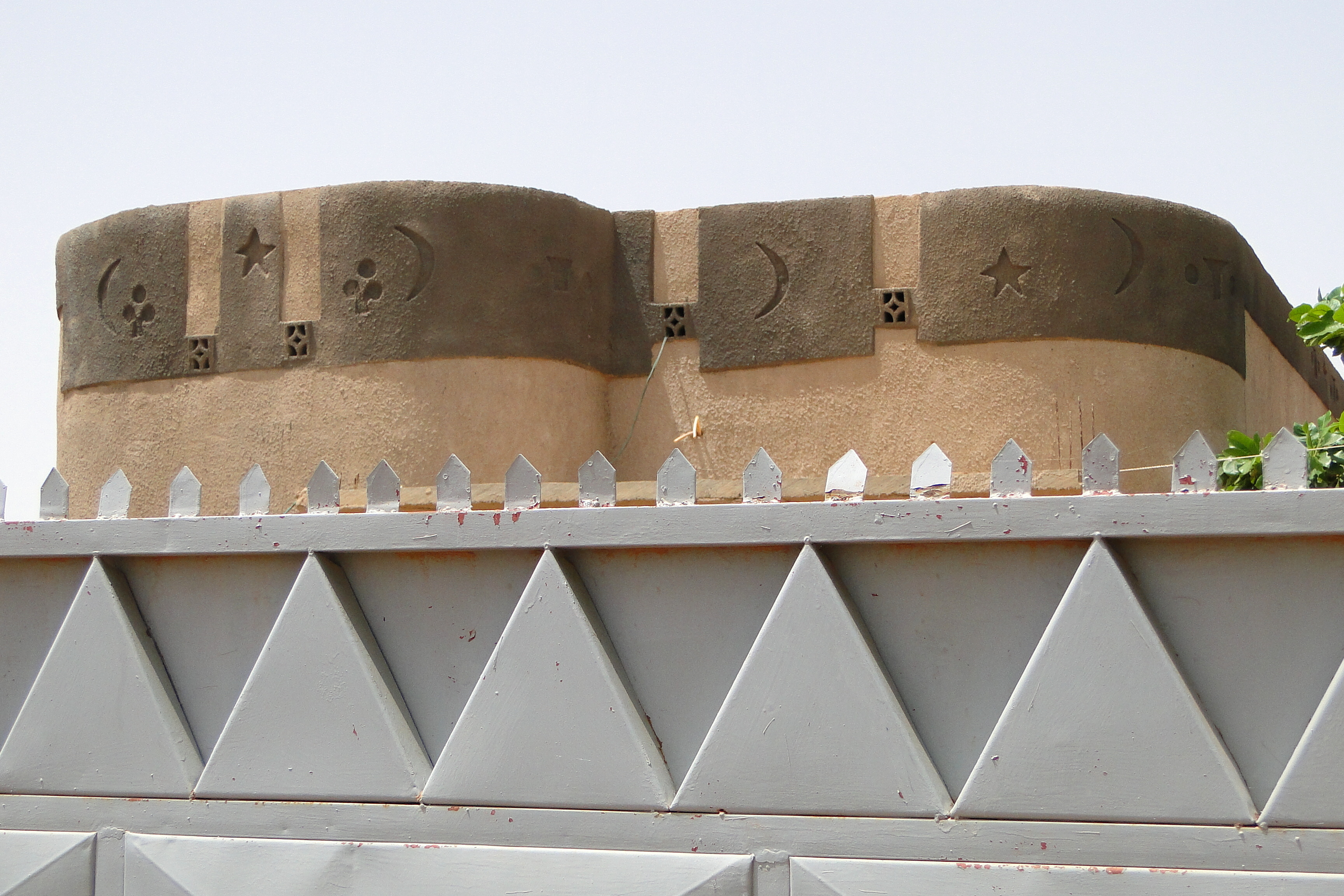
Roof with islamic motifs like mooncrescent, Dori, 2010

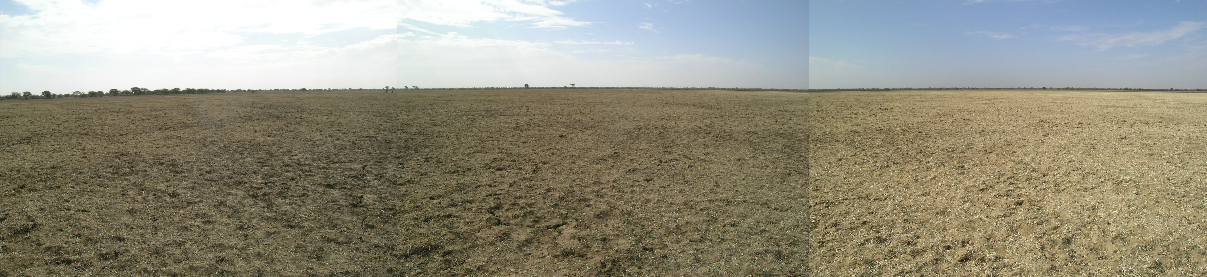
Sand desert of a dry lake near Dori, Burkina Faso, 2007

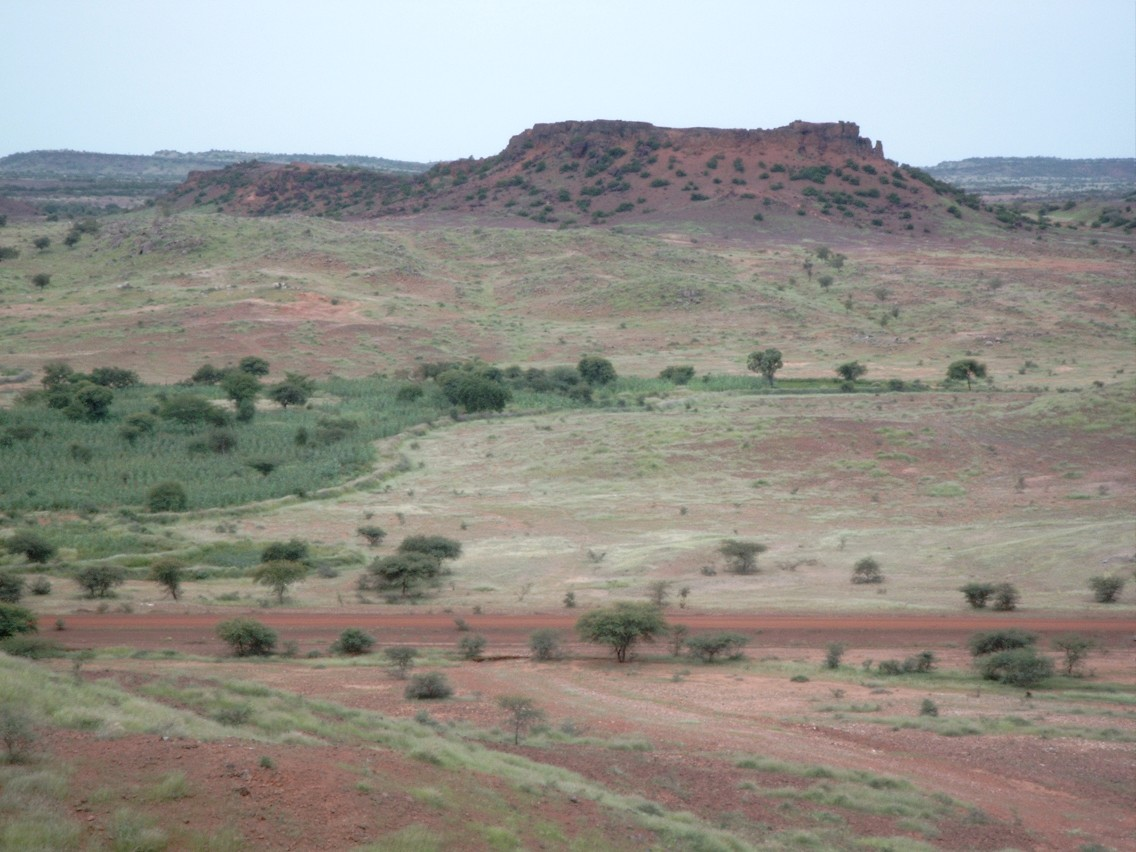
A duricrust inselberg near Dori, Burkina Faso between Dori and Yalgo, 2004
