= Liptako Region =

Region of Burkina Faso

Liptako
- Region
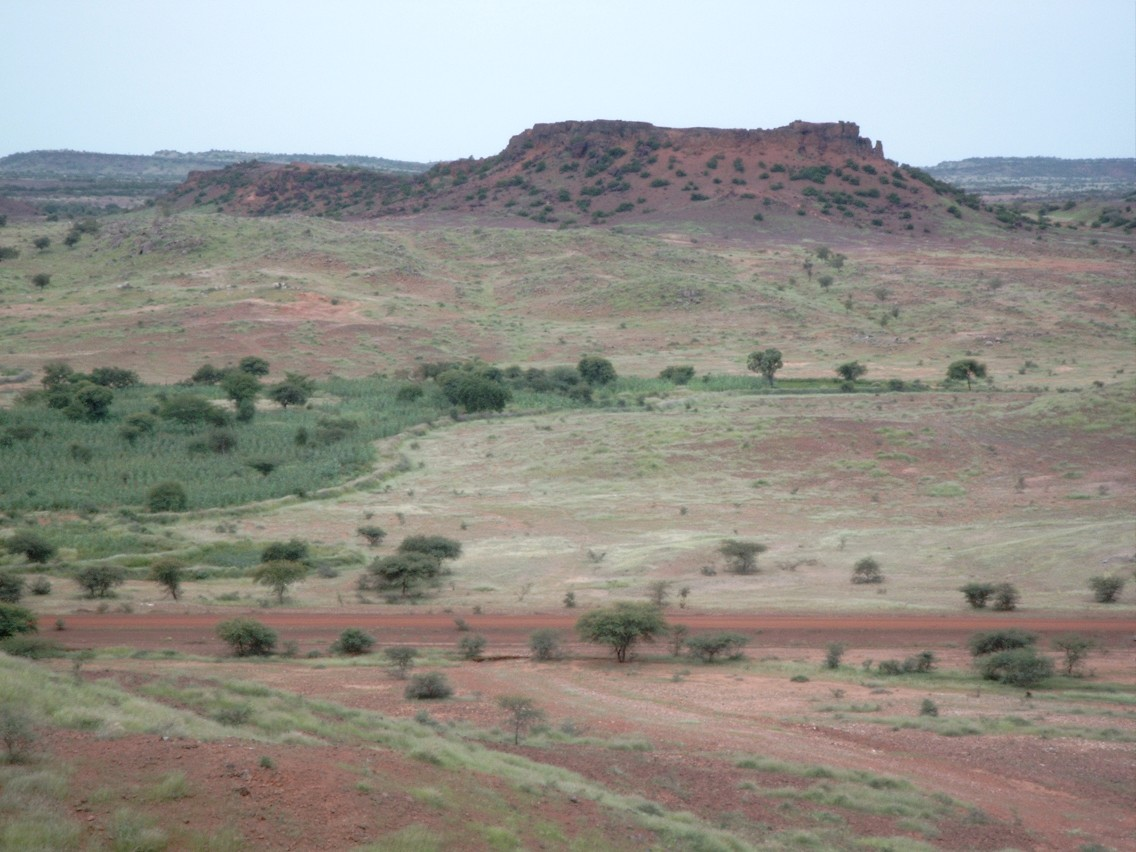

- Location in Burkina Faso
- Coordinates: 14°15′N 00°45′W
- Country: Burkina Faso
- Capital: Dori

Government
  - Governor: Salfo Kabore

Area
  - Region: 35,360 km^{2} (13,650 sq mi)

Population (2019 census)
  - Region: 1,094,907
  - Density: 30.96/km^{2} (80.20/sq mi)
  - Urban: 129,038
- Time zone: UTC+0 (GMT 0)
- HDI (2021): 0.286 low · 13th of 13

Liptako, formerly Sahel ([sa.ɛl], "Sahel") is one of Burkina Faso's administrative regions. It was created on 2 July 2001. The region's capital is Dori. Four provinces make up the region: Oudalan, Séno, Soum, and Yagha. This region is the northernmost part of the country and is adjacent to Mali and Niger.

As of 2019, the population of the region was 1,094,907 which is 5.34% of the total population of the country.

== Geography ==
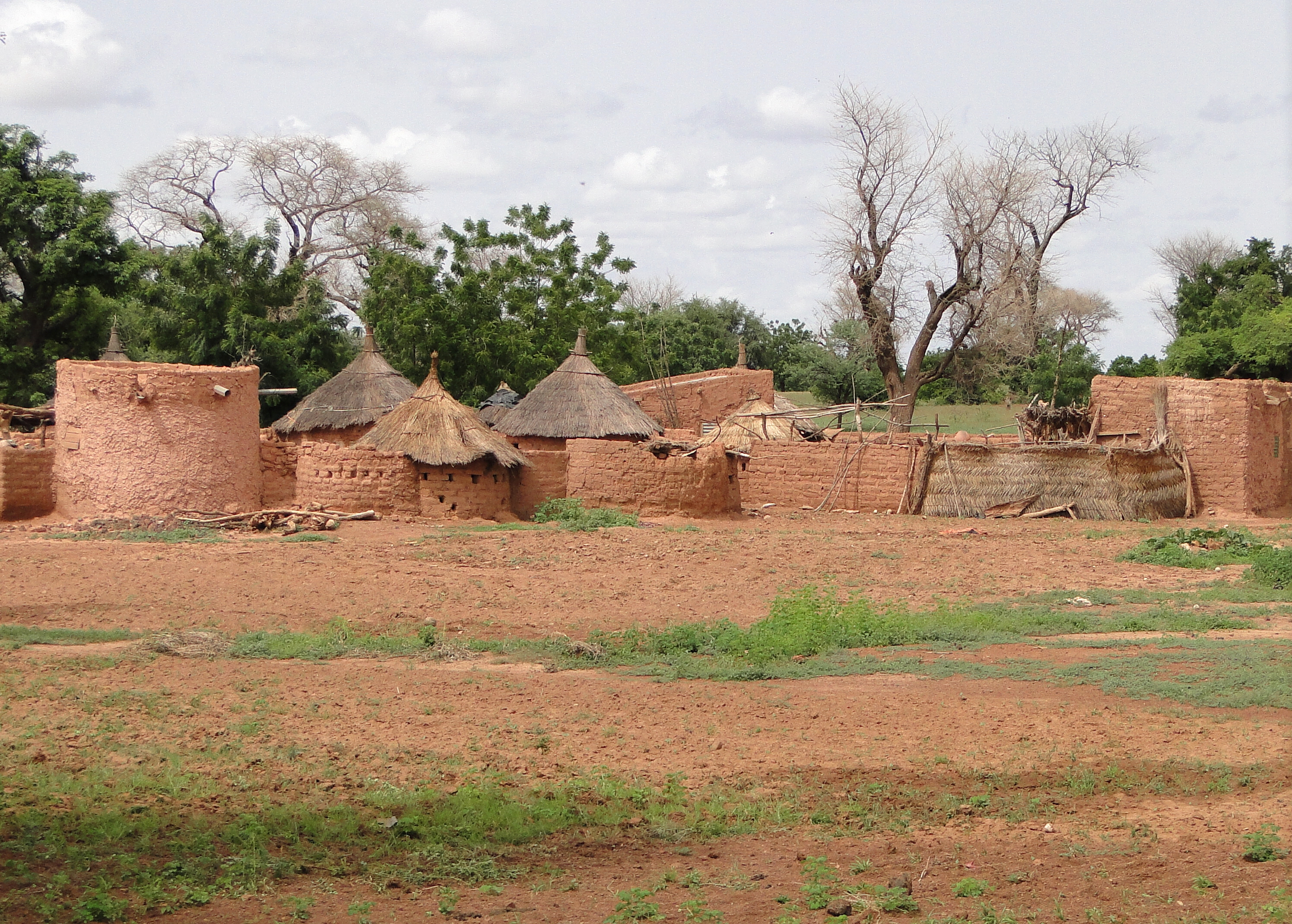
Huts in the region

Most of Burkina Faso is a wide plateau formed by riverine systems and is called Falaise de Banfora. There are three major rivers, the Red Volta, Black Volta and White Volta, which cut through different valleys. The climate is generally hot, with unreliable rains across different seasons. Gold and quartz are common minerals found across the country, while manganese deposits are also common. The dry season is usually from October to May and rains are common during the wet season from June to September. The soil texture is porous and hence the yield is also poor. The average elevation is around 200 m (660 ft) to 300 m (980 ft) above mean sea level. Among West African countries, Burkina Faso has the largest elephant population and the country is replete with game reserves. The northern regions are generally arid and usually have scrub land and semi-deserts. The principal river is the Red Volta, that originates in the northern region and drains into Ghana. The areas near the rivers usually have flies like tsetse and similium, which are carriers of sleep sickness and river blindness. The average rainfall in the region is only around 25 cm (9.8 in) compared to southern regions that receive 100 cm (39 in) rainfall.

== Demographics ==
Historical population
Year	Pop.	±% p.a.
1985	521,911	—
1996	708,332	+2.82%
2006	968,442	+3.18%
2019	1,094,907	+0.95%

The main languages spoken in Sahel Region as of 2006 were Fulfulde, Tamasheq (or "Bella"), and Moore. French is the official language throughout the country. As of 2019, the population of the region was 1,094,907 with 49.3% females. The population in the region was 5.34% of the total population of the country. The child mortality rate was 132, infant mortality rate was 119 and the mortality of children under five was 235. As of 2007, among the working population, there were 72.2% employees, 9.3% under employed, 16% inactive people, 18.5% not working and 2.5% unemployed people in the region.

== Economy ==
As of 2007, there were 683.5 km (424.7 mi) of highways, 249.6 km (155.1 mi) of regional roads and 520.7 km (323.5 mi) of county roads. The first set of car traffic was 9, first set of two-wheeler traffic was 2,344 and the total classified road network was 1,454. The total corn produced during 2015 was 3,235 tonnes, cotton was 000 tonnes, cowpea was 17,804 tonnes, ground nut was 2,829 tonnes, millet was 152,287 tonnes, rice was 2,510 tonnes and sorghum was 72,967 tonnes. The coverage of cereal need compared to the total production of the region was 81.00 per cent.

As of 2007, the literacy rate in the region was 18 per cent, compared to a national average of 28.3 per cent. The gross primary enrolment was 40.8 per cent, post-primary was 7.6 per cent and gross secondary school enrolment was 1.9. There were 0 boys and 0 girls enrolled in the primary and post-secondary level. There were 0 teachers in primary & post-secondary level, while there were 239 teachers in post-primary and post-secondary level.

== Administration ==
Province	Capital	2006
Oudalan Province	Gorom-Gorom	197,240
Séno Province	Dori	264,815
Soum Province	Djibo	348,341
Yagha Province	Sebba	159,485

Burkina Faso gained independence from France in 1960. It was originally called Upper Volta. There have been military coups till 1983 when Captain Thomas Sankara took control and implemented radical left wing policies. He was ousted by Blaise Compaore, who continued for 27 years till 2014, when a popular uprising ended his rule. As per Law No.40/98/AN in 1998, Burkina Faso adhered to decentralization to provide administrative and financial autonomy to local communities. There are 13 administrative regions, each governed by a Governor. The regions are subdivided into 45 provinces, which are further subdivided into 351 communes. The communes may be urban or rural and are interchangeable. There are other administrative entities like department and village. An urban commune has typically 10,000 people under it. If any commune is not able to get 75 per cent of its planned budget in revenues for 3 years, the autonomy is taken off. The communes are administered by elected Mayors. The communes are stipulated to develop economic, social and cultural values of its citizens. A commune has financial autonomy and can interact with other communes, government agencies or international entities.
