= Pama, Burkina Faso =

- Location within Burkina Faso, West Africa
- Coordinates: 11°15′N 0°42′E
- Country: Burkina Faso

Population (2019 census)
  - Total: 13,579
- Time zone: UTC+0 (GMT)

Pama is a town located in the province of Kompienga in Burkina Faso. It is the capital of Kompienga Province.
