= List of airports in Niger =

This is a list of airports in Niger, sorted by location.

== Airports ==
Airport names shown in bold indicate the airport has scheduled service on commercial airlines.

City served	ICAO	IATA	Airport name
Agadez	DRZA	AJY	**Mano Dayak International Airport**
Arlit	DRZL	RLT	Arlit Airport
Diffa	DRZF		**Diffa Airport**
Dirkou	DRZD		Dirkou Airport
Dogondoutchi	DRRC		Dogondoutchi Airport
Dosso	DRRD		Dosso Airport
Gaya	DRRG		Gaya Airport
Goure	DRZG		Goure Airport
Iferouane	DRZI		Iferouane Airport
N'Gourti	unknown	unknown	Jaouro Airport
La Tapoa	DRRP		La Tapoa Airport
Maradi	DRRM	MFQ	**Maradi Airport**
Niamey	DRRN	NIM	**Diori Hamani International Airport**
Ouallam	DRRU		Ouallam Airport
Tahoua	DRRT	THZ	Tahoua Airport
Téra	DRRE		Téra Airport
Tessaoua	DRRA		Tessaoua Airport
Tillabéri	DRRL		Tillabéri Airport
Tillia	DRRZ		Tillia Airport
Zinder	DRZR	ZND	**Zinder International Airport**

== See also ==
- Transport in Niger
- List of airports by ICAO code: D#DR - Niger
- Wikipedia: WikiProject Aviation/Airline destination lists: Africa#Niger
