= Lists of airports in Africa =

This page contains the lists of airports in Africa by country, grouped by region. The lists include both military air bases and civilian airports.

== North Africa ==
- List of airports in Algeria
- List of airports in Egypt
- List of airports in Libya
- List of airports in Morocco
- List of airports in Sudan
- List of airports in Tunisia
- List of airports in Western Sahara

== East Africa ==
- List of airports in British Indian Ocean Territory
- List of airports in Burundi
- List of airports in Comoros
- List of airports in Djibouti
- List of airports in Eritrea
- List of airports in Ethiopia
- List of airports in Kenya
- List of airports in Madagascar
- List of airports in Malawi
- List of airports in Mauritius
- List of airports in Mayotte
- List of airports in Mozambique
- List of airports in Réunion
- List of airports in Rwanda
- List of airports in Seychelles
- List of airports in Somalia
- List of airports in South Sudan
- List of airports in Uganda
- List of airports in Tanzania
- List of airports in Zambia
- List of airports in Zimbabwe

== Central Africa ==
- List of airports in Angola
- List of airports in Cameroon
- List of airports in the Central African Republic
- List of airports in Chad
- List of airports in Democratic Republic of the Congo
- List of airports in the Republic of the Congo
- List of airports in Equatorial Guinea
- List of airports in Gabon
- List of airports in São Tomé and Príncipe

== Southern Africa ==
- List of airports in Botswana
- List of airports in Eswatini
- List of airports in Lesotho
- List of airports in Namibia
- List of airports in South Africa

== Western Africa ==
- List of airports in Benin
- List of airports in Burkina Faso
- List of airports in Cabo Verde
- List of airports in Côte d'Ivoire
- List of airports in the Gambia
- List of airports in Ghana
- List of airports in Guinea
- List of airports in Guinea-Bissau
- List of airports in Liberia
- List of airports in Mali
- List of airports in Mauritania
- List of airports in Niger
- List of airports in Nigeria
- List of airports in Saint Helena, Ascension and Tristan da Cunha
- List of airports in Senegal
- List of airports in Sierra Leone
- List of airports in Togo

== See also ==
- Lists of airports
- List of busiest airports in Africa
- Wikipedia:WikiProject Aviation/Airline destination lists: Africa
