= List of airports by ICAO code: J =

List of airports by ICAO code: A - B - C - D - E - F - G - H - ~~I~~ - J - K - L - M - N - O - P - Q - R - S - T - U - V - W - ~~X~~ - Y - Z

This list article lists aerodromes which have been assigned an ICAO airport code, a 4-letter code, which starts with the letter "J".

Format of entries is:

- ICAO (IATA) – Airport Name – Airport Location

== J: List ==
=== JZ ===
- JZRO (none) – Wright Brothers Field – Jezero Crater, Syrtis Major quadrangle, planet Mars. (Note: This is an unimproved plain functioning as an adhoc aerodrome for the NASA Ingenuity robotic drone helicopter)
