= List of airports in Benin =

Location of airports in Benin

This is a list of airports in Benin, sorted by location.

Benin, officially the Republic of Benin (French: République du Bénin), is a country in West Africa. It borders Togo to the west, Nigeria to the east and Burkina Faso and Niger to the north; its short coastline to the south leads to the Bight of Benin.

== Airports ==
Airport names shown in bold indicate the airport has scheduled service on commercial airlines.

City served	Department	ICAO	IATA	Airport name	Coordinates
Bembèrèkè	Borgou	DBBR		Bembereke Airport	10°16′25″N 002°41′46″E
Bohicon	Zou	DBBC		Cana Airport	07°07′32″N 002°02′49″E
Cotonou	Littoral	DBBB	COO	**Cadjehoun Airport**	06°21′26″N 002°23′04″E
Djougou	Donga	DBBD	DJA	Djougou Airport	09°41′31″N 001°38′15″E
Kandi	Alibori	DBBK	KDC	Kandi Airport	11°08′41″N 002°56′23″E
Natitingou	Atakora	DBBN	NAE	Boundétingou Airport	10°22′37″N 001°21′37″E
Parakou	Borgou	DBBP	PKO	**Parakou Airport**	09°21′25″N 002°36′33″E
Porga	Atakora	DBBO		Porga Airport	11°02′47″N 000°59′35″E
Savé	Collines	DBBS	SVF	Savé Airport	08°01′05″N 002°27′52″E

== See also ==
- Transport in Benin
- List of airports by ICAO code: D#DB - Benin
- Wikipedia: WikiProject Aviation/Airline destination lists: Africa#Benin
