= Penn Valley Airport =

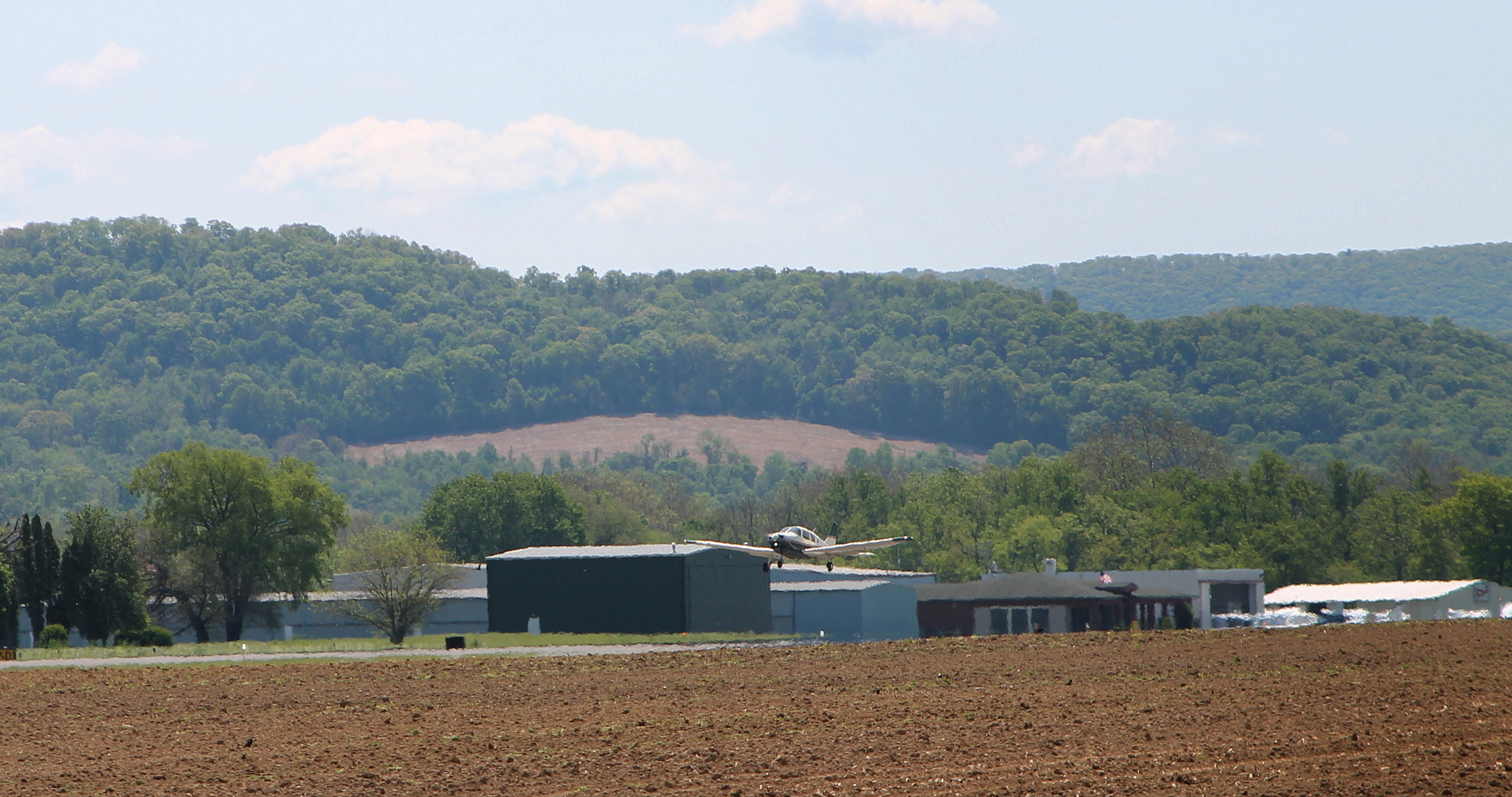
- IATA: SEG; ICAO: KSEG; FAA LID: SEG

Summary
- Airport type: Public
- Owner: Penn Valley Airport Authority
- Serves: Selinsgrove, Pennsylvania
- Elevation AMSL: 463 ft / 141 m
- Coordinates: 40°49′16″N 076°51′51″W

Map
- Location of airport in Pennsylvania SEG (the United States)

Runways
Direction	Length		Surface
Direction	ft	m	Surface
17/35	4,760	1,451	Asphalt

Statistics (2012)
- Aircraft operations: 28,000
- Based aircraft: 30
- Source: Federal Aviation Administration

Penn Valley Airport (IATA: SEG, ICAO: KSEG, FAA LID: SEG) is a public airport in Monroe Township, Snyder County, and is a mile north of Selinsgrove, a borough in Snyder County, Pennsylvania. It is owned by the Penn Valley Airport Authority. The National Plan of Integrated Airport Systems for 2011–2015 categorized it as a general aviation facility.

== Facilities and aircraft ==
Penn Valley Airport covers 149 acres (60 ha) at an elevation of 463 feet (141 m). Its one runway, 17/35, is 4,760 by 75 feet (1,451 x 23 m) asphalt.

In the year ending March 7, 2012 the airport had 28,000 aircraft operations, average 76 per day: 87% general aviation, 12% air taxi, and 1% military. 30 aircraft were then based at the airport: 67% single-engine, 13% ultralight, 10% multi-engine, 7% jet, and 3% helicopter.

== Accidents and incidents ==
- On August 23, 1987, a Piper PA-23-160 registered N4003P with three on-board crashed on takeoff killing all those aboard. The pilot and owner of the aircraft Karl Kovacs was taking two others on a scenic flight of the Susquehanna Valley. However the aircraft was overweight and in low ceilings and fog, Kovacs struggled to gain altitude and was in a high pitch angle and stalled at approximately 750 feet. The cause was determined to be pilot error and gross overload of the Piper.
- On October 4, 2013, a Piper PA-22 crashed on the runway during an attempted takeoff. Two people were seriously injured, National Transportation Safety Board and the Federal Aviation Administration investigated stating the cause was the "pilots failure to perform pre-flight check elevator trim would have shown the aircraft wasn't airworthy."

== See also ==
- List of airports in Pennsylvania
- List of airports by ICAO code: K
