= DRRA =

DRRA can refer to:

- Tessaoua Airport (ICAO: DRRA), an airport serving Tessaoua in Niger.
- Decreasing relative risk aversion in economics, finance, and decision theory
- Disaster Recovery Reform Act of 2018 in the United States
