= Porga attack =

Terrorist attack in Benin

- Part of the Jihadist insurgency in Burkina Faso (alleged)
Date	1-2 December 2021
Location	Porga, Atakora Department, Benin 11°3′0″N 0°58′0″E

Belligerents
Benin	Unknown militants

Casualties and losses
2	1
- Site of the attack

On 1–2 December 2021 a group of unidentified militants attacked a military outpost in Porga, Atakora Department, northwestern Benin near its border with Burkina Faso.

During the attack, two soldiers were killed and several others wounded. One of the attackers was slain by military forces. It has been suggested that the militants could have come from Burkina Faso, which has been fighting a low-intensity conflict against salafi jihadists since 2015. Colonel Didier Ahouanvoédo said that "traces of blood were seen suggesting that other dead or wounded were dragged in the direction of the withdrawal towards a neighboring country [Burkina Faso] where terrorist groups are rife."

The day before, a terrorist attack had occurred in Alibori Department, also in northern Benin, resulting in one of the terrorist's being killed. These two incidents were the second terrorist attacks in Benin since 2019, when Islamists kidnapped a pair of French tourists.

On 10 December militants raided Porga again, leaving four people injured.
