= List of airports in Togo =

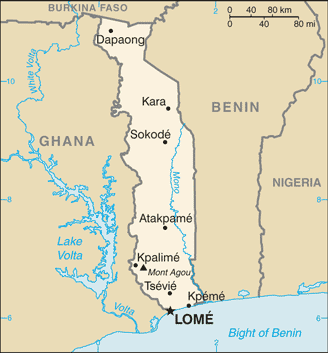
Map of Togo

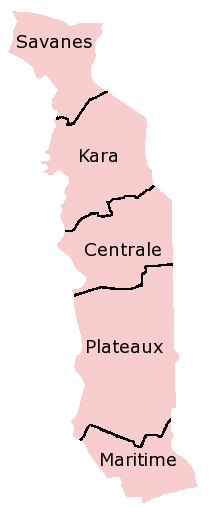
Togo's five regions

This is a list of airports in Togo, sorted by location.

Togo, officially the Togolese Republic, is a country in West Africa bordered by Ghana to the west, Benin to the east, Burkina Faso to the north, and the Gulf of Guinea to the south. The capital city is Lomé. The country is divided into five regions.

== Airports ==
Airport names shown in bold indicate the airport has scheduled service on commercial airlines.

City served	Region	ICAO	IATA	Airport name
Anié	Plateaux	DXKP		Kolokope Airport
Atakpamé	Plateaux	DXAK		Akpaka Airport
Dapaong	Savanes	DXDP		Djangou Airport
Lomé	Maritime	DXXX	LFW	**Lomé-Tokoin International Airport** (Gnassingbé Eyadéma Int'l)
Niamtougou	Kara	DXNG	LRL	Niamtougou International Airport
Sansanné-Mango	Savanes	DXMG		Sansanné-Mango Airport
Sokodé	Centrale	DXSK		Sokodé Airport

== See also ==
- List of airports by ICAO code: D#DX - Togo
- Transport in Togo
