= Dogondoutchi Airport =

Airport in Niger

- IATA: none; ICAO: DRRC

Summary
- Airport type: Public
- Serves: Dogondoutchi
- Elevation AMSL: 961 ft / 293 m
- Coordinates: 13°39′45″N 4°06′00″E

Map
- Location of the airport in Niger

Runways
Direction	Length		Surface
Direction	m	ft	Surface
11/29	1,000	3,281	Dirt
- Source: Google Maps

Dogondoutchi Airport (ICAO: DRRC) is an airport serving Dogondoutchi, Niger. It is 8 kilometres (5.0 mi) east-northeast of the city centre.

== See also ==
- Transport in Niger
- List of airports in Niger
