= List of the busiest airports in Africa =

This is a list of the busiest airports in Africa, ranked by total passengers per year, which includes arrival, departure and transit passengers.

== 2025 statistics ==
	Country	Airport	IATA	City	Total Passengers 2025	Change (2025/2024)
1.	Egypt	Cairo International Airport	CAI	Cairo	31,137,557	▲7.5
2.	South Africa	OR Tambo International Airport	JNB	Johannesburg	19,735,437	▲7.4
3.	Ethiopia	Bole International Airport	ADD	Addis Ababa	13,134,076	▲8.6
4.	Morocco	Mohammed V International Airport	CMN	Casablanca	11,456,284	▲9.3
5.	Egypt	Hurghada International Airport	HRG	Hurghada	11,425,529	▲18.5
6.	South Africa	Cape Town International Airport	CPT	Cape Town	11,113,490	▲7.2
7.	Morocco	Marrakesh Menara Airport	RAK	Marrakesh	10,197,736	▲10.1
8.	Algeria	Houari Boumedienne Airport	ALG	Algiers	10,141,679	▲10.8
9.	Egypt	Sharm el-Sheikh International Airport	SSH	Sharm el-Sheikh	9,046,690	▲32.3
10.	Kenya	Jomo Kenyatta International Airport	NBO	Nairobi	8,996,281	▲2.9
11.	Nigeria	Murtala Muhammed International Airport	LOS	Lagos	7,468,125	▲13.1
12.	Tunisia	Carthage Airport	TUN	Tunis	7,424,405	▲2.0
13.	Nigeria	Nnamdi Azikiwe International Airport	ABV	Abuja	5,794,766	▲12.5
14.	South Africa	King Shaka International Airport	DUR	Durban	5,514,432	▲10.4
15.	Ghana	Accra International Airport	ACC	Accra	3,625,778	▲2.4
16.	Morocco	Agadir–Al Massira Airport	AGA	Agadir	3,495,277	▲11.7
17.	Tanzania	Julius Nyerere International Airport	DAR	Dar es Salaam	3,011,045	▲4.3
18.	Senegal	Blaise Diagne International Airport	DSS	Dakar	2,939,453	▲0.5
19.	Egypt	Marsa Alam International Airport	RMF	Marsa Alam	2,817,308	▲23.3
20.	Morocco	Tangier Ibn Battouta Airport	TNG	Tangier	2,812,029	▲17.2
21.	Tanzania	Abeid Amani Karume International Airport	ZNZ	Zanzibar	2,694,149	▲13.9
22.	Uganda	Entebbe International Airport	EBB	Kampala	2,614,977	▲10.1
23.	Ivory Coast	Félix-Houphouët-Boigny International Airport	ABJ	Abidjan	2,520,594	▲0.9
24.	Algeria	Ahmed Ben Bella Airport	ORN	Oran	2,445,371	▲11.0
25.	Tunisia	Djerba–Zarzis International Airport	DJE	Djerba	2,370,512	▲6.0
26.	Morocco	Rabat–Salé Airport	RBA	Rabat	2,000,000	▲26.0

== 2024 statistics ==
	Country	Airport	IATA	City	2024	Change (2024/2023)
1.	Egypt	Cairo International Airport	CAI	Cairo	28,974,638	▲10.6%
2.	South Africa	OR Tambo International Airport	JNB	Johannesburg	18,371,492	▲34.5%
3.	Spain	Gran Canaria Airport	LPA	Las Palmas de Gran Canaria	15,203,255	▲9.0%
4.	Spain	Tenerife South Airport	TFS	Santa Cruz de Tenerife	13,683,698	▲11.1%
5.	Ethiopia	Bole International Airport	ADD	Addis Ababa	11,799,224	▲13.6%
6.	Morocco	Mohammed V International Airport	CMN	Casablanca	10,449,372	▲6.7%
7.	South Africa	Cape Town International Airport	CPT	Cape Town	10,366,555	▲6.8%
8.	Egypt	Hurghada International Airport	HRG	Hurghada	9,636,689	▲9.6%
9.	Morocco	Marrakesh Menara Airport	RAK	Marrakesh	9,250,943	▲34.0%
10.	Algeria	Houari Boumedienne Airport	ALG	Algiers	9,151,517	▲15.0%
11.	Kenya	Jomo Kenyatta International Airport	NBO	Nairobi	8,754,580	▲6.6%
12.	Spain	Lanzarote Airport	ACE	Lanzarote	8,714,439	▲6.1%
13.	Tunisia	Carthage Airport	TUN	Tunis	7,275,501	▲9.0%
14.	Egypt	Sharm el-Sheikh International Airport	SSH	Sharm el-Sheikh	6,837,007	▲14.2%
15.	Spain	Tenerife North Airport	TFN	San Cristóbal de La Laguna	6,765,619	▲10.5%
16.	Nigeria	Murtala Muhammed International Airport	LOS	Lagos	6,603,088	▼3.2%
17.	Spain	Fuerteventura Airport	FUE	Puerto del Rosario	6,445,952	▲7.1%
18.	Nigeria	Nnamdi Azikiwe International Airport	ABV	Abuja	5,490,131	▼6.5%
19.	South Africa	Durban International Airport	DUR	Durban	4,994,867	▲1.8%
20.	Portugal	Madeira Airport	FNC	Santa Cruz, Madeira	4,804,730	▲4.8%
21.	Ghana	Accra International Airport	ACC	Accra	3,401,214	▲2.7%
22.	Morocco	Agadir–Al Massira Airport	AGA	Agadir	3,124,205	▲35.5%
23.	Senegal	Blaise Diagne International Airport	DSS	Dakar	2,925,964	▼0.6%
24.	Tanzania	Julius Nyerere International Airport	DAR	Dar es Salaam	2,887,382	▲7.4%
25.	France	Roland Garros Airport	RUN	Saint-Denis	2,712,095	▲0.8%

== 2023 statistics ==
	Country	Airport	IATA	City	2023	% Change (2023/2022)
1	Egypt	Cairo International Airport	CAI	Cairo	26,214,633	▲31%
2	South Africa	O. R. Tambo International Airport	JNB	Johannesburg	17,533,720	▲18.6%
3	Spain	Gran Canaria Airport	LPA	Las Palmas de Gran Canaria	13,961,507	▲12.4%
4	Spain	Tenerife South Airport	TFS	Santa Cruz de Tenerife	12,337,325	▲14.0%
5 ▲	Morocco	Mohammed V International Airport	CMN	Casablanca	9,790,914	▲28.2%
6 ▼	South Africa	Cape Town International Airport	CPT	Cape Town	9,710,835	▲23.3%
7 ▲	Egypt	Hurghada International Airport	HRG	Hurghada	8,790,407	▲22.7%
8 ▼	Spain	Lanzarote Airport	ACE	Lanzarote	8,213,259	▲9.5%
9 ▲	Kenya	Jomo Kenyatta International Airport	NBO	Nairobi	8,210,198	▲25.2%
10 ▼	Ethiopia	Bole International Airport	ADD	Addis Ababa	7,973,957	▲19.8%
11 ▲	Algeria	Houari Boumediene Airport	ALG	Algiers	7,960,190	▲26%
12 ▲	Morocco	Marrakesh Menara Airport	RAK	Marrakesh	6,903,964	▲40.8%
13 ▼	Nigeria	Murtala Muhammed International Airport	LOS	Lagos	6,818,574	▲4%
14 ▲	Tunisia	Tunis–Carthage International Airport	TUN	Tunis	6,649,912	▲20.4%
15	Spain	Tenerife North Airport	TFN	San Cristóbal de La Laguna	6,120,505	▲10.0%
16 ▼	Spain	Fuerteventura Airport	FUE	Puerto del Rosario	6,020,403	▲6.7%
17 ▲	Egypt	Sharm el-Sheikh International Airport	SSH	Sharm el-Sheikh	5,981,124	▲32.5%
18 ▼	Nigeria	Nnamdi Azikiwe International Airport	ABV	Abuja	5,874,493	▼3.3%
19	South Africa	King Shaka International Airport	DUR	Durban	4,908,099	▲18.2%
20	Portugal	Madeira Airport	FNC	Santa Cruz, Madeira	4,587,082	▲18.6%

== 2022 statistics ==
	Country	Airport	IATA	City	2022	% Change (2022/2021)
1	Egypt	Cairo International Airport	CAI	Cairo	20,009,336	▲76%
2	South Africa	O. R. Tambo International Airport	JNB	Johannesburg	14,789,508	▲80%
3	Spain	Gran Canaria Airport	LPA	Las Palmas de Gran Canaria	12,417,699	▲80%
4	Spain	Tenerife South Airport	TFS	Santa Cruz de Tenerife	10,821,703	▲135%
5	South Africa	Cape Town International Airport	CPT	Cape Town	7,876,183	▲80%
6	Morocco	Mohammed V International Airport	CMN	Casablanca	7,637,643	▲84%
7	Spain	Lanzarote Airport	ACE	Lanzarote	7,350,451	▲114%
8	Egypt	Hurghada International Airport	HRG	Hurghada	7,164,088	▲46%
9	Ethiopia	Bole International Airport	ADD	Addis Ababa	6,656,516	▲86%
10	Kenya	Jomo Kenyatta International Airport	NBO	Nairobi	6,556,569	▲65%
11	Nigeria	Murtala Muhammed International Airport	LOS	Lagos	6,526,023	▲15%
12	Algeria	Houari Boumediene Airport	ALG	Algiers	6,317,793	▲191%
13	Nigeria	Nnamdi Azikiwe International Airport	ABV	Abuja	5,985,596	▲11%
14	Spain	Fuerteventura Airport	FUE	Puerto del Rosario	5,641,500	▲81%
15	Spain	Tenerife North Airport	TFN	San Cristóbal de La Laguna	5,566,243	▲45
16	Tunisia	Tunis–Carthage International Airport	TUN	Tunis	5,522,011	▲109%
17	Morocco	Marrakesh Menara Airport	RAK	Marrakesh	4,903,681	▲221%
18	Egypt	Sharm el-Sheikh International Airport	SSH	Sharm el-Sheikh	4,579,249	▲1%
19	South Africa	King Shaka International Airport	DUR	Durban	4,151,182	▲48%
20	Portugal	Madeira Airport	FNC	Santa Cruz, Madeira	3,868,767	▲204%

== 2021 statistics ==
	Country	Airport	IATA	ICAO	City	2021	% Change (2021/2020)
1	Egypt	Cairo International Airport	CAI	HECA	Cairo	11,346,398	▲58.8%
2	South Africa	O. R. Tambo International Airport	JNB	FAOR	Johannesburg	8,203,905	▲19.9 %
3	Spain	Gran Canaria Airport	LPA	GCLP	Gran Canaria	6,900,493	▲34.4 %
4	Nigeria	Murtala Muhammed International Airport	LOS	DNMM	Lagos	5,695,408	▲38.4 %
5	Nigeria	Nnamdi Azikiwe International Airport	ABV	DNAA	Abuja	5,406,186	▲37.2 %
6	Egypt	Hurghada International Airport	HRG	HEGN	Hurghada	4,909,379	▲133.8%
7	South Africa	Cape Town International Airport	CPT	FACT	Cape Town	4,757,855	▲18.6 %
8	Spain	Tenerife South Airport	TFS	GCTS	Santa Cruz de Tenerife	4,605,827	▲35.8 %
9	Ethiopia	Bole International Airport	ADD	HAAB	Addis Ababa	4,585,712	▼16.6%
10	Egypt	Sharm el-Sheikh International Airport	SSH	HESH	Sharm el-Sheikh	4,557,288	▲123.7%
11	Morocco	Mohammed V International Airport	CMN	GMMN	Casablanca	4,150,015	▲38.4 %
12	Kenya	Jomo Kenyatta International Airport	NBO	HKJK	Nairobi	3,974,158	?
13	South Africa	King Shaka International Airport	DUR	FALE	Durban	2,806,248	▲24.4 %
14	Tunisia	Tunis–Carthage International Airport	TUN	DTTA	Tunis	2,643,098	▲28.5 %
15	France	Roland Garros Airport	RUN	FMEE	Sainte-Marie	2,473,843	▲25.4 %
16	Portugal	Madeira Airport	FNC	LPMA	Santa Cruz, Madeira	1,894,902	
17	Morocco	Marrakesh Menara Airport	RAK	GMMX	Marrakesh	1,525,491	▲1.08 %

== 2020 statistics ==
	Country	Airport	IATA	ICAO	City	2020	% Change (2020/2019)
1	Egypt	Cairo International Airport	CAI	HECA	Cairo	7,145,562	▼62.3%
2	South Africa	O.R. Tambo International Airport	JNB	FAOR	Johannesburg	6,839,670	▼68.4%
3	Ethiopia	Bole International Airport	ADD	HAAB	Addis Ababa	5,500,000	▼38.3%
4	Spain	Gran Canaria Airport	LPA	GCLP	Gran Canaria	5,134,372	▼51%
5	South Africa	Cape Town International Airport	CPT	FACT	Cape Town	4,012,204	▼62.9%
6	Nigeria	Murtala Muhammed International Airport	LOS	DNMM	Lagos	4,110,395	▼45.2%
7	Spain	Tenerife South Airport	TFS	GCTS	Santa Cruz de Tenerife	3,392,329	▼62%
8	Nigeria	Nnamdi Azikiwe International Airport	ABV	DNAA	Abuja	3,880,283	▼30.1%
9	Morocco	Mohammed V International Airport	CMN	GMMN	Casablanca	2,994,902	▼71.0%
10	South Africa	King Shaka International Airport	DUR	FALE	Durban	2,255,666	▼64.0%
11	Egypt	Hurghada International Airport	HRG	HEGN	Hurghada	2,085,607	▼72.2%
12	Egypt	Sharm el-Sheikh International Airport	SSH	HESH	Sharm el-Sheikh	2,039,357	▼65.4%

== 2019 statistics ==
	Country	Airport	IATA	ICAO	City	2019	Change (19-18)
1	South Africa	O. R. Tambo International Airport	JNB	FAOR	Johannesburg	21,665,403	▲2%
2	Egypt	Cairo International Airport	CAI	HECA	Cairo	15,010,501	▼5.9%
3	Spain	Gran Canaria Airport	LPA	GCLP	Gran Canaria	13,261,405	▼2.3%
4	Spain	Tenerife South Airport	TFS	GCTS	Santa Cruz de Tenerife	11,168,506	▼1.1%
5	Ethiopia	Bole International Airport	ADD	HAAB	Addis Ababa		
6	South Africa	Cape Town International Airport	CPT	FACT	Cape Town	10,979,946	▲2%
7	Morocco	Mohammed V International Airport	CMN	GMMN	Casablanca	10,306,293	
8	Nigeria	Murtala Muhammed International Airport	LOS	DNMM	Lagos	7,496,318	▲2.8 %
9	Tunisia	Tunis–Carthage International Airport	TUN	DTTA	Tunis	6,441,886	▲2.9 %

== 2018 statistics ==
	Country	Airport	IATA	ICAO	City	2018	Change (18-17)
1	South Africa	O. R. Tambo International Airport	JNB	FAOR	Johannesburg	21,231,510	▲0.2%
2	Egypt	Cairo International Airport	CAI	HECA	Cairo	15,010,501	▼5.9%
3	Spain	Gran Canaria Airport	LPA	GCLP	Gran Canaria	13,573,000	
4	Ethiopia	Bole International Airport	ADD	HAAB	Addis Ababa	12,143,938	▲20.6%
5	Spain	Tenerife South Airport	TFS	GCTS	Santa Cruz de Tenerife	11,042,000	
6	South Africa	Cape Town International Airport	CPT	FACT	Cape Town	10,777,524	▲0.8%
7	Morocco	Mohammed V International Airport	CMN	GMMN	Casablanca	9,748,567	▲4.2%
8	Algeria	Houari Boumediene Airport	ALG	DAAG	Algiers	8,400,000	
9	Nigeria	Murtala Muhammed International Airport	LOS	DNMM	Lagos	7,290,530	▲14.5%
10	Kenya	Jomo Kenyatta International Airport	NBO	HKJK	Nairobi	7,039,175	
11	Egypt	Hurghada International Airport	HRG	HEGN	Hurghada	6,600,000	
12	Tunisia	Tunis–Carthage International Airport	TUN	DTTA	Tunis	6,200,000	
13	Spain	Fuerteventura Airport	FUE	GCFV	Puerto del Rosario	6,119,000	
14	South Africa	King Shaka International Airport	DUR	FALE	Durban	5,880,390	
15	Spain	Tenerife North Airport	TFN	GCXO	Tenerife	5,494,000	
16	Morocco	Marrakesh Menara Airport	RAK	GMMX	Marrakesh	5,279,575	▲20.9%
17	Mauritius	Sir Seewoosagur Ramgoolam International Airport	MRU	FIMP	Port Louis	4,100,000	
18	Egypt	Sharm El Sheikh International Airport (Asia)	SSH	HESH	Sharm El Sheikh	3,700,000	
19	Nigeria	Nnamdi Azikiwe International Airport	ABV	DNAA	Abuja	4,879,066	▲40.9%
20	Tanzania	Julius Nyerere International Airport	DAR	HTDA	Dar es Salaam	2,417,090	▲1.3%

== 2017 statistics ==
	Country	Airport	IATA	ICAO	City	2017	
1	South Africa	O.R. Tambo International Airport	JNB	FAOR	Johannesburg	21,180,060	
2	Egypt	Cairo International Airport	CAI	HECA	Cairo	15,959,076	
3	Spain	Gran Canaria Airport	LPA	GCLP	Gran Canaria	13,092,117	
4	Spain	Tenerife South Airport	TFS	GCTS	Santa Cruz de Tenerife	11,249,327	
5	South Africa	Cape Town International Airport	CPT	FACT	Cape Town	10,693,063	
6	Ethiopia	Bole International Airport	ADD	HAAB	Addis Ababa	10,072,828	
7	Morocco	Mohammed V International Airport	CMN	GMMN	Casablanca	9,357,427	
8	Algeria	Houari Boumediene Airport	ALG	DAAG	Algiers	7,823,634	
9	Kenya	Jomo Kenyatta International Airport	NBO	HKJK	Nairobi	7,039,175	
10	Nigeria	Murtala Muhammed International Airport	LOS	DNMM	Lagos	6,367,478	
11	Spain	Fuerteventura Airport	FUE	GCFV	Puerto del Rosario	6,049,401	
12	Tunisia	Tunis-Carthage Airport	TUN	DTTA	Tunis	5,691,037	
13	South Africa	King Shaka International Airport	DUR	FALE	Durban	5,527,747	
14	Egypt	Hurghada International Airport	HRG	HEGN	Hurghada	4,730,232	
15	Spain	Tenerife North Airport	TFN	GCXO	Tenerife	4,704,863	
16	Morocco	Marrakesh Menara Airport	RAK	GMMX	Marrakesh	4,359,865	
17	Mauritius	Sir Seewoosagur Ramgoolam International Airport	MRU	FIMP	Port Louis	3,588,777	
18	Nigeria	Nnamdi Azikiwe International Airport	ABV	DNAA	Abuja	3,462,830	
19	Portugal	Cristiano Ronaldo International Airport	FNC	LPMA	Madeira	3,377,000	
20	Egypt	Sharm El Sheikh International Airport	SSH	HESH	Sharm El Sheikh	2,985,035	
21	Tanzania	Julius Nyerere International Airport	DAR	HTDA	Dar es Salaam	2,385,456	▼3.5%
22	France	Roland Garros Airport	RUN	FMEE	Saint-Denis, Réunion	2,293,242	
23	Egypt	Borg El Arab Airport	HBE	HEBA	Borg El Arab	2,207,723	
24	Senegal	Léopold Sédar Senghor International Airport	DKR	GOOY	Dakar	2,114,269	
25	Ivory Coast	Félix-Houphouët-Boigny International Airport	ABJ	DIAP	Abidjan	2,070,000	
26	Algeria	Ahmed Ben Bella Airport	ORN	DAOO	Oran	1,938,373	
27	South Africa	Port Elizabeth International Airport	PLZ	FAPE	Port Elizabeth	1,620,705	
28	Morocco	Agadir–Al Massira Airport	AGA	GMAD	Agadir	1,544,160	
29	Uganda	Entebbe International Airport	EBB	HUEN	Kampala	1,530,031	
30	Tunisia	Djerba–Zarzis International Airport	DJE	DTTJ	Djerba	1,354,502	
31	Spain	La Palma	SPC	GCLA	La Palma	1,302,485	

== 2016 statistics ==
	Country	Airport	IATA	ICAO	City	2016
1	South Africa	O.R. Tambo International Airport	JNB	FAOR	Johannesburg	20,803,950
2	Egypt	Cairo International Airport	CAI	HECA	Cairo	16,468,082
3	South Africa	Cape Town International Airport	CPT	FACT	Cape Town	10,090,418
4	Ethiopia	Bole International Airport	ADD	HAAB	Addis Ababa	8,730,600
5	Morocco	Mohammed V International Airport	CMN	GMMN	Casablanca	8,616,981
6	Algeria	Houari Boumediene Airport	ALG	DAAG	Algiers	7,572,758
7	Kenya	Jomo Kenyatta International Airport	NBO	HKJK	Nairobi	7,111,501
8	Nigeria	Murtala Muhammed International Airport	LOS	DNMM	Lagos	6,694,747
9	South Africa	King Shaka International Airport	DUR	FALE	Durban	5,192,315
10	Tunisia	Tunis-Carthage Airport	TUN	DTTA	Tunis	4,928,438
11	Nigeria	Nnamdi Azikiwe International Airport	ABV	DNAA	Abuja	4,230,090
12	Morocco	Marrakesh Menara Airport	RAK	GMMX	Marrakesh	3,895,647
13	Mauritius	Sir Seewoosagur Ramgoolam International Airport	MRU	FIMP	Port Louis	3,197,308
14	Sudan	Khartoum International Airport	KRT	HSSS	Khartoum	3,142,751
15	Egypt	Hurghada International Airport	HRG	HEGN	Hurghada	2,906,907
16	Egypt	Borg El Arab Airport	HBE	HEBA	Borg El Arab	2,642,059
17	Tanzania	Julius Nyerere International Airport	DAR	HTDA	Dar es Salaam	2,469,356
18	Ghana	Accra International Airport	ACC	DGAA	Accra	2,381,917
19	France	Roland Garros Airport	RUN	FMEE	Saint-Denis, Réunion	2,107,270
20	Senegal	Léopold Sédar Senghor International Airport	DKR	GOOY	Dakar	1,954,229
21	Ivory Coast	Félix-Houphouët-Boigny International Airport	ABJ	DIAP	Abidjan	1,829,049
22	Egypt	Sharm El Sheikh International Airport	SSH	HESH	Sharm El Sheikh	1,756,554
23	Algeria	Ahmed Ben Bella Airport	ORN	DAOO	Oran	1,675,930
24	South Africa	Port Elizabeth International Airport	PLZ	FAPE	Port Elizabeth	1,582,961
25	Uganda	Entebbe International Airport	EBB	HUEN	Kampala	1,549,549
26	Morocco	Agadir–Al Massira Airport	AGA	GMAD	Agadir	1,334,331
27	Kenya	Moi International Airport	MBA	HKMO	Mombasa	1,325,251
28	Tunisia	Djerba–Zarzis International Airport	DJE	DTTJ	Djerba	1,248,583
29	Zambia	Kenneth Kaunda International Airport	LUN	FLKK	Lusaka	1,147,422
30	Seychelles	Seychelles International Airport	SEZ	FSIA	Victoria	1,074,822
31	Nigeria	Port Harcourt International Airport	PHC	DNPO	Port Harcourt	974,028
32	Tanzania	Abeid Amani Karume International Airport	ZNZ	HTZA	Zanzibar	1,032,284
33	Congo	Maya-Maya Airport	BZV	FCBB	Brazzaville	986,077
34	Gabon	Léon-Mba International Airport	LBV	FOOL	Libreville	939,521
35	Cape Verde	Amílcar Cabral International Airport	SID	GVAC	Sal	914,696
36	Cameroon	Douala International Airport	DLA	FKKD	Douala	912,228
37	Morocco	Fès–Saïs Airport	FEZ	GMFF	Fez	893,103
38	Mozambique	Maputo International Airport	MPM	FQMA	Maputo	889,131
39	Morocco	Rabat–Salé Airport	RBA	GMME	Rabat	873,535
40	Morocco	Tangier Ibn Battouta Airport	TNG	GMTT	Tangier	849,410
41	Madagascar	Ivato International Airport	TNR	FMMI	Antananarivo	833,824
42	Congo	Agostinho-Neto International Airport	PNR	FCPP	Pointe-Noire	817,888
43	DR Congo	N'djili International Airport	FIH	FZAA	Kinshasa	814,500
44	South Africa	East London Airport	ELS	FAEL	East London	802,544
45	Tunisia	Enfidha–Hammamet International Airport	NBE	DTNH	Enfidha	797,857
46	Tunisia	Monastir Habib Bourguiba International Airport	MIR	DTMB	Monastir	792,318
47	Tanzania	Kilimanjaro International Airport	HRO	HTJK	Arusha	785,747
48	Namibia	Hosea Kutako International Airport			Windhoek	773,721
49	Togo	Lomé–Tokoin International Airport			Lomé	758,784
50	South Africa	George Airport			George	738,461

== 2014 statistics ==
	Country	Airport	IATA	ICAO	City	2014	Change (13-14)
1	South Africa	O. R. Tambo International Airport	JNB	FAOR	Johannesburg	19,164,108	▲9.3%
2	Egypt	Cairo International Airport	CAI	HECA	Cairo	14,678,066	▲6.6%
3	South Africa	Cape Town International Airport	CPT	FACT	Cape Town	8,636,294	▲3.4%
4	Morocco	Mohammed V International Airport	CMN	GMMN	Casablanca	7,975,344	▲5.4%
5	Nigeria	Murtala Muhammed International Airport	LOS	DNMM	Lagos	7,561,369	
6	Egypt	Hurghada International Airport	HRG	HEGN	Hurghada	7,223,136	▲25%
7	Ethiopia	Bole International Airport	ADD	HAAB	Addis Ababa	6,931,000	
8	Algeria	Houari Boumediene Airport	ALG	DAAG	Algiers	6,460,303	
9	Kenya	Jomo Kenyatta International Airport	NBO	HKJK	Nairobi	6,386,456	
10	Egypt	Sharm el-Sheikh International Airport	SSH	HESH	Sharm el-Sheikh	6,235,864	▲4.8%
11	Tunisia	Tunis-Carthage Airport	TUN	DTTA	Tunis	5,151,632	
12	South Africa	King Shaka International Airport	DUR	FALE	Durban	4,495,974	▼13.5%
13	Nigeria	Nnamdi Azikiwe International Airport	ABV	DNAA	Abuja	4,159,654	
14	Morocco	Marrakesh Menara Airport	RAK	GMMX	Marrakesh	4,063,490	
15	Mauritius	Sir Seewoosagur Ramgoolam International Airport	MRU	FIMP	Port Louis	2,762,935	
16	Ghana	Accra International Airport	ACC	DGAA	Accra	2,547,527	
17	Egypt	Borg El Arab Airport	HBE	HEBA	Borg El Arab	2,501,704	
18	Tanzania	Julius Nyerere International Airport	DAR	HTDA	Dar es Salaam	2,478,055	
19	Tunisia	Enfidha–Hammamet International Airport	NBE	DTNH	Enfidha	2,225,714	
20	France	Roland Garros Airport	RUN	FMEE	Saint-Denis, Réunion	2,014,111	
21	Tunisia	Djerba–Zarzis International Airport	DJE	DTTJ	Djerba	2,004,261	
22	Senegal	Léopold Sédar Senghor International Airport	DKR	GOOY	Dakar	1,836,769	
23	Morocco	Agadir–Al Massira Airport	AGA	GMAD	Agadir	1,476,603	
24	Uganda	Entebbe International Airport	EBB	HUEN	Kampala	1,449,824	
25	Algeria	Ahmed Ben Bella Airport	ORN	DAOO	Oran	1,370,387	
26	Kenya	Moi International Airport	MBA	HKMO	Mombasa	1,366,504	
27	Nigeria	Port Harcourt International Airport	PHC	DNPO	Port Harcourt	1,337,464	
28	Congo	Maya-Maya Airport	BZV	FCBB	Brazzaville	1,294,863	
29	South Africa	Port Elizabeth International Airport	PLZ	FAPE	Port Elizabeth	1,284,002	
30	Ivory Coast	Félix-Houphouët-Boigny International Airport	ABJ	DIAP	Abidjan	1,267,579	

== 2013 statistics ==
	Country	Airport	IATA	ICAO	City	2013	Change (13/12)
1	South Africa	O.R. Tambo International Airport	JNB	FAOR	Johannesburg	18,792,857	▲0.6%
2	Egypt	Cairo International Airport	CAI	HECA	Cairo	13,773,560	▼6.9%
3	South Africa	Cape Town International Airport	CPT	FACT	Cape Town	8,348,854	▼1.8%
4	Morocco	Mohammed V International Airport	CMN	GMMN	Casablanca	7,559,751	▲5.2%
5	Nigeria	Murtala Muhammed International Airport	LOS	DNMM	Lagos	7,261,178	▲5.6%
6	Egypt	Sharm el-Sheikh International Airport	SSH	HESH	Sharm el-Sheikh	5,953,034	▼11.3%
7	Egypt	Hurghada International Airport	HRG	HEGN	Hurghada	5,782,566	▼23.4%
8	South Africa	King Shaka International Airport	DUR	FALE	Durban	5,196,123	▲9.5%
9	Nigeria	Nnamdi Azikiwe International Airport	ABV	DNAA	Abuja	3,945,897	▲27.0%
10	South Africa	Port Elizabeth Airport	PLZ	FAPE	Port Elizabeth	1,269,634	▼3.5%

== 2012 statistics ==
	Country	Airport	IATA	ICAO	City	2012	Change (12/11)
1	South Africa	O.R. Tambo International Airport	JNB	FAOR	Johannesburg	18,681,458	▼1.2%
2	Egypt	Cairo International Airport	CAI	HECA	Cairo	14,729,300	▲12.8%
3	South Africa	Cape Town International Airport	CPT	FACT	Cape Town	8,505,563	▲0.8%
4	Morocco	Mohammed V International Airport	CMN	GMMN	Casablanca	7,186,331	▼1.4%
5	Egypt	Hurghada International Airport	HRG	HEGN	Hurghada	7,135,972	▲21.4%
6	Nigeria	Murtala Muhammed International Airport	LOS	DNMM	Lagos	6,879,286	▲1.9%
7	Egypt	Sharm el-Sheikh International Airport	SSH	HESH	Sharm el-Sheikh	6,625,153	▲20.9%
8	Ethiopia	Bole International Airport	ADD	HAAB	Addis Ababa	6,500,000	▲28.83%
9	Kenya	Jomo Kenyatta International Airport	NBO	HKJK	Nairobi	6,458,614	▲11.2%
10	Algeria	Houari Boumediene Airport	ALG	DAAG	Algiers	5,404,971	▲13.0%
11	Tunisia	Carthage Airport	TUN	DTTA	Tunis	5,249,021	▲31.2%
12	South Africa	King Shaka International Airport	DUR	FALE	Durban	4,747,224	▼5.8%
13	Nigeria	Nnamdi Azikiwe International Airport	ABV	DNAA	Abuja	3,679,224	▼12.7%
14	Morocco	Marrakesh Menara Airport	RAK	GMMX	Marrakesh	3,373,475	▼1.7%
15	Mauritius	Sir Seewoosagur Ramgoolam International Airport	MRU	FIMP	Mauritius	2,490,862	▼3.7%
16	Tunisia	Enfidha–Hammamet International Airport	NBE	DTNH	Enfidha	2,100,000	▲61.5%
17	Tanzania	Julius Nyerere International Airport	DAR	HTDA	Dar es Salaam	2,088,282	▲14.2%
18	France	La Réunion Roland Garros Airport	RUN	FMEE	Saint-Denis	1,997,800	▼4.2%
19	Egypt	Borg El Arab Airport	HBE	HEBA	Borg El Arab	1,974,678	▲95.3%
20	Tunisia	Djerba-Zarzis Airport	DJE	DTTJ	Djerba	1,969,046	▲31.2%
21	Ghana	Accra International Airport	ACC	DGAA	Accra	1,726,051	▲8.9%
22	Morocco	Agadir–Al Massira Airport	AGA	GMAD	Agadir	1,384,931	▼8.7%
23	South Africa	Port Elizabeth Airport	PLZ	FAPE	Port Elizabeth	1,316,063	▼3.7%
24	Tunisia	Monastir International Airport	MIR	DTMB	Monastir	1,238,757	▲23.9%
25	Nigeria	Port Harcourt International Airport	PHC	DNPO	Port Harcourt	1,192,136	▼11.5%
26	Egypt	Marsa Alam International Airport	RMF	HEMA	Marsa Alam	913,61	▲32.8%

== 2011 statistics ==
	Country	Airport	IATA	ICAO	City	2011	Change (11/10)
1.	South Africa	O.R. Tambo International Airport	JNB	FAOR	Johannesburg	18,922,346	▲2.9%
2.	Egypt	Cairo International Airport	CAI	HECA	Cairo	13,037,541	▼19.3%
3.	South Africa	Cape Town International Airport	CPT	FACT	Cape Town	8,436,562	▲4.1%
4.	Morocco	Mohammed V International Airport	CMN	GMMN	Casablanca	7,290,314	▲0.7%
5.	Nigeria	Murtala Muhammed International Airport	LOS	DNMM	Lagos	6,746,290	▲7.6%
6.	Egypt	Hurghada International Airport	HRG	HEGN	Hurghada	5,875,423	▼25.9%
7.	Kenya	Jomo Kenyatta International Airport	NBO	HKJK	Nairobi	5,803,635	▲5.8%
8.	Egypt	Sharm el-Sheikh International Airport	SSH	HESH	Sharm el-Sheikh	5,476,388	▼27.0%
9.	Ethiopia	Bole International Airport	ADD	HAAB	Addis Ababa	5,045,213	▲25.0%
10.	South Africa	King Shaka International Airport	DUR	FALE	Durban	5,038,231	▲6.0%
11.	Algeria	Houari Boumedienne Airport	ALG	DAAG	Algiers	4,793,172	▲7.0%
12.	Nigeria	Nnamdi Azikiwe International Airport	ABV	DNAA	Abuja	4,216,147	▲7.5%
13.	Tunisia	Carthage Airport	TUN	DTTA	Tunis	3,994,705	▼13.2%
14.	Morocco	Marrakesh Menara Airport	RAK	GMMX	Marrakesh	3,430,174	▲0.1%
15.	Mauritius	Sir Seewoosagur Ramgoolam International Airport	MRU	FIMP	Mauritius	2,587,526	▲6.3%
16.	France	La Réunion Roland Garros Airport	RUN	FMEE	Saint-Denis	2,085,047	▲9.1%
17.	Senegal	Léopold Sédar Senghor International Airport	DKR	GOOY	Dakar	1,838,190	▲9.0%
18.	Tanzania	Julius Nyerere International Airport	DAR	HTDA	Dar es Salaam	1,829,219	▲17.5%
19.	Tunisia	Djerba–Zarzis International Airport	DJE	DTTJ	Djerba	1,781,000	unknown
20.	Ghana	Accra International Airport	ACC	DGAA	Accra	1,585,602	▲14.3%
21.	Morocco	Agadir–Al Massira Airport	AGA	GMAD	Agadir	1,516,247	▼6.5%
22.	South Africa	Port Elizabeth Airport	PLZ	FAPE	Port Elizabeth	1,366,204	▼2.5%
23.	Tunisia	Enfidha–Hammamet International Airport	NBE	DTNH	Enfidha	1,300,000	▲160.0%
24.	Nigeria	Port Harcourt International Airport	PHC	DNPO	Port Harcourt	1,206,492	▼0.4%
25.	Tunisia	Monastir International Airport	MIR	DTMB	Monastir	1,000,007	▼70.3%

== 2010 statistics ==
	Country	Airport	IATA	ICAO	City	2010	Change (10/09)
1.	South Africa	O.R. Tambo International Airport	JNB	FAOR	Johannesburg	18,383,549	▲11.4%
2.	Egypt	Cairo International Airport	CAI	HECA	Cairo	16,148,480	▲12.3%
3.	Egypt	Sharm el-Sheikh International Airport	SSH	HESH	Sharm el-Sheikh	8,693,990	▲17.0%
4.	South Africa	Cape Town International Airport	CPT	FACT	Cape Town	8,107,648	▲5.0%
5.	Egypt	Hurghada International Airport	HRG	HEGN	Hurghada	8,062,652	▲19.8%
6.	Morocco	Mohammed V International Airport	CMN	GMMN	Casablanca	7,243,462	▲13.3%
7.	Nigeria	Murtala Muhammed International Airport	LOS	DNMM	Lagos	6,273,545	▲11.1%
8.	Kenya	Jomo Kenyatta International Airport	NBO	HKJK	Nairobi	5,485,771	▲8.0%
9.	South Africa	King Shaka International Airport	DUR	FALE	Durban	4,757,800	▲10.5%
10.	Ethiopia	Bole International Airport	ADD	HAAB	Addis Ababa	4,041,365	▲13.83
11.	Nigeria	Nnamdi Azikiwe International Airport	ABV	DNAA	Abuja	3,922,547	▲22.7%
12.	Morocco	Marrakesh Menara Airport			Marrakesh	3,453,044	▲15.0%
13.	Mauritius	Sir Seewoosagur Ramgoolam International Airport	MRU	FIMP	Mauritius	2,509,156	▲8.5%
14.	France	La Réunion Roland Garros Airport	RUN	FMEE	Saint-Denis	1,911,336	▲13.5%
15.	Senegal	Léopold Sédar Senghor International Airport	DKR	GOOY	Dakar	1,687,006	unknown
16.	Morocco	Agadir–Al Massira Airport	AGA	GMAD	Agadir	1,621,272	▲11.3%
17.	Tanzania	Julius Nyerere International Airport	DAR	HTDA	Dar es Salaam	1,556,410	▲9.4%
18.	South Africa	Port Elizabeth Airport	PLZ	FAPE	Port Elizabeth	1,400,688	▲3.2%
19.	Ghana	Accra International Airport	ACC	DGAA	Accra	1,387,045	unknown
20.	Nigeria	Port Harcourt International Airport	PHC	DNPO	Port Harcourt	1,211,816	▲12.0%
21.	South Africa	Lanseria International Airport			Krugersdorp	1,000,000	unknown

== 2009 statistics ==
	Country	Airport	IATA	ICAO	City	2009	Change (09/08)	Worldwide ranking
1.	South Africa	OR Tambo International Airport	JNB	FAOR	Johannesburg	17,607,255	▼5.5%	74
2.	Egypt	Cairo International Airport			Cairo	14,378,842	▲0.1%	93
4.	South Africa	Cape Town International Airport	CPT	FACT	Cape Town	7,725,223	▼4.4%	169
5.	Egypt	Sharm el-Sheikh International Airport	SSH	HESH	Sharm el-Sheikh	7,419,467	▼4.2%	173
6.	Egypt	Hurghada International Airport	HRG	HEGN	Hurghada	6,728,291	▼0.2%	184
7.	Morocco	Mohammed V International Airport	CMN	GMMN	Casablanca	6,392,789	▲2.9%	191
8.	Nigeria	Murtala Muhammed International Airport	LOS	DNMM	Lagos	5,654,122	▲9.1%	209
9.	Kenya	Jomo Kenyatta International Airport	NBO	HKJK	Nairobi	5,077,968	▲6.9%	223
10.	Algeria	Houari Boumedienne Airport	ALG	DAAG	Algiers	4,474,970	▲8.4%	252
11.	South Africa	Durban International Airport			Durban	4,310,095	▼3.3%	255
12.	Tunisia	Carthage Airport	TUN	DTTA	Tunis	4,257,323	▲0.9%	256
13.	Tunisia	Monastir International Airport			Monastir	3,831,924	▼10.1%	272
14.	Ethiopia	Bole International Airport	ADD	HAAB	Addis Ababa	3,552,448	▲6.8%	284
15.	Nigeria	Nnamdi Azikiwe International Airport	ABV	DNAA	Abuja	3,206,683	▲21.1%	304
16.	Morocco	Marrakesh Menara Airport			Marrakesh	2,982,151	▼3.8%	318
17.	Tunisia	Djerba–Zarzis International Airport	DJE	DTTJ	Djerba	2,457,069	▼6.3%	355
18.	Angola	Quatro de Fevereiro Airport			Luanda	2,430,794	▲9.4%	358
19.	Mauritius	Sir Seewoosagur Ramgoolam International Airport	MRU	FIMP	Mauritius	2,381,810	▼8.7%	358
20.	Sudan	Khartoum International Airport	KRT	HSSS	Khartoum	2,178,097	▼8.0%	372
21.	Egypt	Luxor International Airport			Luxor	1,847,201	▼14.5%	388
22.	France	Roland Garros Airport	RUN	FMEE	Saint-Denis, Réunion	1,749,958	▲5.8%	402
23.	Senegal	Léopold Sédar Senghor International Airport	DKR	GOOY	Dakar	1,554,546	▼13.8%	431
24.	Morocco	Agadir–Al Massira Airport	AGA	GMAD	Agadir	1,456,217	unknown	unknown
25.	Tanzania	Julius Nyerere International Airport	DAR	HTDA	Dar es Salaam	1,422,846	▼7.8%	455
26.	Ghana	Accra International Airport	ACC	DGAA	Accra	1,407,734	▲3.2%	456
27.	South Africa	Port Elizabeth Airport	PLZ	FAPE	Port Elizabeth	1,357,696	▼7.5%	464
28.	Kenya	Moi International Airport	MBA	HKMO	Mombasa	1,113,874	▲25.6%	504
29.	Algeria	Oran Es Sénia Airport			Oran	1,101,797	▲10.8%	509
30.	Egypt	Alexandria International Airport			Alexandria	1,097,905	▼0.4%	510
31.	Nigeria	Port Harcourt International Airport	PHC	DNPO	Port Harcourt	1,080,088	▲24.4%	517
32.	Ivory Coast	Port Bouet Airport			Abidjan	959,960	▼0.5%	539
33.	Egypt	Aswan International Airport			Aswan	863,795	▼22.0%	563
34.	Congo	Maya-Maya Airport	BZV	FCBB	Brazzaville	730,013	▼2.1%	598
35.	Gabon	Libreville International Airport			Libreville	721,411	▼1.0%	602
36.	Cameroon	Douala International Airport	DLA	FKKD	Douala	704,765	▼0.7%	606
37.	Namibia	Hosea Kutako International Airport			Windhoek	681,317	▼4.8%	616
38.	South Africa	East London Airport	ELS	FAEL	East London	674,680	▼5.6%	617
39.	DR Congo	N'djili Airport	FIH	FZAA	Kinshasa	672,347	▲1.4%	620
40.	Mozambique	Maputo International Airport	MPM	FQMA	Maputo	668,706	▼0.1%	621
41.	Morocco	Tangier Ibn Battouta Airport	TNG	GMTT	Tangier	646,370	▲35.9%	628
42.	Zambia	Lusaka International Airport			Lusaka	639,491	▼17.4%	630
43.	Mali	Bamako–Sénou International Airport			Bamako	628,290	▲4.3%	633
44.	Zimbabwe	Harare International Airport			Harare	612,208	▼9.2%	639
45.	Madagascar	Ivato International Airport	TNR	FMMI	Antananarivo	611,175	▼26.3%	640
46.	Tanzania	Abeid Amani Karume International Airport	ZNZ	HTZA	Zanzibar	539,202	▼4.2%	666
47.	Morocco	Fes–Saïss Airport			Fes	527,180	▲28.8%	676
48.	South Africa	George Airport			George	527,026	▼16.4%	677
49.	Algeria	Oued Irara–Krim Belkacem Airport			Hassi Messaoud	450,036	▼0.1%	711
50.	Tanzania	Kilimanjaro International Airport			Arusha, Moshi	427,159	▼18.2%	724

== 2008 statistics ==
	Country	Airport	IATA	ICAO	City	2008	Change (08/07)
1.	South Africa	OR Tambo International Airport	JNB	FAOR	Johannesburg	18,501,628	▼4.3%
2.	Egypt	Cairo International Airport	CAI	HECA	Cairo	14,360,029	▲14.2%
3.	South Africa	Cape Town International Airport	CPT	FACT	Cape Town	8,077,435	▼2.9%
4.	Egypt	Sharm el-Sheikh International Airport	SSH	HESH	Sharm el-Sheikh	7,747,422	▲20.8%
5.	Egypt	Hurghada International Airport	HRG	HEGN	Hurghada	6,741,017	▲13.4%
6.	Morocco	Mohammed V International Airport	CMN	GMMN	Casablanca	6,209,711	▲6.0%
7.	Nigeria	Murtala Muhammed International Airport	LOS	DNMM	Lagos	5,184,354	▲23.5%
8.	Kenya	Jomo Kenyatta International Airport	NBO	HKJK	Nairobi	4,751,159	▲3.0%
9.	South Africa	Durban International Airport			Durban	4,458,715	▼7.1%
10.	Tunisia	Monastir International Airport	MIR	DTMB	Monastir	4,262,263	▲0.8%
11.	Tunisia	Carthage Airport	TUN	DTTA	Tunis	4,218,328	▲3.5%
12.	Algeria	Houari Boumedienne Airport	ALG	DAAG	Algiers	4,126,795	▲6.0%
13.	Ethiopia	Bole International Airport	ADD	HAAB	Addis Ababa	3,325,618	▲9.0%
14.	Morocco	Marrakesh Menara Airport			Marrakesh	3,100,495	▲1.6%
15.	Nigeria	Nnamdi Azikiwe International Airport	ABV	DNAA	Abuja	2,647,198	▲7.0%
16.	Tunisia	Djerba-Zarzis Airport	DJE	DTTJ	Djerba	2,621,931	▲2.8%
17.	Mauritius	Sir Seewoosagur Ramgoolam International Airport	MRU	FIMP	Plaisance	2,609,265	▲1.4%
18.	Sudan	Khartoum International Airport	KRT	HSSS	Khartoum	2,368,642	unknown
19.	Angola	Quatro de Fevereiro Airport			Luanda	2,222,638	unknown
20.	Egypt	Luxor International Airport			Luxor	2,160,462	▲9.7%
21.	Senegal	Yoff Airport			Dakar	1,802,559	▲5.0%
22.	France	Roland Garros Airport	RUN	FMEE	Saint-Denis, Réunion	1,654,105	unknown
23.	Tanzania	Julius Nyerere International Airport	DAR	HTDA	Dar es Salaam	1,542,778	▲6.4%
24.	South Africa	Port Elizabeth Airport	PLZ	FAPE	Port Elizabeth	1,468,176	unknown
25.	Ghana	Accra International Airport	ACC	DGAA	Accra	1,364,654	unknown
26.	Egypt	Aswan International Airport			Aswan	1,106,809	unknown
27.	Egypt	Alexandria International Airport			Alexandria	1,102,497	unknown

== Gallery ==
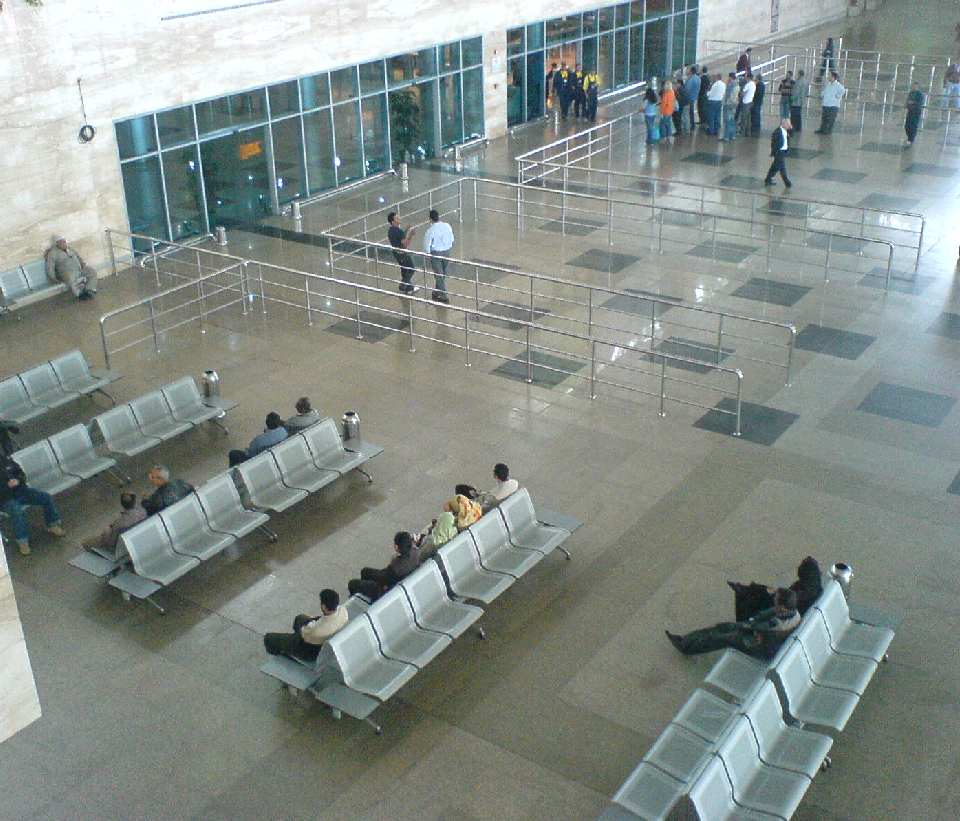
Cairo International Airport

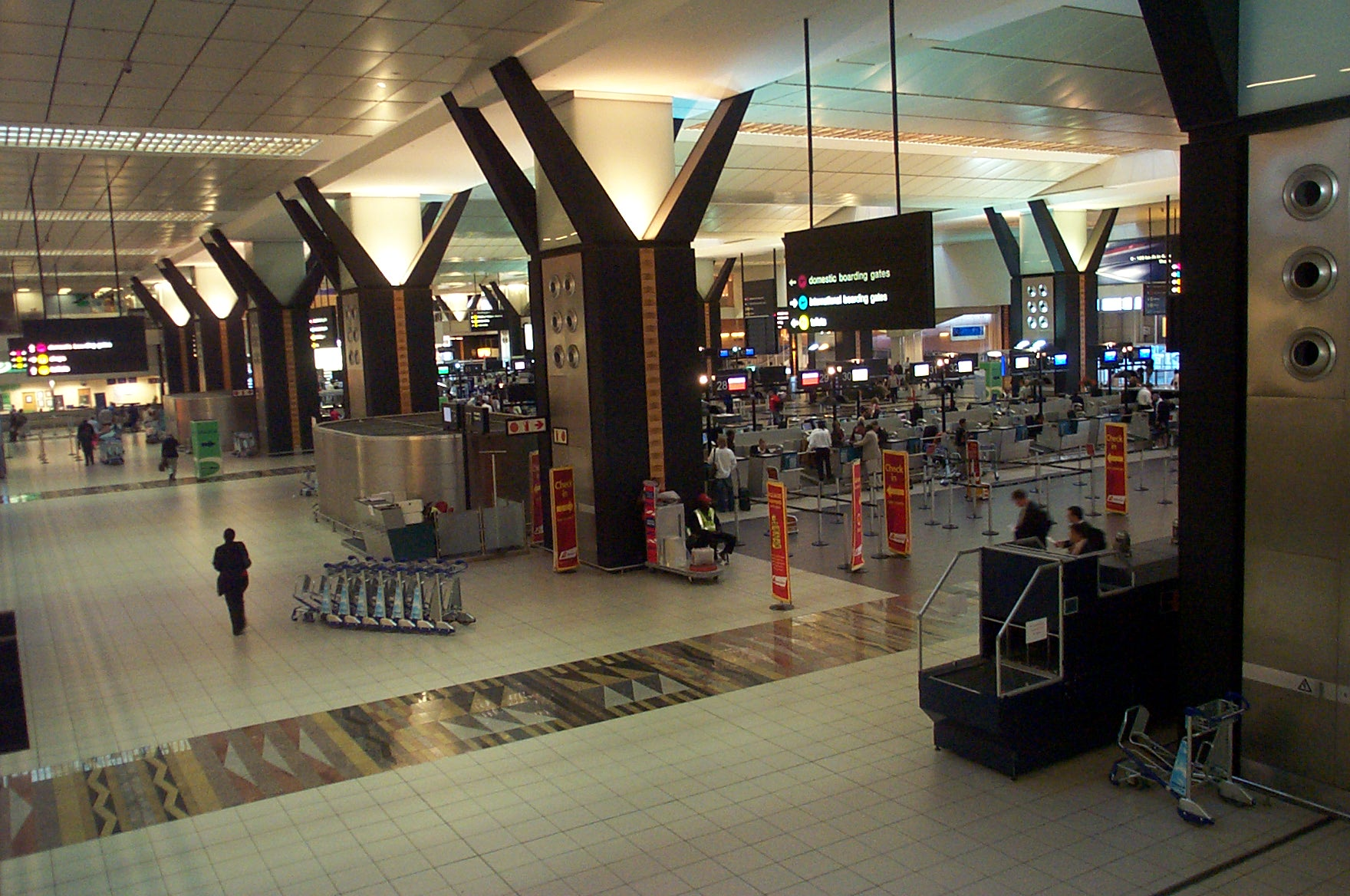
OR Tambo International Airport

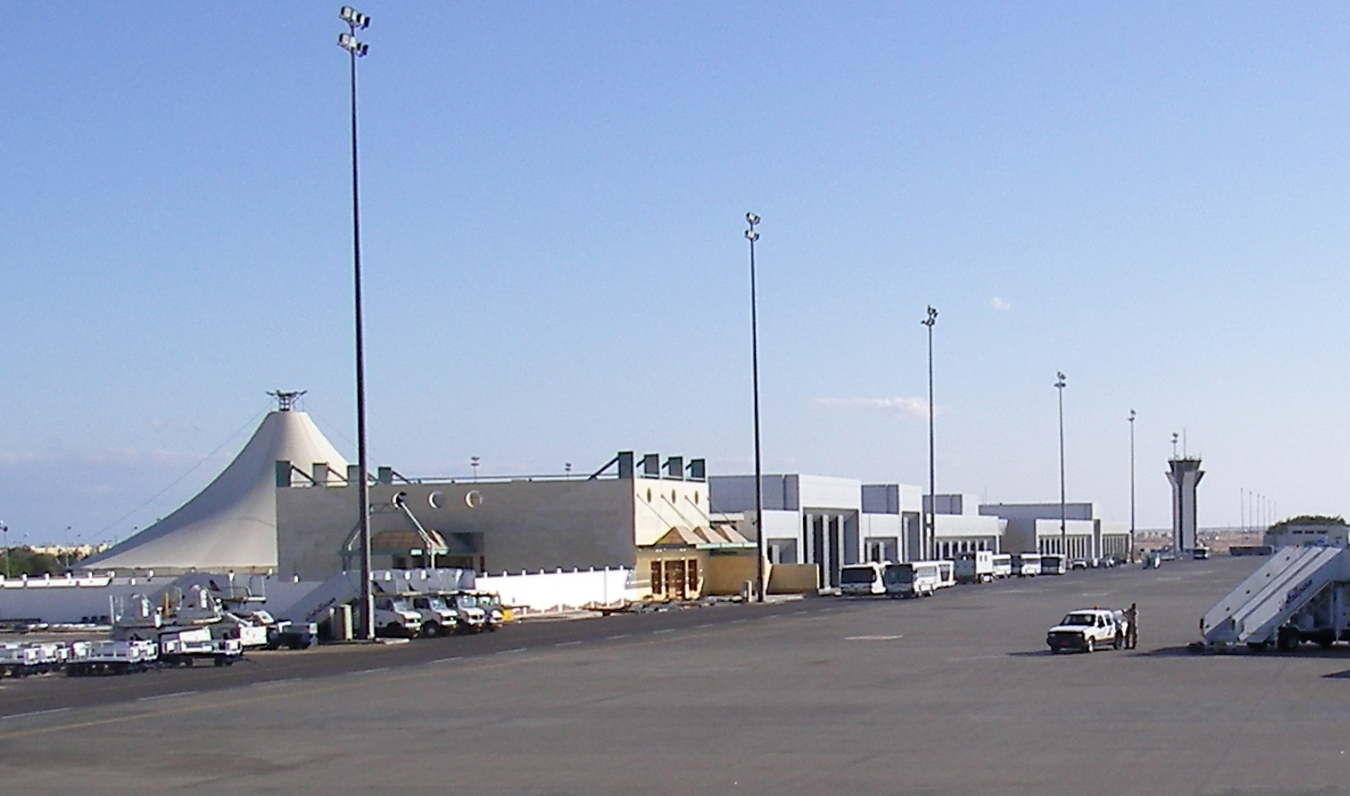
Hurghada International Airport

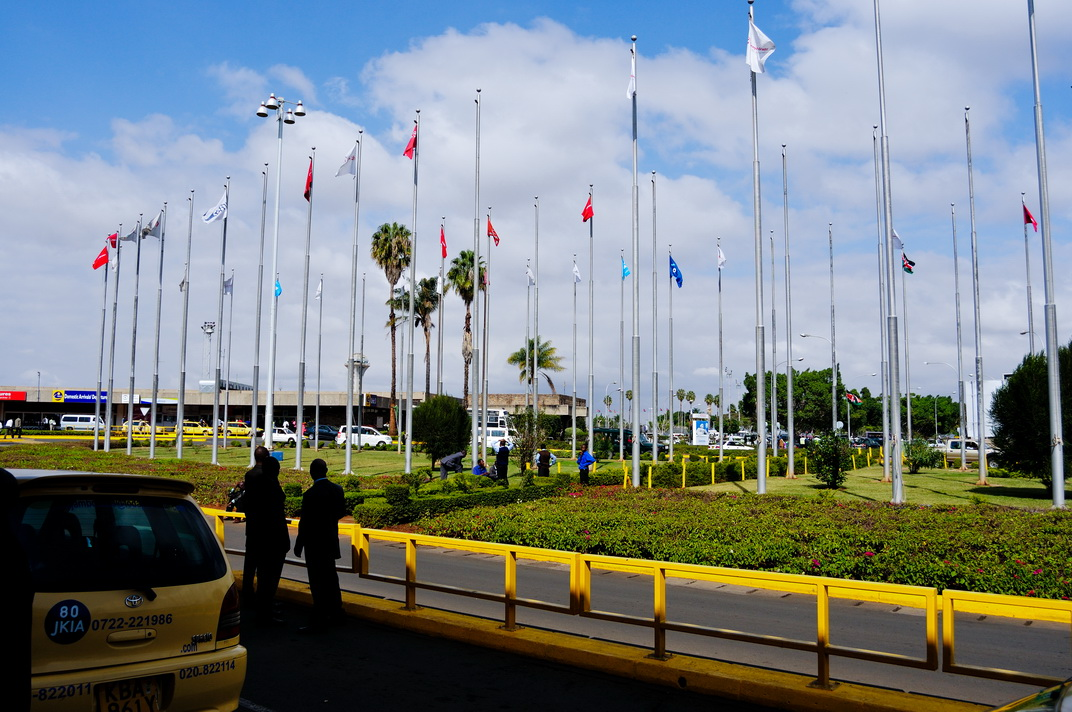
Jomo Kenyatta International Airport

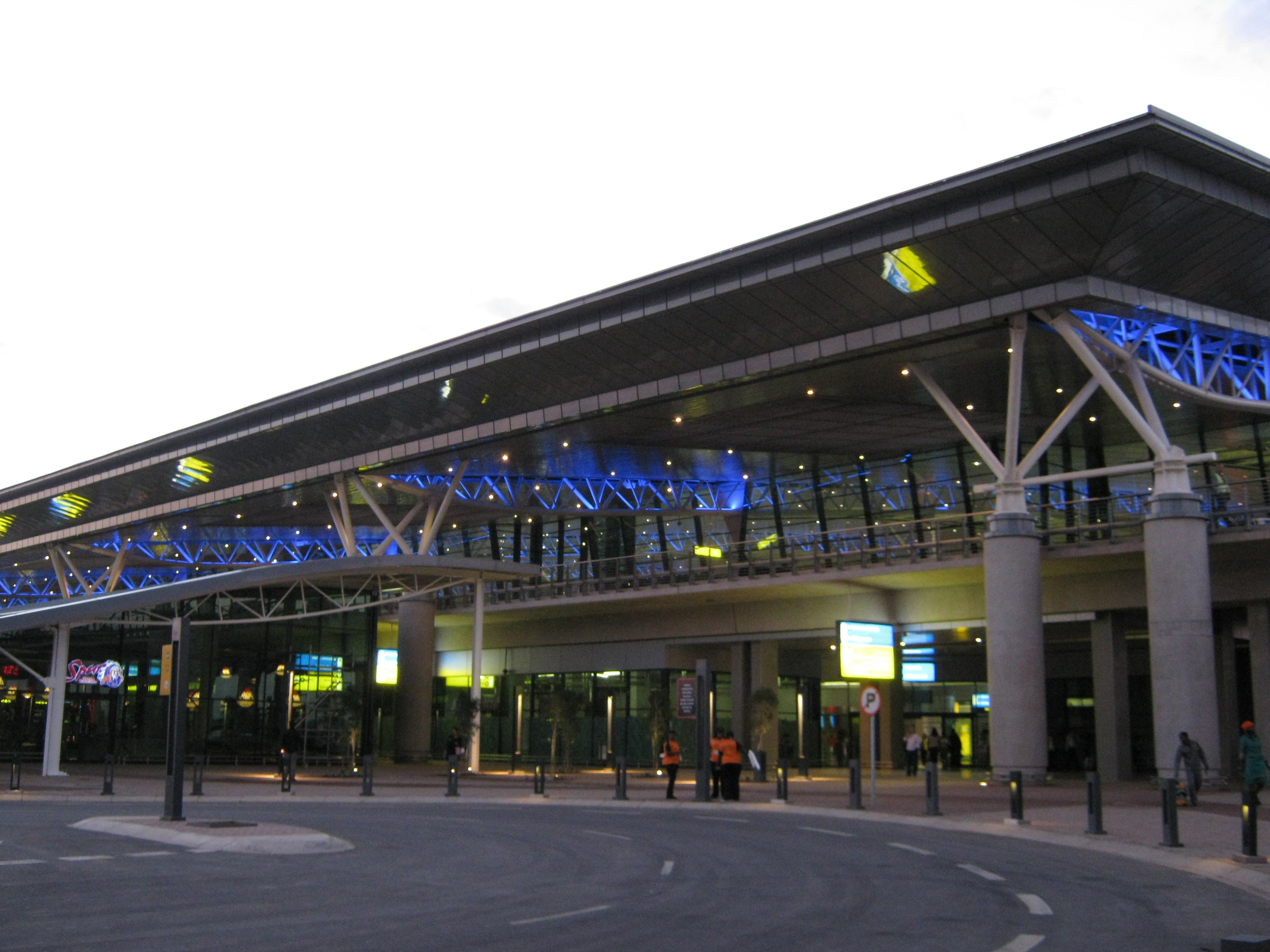
King Shaka International Airport

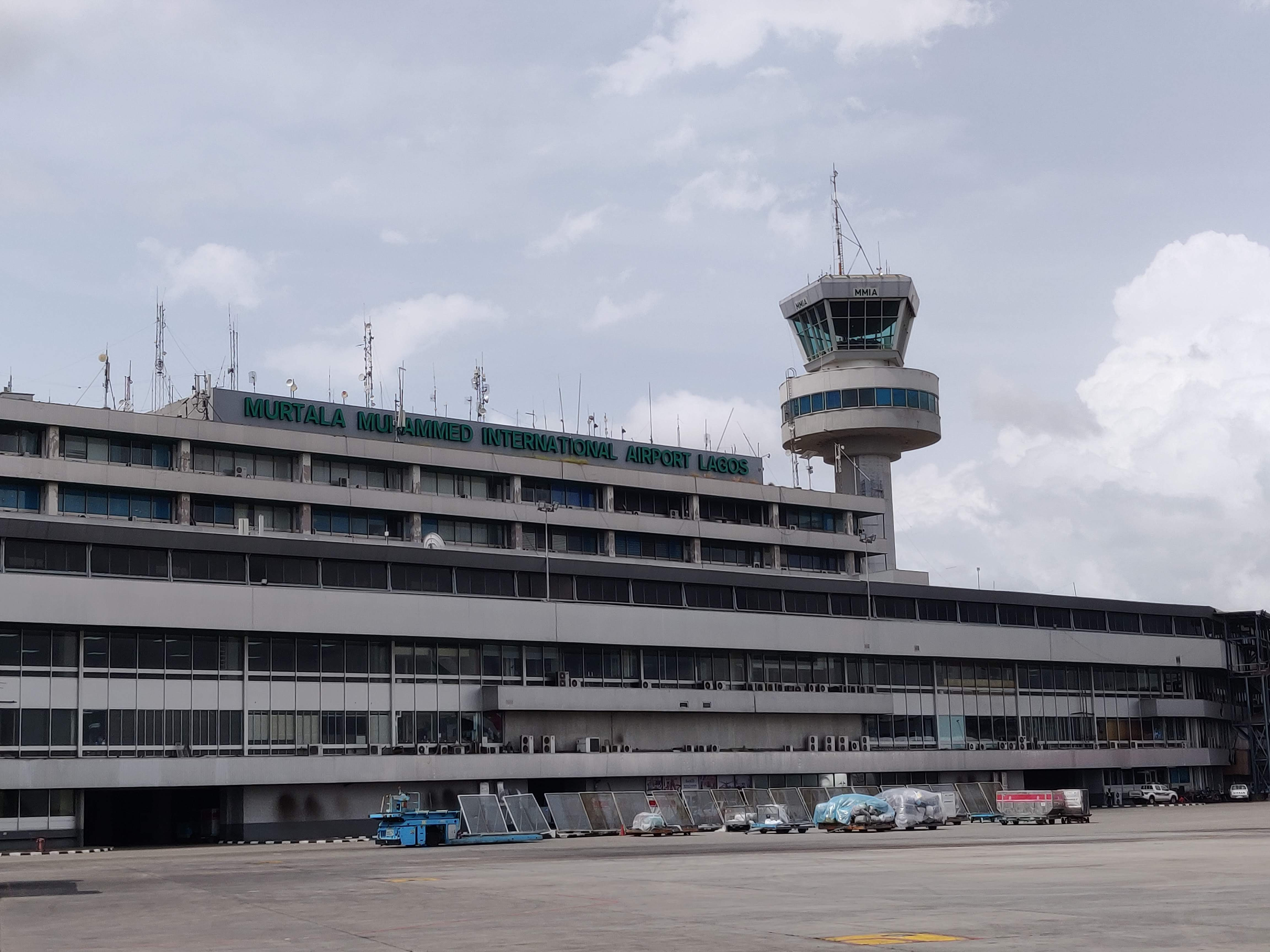
Murtala Muhammad International Airport

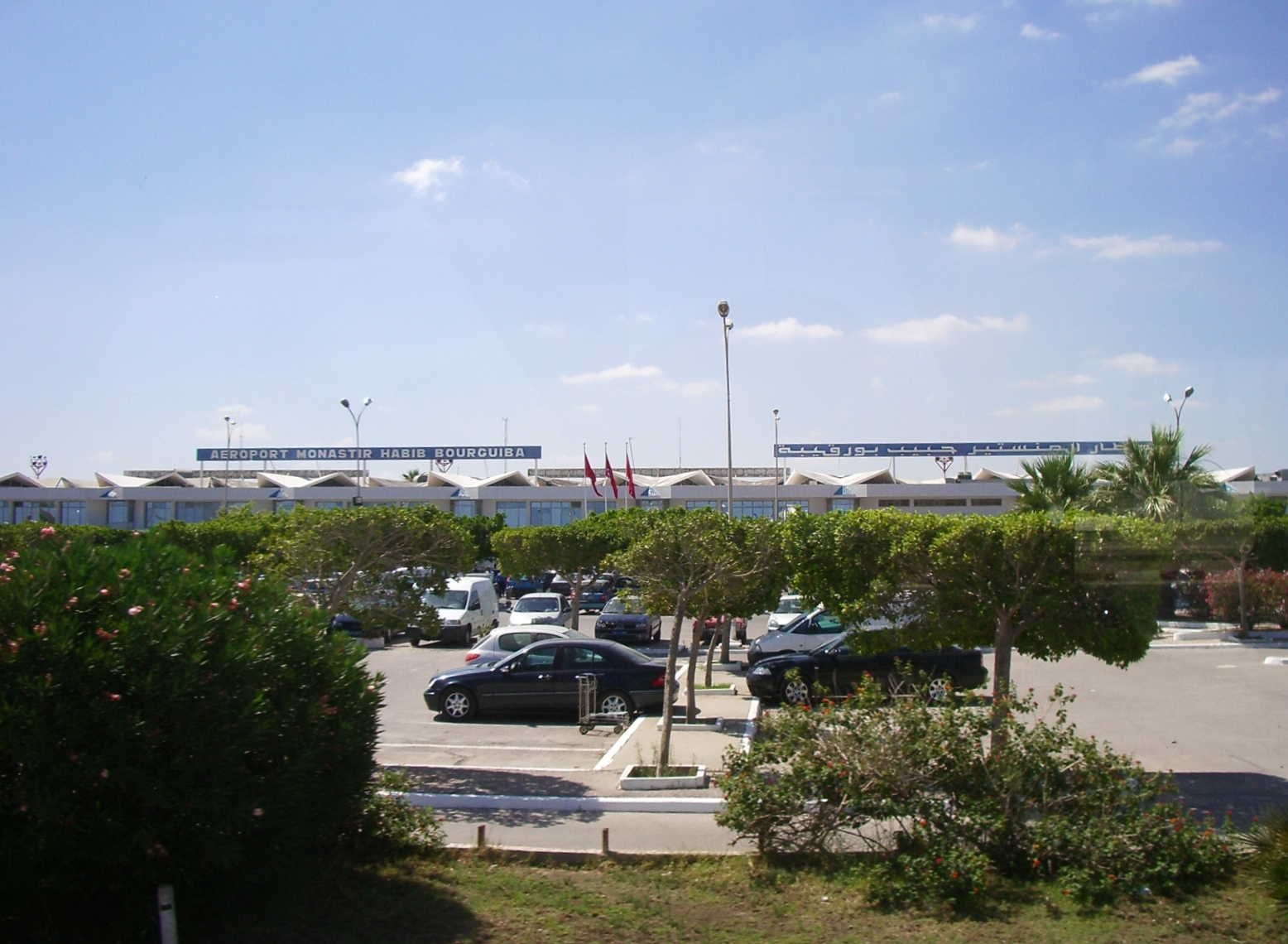
Monastir International Airport

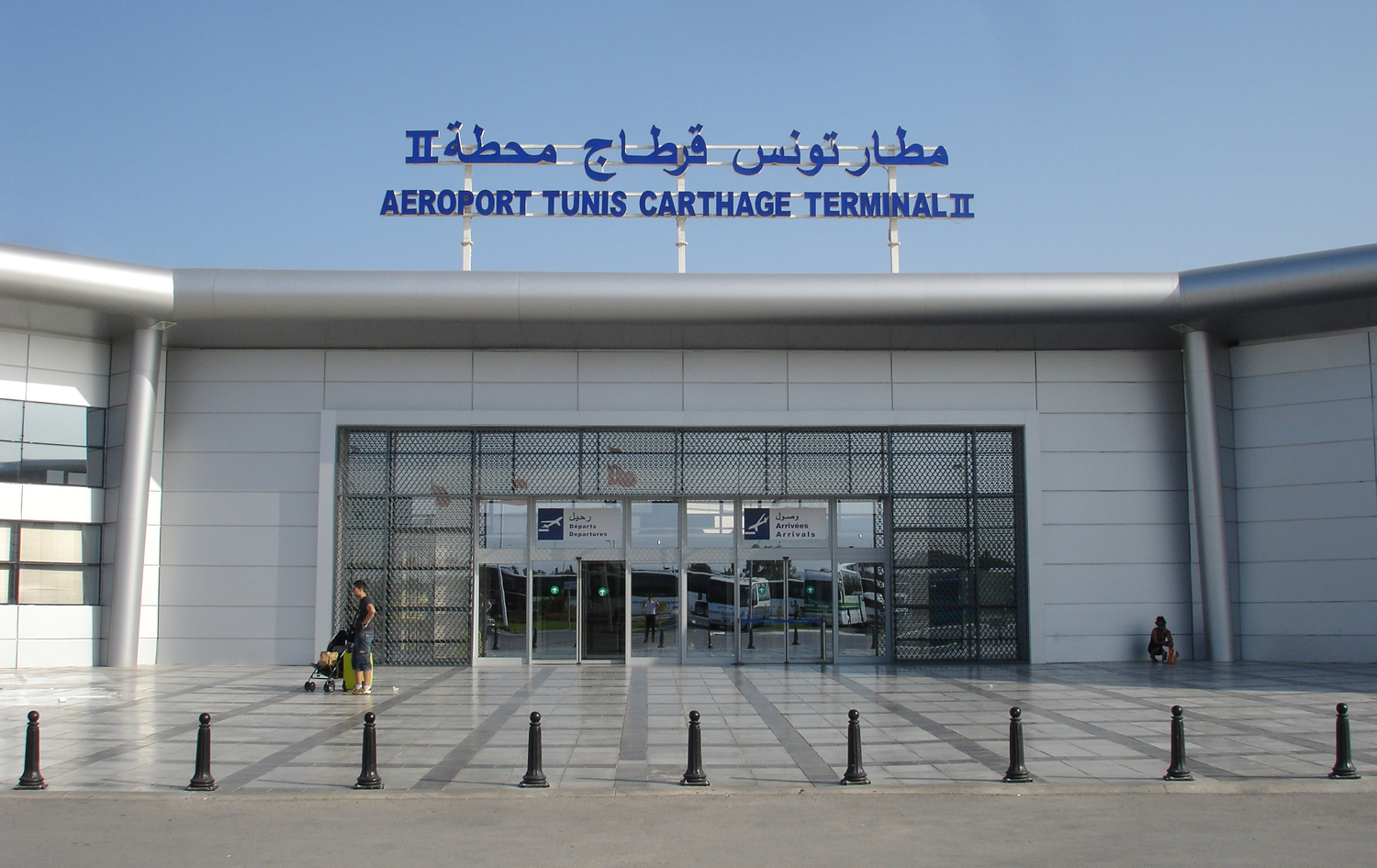
Tunis-Carthage International Airport

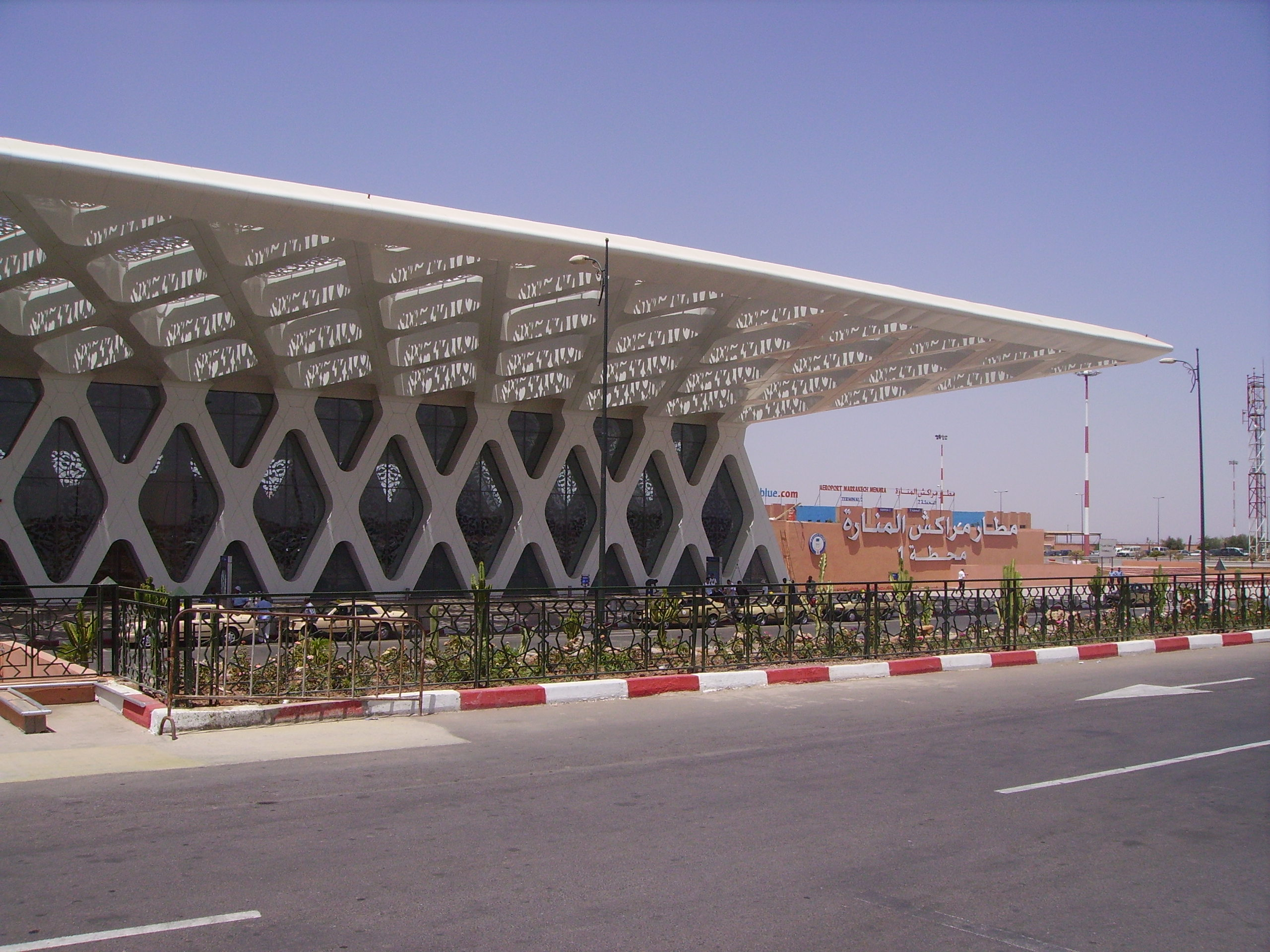
Marrakesh Menara Airport

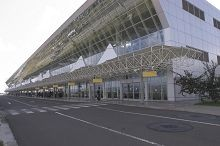
Bole International Airport

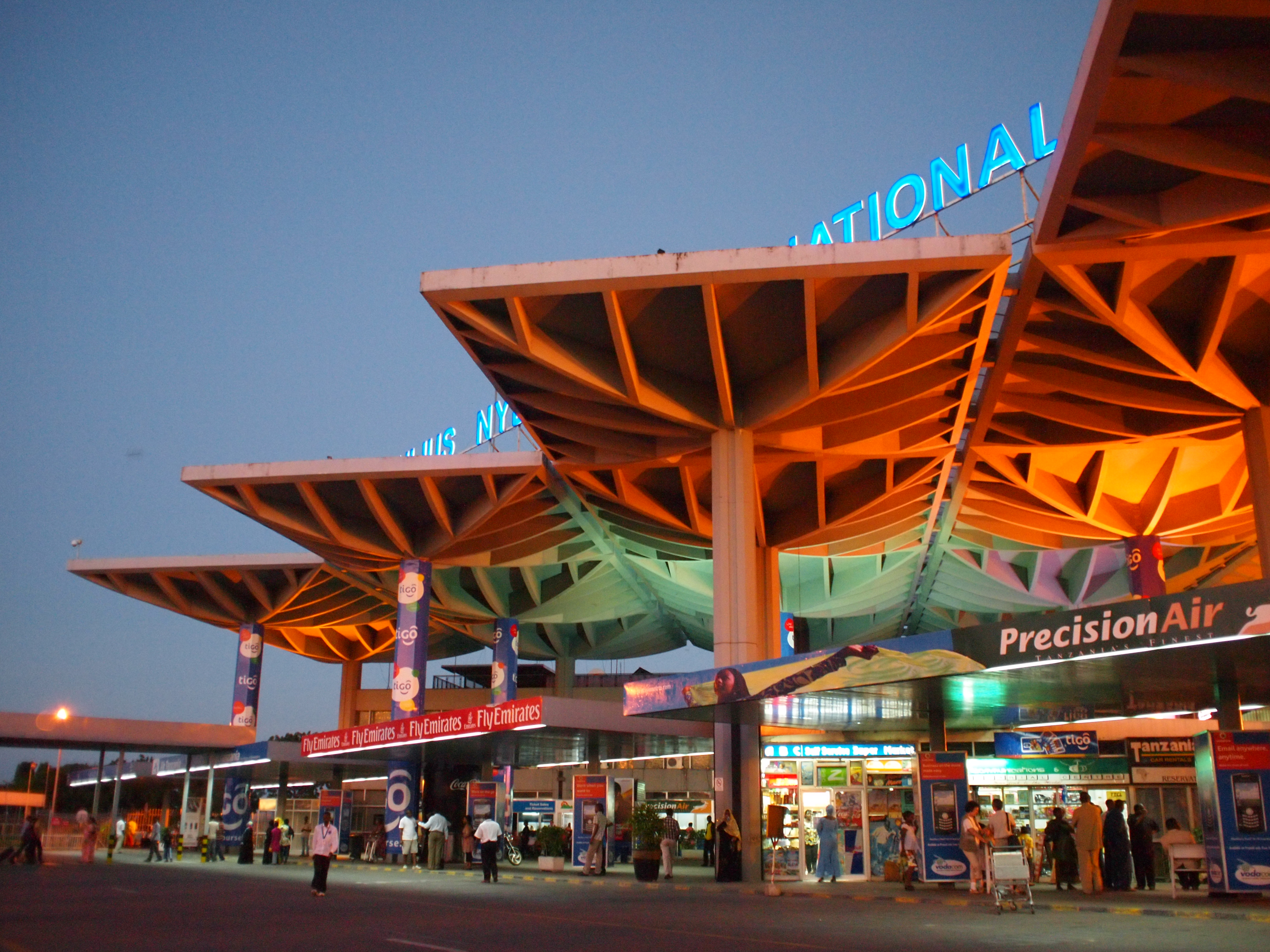
Julius Nyerere International Airport

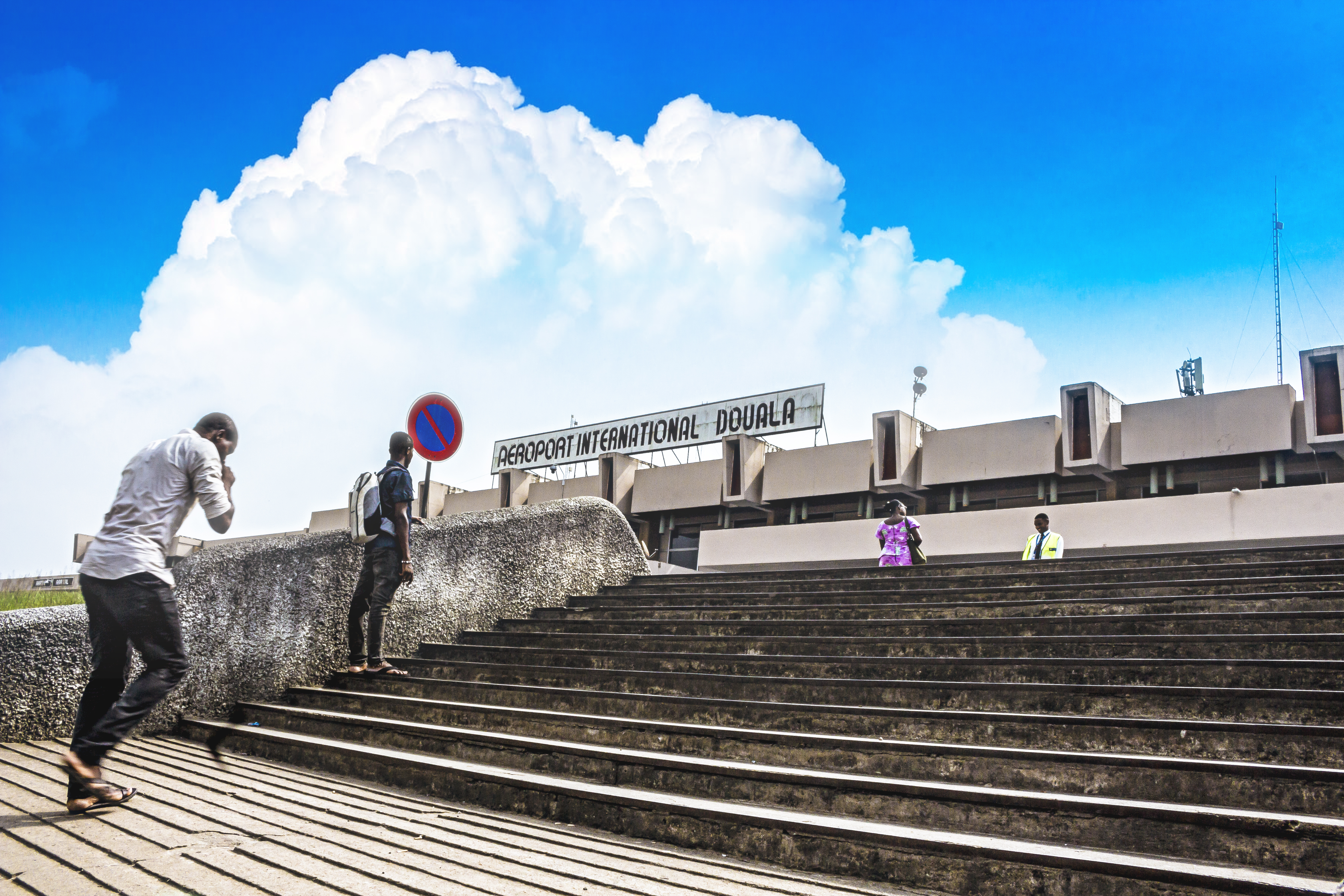
Douala International Airport

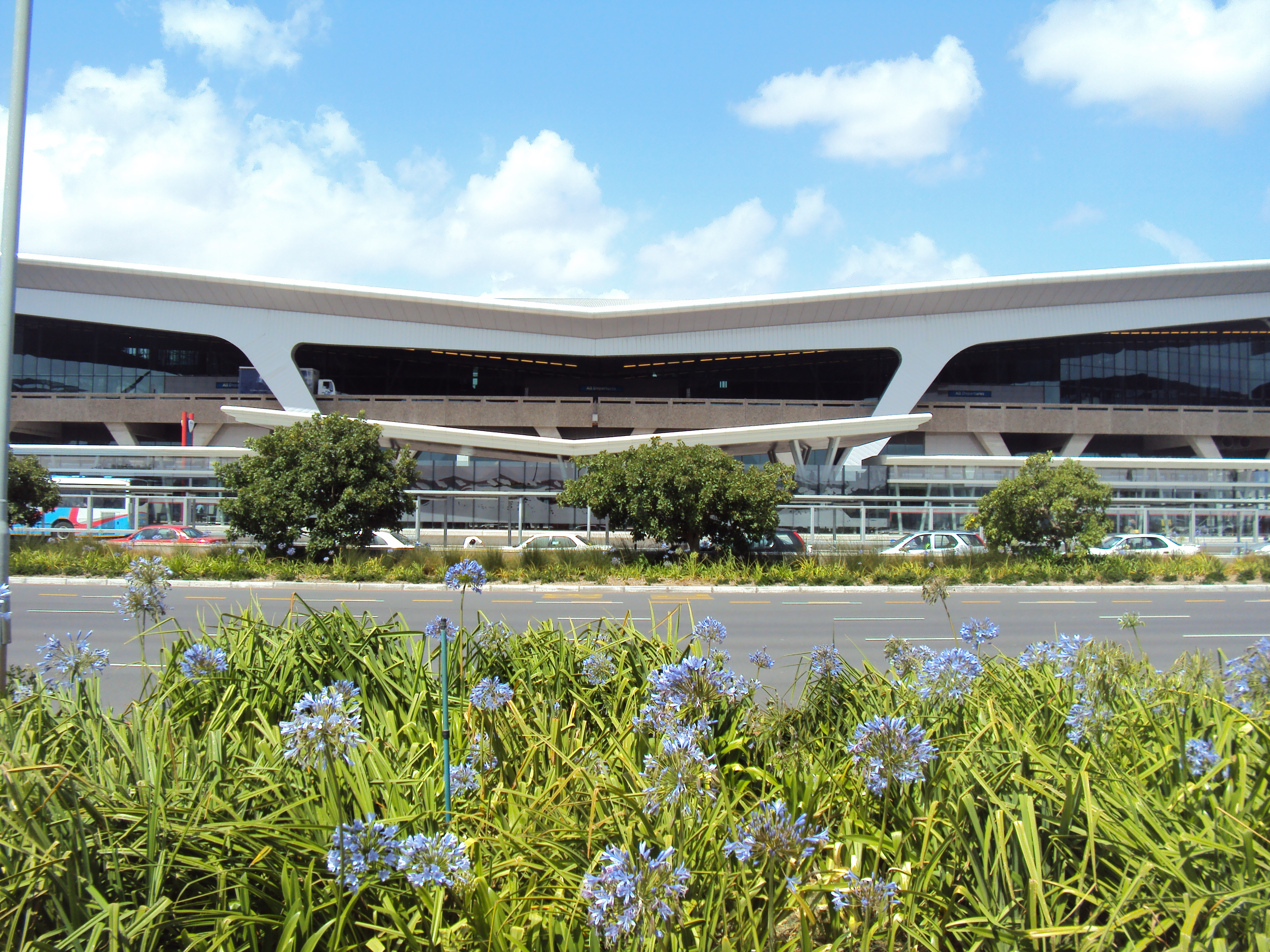
Cape Town International Airport

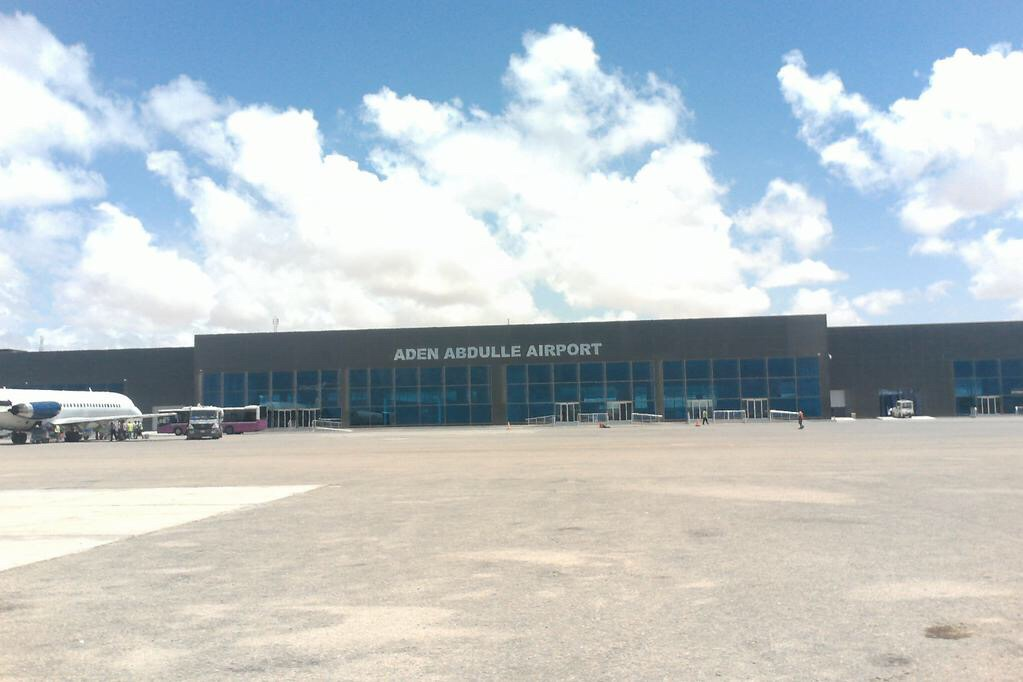
Aden Adde International Airport

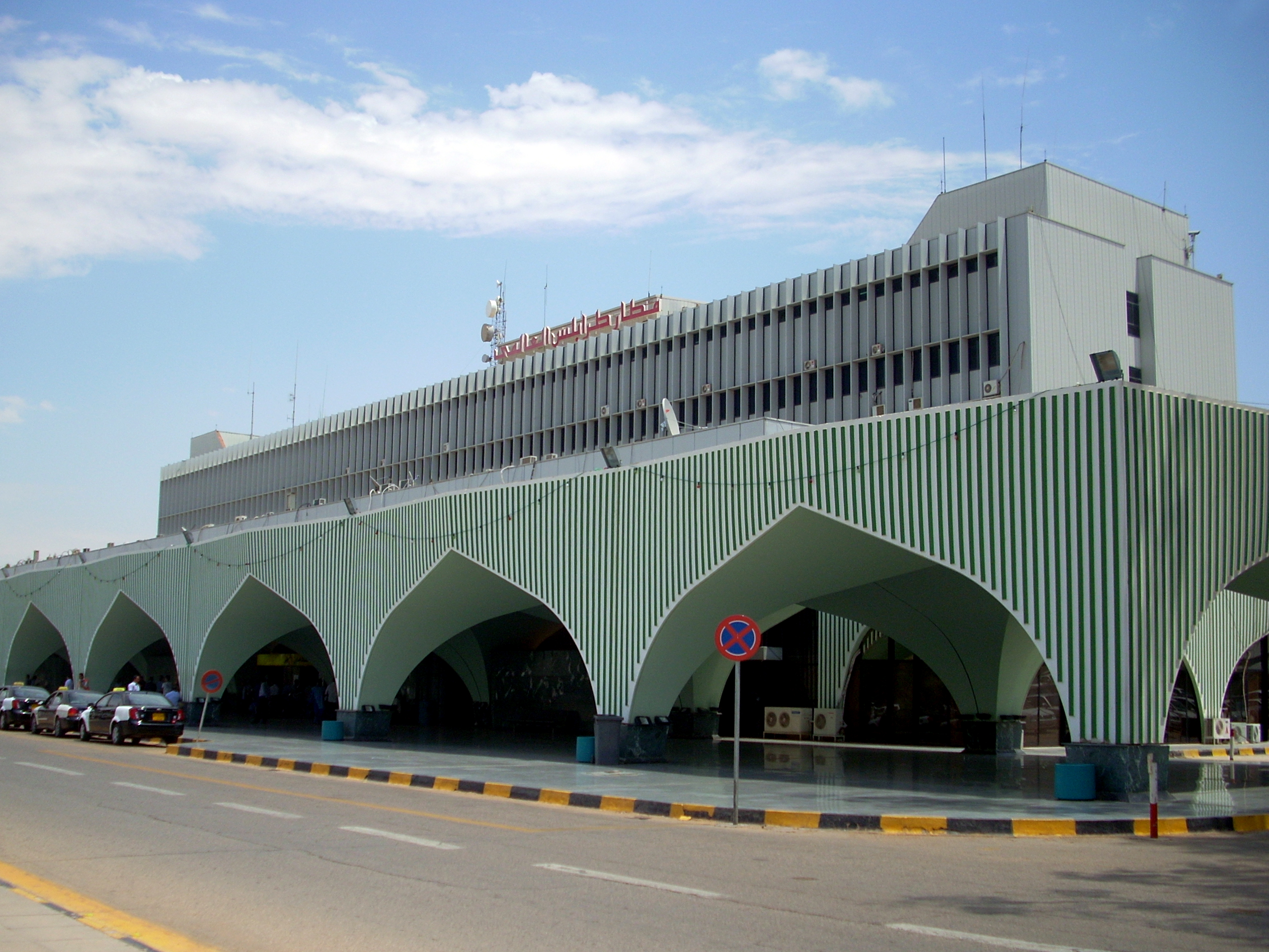
Tripoli International Airport

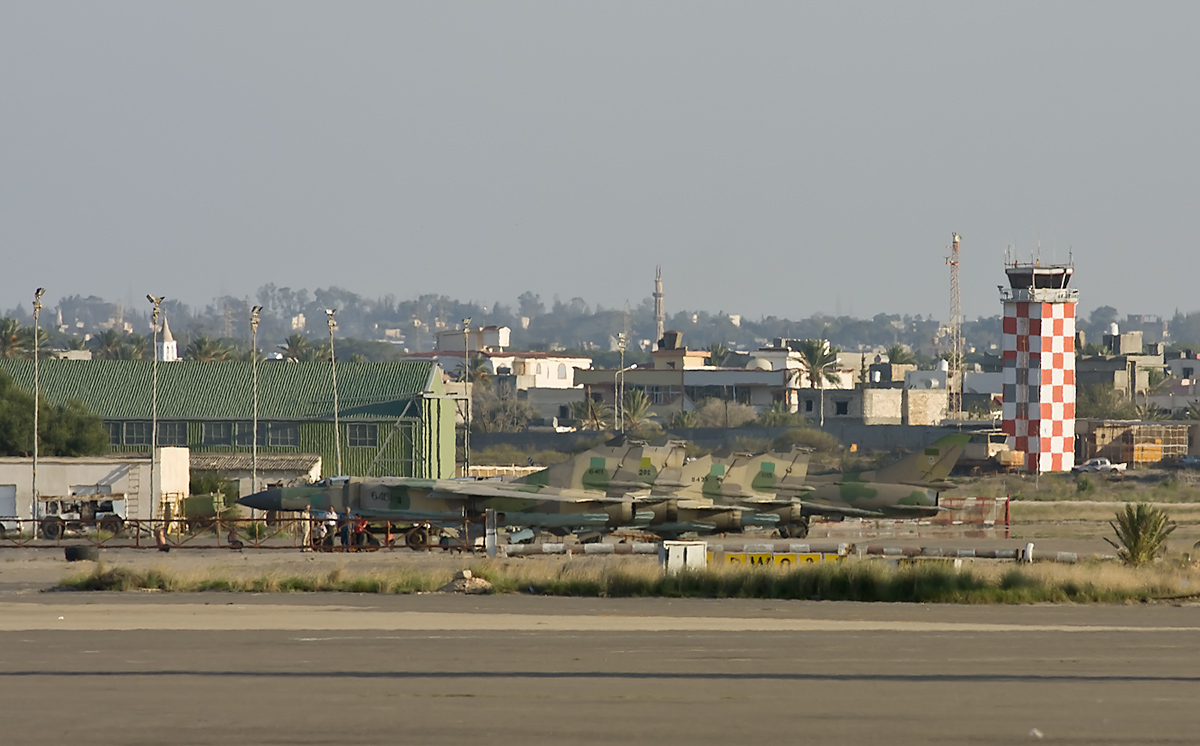
Mitiga International Airport

== See also ==
- Lists of airports in Africa
- List of the busiest airports in the Caribbean
- List of the busiest airports in Latin America
- List of the busiest airports in the Middle East
