= Benin–Burkina Faso border =

International border

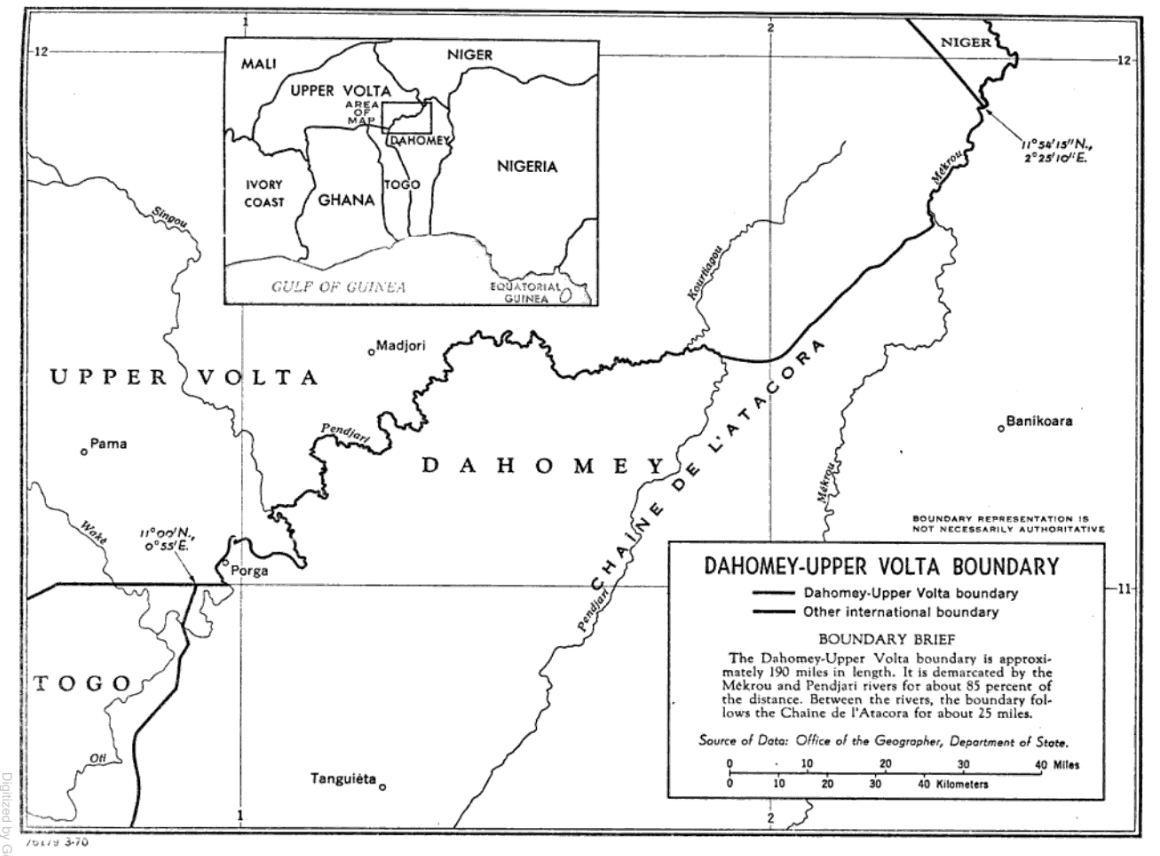
Benin-Burkina Faso border map

The Benin–Burkina Faso border is 386 km (240 mi) in length and runs from the tripoint with Togo in the southwest to the tripoint with Niger in the northeast.

== Description ==
The border starts at the Togolese tripoint, then proceeds briefly overland in a north-western direction, before reaching the Pendjari River, which it then follows for some distance. An overland section then connects up the Mékrou River, which forms the boundary up the tripoint with Niger. Virtually the entire boundary area is protected by various trans-border parks which together form the W-Arly-Pendjari Complex.

== History ==
During the second half of the 19th century France began creating small trading settlements on the West African coast. In 1851 a treaty of friendship was signed between France and the Kingdom of Dahomey in what is now southern Benin, followed by the creation of a protectorate in Porto Novo in 1863. The colony of Dahomey (the former name of Benin) was declared in 1894, and was later included within the much larger federal colony of French West Africa (Afrique occidentale française, abbreviated AOF) in 1899. The 1880s saw an intense competition between the European powers for territories in Africa, a process known as the Scramble for Africa; the process culminated in the Berlin Conference of 1884, in which the European nations concerned agreed upon their respective territorial claims and the rules of engagements going forward. As a result of this France gained control of the upper valley of the Niger River (roughly equivalent to the areas of modern Mali and Niger). France began occupying the area of modern Mali (then often referred to as French Sudan) and Burkina Faso (then called Upper Volta) during the 1880s-90s. This region was organised as Upper Senegal and Niger; various French decrees delimited a border between this colony and Dahomey during the period 1901–14. The colony of Upper Volta (modern Burkina Faso) was constituted in March 1919; the colony was abolished in 1932 and its territory divided between what Niger and Ivory Coast, but it was then reconstituted within its previous borders in 1947. The Dahomey-Upper Volta boundary was finalised by French statue on 27 October 1938.

As the movement for decolonisation grew in the post-Second World War era, France gradually granted more political rights and representation for its African territories, culminating in the granting of broad internal autonomy to each colony in 1958 within the framework of the French Community. Dahomey declared full independence on 1 August 1960, followed shortly thereafter by Upper Volta on 5 August, and their mutual frontier became an international boundary between two sovereign states.

Parts of the border remained contested on the ground, with several incidents in the disputed areas of Koalou and Niorgou sparking tension in the 2000s. As a result, the two countries signed an agreement in May 2009 which created a small neutral zone in the area, pending a final decision on the matter by the International Court of Justice.

In recent years the boundary region had been affected by the ongoing Islamist insurgency in the Sahel, predominantly on the Burkinabe side of the border. In May 2019 two French tourists exploring the Pendjari National Park were kidnapped and their Beninese guide killed. At present third-party governments generally advise against travelling in the border region.

== Settlements near the border ==
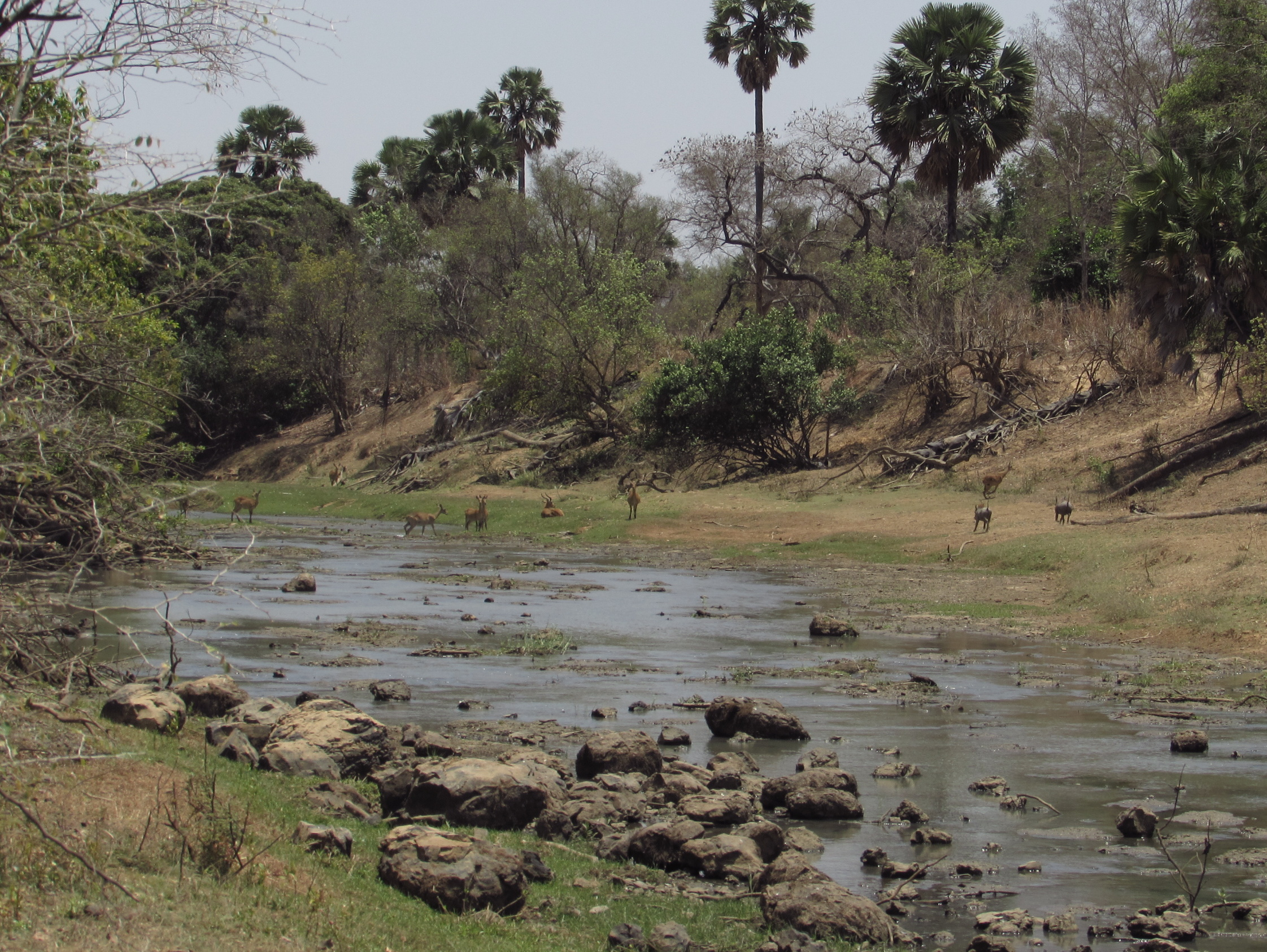
The Pendjari River in Pendjari National Park in the dry season; Benin left, Burkina Faso right

=== Benin ===
- Porga

=== Burkina Faso ===
- Momba
- Tanli
- Tanbarga
- Madjori

== Border crossings ==
The main border crossing is at Porga.

== See also ==
- Benin–Burkina Faso relations
