= Goure Airport =

Coordinates: 13.98360°N 10.27490°E

- IATA: none; ICAO: DRZG

Summary
- Airport type: Public
- Owner: Government
- Location: Goure, Niger
- Interactive map of Goure Airport

Goure Airport (ICAO: DRZG) is an airport serving the Commune and town of Goure in Zinder Region of southeastern Niger.

Goure airport is located 15 kilometres (9.3 mi) southwest of the city centre. Its runway is 1,510 metres (4,950 ft) by 50 metres (160 ft).
