= Akpaka Airport =

Airport in Atakpamé, Plateaux, Togo

- IATA: none; ICAO: DXAK

Summary
- Location: Atakpamé, Togo
- Elevation AMSL: 689 ft (210 m)
- Coordinates: 7°31′15″N 1°11′30″E

Map
- Location within Togo

Runways
Direction	Length		Surface
Direction	m	ft	Surface
06/24	900	2,953	Grass
- Source: GCM Google Maps

Akpaka Airport (ICAO: DXAK) is an airport serving Atakpamé, the capital city of the Plateaux Region in Togo.

== Facilities ==
The airport resides at an elevation of 689 feet (210 m) above mean sea level. It has one runway 900 metres (2,953 ft) in length.
