= Gaya Airport (Niger) =

Airport in Niger

- IATA: none; ICAO: DRRG

Summary
- Airport type: Public
- Serves: Gaya
- Elevation AMSL: 662 ft / 202 m
- Coordinates: 11°53′20″N 3°25′40″E

Map
- Location of the airport in Niger

Runways
Direction	Length		Surface
Direction	ft	m	Surface
06/24	4,530	1,380	Dirt
- Source: Google Maps

Gaya Airport (ICAO: DRRG) is an airport serving Gaya, Dosso Region, Niger, near the country's borders with Benin and Nigeria. It is located 2 kilometres (1.2 mi) west of the city centre.

== See also ==
- Transport in Niger
