= Bembereke Airport =

Airport in Borgou, Benin

Bembéréké Airport
- IATA: none; ICAO: DBBR

Summary
- Airport type: Public
- Serves: Bembéréké
- Location: Benin
- Elevation AMSL: 1,188 ft / 362 m
- Coordinates: 10°16′23.0″N 2°41′45.1″E

Map
- Location of Bembéréké Airport in Benin

Runways
Direction	Length		Surface
Direction	m	ft	Surface
05/23	741	2,430	GRASS
- Source: Landings.com

Bembéréké Airport (ICAO: DBBR), also spelled as Bembèrèkè Airport, is a public use airport located 4 km northeast of Bembéréké, Borgou, Benin.
