= Dosso Airport =

Coordinates: 13.04812°N 3.22097°E

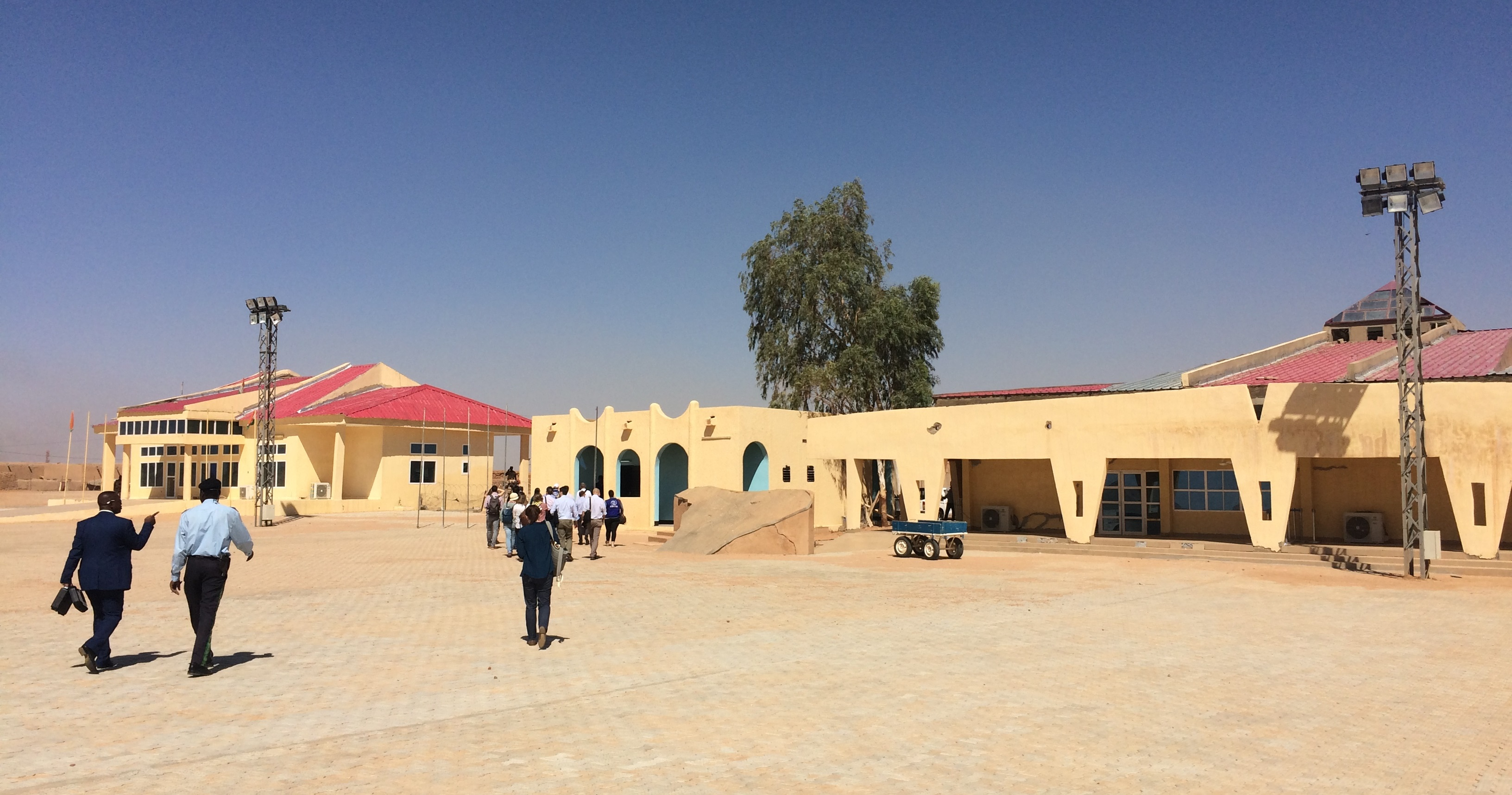
- The airport terminal buildings at Mano Dayak International Airport, Agadez, Niger.
- IATA: none; ICAO: DRRD

Summary
- Airport type: Public
- Owner: Government
- Location: Dosso, Niger
- Interactive map of Dosso Airport

Dosso Airport (ICAO: DRRD) is an airport serving Dosso in Niger.
