= La Tapoa =

- Village
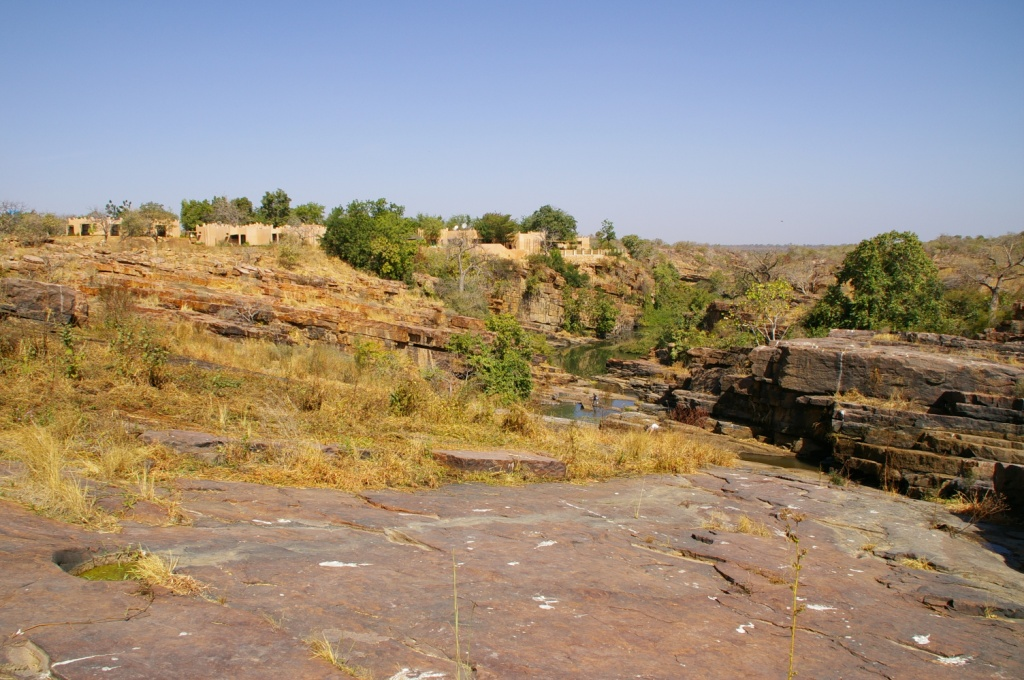
- A view of W National Park, with La Tapoa in the background, 2006.
- Country: Niger
- Region: Tillabéri Region

Population
  - Total: 126
- Time zone: UTC+1 (WAT)

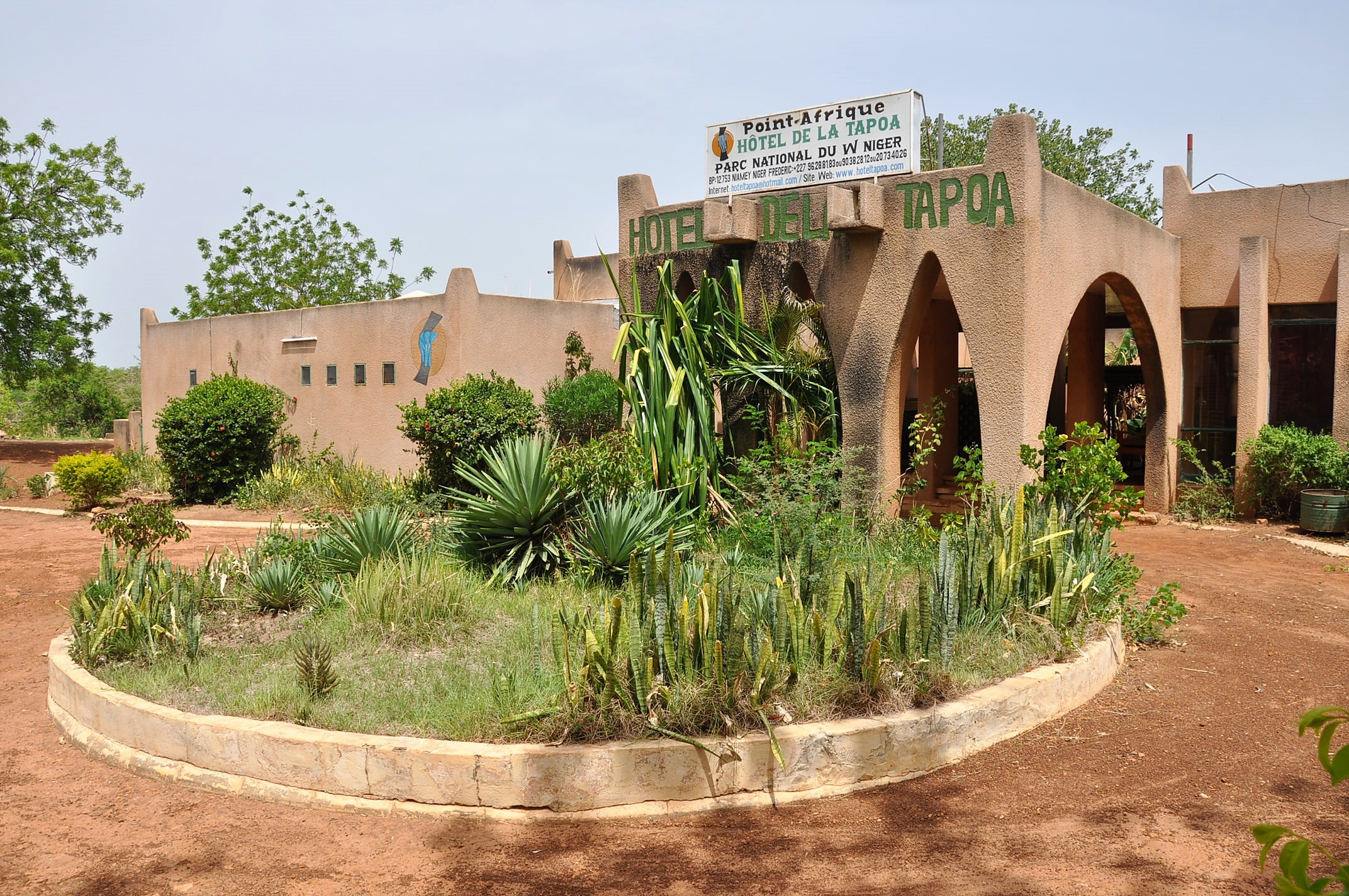
The 35-room hotel of La Tapoa, 2018.

La Tapoa is a village on the Niger River in the Tillabéri Region of south-western Niger. Originally it was a simple camping, but a 35-room hotel was built there;and now it is the starting point for excursions to the nearby W National Park.

== Transport ==
The village is served by La Tapoa Airport.

== Tourist attractions ==
La Tapoa is the starting point for excursions to the W National Park. You can rest in La Tapoa's 35-room hotel, that was purposely made for tourists that wanted to explore the W National Park.

== Population ==
It has a total population of 126 people according to the 2012 census.

== Status ==
It is considered a village.

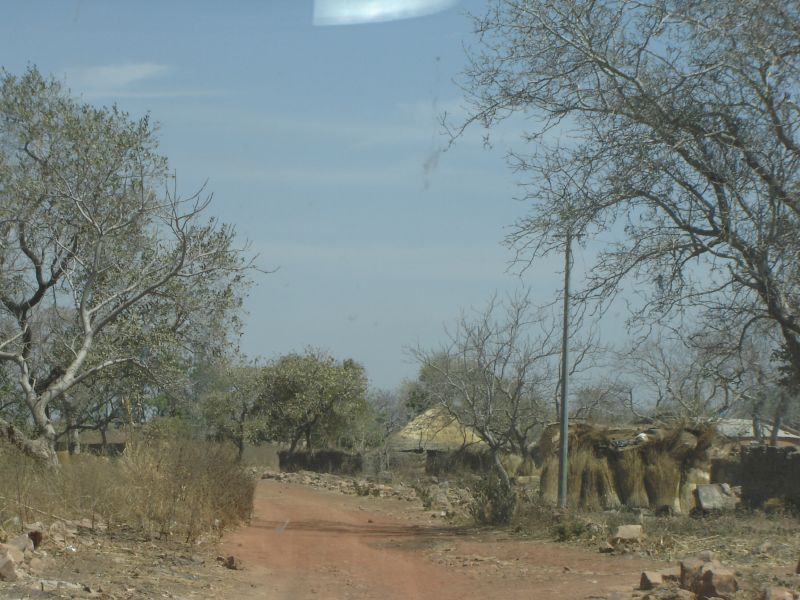
View of the main road of La Tapoa, 2007.
