= Kolokope Airport =

- IATA: none; ICAO: DXKP

Summary
- Location: Anié, Togo
- Elevation AMSL: 591 ft (180 m)
- Coordinates: 7°48′N 1°17′E

Map
- Location within Togo

Runways
Direction	Length		Surface
Direction	m	ft	Surface
	800	2,625

Kolokope Airport (ICAO: DXKP) is an airport serving Anié, located in the Plateaux region in Togo.

== Facilities ==
The airport resides at an elevation of 591 feet (180 m) above mean sea level. It has one runways which is 800 metres (2,625 ft) in length.
