= Ouallam Airport =

Airport in Niger

- IATA: none; ICAO: DRRU

Summary
- Airport type: Public
- Serves: Ouallam
- Elevation AMSL: 892 ft / 272 m
- Coordinates: 14°21′20″N 2°04′10″E

Map
- Location of the airport in Niger

Runways
Direction	Length		Surface
Direction	ft	m	Surface
05/23	3,610	1,100	Dirt
- Source: Google Maps

Ouallam Airport (ICAO: DRRU) is an airport serving Ouallam, in southwestern Niger. The airport is located on a mesa 5 kilometres (3 mi) north of the town.

== See also ==
- Transport in Niger
