= La Tapoa Airport =

Coordinates: 12.48300°N 2.40000°E

- IATA: none; ICAO: DRRP

Summary
- Airport type: Public
- Owner: Government
- Location: La Tapoa, Niger
- Interactive map of La Tapoa Airport

La Tapoa Airport (ICAO: DRRP) is an airport serving the town of La Tapoa in the Tillabéri Region of southwestern Niger.

The airport is 3 kilometres (1.9 mi) from the area's campsite/campground. Its runway is 1,200 metres (3,900 ft) by 25 metres (82 ft).
