= Porga Airport =

Airport in Atakora, Benin

- IATA: none; ICAO: DBBO

Summary
- Airport type: Public
- Serves: Porga
- Location: Benin
- Elevation AMSL: 162 m / 531 ft
- Coordinates: 11°2′48.3″N 0°59′35.8″E

Map
- Location of Porga Airport in Benin

Runways
Direction	Length		Surface
Direction	m	ft	Surface
05/23	2,051	6,730	GRASS
- Source: Landings.com

Porga Airport (ICAO: DBBO) is a public use airport located near Porga, Atakora, Benin.
