= List of airports by ICAO code: E =

Due to the size of this list, it has been split into two lists:

- List of airports by ICAO code: EB-EG
- List of airports by ICAO code: EH-EY
