= Tillabéri Airport =

Airport in Niger

Tillabery Airport
- IATA: none; ICAO: DRRL

Summary
- Airport type: Public
- Serves: Tillabery
- Elevation AMSL: 692 ft (211 m)
- Coordinates: 14°12′10″N 1°28′25″E

Map
- Location of the airport in Niger

Runways
Direction	Length		Surface
Direction	ft	m	Surface
07/25	3,950	1,205	Unpaved
- Source: Google Maps

Tillabery Airport (ICAO: DRRL) is an airport serving Tillabery, in the extreme west of Niger.

== See also ==
- Transport in Niger
