= Tessaoua Airport =

Airport in Niger

Coordinates: 13.76700°N 8.01700°E

- IATA: none; ICAO: DRRA

Summary
- Airport type: Public
- Owner: Government
- Location: Tessaoua, Niger
- Interactive map of Tessaoua Airport

Tessaoua Airport (ICAO: DRRA) is an airport serving Tessaoua in Niger.

It is 4 kilometres (2.5 mi) east of the city centre. Its runway is 1,200 metres (3,900 ft) by 25 metres (82 ft).
