= Porga, Benin =

Town in the Atakora Department of Benin

Coordinates: 11°03′N 0°58′E

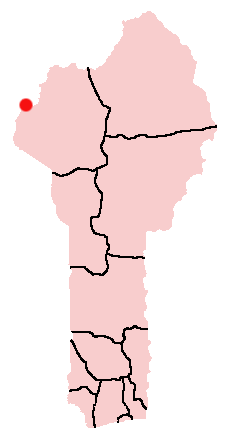
Location of Porga in Benin

Porga is a town located in the Atakora Department of Benin.

The Porga Airport serves Porga.

== History ==
On December 1-2, 2021, a group of militants, possibly from Burkina Faso, attacked a border security post in Porga, killing two soldiers. This was the second such attack in the country that week (The first occurred in Alibori).
