= List of airports by ICAO code: K =

The prefix K is generally reserved for the contiguous United States. The ICAO codes for these airports are usually the FAA location identifier prefixed with a K. IATA codes are listed where applicable. Cities shown are those associated with the airport as per the FAA, this may not always be the exact location as airports are often located in smaller towns outside the cities they serve.

Also see airport category and list.

Due to the size of this list, it has been split into three lists:

- List of airports by ICAO code: KA-KH
- List of airports by ICAO code: KI-KP
- List of airports by ICAO code: KR-KZ
