= Taparko =

- Interactive map of Taparko
- Coordinates: 13.4866581°N 0.3284888°W
- Country: Burkina Faso
- Region: Centre-Nord
- Province: Namentenga

Population
  - Total: 3,316
- 2006

Taparko is a locality located in the Yalgo department of the Namentenga province in the Centre-Nord region of Burkina Faso.

== Geography ==
Taparko is located about 12 km southwest of the center of Yalgo, the capital of the department. The commune is at the junction of National Road 3 and the end of National Road 18 going from Taparko to Manni then Bogandé and Fada N'Gourma.

== Economy ==
The economy of Taparko, historically agro-pastoral, was profoundly changed with the opening in 2008 of the open-pit gold mine operated by the Russian company Nordgold– with however insufficient benefits for the village population, particularly in terms of jobs – but whose production has been tending towards the end since 2019.

== Education and health ==
Taparko hosts a health and social promotion center (CSPS) while the medical center (CM) is in Tougouri and the medical center with surgical antenna (CMA) of the province is in Boulsa.
