= Art of Burkina Faso =

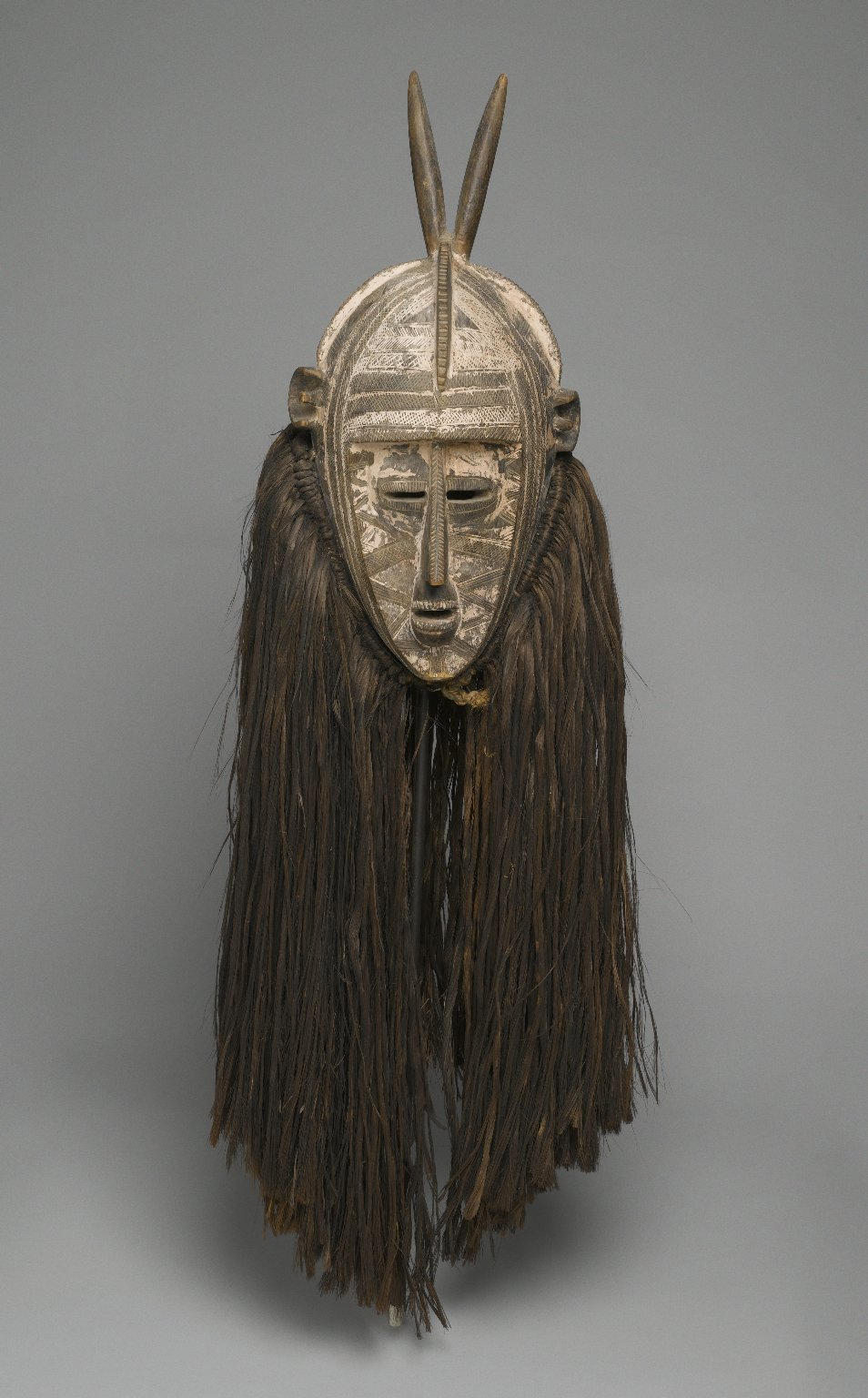
Wood mask, features rather stylistically carved with protruding mouth and eyes, long straight nose, two horns on top of head. Entire front surface covered with fine geometric incised designs. Remains of pinkish substance on facial surface. Black fiber mantle sewn around bottom of mask. According to Bobo beliefs, the god Wuro created the world and then appointed his son, Dwo, to assist humanity. All Bobo masks serve as a means of contact between human beings and these deities; some represent the deities themselves while others, called bolo masks, depict animals and people. Bolo masks such as this one are usually danced for entertainment

The art of Burkina Faso is the product of a rich cultural history. Many of the ancient artistic traditions for which Africa is so well known have been preserved in Burkina Faso because so many people continue to honor the ancestral spirits, and the spirits of nature. In great part they honor the spirits through the use of masks and carved figures. Many of the countries to the north of Burkina Faso had become predominantly Muslim, while many of the countries to the south of Burkina Faso are heavily Christian. In contrast many of the people of Burkina Faso continue to offer prayers and sacrifices to the spirits of nature and to the spirits of their ancestors. The result is that they continue to use the sorts of art that we see in museums in Europe and America.

One of the principal obstacles to understanding the art of Burkina Faso, including that of the Bwa, has been a confusion between the styles of the Bwa, "gurunsi", and Mossi, and a confusion of the Bwa people with their neighbors to the west the Bobo people. This confusion was the result of the use by French colonial officers of Jula interpreters at the turn of the century. These interpreters considered the two peoples to be the same and so referred to the Bobo as "Bobo-Fing" and to the Bwa as "Bobo-Oule." In fact, these two peoples are not related at all. Their languages are quite different, their social systems are quite different, and certainly their art is quite different. In terms of artistic styles the confusion stems from the fact that the Bwa, "gurunsi'" and Mossi make masks that are covered with red white and black geometric graphic patterns. This is simply the style of the Voltaic or Gur peoples, and also includes the Dogon and other peoples who speak Voltaic languages.

Burkina Faso's contemporary art scene developed with policy support for the arts beginning post-independence in the 1980s. Several institutional initiatives support local artists, supported by the government through the Ministry of Culture, Arts, and Tourism.

== Mossi masks ==
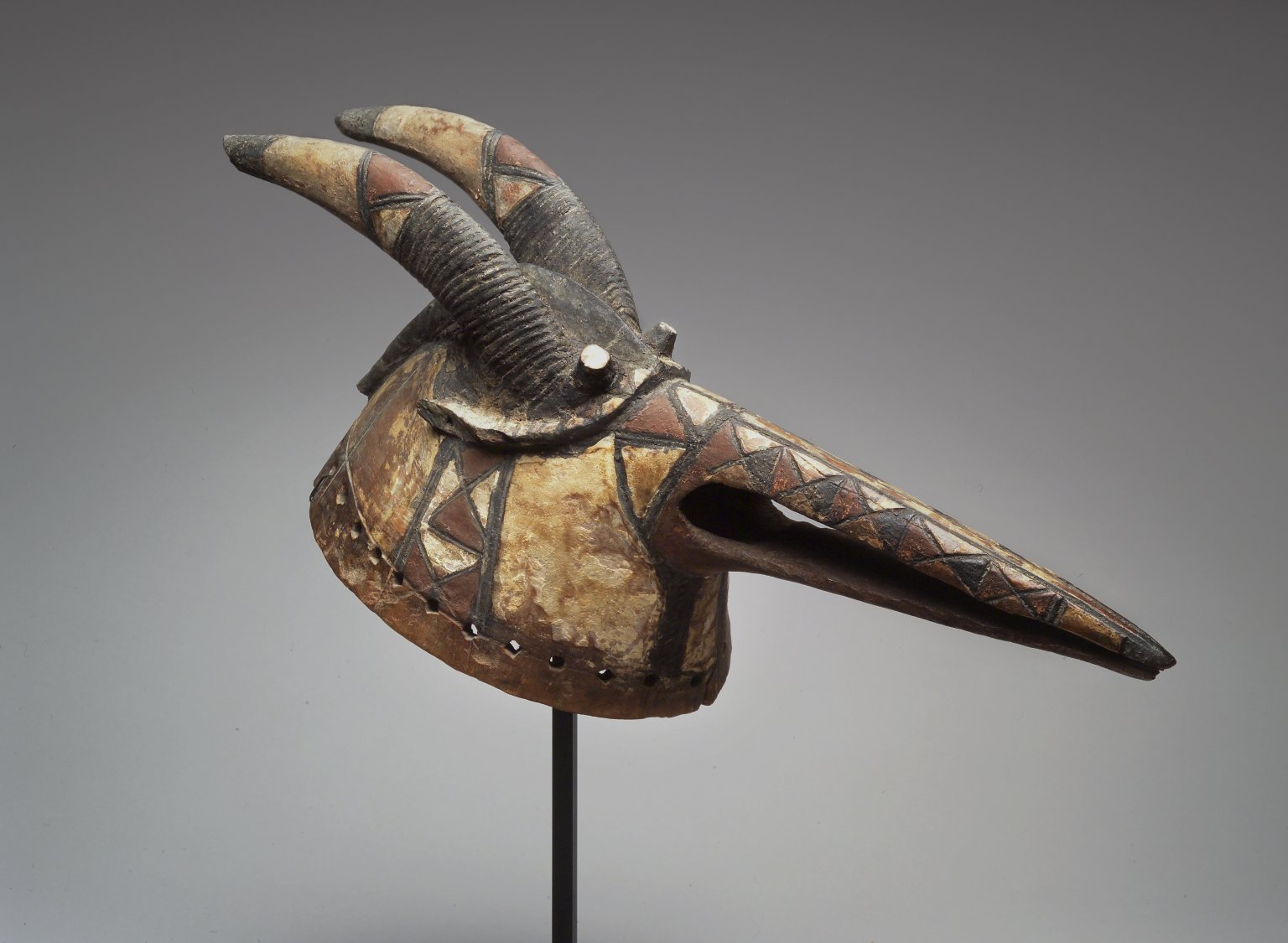
Mossi Mask, late 19th or early 20th century. Brooklyn Museum

Masks occupy an important position in the religious life of the Nyonyose, the ancient farmers and spiritual segment of society among the Mossi people. The Nakomse (chief class) do not use masks. The use of masks in initiations and funerals is quite typical of all the Voltaic or Gur-speaking peoples, including the Nyonyose, Lela, Winiama, Nouna, Bwaba, and Dogon. Masks appear at burials to observe on behalf of the ancestors that proper burial procedures were carried out. They then appear at several funeral or memorial services held at regular intervals over the years after an elder has died. Masks attend to honor the deceased and to verify that the spirit of the deceased merits admission into the world of ancestors. Without a proper funeral the spirit remains near the home and causes trouble for his/her descendants. Masks are often carved of the wood of Ceiba pentandra, the faux kapokier. They are carved in three major styles that correspond to the styles of the ancient people who were conquered in 1500 by the invading Nakomse and integrated into a new Mossi society: In the north masks are vertical planks with a round concave or convex face.

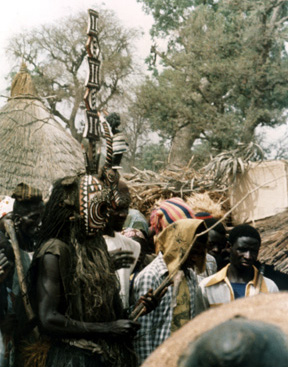
A mask at a funeral in the village of Kirsi in 1976. A black plastic child's doll has been added to the horns to create a karan wemba, to honor a female ancestor.

In the southwest masks represent animals such as antelope, bush buffalo, and various strange creatures, are painted red, white and black. In the east, around Boulsa, masks have tall posts above the face to which fiber is attached.

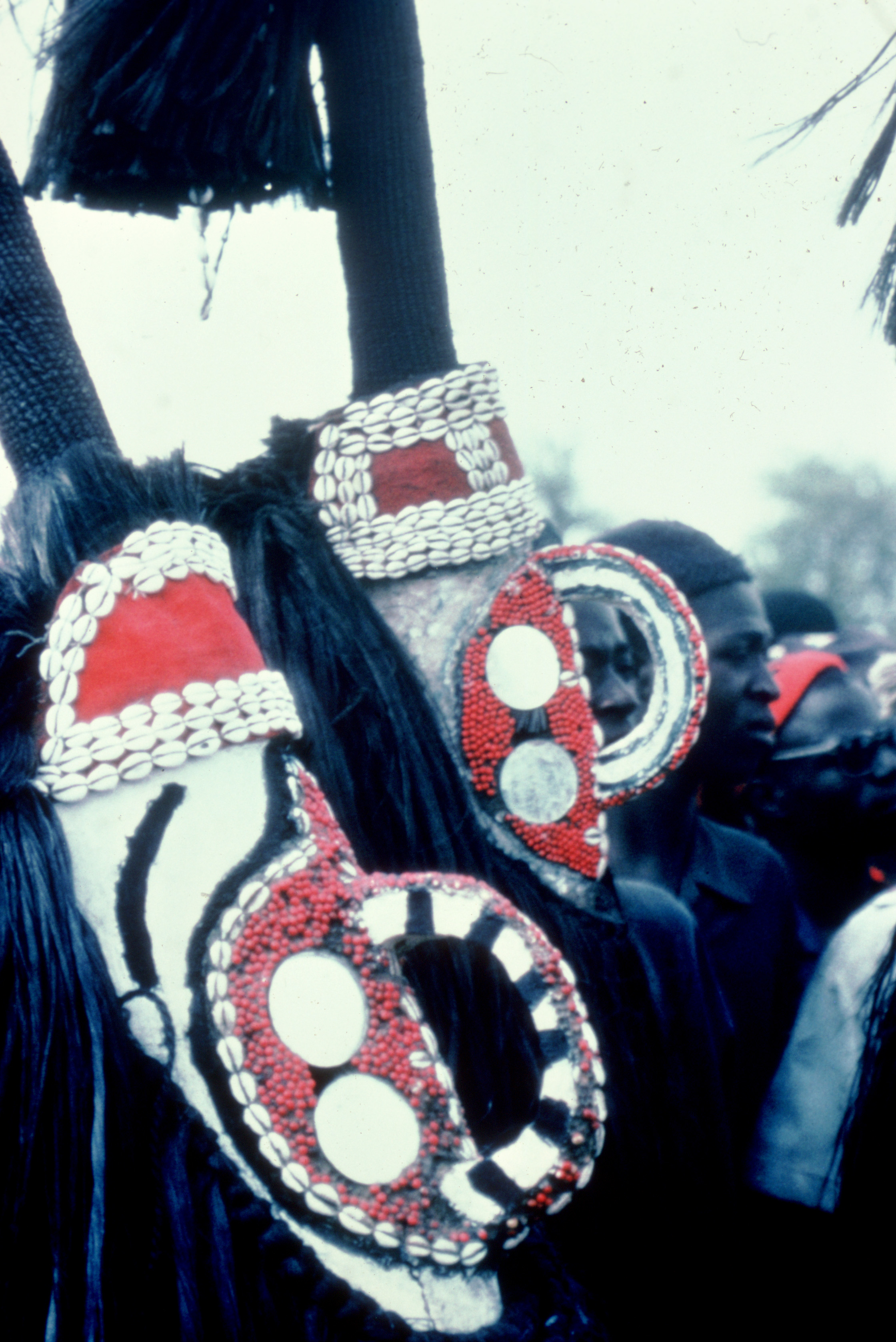
Two female Mossi masks of the eastern style at a year-end ceremony in the village of Zegedeguin.

Female masks have two pairs of round mirrors for eyes, and small masks, representing Yali, "the child" have two vertical horns. All Nyonyose masks are worn with thick costumes made of the fiber of the wild hemp, Hibiscus cannabinus. In the old days, only the northern Nyonyose in Yatenga and Kaya, and the eastern people around Boulsa allowed their masks to be photographed. The people in the southwest forbade photography because it did not conform to the "yaaba soore", the path of the ancestors. Mask characters include Balinga, the Fulani woman, katre, the hyena, nyaka, the small antelope, Wan pelega, the large antelope, and many others. Now, however, masks from all three areas appear at annual public festivals such festivals as SIAO (Fr. Salon international de l’Artisanat de Ouagadougou), Week of the Culture, and the Atypical Nights of Koudougou (Les Nuits Atypiques de Koudougou). Each Nyonyose family has its own mask, and they are charged with protecting the masks to this day. Masks are very sacred, and are a link to the spirits of ancestors and of nature.

== Bwa ==
The Bwa people live in central Burkina Faso. in years past they have been associated erroneously with the Bobo. In fact they are not related to the Bobo at all, and their languages and culture are quite different. The Bwa people speak a language in the voltaic family of languages, while the Bobo speak a language in the Mande family. The confusion was caused in the past by the inability of the French to distinguish between the two people through their Jula interpreters.

The Bwa produce several different kinds of masks, including leaf masks dedicated to the god named Dwo, and wooden masks dedicated to the god Lanle.

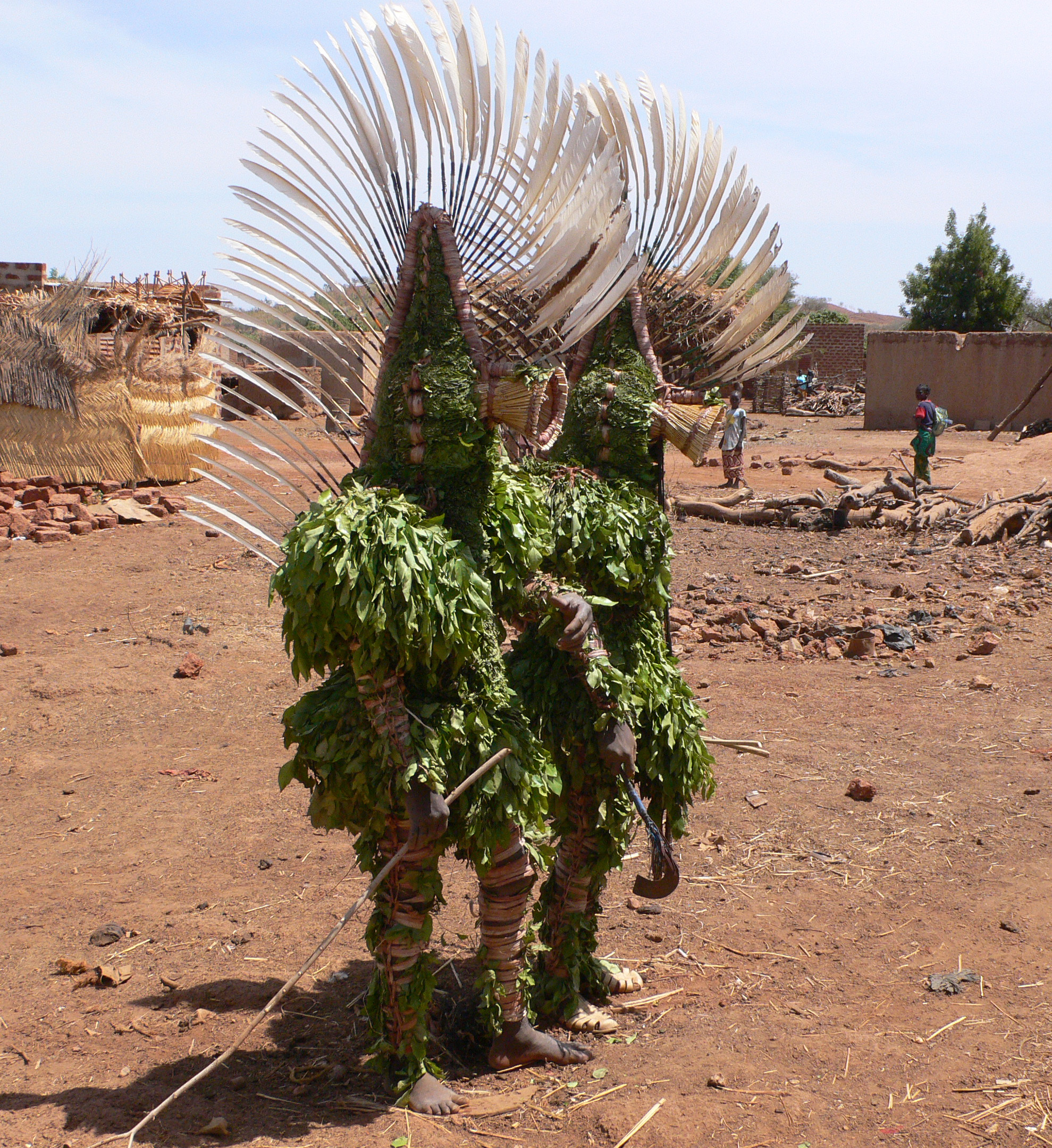
Leaf masks, Bwa village of Boni, 2006

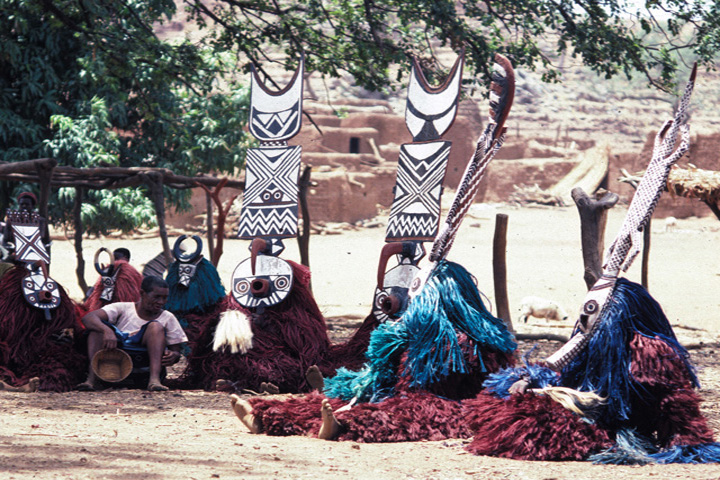
Bwa masks, village of Dossi, 1985

The style of the Bwa is well known to collectors and scholars around the world. These are wooden masks that represent animals, or tall broad plank masks that represent the spirit Lanle. They are covered with red white and black graphic patterns that represent the religious laws that people in the villages must obey if they are to receive God's blessings. These well-known patterns are not decorative, they are graphic patterns in a system of writing that can be read by anyone in the community who has been initiated. They include black-and-white checkerboards, that look like a target, zig-zag patterns that represent the path of the ancestors, X patterns, and crescents.

Masks are used in a variety of different contexts. They appear at funerals of senior elders both male and female. They appear at initiations when young men and women are taught the meanings of the masks and the importance of the spirits and enter adult village society. They even appear on market days when their performances attract visitors to the local market, where they are likely to spend more cash, plus helping the economy of the community.

== Winiama ==
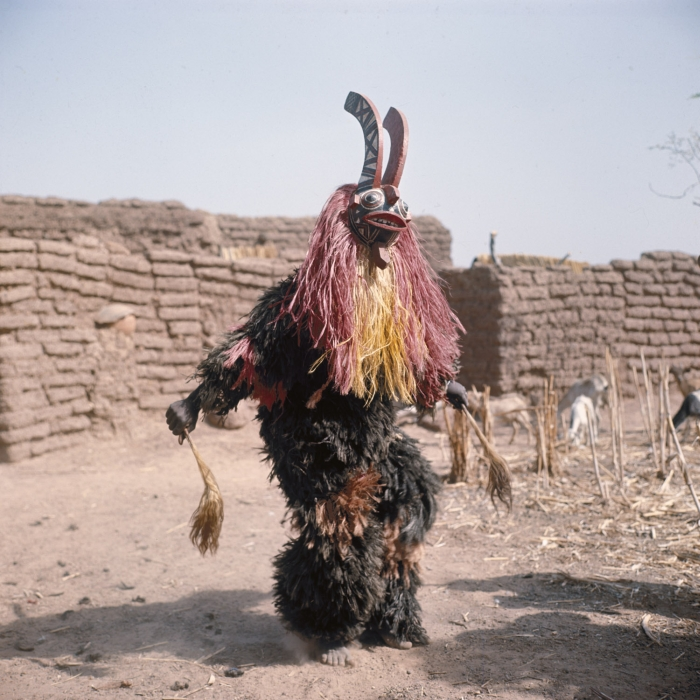
A Winiama masked dancer

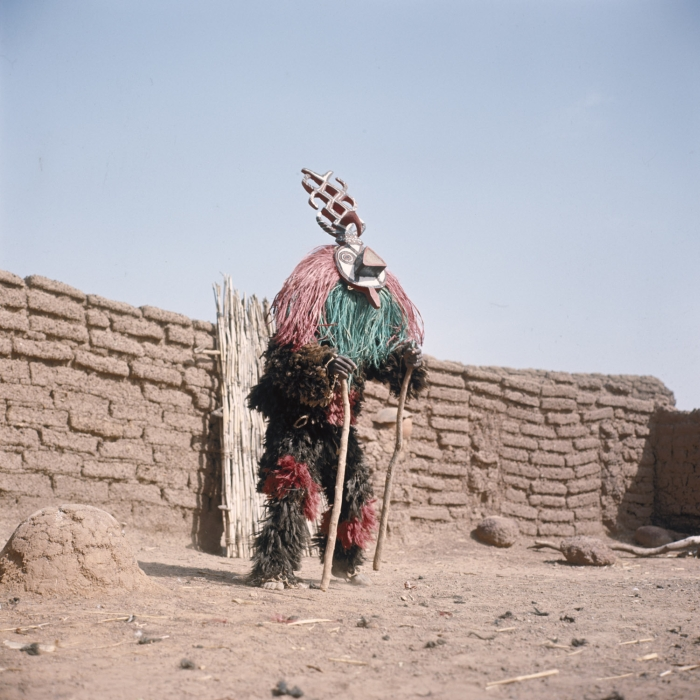
A masked Winiama dancer

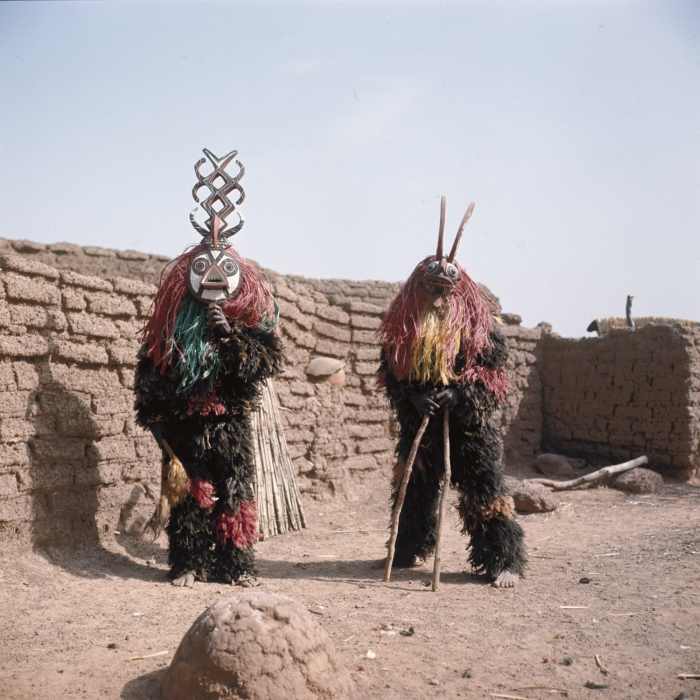
Two Winiama masked dancers

The region southwest of the Mossi Plateau is occupied by a number of autochthonous farmer groups that are referred to collectively by the Mossi, and in most studies, as gurunsi. The singular, gurunga, indicates that the word is of Moré origin (a word of the Moré "-ga, -se" class). The people that comprise the so-called Gurunsi peoples include the Nuna, Nunuma, Léla, Winiama, Sisala, Kaséna, Nankana, and Kusasé who share similar Gur languages. The Léla speak Lélé, the Nuna speak Nuni, the Winiama speak Winien, and the Kaséna speak Kasem. Most peoples in the area consider gurunsi a pejorative form of address, and much prefer to be called by their ethnic name.

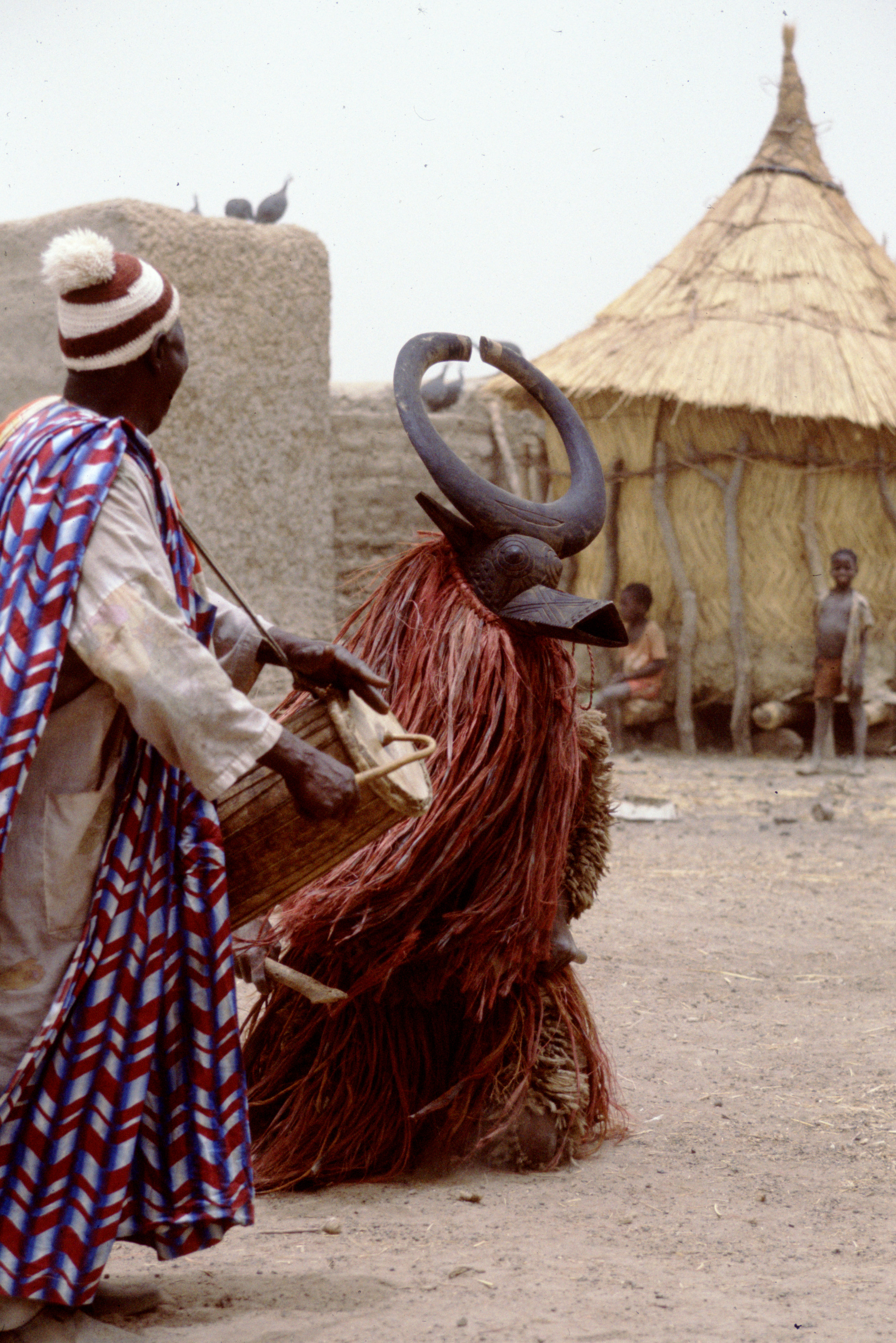
Bush buffalo mask of the Ivo family, village of Ouri, 1985

The major producers of masks are the Léla, Nunuma, and Winiama in the north, and the Nuna in the south. The Sisala also once used masks, but they have virtually disappeared. The Léla, Nunuma, Winiama and Nuna have influenced the styles, use and meaning of masks among their Bwa and Mossi neighbors. Masks carved of wood represent bush spirits, or spirits that take animal forms. These animal forms may be more naturalistic among the Nunuma and Nuna or more stylized among the Léla and Winiama. The animals that occur most frequently are the antelope, buffalo, bush pig, hornbill, hyena, and the serpent. Some masks represent spirits that have no recognizable animal form. Whatever type is represented, masks have large round eyes surrounded by concentric circles, a short snout for animal masks, or a large, protuberant mouth for supernatural spirits. They are covered with geometric patterns painted red, white, and black, repainted every year, except among the Winiama. Some masks are surmounted by a tall plank.

Masks represent protective spirits that can take animal forms or can appear as strange beings. These spirits watch over a family, clan or community, and, if the rules for their propitiation are followed correctly, provide for the fertility, health, and prosperity of the owners. Thus the masks provide for the continuity of life in the gurunsi world. Almost any unusual event can justify consultations with a diviner and the carving of a mask to represent the spirit that is responsible. When the owner of a mask dies the mask may be passed on to his son, or it may be retired to the lineage spirit house where it slowly decays. Years later a diviner may prescribe a new mask in the same form, and the old mask is taken to the local smith who produces a replacement. Then, such old masks often are sold on the antiquities market. Masks appear at numerous events throughout the dry season. They dance to drive evil forces away from the community. They participate in the funerals of male and female elders. Every three, five, or seven years, the most sacred masks of the community participate, including young men's initiations and every seven years in sacrifices to ensure the well-being of the village. Masks may appear for special reasons throughout the year. Entertainment masks appear on almost every market day to dance for the crowds of visitors. The sacred wankr masks do not appear at such popular, public performances.

== Lobi ==
The Lobi people live in southwestern Burkina Faso and northern Ivory Coast and Ghana. They are extremely resistant to any sort of centralized political authority. Instead their communities are based on the laws of God. The central character in every Lobi community is the religious specialist named the Thildar.

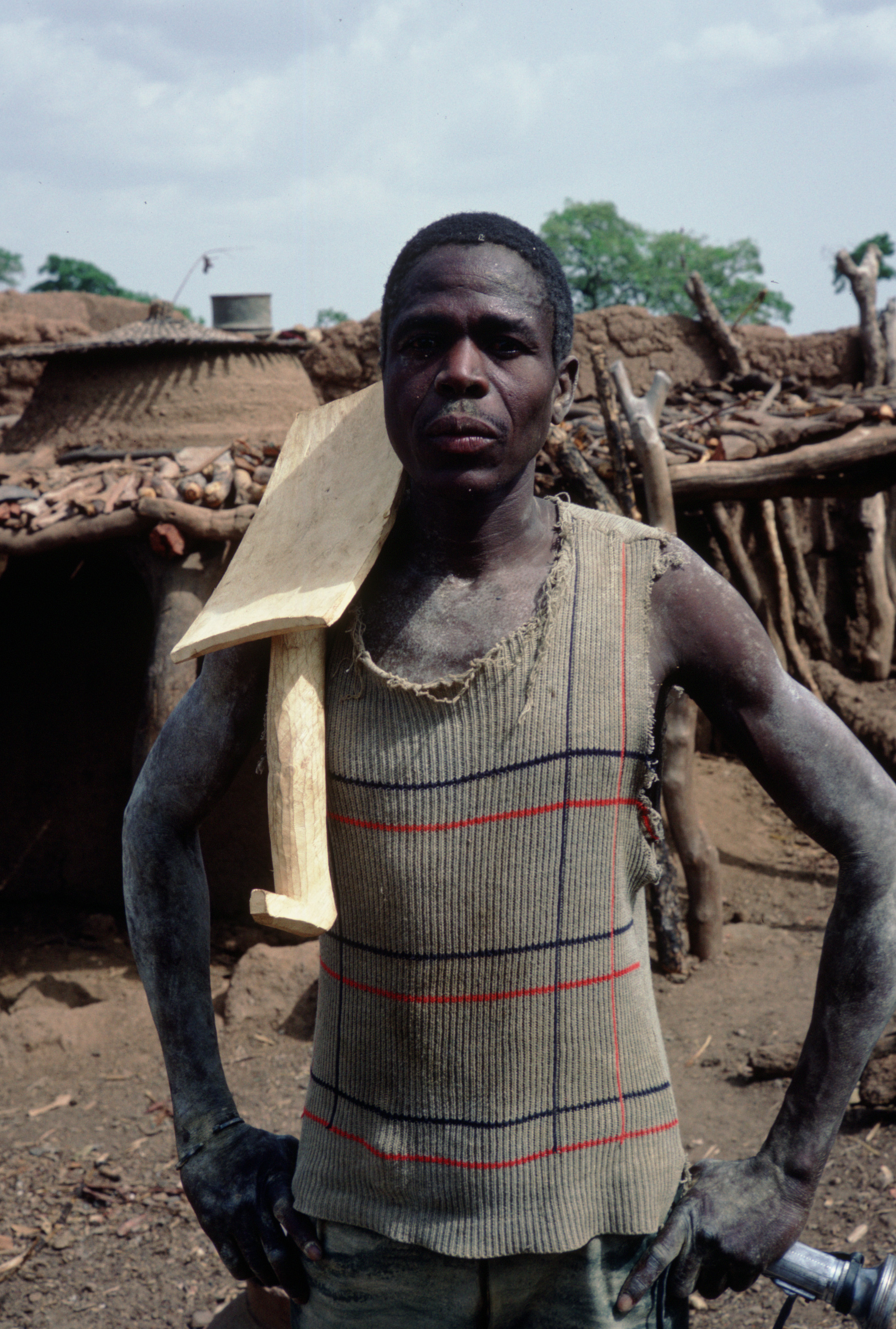
Lobi artist with a carved stool, 1984

This diviner is responsible for communication with the spirits that govern the community and protect members of each family from accidents, disease, violence, and all of the multiple threats people encounter in the harsh environment of West Africa. The Lobi represent the nature spirits whom they called Thil with figures that can be carved of wood, modeled from clay, or cast in brass.

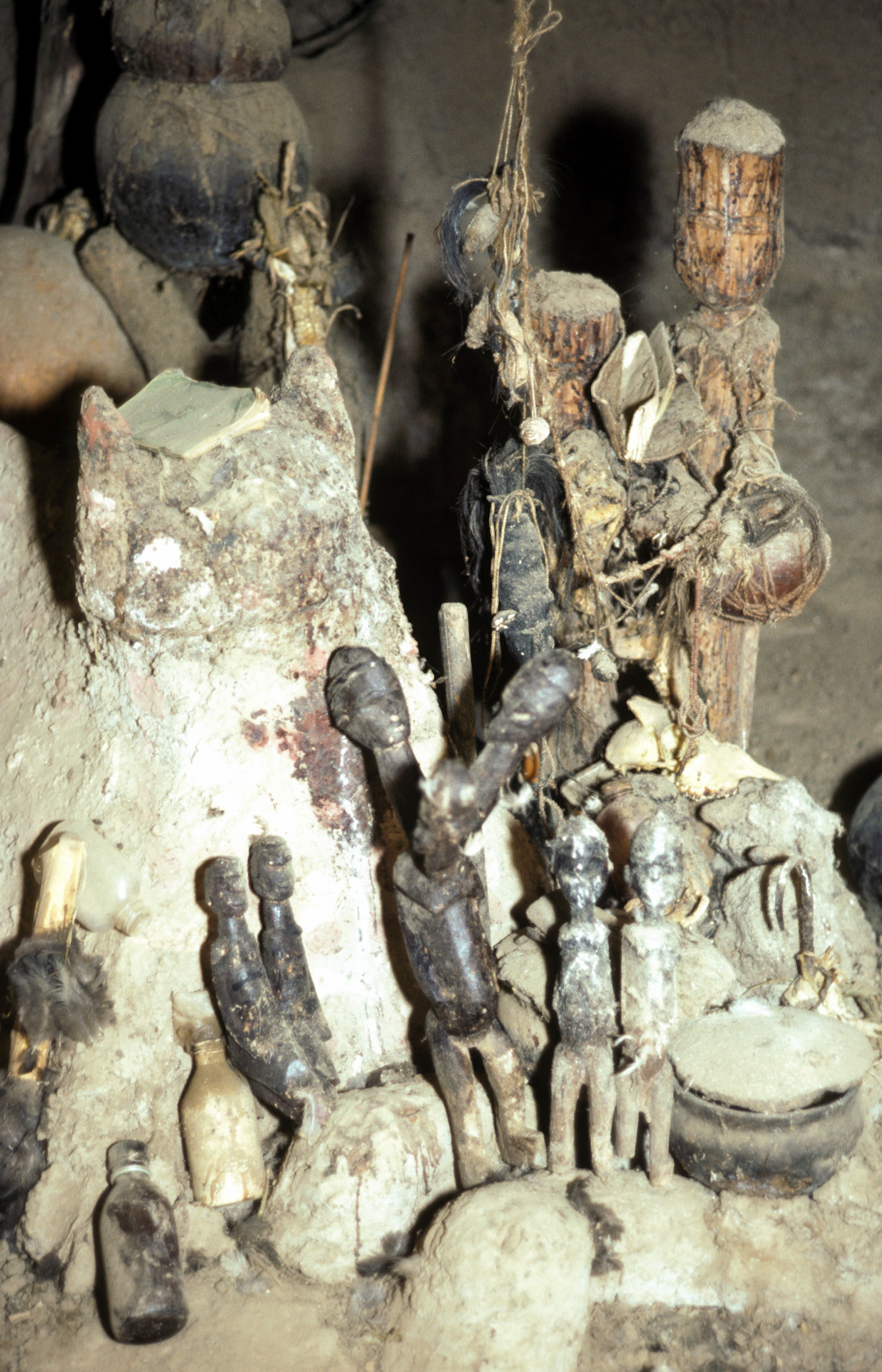
Shrine in a Lobi home, village of Dako, Burkina Faso

These figures are called Boteba, and are usually housed in a dark shrine in the most remote space in the back of the family home. Larger clay figures may be kept outside, where because of the material from which they are made they are safe from theft. Brass figures are often worn on the body by members of the family.

Each of these figures displays different gestures or poses, some of them may have two or even three heads, some female figures carry an infant under one arm. These unique features represent the particular talent or power of the spiritual being that they embody. A figure with two heads is twice as quick to recognize threat and to deal with it. A figure with an infant has the power to bring fertility to the women of the family. A figure holding one arm up blocks the entrance of malevolent spirits to the family home.

== Bobo ==
In much of the literature on African art the group that lives in the area of Bobo-Dioulasso is called Bobo-Fing. These people call themselves Bobo. They speak a Mandé language. The Bobo number about 110,000 people, with the great majority in Burkina Faso, although the area occupied by the Bobo extends north into Mali. The Bobo are far from homogeneous. They are an ancient amalgamation of several peoples who have assembled around a number of core clans that do not preserve any oral traditions of immigration into the area. Their language and culture are more closely related to those of their Mandé neighbors to the north, the Bamana and Minianka, than to their Voltaic neighbors thegurunsi and Mossi, but they should be thought of as a southern extension of the Mandé people, that live in what is now Burkina Faso, rather than an intrusive Mandé group that has recently penetrated the region. Although over 41% of Bobo lineages claim a foreign origin, they also claim to be autochthonous.

The Bobo creator God is called Wuro. He cannot be described and is not represented by sculpture. Bobo cosmogonic myths, wuro da fere, describe the creation of the world by Wuro and the ordering of his creations, which are placed in basic opposing pairs: man/spirits, male/female, village/bush, domesticated/wild, culture/nature, safety/danger, cold/hot, farmer/blacksmith. The balances between forces as they were created by Wuro are precarious, and it is easy for man, through the simplest daily acts, to pollute his world and throw the forces out of balance. Even farming, in which crops are gathered in the bush and brought into the village, can unbalance the precarious equilibrium between culture/nature, village/bush. The following summary describes the relationship between Wuro, man, and the smith.

The Bobo use masks in three major contexts: masks appear at harvest time in annual rites called birewa dâga. Masks participate in the male initiation, named yele dâga, which is their major function. Finally, they participate in the burial (syebi) and the funeral rites (syekwe) of people who have been killed by Dwo, or of the elder priests of Dwo. This is a secondary function, and not all masks of all Bobo clans attend these rites. Masks seem to participate in funerals much more frequently in the Syankoma area in the south, near Bobo-Dioulasso, than in the north.

Leaf masks representing the initial and universal form of Dwo serve to integrate the individual into human society and to link the community of man with the natural world; fiber masks fix the individual in a social grouping, dedicated to one of the later forms of Dwo. These masks are important agents of socialization. The significance of these lessons is impressed on each new generation in the major institution of initiation.

The different levels of knowledge are explained to Bobo boys in several steps spread out over a period of fifteen years. Masks play an essential role in initiation because they reestablish and reinforce the cosmic order created by Wuro, and restore the balance and the rhythms of the natural world and of the community. Each of the new steps in the initiation is punctuated by important ceremonies when the initiates dance with several types of masks.

== Wall painting ==
This tradition gives women collective pride and self-esteem manifested in the process of bambolse, a term used exclusively to describe the embellishment or decoration to add aesthetic to wall decoration. These walls are adorned with geometric designs and symbols of animals and people. Each of these symbols are representations of key parts of life in their society. The Gurensi people and their wall decorations directly relate to a woman’s ability and her investment in her community. This society is polyamorous, and this tradition gives women a chance to showcase their individuality while serving as social interaction and a way to please their husbands. The women say that this art form is a part of their life in the same way that eating or sleeping is incorporated.

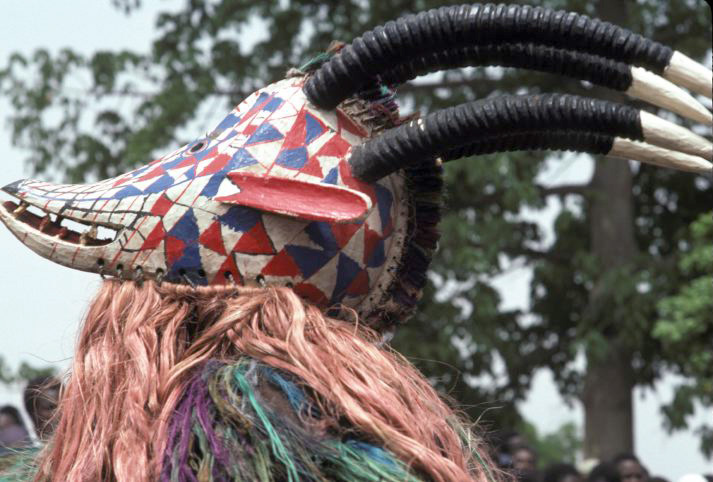
A dancer in an antelope mask performs at a funeral in the southern Bobo village of Dofigso, Spring, 1985

== Modern art ==
Burkina Faso's contemporary art scene developed with policy support for the arts beginning post-independence in the 1980s. Contemporary art in Burkina Faso synthesizes the traditional artwork of indigenous ethnic groups and westernized techniques of art, creating works unique to Burkinaabe life and culture. Artists use visual mediums like photography and sculpture to comment on issues including corruption, gender, and the impact of Thomas Sankara. The 2018 documentary film Burkinabè Rising features artists using sculpture, music, dance, and other art mediums to explore socio-political issues and cultural expression.

=== Institutions and events ===
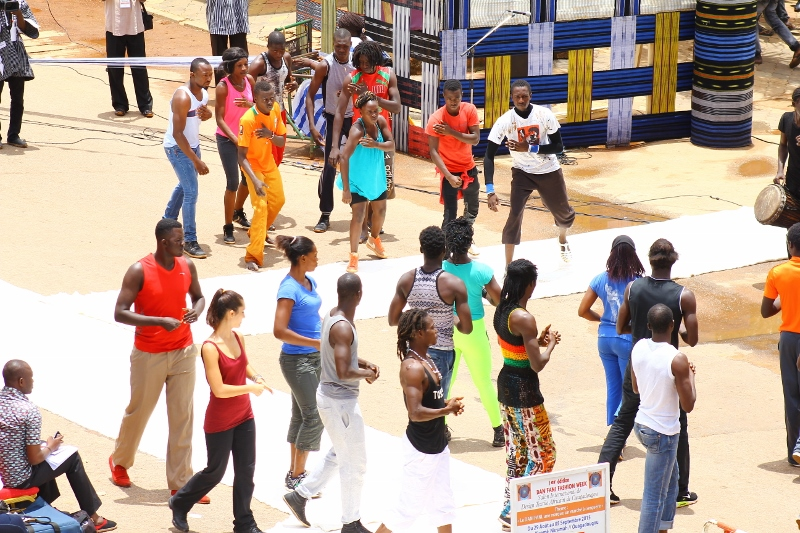
A performance at the Dan Fani Fashion Show in Ouagadougou in 2015

Several institutional initiatives support local artists, supported by the government through the Ministry of Culture, Arts, and Tourism (MCAT). Semaine Nationale de la Culture (or "National Cultural Week", abbreviated to SNC) is a showcase and competition established in 1983. The SNC takes place every other year in the city of Bobo-Dioulasso. This event includes the Grand Prix National des Arts et des Lettres National (National Grand Prize for Art and Literature). The International Art & Craft Fair (in French, Le Salon International de L Artisanat, or SIAO) is held every other year in Ouagadougou and was first held in 1988. The Biennale Internationale de Sculpture de Ouagadougou (Biannual International of Sculpture in Ouagadougou, abbreviated to BISO) began in 2019 and is the first biannual event dedicated to contemporary sculpture in Africa. Modern fashions incorporating the national cloth Faso Dan Fani have been displayed at the Ouagadougou Fashion Week.

=== International exhibitions ===
- From June to July of 2024, seven Burkinaabe artists were featured in an exhibit titled, "Au pays des Hommes intègres" at the Christopher Person gallery in Paris, France.
- The Jackson Fine Art Gallery in Atlanta, Georgia, USA has exhibited two series of artworks by Burkinaabe artist Saïdou Dicko, one titled "fragile" and the other "shadowed people." Dicko's work contributes to support his association Nafoore Cellal, which aims to support his hometown of Yagma, Burkina Faso.
- Burkina Faso was featured in the Imago Mundi project by the Luciano Bennetton Collection, which exhibited artwork from 160 countries. The exhibition opened in Venice, Italy and is now based in Treviso, Italy. The segment dedicated to Burkina Faso included 12 works of photography and painting by contemporary artists and dealing with themes of daily life, traditional craft, and social issues.
