= Silmangué ambush =

Attack in Namentenga Province, Burkina Faso 2022

- Part of Islamist insurgency in Burkina Faso
Date	15 October 2022
Location	Silmangué, Namentenga Province, Burkina Faso
Result	IS victory

Belligerents
Burkina Faso: Burkina Faso Armed Forces; Volunteers for the Defense of the Homeland	Islamic State - Sahel Province

Casualties and losses
11 killed 2 injured 2 missing	27 killed

On October 15, 2022, militants from the Islamic State – Sahel Province (ISSP) attacked Burkinabe forces near Silmangue, Namentenga Province, Burkina Faso. The attack was the first major ambush on Burkinabe armed forces since the September 2022 Burkina Faso coup d'état that brought Ibrahim Traoré to power.

== Background ==
Burkina Faso and neighboring countries of Mali and Niger have been embroiled in a jihadist insurgency by Jama'at Nusrat al-Islam wal-Muslimin and the Islamic State's Sahel Province for years. By 2019, around 40% of the country was under the control or influence of jihadist groups. In northeast Burkina Faso, the Islamic State is much more prevalent than JNIM. The crippling insurgency caused Paul-Henri Sandaogo Damiba to overthrow President Roch Marc Christian Kaboré in January 2022 under the pretext that Kabore wasn't doing enough to fight the jihadists, but the insurgency continued under Damiba. After a spate of deadly attacks in Bam and Silgadji in September 2022, Ibrahim Traoré overthrew Damiba.

== Ambush ==
The Burkinabe authorities did not release much information about the attack. A group of Burkinabe soldiers and pro-government Volunteers for the Defense of the Homeland (VDP) militiamen were killed at Silmangue, near Bouroum in Namentenga Province. Three soldiers were killed in the attack and eight VDP were killed. Two soldiers were also unaccounted for several days after the attack. Two others were also injured.

Burkinabe authorities launched several aerial attacks on jihadists following the ambush. One strike targeting fighters in the village of Ankouna killed 27 militants. The ambush was the first attack on Burkinabe government forces since Traore came to power.
