= Nagbingou (department) =

- Department
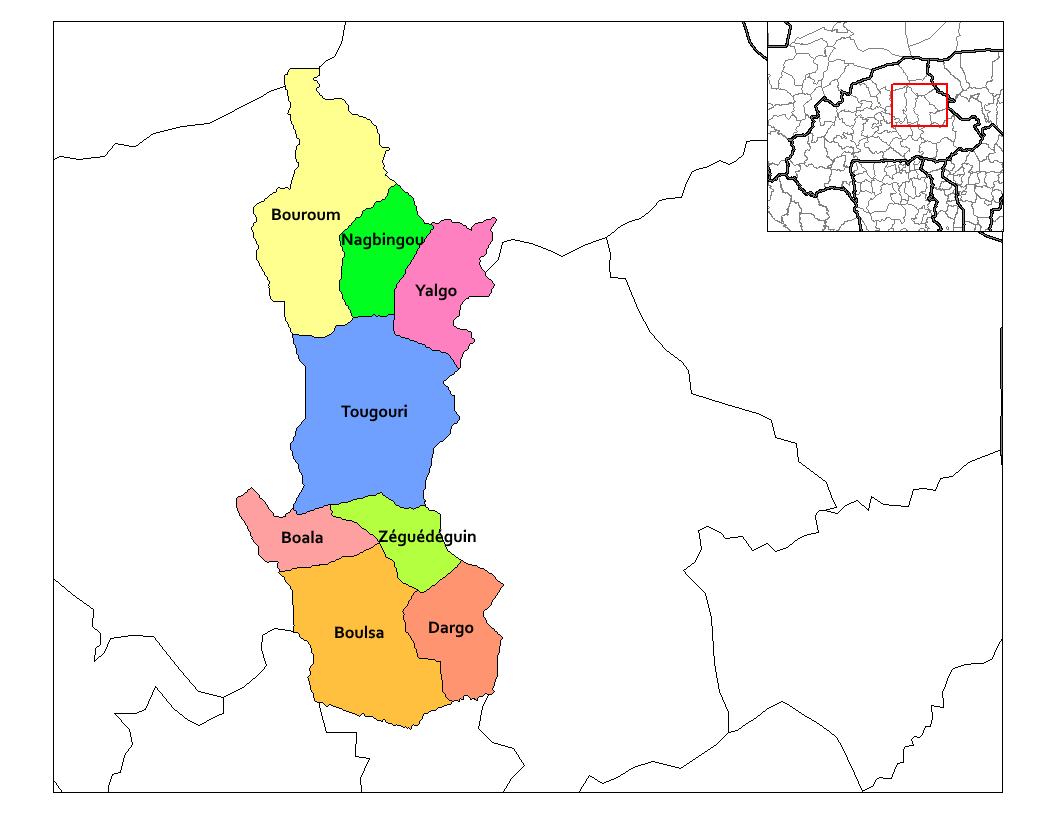
- Nagbingou Department location in the province
- Country: Burkina Faso
- Region: Centre-Nord Region
- Province: Namentenga Province

Population (2012)
  - Total: 16,004
- Time zone: UTC+0 (GMT 0)

Nagbingou is a department or commune of Namentenga Province in Burkina Faso.

According to population statistics from the Institut National de la Statistique et de la Démographie (INSD), the Nagbingou commune had an estimated population of about 32 210 residents as of the 2019 census. The department is one of several administrative subdivisions within Namentenga Province, which includes other communes such as Boala, Boulsa and Tougouri.

== Cities ==
- Nagbingou
