= 2022 Boala attack =

Killings in Namentenga, Burkina Faso

- Part of Jihadist insurgency in Burkina Faso
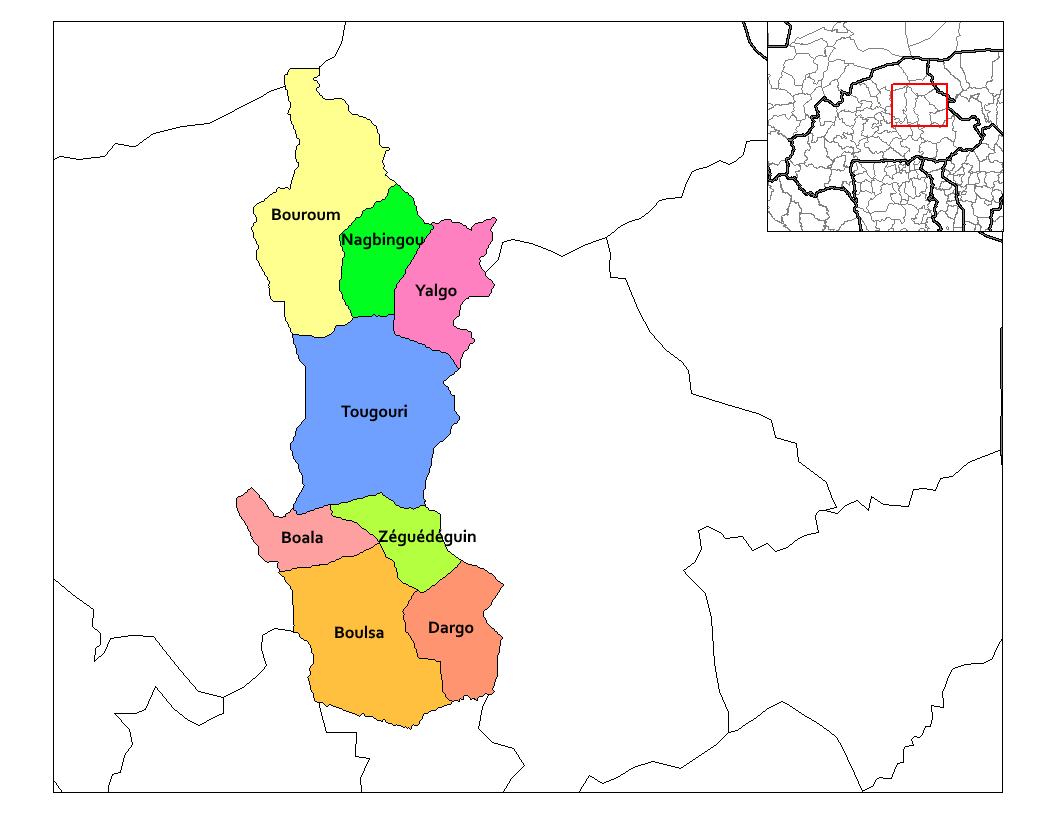
- Boala's location in Namentenga Province
Date	December 7, 2022
Location	Boala Department, Namentenga Province, Burkina Faso
Result	Indecisive

Belligerents
Volunteers for the Defense of the Homeland	Unknown jihadists

Casualties and losses
10 killed Several injured	20 killed
- 9 civilians killed in total

On December 7, 2022, ten Volunteers for the Defense of the Homeland militants, a Burkinabe civilian militia, were killed at a market in Boala Department, Centre-Nord Region, Burkina Faso. A second attack on December 10 killed seven civilians.

== Prelude ==
Northern Burkina Faso has been embroiled in an insurgency since 2015 after jihadists aligned with Al-Qaeda and ISIS moved into the rural north of the country, along with the development of homegrown jihadist movements like Ansar ul-Islam. To combat attacks against non-Fulani civilians in the area by these jihadists groups, local Mossi peoples created a government-allied civilian militia called the Koglweogo, later known as the Volunteers for the Defense of the Homeland, or VDP. In Namentenga province, where the Boala attack took place, tensions between civilians, the VDP, and jihadist groups increased in the latter half of 2022. An attack in Namentenga killed ten people in June, and an ambush in Silmangue, a village in the province in October killed eleven Burkinabe soldiers and VDP militiamen. Just days before the Boala attack, six civilians were killed by jihadists in Bittikou, near the Ghanaian and Togolese borders.

== Attack ==
The attack began at the market in Boala, the capital of Namentenga province, on the evening of December 7. According to a regional VDP official, the VDP fought with the perpetrators for two hours. The skirmish left ten VDP killed, along with two civilians. Twenty jihadists were also killed.

Jihadists attacked Boulsa a second time on December 10, setting fire to the local market. In the second attack, seven civilians were killed.
