= List of Burkinabé artists =

This is a list of notable artists from, or associated with, Burkina Faso.

== K ==
- Diébédo Francis Kéré (born 1965)

== M ==
- Hamidou Maiga (born 1932)

== S ==
- Odile Sankara
- Sanlé Sory (born 1943)
