= Dargaud (disambiguation) =

Dargaud is a publisher of Franco-Belgian comics series.

Dargaud may also refer to:

- Georges Dargaud, French publisher of comics, founder of the Dargaud company
- Dargaud Marina, French film production company

== See also ==
- Dargo
