= Sory =

Sory is a surname and a given name. Notable people with the name include:

== Surname ==
- Moussa Sory (born 1988), Burkinabé international footballer
- Petit Sory (born 1945), Guinean professional footballer
- Sanlé Sory (born 1943), Burkinabe photographer

== Given name ==
- Ibrahima Sory Bah (born 1999), professional footballer
- Ibrahima Sory Bangoura (born 1982), Guinean footballer
- Ibrahima Sory Barry (died 1975), Guinean chief and politician
- Ibrahima Sory Camara (born 1985), naturalized Guinean international footballer
- Ibrahima Sory Conte (born 1981), Guinean football player
- Ibrahima Sory Conté (footballer, born 1991), Guinean professional footballer
- Sory Ibrahim Diarra (born 2000), Malian footballer
- Ibrahima Sory Doumbouya (born 1996), Guinean professional footballer
- Sory Kaba (born 1995), Guinean professional footballer
- Sory Kessebeh (1820–1897), Loko leader in the mergent Sierra Leone protectorate
- Sory Kandia Kouyaté (died 1977), Guinean singer
- Alpha Ibrahima Sory Maoudho (born 1751), Fula religious leader
- Almamy Sory Mawdo (died 1784), Fula leader of the Imamate of Futa Jallon
- Ibrahima Sory Sankhon (born 1996), Guinean footballer
- Ibrahima Sory Souare (born 1982), Guinean football midfielder
- Ibrahima Sory Soumah (born 1995), Guinean footballer
- Ibrahim Sory Touré (1970–1996), Malian footballer

== See also ==
- Sori (disambiguation)
