= Yalgo Department =

Yalgo
- Department
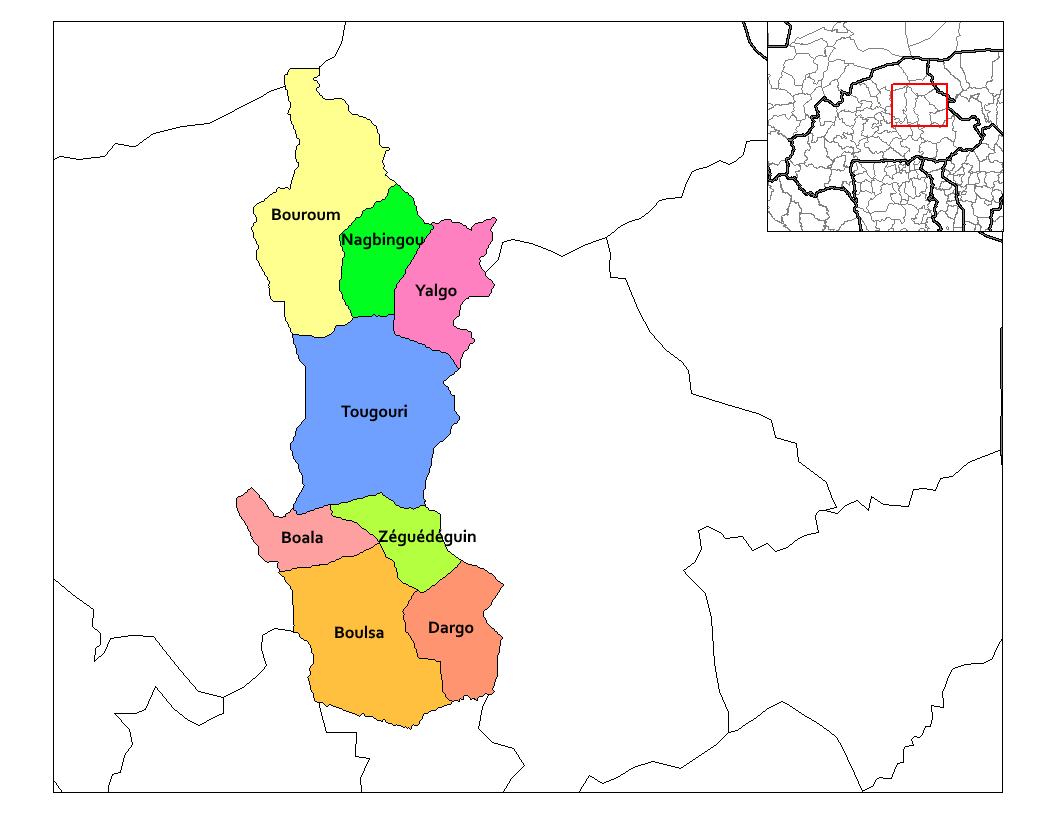
- Yalgo Department location in the province
- Country: Burkina Faso
- Region: Centre-Nord Region
- Province: Namentenga Province
- Time zone: UTC+0 (GMT 0)

Yalgo is a department or commune of Namentenga Province in northern Burkina Faso. Its capital lies at the town of Yalgo.
