= Zéguédéguin Department =

Coordinates: 12°57′20.57″N 0°27′14.56″W

Zeguedeguin
- Department
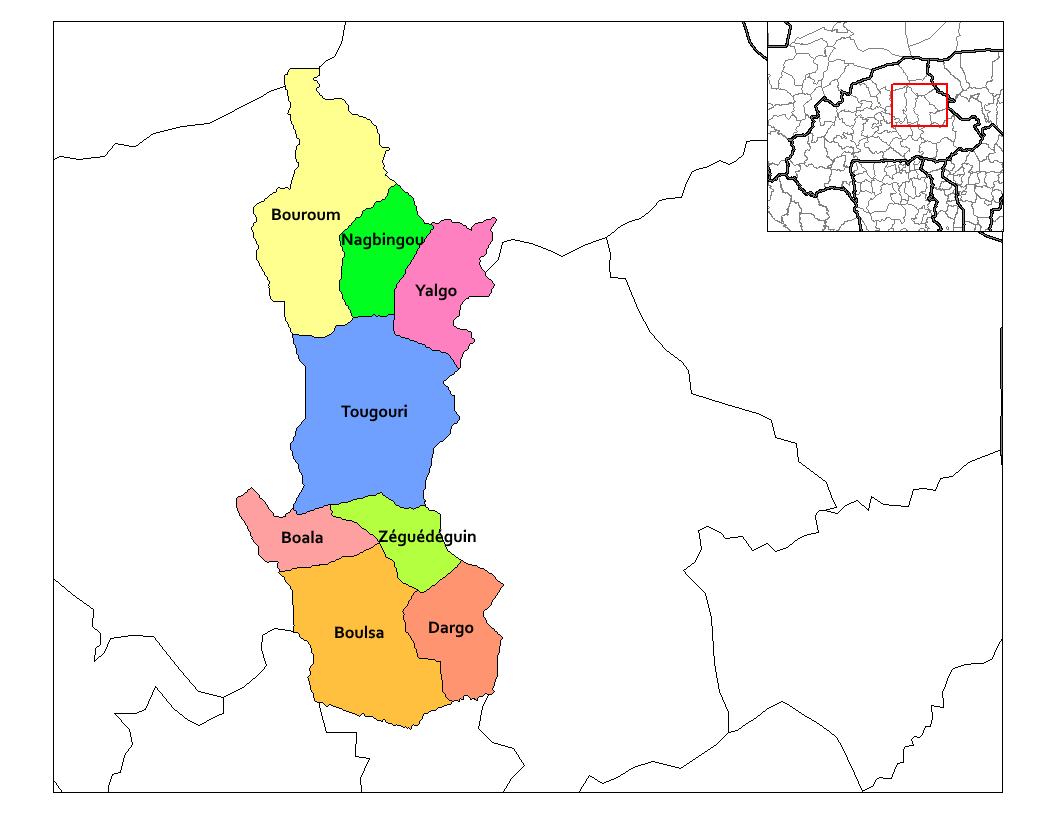
- Zeguedeguin Department location in the province
- Country: Burkina Faso
- Region: Centre-Nord Region
- Province: Namentenga Province

Area
  - Total: 145.5 sq mi (376.8 km^{2})

Population (2019 census)
  - Total: 37,377
  - Density: 256.9/sq mi (99.20/km^{2})
- Time zone: UTC+0 (GMT 0)

Zéguédéguin is a department or commune of Namentenga Province in northern Burkina Faso. Its capital lies at the town of Zeguedeguin.
