= Sori =

Sori may refer to:

== Things ==
- The plural of sorus, a cluster of sporangia
- SoRI-20041, a drug
- SoRI-9409, a drug

== Places ==
- Sori, Benin, a town in Benin, West Africa
- Sori, Kenya, a town in Kenya, East Africa
- Sori, Liguria, an Italian comune (municipality)
- Sori Square, a city square in Tampere, Pirkanmaa, Finland
- Sōri Station, a train station in Midori, Gunma Prefecture, Japan
- Sori, Bihar, a village in Aurangabad District, Bihar

== People ==
=== Surname ===
- Ibrahim Sori (died c. 1784), leader of the Kingdom of Fouta Djallon in what is now Guinea in West Africa
- Abdul Rahman Ibrahima Sori (1762–1829), West African prince, enslaved in the United States
- Fumihiko Sori (born 1964), Japanese film director and producer
- Soni Sori (born c. 1975), Indian schoolteacher and human rights activist
- Rosine Sori-Coulibaly (born 1958), Burkinabé economist and politician

=== Given name ===
- Sori Choi, South Korean percussionist
- Sori (singer) (born Kim So-ri, 1990), South Korean singer
- Sori Mané (born 1996), Bissau-Guinean footballer
- Moon So-ri (born 1974), South Korean actress
- Ok So-ri (born 1968), South Korean actress
- Sori Siregar (1939–2021), Indonesian writer
- Sori Yanagi (1915–2011), Japanese product designer

== Music ==
- Sori (music), a symbol used in Iranian traditional music that denotes a quarter step upwards in tone

== See also ==
- Soori (disambiguation)
- Soris (fl. 2600 BC), Egyptian pharaoh, founding monarch of the 4th Dynasty
- Sory, a given name and surname
