= Pierre Sandwidi =

Burkinabé singer

- Born: 1947; Boulsa, Upper Volta (now Burkina Faso)
- Died: 1998 (aged 50–51)
- Genres: Electro-funk; Afro-pop
- Occupations: Singer; songwriter; musician
- Instruments: Vocals; guitar
- Years active: 1971 – 1995
- Labels: Disques Paysans Noirs; Compagnie Voltaïque du Disque

Pierre Sandwidi (1947 – 1998) was a Burkinabé singer, songwriter and guitarist. Nicknamed "the troubadour from the bush", he was born in the village of Boulsa in Upper Volta (now Burkina Faso). Sandwidi is considered a pioneer of the Voltaic sound and his songs served as cult anthems for the country's cultural and political movements. He was an active member of trade unions and the African Independence Party. Sandwidi served as an opponent of Upper Voltan president Sangoulé Lamizana and criticized the corrupted administration of Ouagadougou. Sandwidi's music is classified as early electro-funk and Afro-pop.

Sandwidi attended the Zinda Kaboré High School in Ouagadougou during the early 1960s. His early material was performed live on national radio in a method preferred by Voltaic musicians over single releases. In 1971, Sandwidi won a national competition for modern singers. He joined the National Ballet of Upper Volta as a guitarist and toured Niger, Ivory Coast, Benin and Canada.

Sandwidi recorded his first songs on the Disques Paysans Noirs imprint. His musical output increased in the mid-1970s: he recorded two singles for Compagnie Voltaïque du Disque in 1975 and released three more with L’Harmonie Voltaïque as a backing band in 1976. "Tond yabramba" (1976), a recount of Voltaic history, received frequent radio airplay while "Yamb ney capitale" (1977), a protest song against ailing morality and the rise of individualism in Ouagadougou, sold 3,000 copies as a rare achievement in Upper Volta. Sandwidi recorded his first full-length album in 1979.

Sandwidi served as a militant of the Committees for the Defense of the Revolution under the rule of President Thomas Sankara from 1983 to 1987 and took part in the cultural invigoration of his neighborhood. Sandwidi distanced himself from politics after the death of Sankara in 1987 but still focused on writing new songs; his final release was in 1995. Sandwidi died in 1998 after being of fragile health.

== Discography ==
Studio albums

- 1984: Le Troubadour De La Savane

Compilation albums

- 2018: Le Troubadour De La Savane 1976–1980
