= Boala Department =

Coordinates: 12°53′N 0°42′W

Boala
- Department
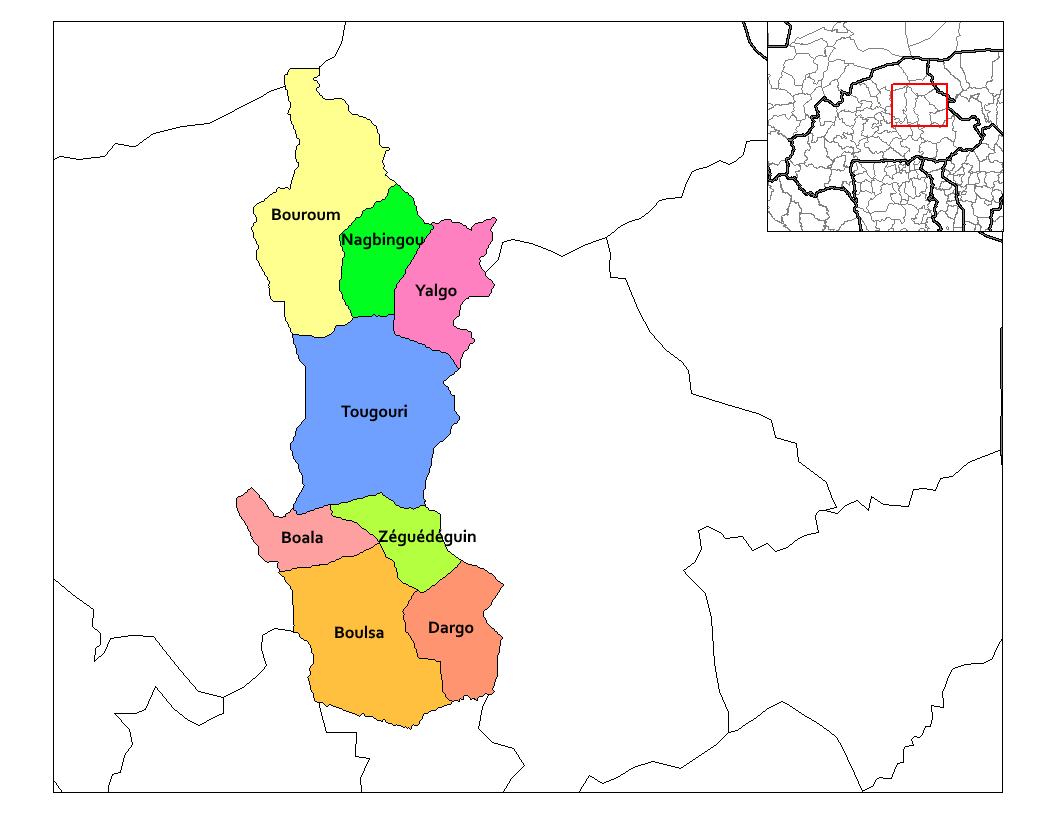
- Boala Department location in the province
- Country: Burkina Faso
- Region: Centre-Nord Region
- Province: Namentenga Province

Area
  - Total: 148.8 sq mi (385.3 km^{2})

Population (2019 census)
  - Total: 38,224
  - Density: 256.9/sq mi (99.21/km^{2})
- Time zone: UTC+0 (GMT 0)

Boala is a department or commune of Namentenga Province in northern Burkina Faso. Its capital lies at the town of Boala.
