= Bouroum Department =

Coordinates: 13°36′48″N 0°39′00″W

- Department
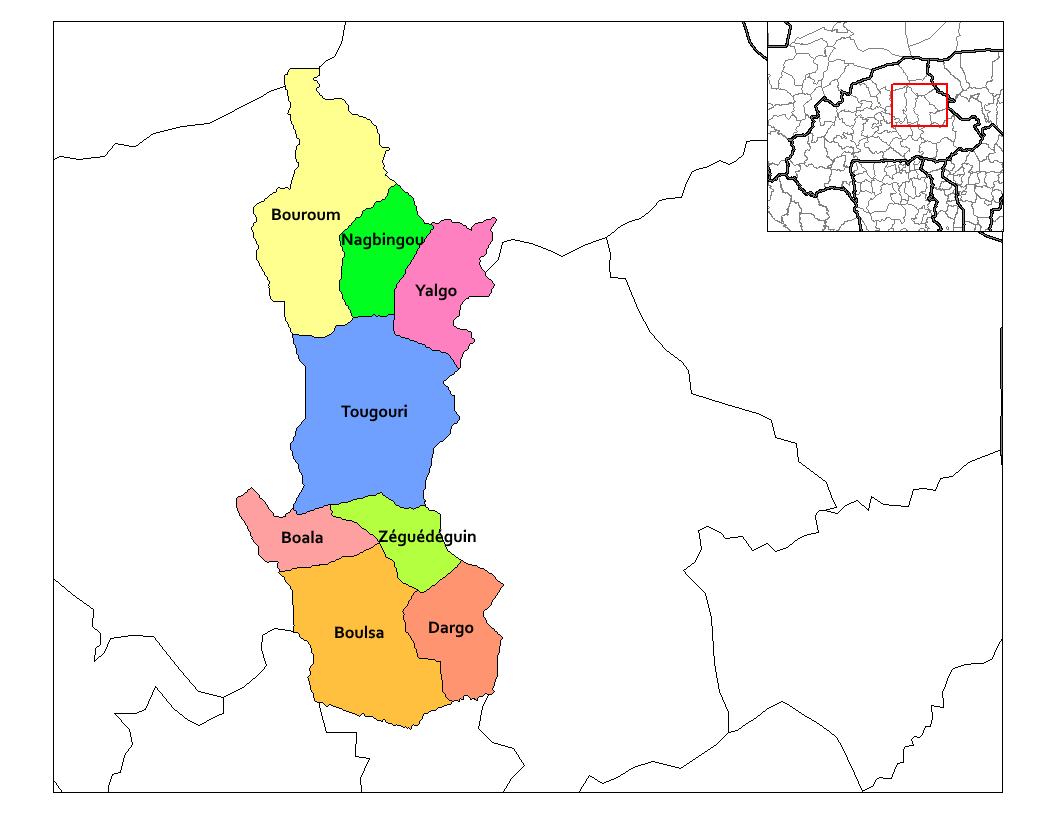
- Bouroum Department location in the province
- Country: Burkina Faso
- Region: Centre-Nord Region
- Province: Namentenga Province

Area
  - Total: 500 sq mi (1,290 km^{2})

Population (2019)
  - Total: 78,149
  - Density: 157/sq mi (60.6/km^{2})
- Time zone: UTC+0 (GMT 0)

The Bouroum Department is a department or commune of Namentenga Province in northern Burkina Faso. Its capital lies at the town of Bouroum.

== Towns and villages ==
- Bouroum (capital)
