= Dargo =

Dargo may refer to:

- Dargo Department, a department and rural commune of Namentenga Province in Centre-Nord Region, Burkina Faso
  - Dargo, Burkina Faso, the capital of the Dargo Department in Burkina Faso
- Dargo, Vedensky District, a village in Chechnya
- Dargo, Victoria, a small town in the state of Victoria, Australia
- Dargo River, a river in the Alpine and East Gippsland regions of Victoria, Australia
- Craig Dargo (born 1978), a Scottish professional football player and coach
- Haval Dargo, a sport utility vehicle

== See also ==
- Dargaud
