= Soori =

Soori may refer to:

- Soori (2001 film), an Indian Telugu film starring J. D. Chakravarthy and Priyanka Upendra
- Soori (2003 film), an Indian Tamil film starring Vignesh and Parthiban
- protagonist of RX Soori, a 2015 Indian Kannada film
- Soori (actor), stage name of Indian Tamil actor and comedian Ramalakshmanan Muthuchamy Thevar (born 1977)

== See also ==
- Suri (disambiguation)
