= Dargo Department =

Coordinates: 12°42′53″N 0°17′20″W

- Department
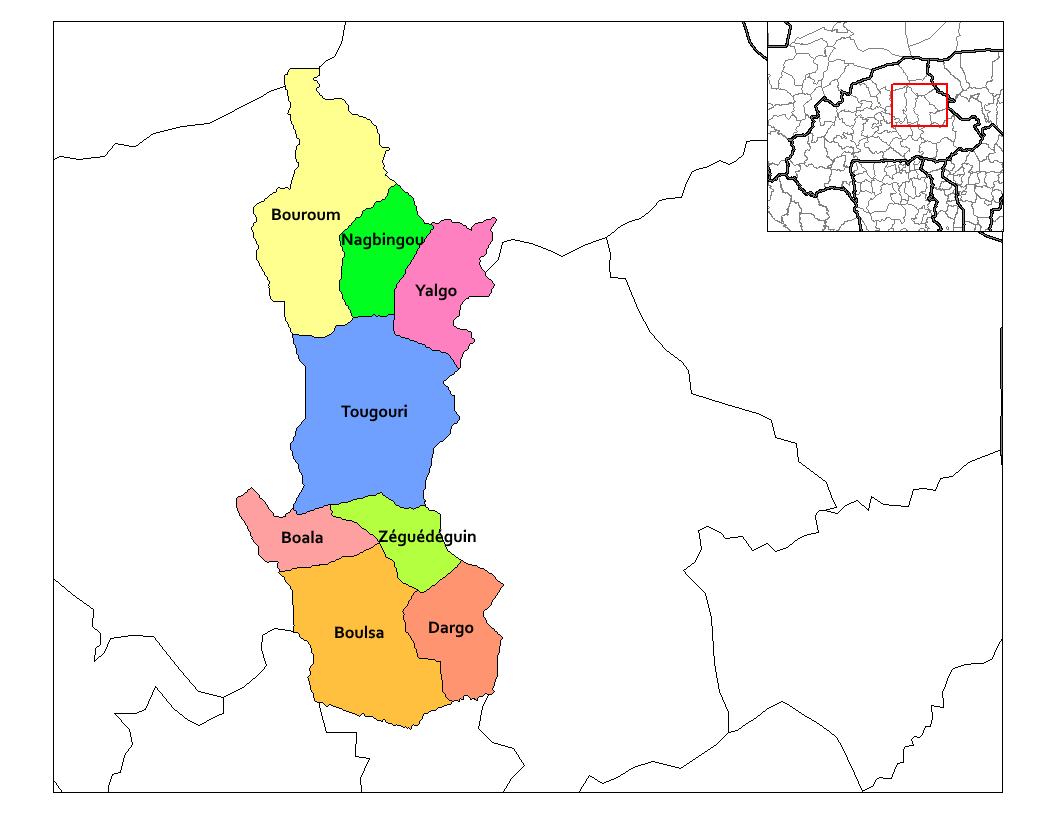
- Dargo Department location in the province
- Country: Burkina Faso
- Region: Centre-Nord Region
- Province: Namentenga Province

Population
  - Total: 28.994
- Time zone: UTC+0 (GMT 0)

The Dargo Department (also Dargo) is a department or commune of Namentenga Province in northern Burkina Faso. Its capital lies at the town of Dargo.

== Towns and villages ==
- Dargo (capital)
