= Odile Sankara =

Burkinabé filmmaker

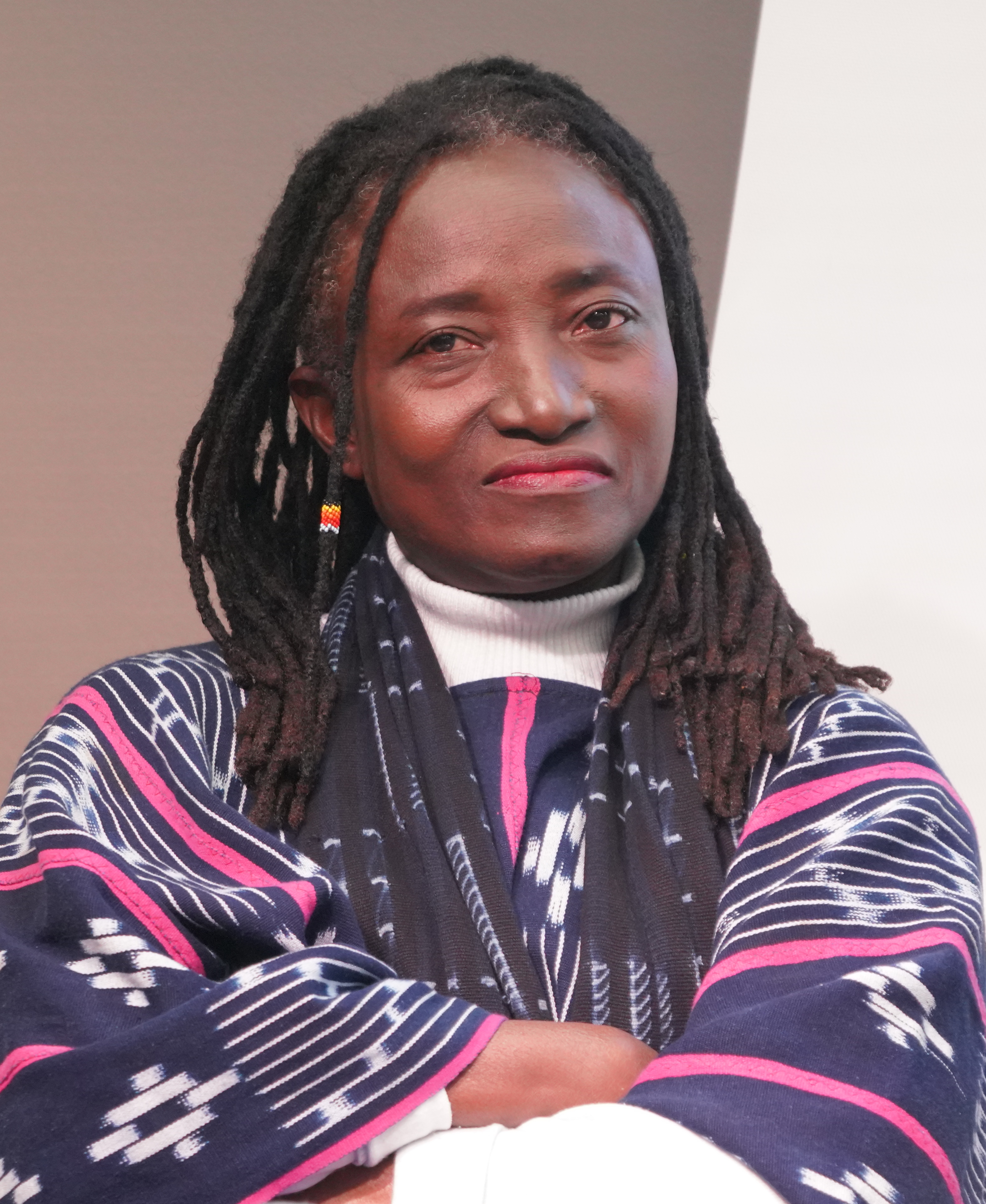
- 2023
- Born: Odile Sankara
- Occupations: Artist; Actress; Playwright; director
- Notable work: Burkinabè Rising

Odile Sankara is a Burkinabé artist, actress, playwright and director. She is the President of the Récréâtrales and a younger sister to the late revolutionary leader of Burkina Faso, Thomas Sankara.

== Career ==
Sankara was featured in Iara Lee's 2018 film, Burkinabè Rising: the art of resistance in Burkina Faso.

== Filmography ==
Year	Film	Role	Notes	Ref.
2018	Burkinabè Rising	Actress	Documentary	
2012 –	Face of Africa	Director	TV series, Documentary	
