= August 2022 Bam ambush =

Terrorist attack in Bam, Burkina Faso

August 2022 Bam attack
- Part of the Islamist insurgency in Burkina Faso
Date	August 4, 2022
Location	Bam Province, Burkina Faso
Result	Indecisive

Belligerents
Burkina Faso Armed Forces; Volunteers for the Defense of the Homeland	Unspecified Islamist insurgents

Casualties and losses
9 killed (VDP)	34 killed (Government claim)
- 4 civilians killed

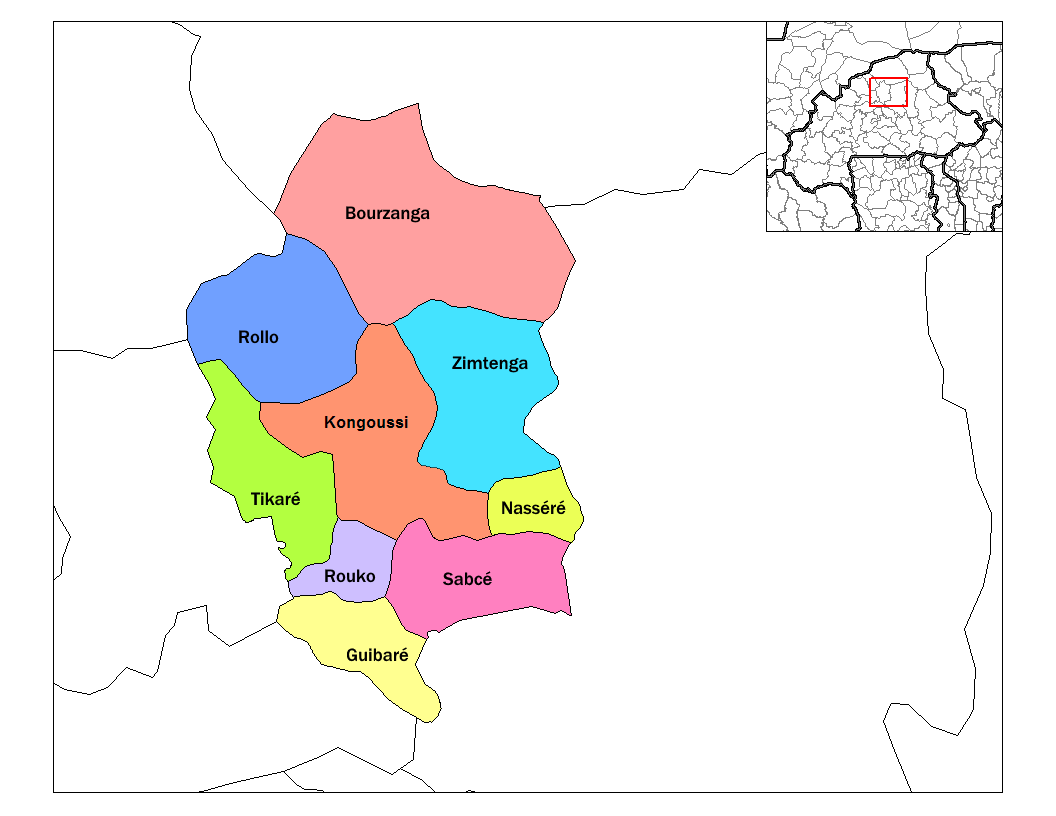
Map of the departments of Bam province in Burkina Faso.

On August 4, 2022, jihadist militants ambushed a counter-terrorism operation organized by the Burkina Faso Armed Forces, killing four civilians and nine VDP militiamen. The Burkinabe government claimed that thirty-four insurgents were killed immediately after the attack.

== Background ==
Northern Burkina Faso has been embroiled in civil war between jihadist insurgents and the Burkinabe military since mid-2015. In January 2022, disgruntled military members overthrew the Burkinabe government claiming that the president, Roch Kaboré, was not doing enough to prevent an increasing amount of jihadist attacks in the country. The Damiba administration, which took power after the coup, oversaw a further rise in jihadist attacks. This trend continued in August, where just a day earlier the Burkinabe military had maimed civilians during a counter-terrorism operation in the southeast of the country.

== Attack ==
The attack occurred in Bam province, in the north of the country. According to a Burkinabe government statement, Islamist militants attacked government forces during a counter-terrorism operation, which left nine VDP servicemen and four civilians dead. The remaining government forces fired back, and claimed to have killed 34 insurgents.
