= Burkinabè Rising =

2018 documentary by Iara Lee

Burkinabè Rising: the art of resistance in Burkina Faso
- Film poster
- Directed by: Iara Lee
- Produced by: Iara Lee
- Starring: Joey le Soldat; Marto; Malika la Slameuse; Serge Aimé Coulibaly; Odile Sankara
- Release date: 2018
- Running time: 72 minutes
- Country: Burkina Faso
- Languages: English; French; Mooré

Burkinabè Rising (also Burkinabé Rising): the art of resistance in Burkina Faso is a 2018 long documentary film directed and produced by Iara Lee.

== Production ==
The documentary was produced by Cultures of Resistance films, in Burkina Faso, Bulgaria and United States in English, French and Mooré and lasts 72 minutes.

== Plot/Synopsis ==
The documentary displays nonviolent activists and citizens of Burkina Faso pave way in an engaged manner, for a new day in the politics of their nation. Hemce, showing an example worthy of emulation to the continent of Africa and the whole world. The film features a people with a revolutionary spirit akin to that of its former leader (1983-1987), Thomas Sankara, killed in a coup d'etat by a friend of his and successor, Blaise Compaoré, by way of music, film, ecology, visual art and architecture. Compaoré who ruled for 27 years afterwards in October 2014 got removed by a great popular insurrection, with the spirit remaining with the people even yet.

Travelling across the country to film the documentary, BURKINABÈ RISING: the art of resistance in Burkina Faso, its director, Iara Lee meets an interesting set of cast of artists, musicians and activists, bent at promoting the culture of the through the arts for which the country is known for. The rapper, Joey le Soldat, makes references to the struggles of the impoverished youth in Ouagadougou and of the toiling farmers in the country side; the graffiti artist, Marto, decries injustice by giving colourful mural designs to the city walls; the women's rights activist, Malika la Slameuse, from a feminist perspective on a male-dominated art form performs poetry; the dancer, Serge Aimé Coulibaly, from his dance movement encourages his viewers to take political action.

The film also documents a festival of recycled art and interviews farmer groups resisting the encroachment of corporate agriculture. In total, the film expresses different individuals in different walks of life search for peace and justice by means of cultural expression.

== Cast ==
- Le Balai Citoyen
- Serge Bayala
- Bouda Blandine
- Konaté Bomavé
- Séré Boukson
- Aimé Césa
- Raissa Compaoré
- Serge Aimé Coulibaly
- Sophie Garcia
- Emmanuel Ilboudo
- Hado Ima
- Jean-Marie Koalga
- Sahab Koanda
- Jean-Robert Koudogbo Kiki
- Souleymane Ladji Koné
- Bil Aka Kora
- Sanou Lagassane
- Benjamin Lebrave
- Ki Léonce
- Mabiisi
- Marto
- Alif Naaba
- Bend Naaba
- Arnaud Ouambatou
- Mohamed Ouedraogo
- Qu'on Sonne et Voix-Ailes
- Blandine Sankara
- Odile Sankara
- Salia Sanou
- Sophie Sedgho
- Malika La Slameuse
- Smockey
- Snake
- Joey Le Soldat
- Fatou Souratie
- Ali Tapsoba
- Gualbert Thiombiano
- Issa Tiendrébéodo
- Ousmane Tiendrébéodo
- Gidéon Vink
- Onasis Wendker
- Blandine Yameogo
- Amina Yanogo

== Reception ==
The film was screened by Suns Cinema, Washington DC in collaboration with Cultures of Resistance on October 16, 2018. It was also screened at the Sembène Film Festival on March 25, 2019.

The film was awarded the Best Documentary Film award and got nominations for Best Original Score and Outstanding Woman Director awards at the New York City's 7th annual Winter Film Awards International Film Festival (WFAIFF) in 2018.

== Accolades ==
Year	Event	Prize	Recipient	Result
2018	WFAIFF	Best Documentary Film	Iara Lee	Won
2018	WFAIFF	Best Original Score	Iara Lee	Nominated
2018	WFAIFF	Outstanding Woman Director	Iara Lee	Nominated
