= International Art & Craft Fair =

Trade show held biennially in Ouagadougou, Burkina Faso

International Art and Craft Fair, Ouagadougou
- Genre: Arts and handicrafts
- Frequency: Biennially
- Locations: Ouagadougou, Burkina Faso
- Founded: 1984

The International Art and Craft Fair, Ouagadougou – better known by its French name, SIAO (Le Salon International de L Artisanat de Ouagadougou) – is a trade show for art and handicrafts held biennially in Ouagadougou, the capital of Burkina Faso. It is one of Africa's most important arts and crafts trade shows.

== Background ==
The potential of the arts and crafts industry is huge. Hence from 2 to 9 November 1984 the government of Burkina organized a trade show for arts and crafts products named the 'Handicraft 84'. This show permitted the government to measure how huge Burkina Faso handicraft potentialities are and allowed the government to see how important the African handicrafts were to public. As a result, the government of Burkina Faso thought it would be wise to hold this show periodically: every two years. This show would allow people from diverse backgrounds to meet, negotiate, discuss, deal and sell their products.

== The International Art and Craft Fair, Ouagadougou ==
The Ouagadougou International Art and Craft fair is a framework promoting African handicrafts. It was initiated by the National Board of Foreign Trade (ONAC) and the Chamber of Commerce of Burkina Faso. The government of Burkina Faso came up with the idea to create the SIAO for two purposes: economical and social advancement. The government of Burkina hoped that the handicrafts would reduce the deficit of the trade balance of the country. Hence, they decided to create a framework for the promotion and the exchange of African handicrafts that would be a means to facilitate their access to the international market. Moreover, the government wanted to create a medium that would facilitate reflection and consultation on problems related to the development of handicraft in African countries. Finally, the government of Burkina Faso wanted to train and supervise the craftsmen for self-promotion. On the social, intention side, the SIAO mentioned that the International Art and Craft Fair Ouagadougou, is a way to make easy the dissemination and expansion of African handicraft as a means for expression and culture.

=== SIAO (1988) ===
The 1st international meeting of African handicraft took place from 20 to 27 February 1988 in Ouagadougou. This first meeting had two major aspects : the fair itself and a colloquy which is an international forum promoting African handicraft.

The advertising campaign, made on national and African levels, brought together 244 Burkinabé craftsmen and 20 exhibiting countries such as Algeria, Benin, Burundi, Central African Republic, Ivory Coast, Gabon, Ghana, Guinea, Mali, Morocco, Mauritania, Niger, Rwanda, Senegal, Chad, Togo, Tunisia, Guadeloupe, France, Pakistan, Philippines.

The financial assistance of the European Development Fund (EDF) and the implementation in France, Italy and Germany, enabled to show the interest of participating to the SIAO, hence attracted in Ouagadougou dozens of professional visitors and buyers. The atmosphere during the fair allowed to combine what is useful with what is pleasant and turn the first SIAO into a successful event.

The colloquy, is an international forum, concerned about the African handicraft. The participants to the colloquy used to reflect on, the current situation and prospects of African handicraft. In addition, the colloquy confronted craftsmen with trainers and specialists enabling them to tackle the problems that hamper the development and promotion of African handicraft.

The communications by the different representatives on their respective experiences allowed to reach conclusions among which the most important is the Ouagadougou Declaration of Intention. The participants in the forum recommended that the Ouagadougou International Arts and Craft Fair be institutionalised and held every other year.

=== SIAO (1990) ===
The second meeting of SIAO was held from 27 October to 3 November 1990. The meeting was attended by 30 countries in which 24 African countries and about 200 Burkinabé craftsmen who exhibited in various fields like batik, painting, bronze, basket making, sculpting, furniture, textile, shoe making, arms manufacturing, pottery, jewellery, ceramic, traditional medicine, agricultural tools, energy, invention, etc... This second meeting of the SIAO focused on creativity. SIAO 1990 was held in a site of about 41,000 m² in which 5,000 m² were covered. There were 270 exhibiting stands built with a typically African architecture and 187 Burkinabé craftmen exhibiting their products. Furthermore, 15 African countries were exhibiting and 22 countries were participating to the colloquy which had the following theme African Handicraft and Creativity. The second meeting of the SIAO generated CFA 55,000,000 in addition, three creativity awards were given by UNESCO. SIAO 1990 was also attended by several European professionals of handicraft and 120,000 visitors registered. The colloquy on African handicraft and creativity led to the creation of a co-ordinating committee for the development and promotion of African handicraft (CODEPA).

=== SIAO (1992) ===
The 1992 meeting of SIAO was held from 24 October to 1 November. Its theme was : African handicraft in the face of the international market. 11 African countries took part to its activities also 260 Burkinabé craftmen. In addition, 165,720 national visitors were registered and some dozens of professional visitors.

=== SIAO (1994) ===
The 4th meeting of the Ouagadougou International Arts and Craft Fair was held from 29 October to 5 November 1994 and its theme was Handicraft and Design.

This Edition was attended by countries such as Benin, Burkina Faso, Cameroon, China, Ivory Coast, Ethiopia, Ghana, Guinea Conakry, Mauritius Island, Kenya, Madagascar, Mali, Morocco, Mauritania, Mayotte, Niger, Nigeria, Central African Republic, Senegal, Chad, Togo, Tunisia and Zaire. Several companies as well as specialised firms and many professional visitors were present.

=== SIAO (1996) ===
The 5th meeting of the SIAO was held from 26 October to 2 November 1996. Its theme was Handicraft and design. About 23 African countries and non-African countries attended this meeting. In addition, 350,000 visitors and 300 professional visitors were officially registered.

=== SIAO (1998) ===
The 6th meeting of the SIAO was held from 30 October to 8 November 1998. Its theme was Handicraft and vocational training. The 6th meeting is considered as a meeting of innovations. In fact, the SIAO has been granted, an exhibition surface of over 8,000 m².

=== SIAO (2000) ===
The 7th meeting of the SIAO was held from 27 October to 5 November 2000. About 400,000 public visitors were registered and 30 countries took part to its activities. The Theme was African handicraft and regional integration.

=== SIAO (2002) ===
The 8th meeting took place from 25 October to 3 November 2002. About 27 countries were represented. The 8th SIAO registered 1440 exhibitors, 95 buyers and professional visitors and 250,000 public visitors. The theme was African handicraft and environment

=== SIAO (2004) ===
The 9th meeting of the SIAO was held from 29 October to 7 November 2004. About 32 countries were represented. The 9th meeting of the SIAO registered 2652 exhibitors, 226 buyers and professional visitors and 352,000 public visitors. The theme was Investing in African handicraft, a promising sector.

=== SIAO (2006) ===
The tenth meeting of the International Art and Craft Fair, Ouagadougou was held from 27 October 2006 through 5 November 2006. More than 30 African countries took part to the fair. The theme was African Handicraft and Fair Trade.

=== SIAO (2008) ===
The eleventh meeting of the International Art and Craft Fair, Ouagadougou was held from 31 October to 9 November 2008. More than 35 African countries are expected to take part to this fair.

=== SIAO (2010) ===
The twelfth meeting of the International Art and Craft Fair, Ouagadougou was held from 29 October 2010 through 7 November 2010. The theme of the fair was African craft industry and creation of jobs for the youth

=== SIAO (2012) ===
The thirteenth meeting of the international Art and Craft Fair, Ouagadougou was held from 26 October through 4 November 2012. The theme of the fair was "African craft industry and economic emergence"

=== SIAO (2014, postponed) ===
The fourteenth meeting of the international Art and Craft Fair, Ouagadougou was scheduled to be held from 31 October through 9 November 2014. The theme of the fair was "African craft industry, female entrepreneurship and social protection". However due to the 2014 Burkinabe uprising, this meeting was cancelled and rescheduled from October 28 to 5 November 2016.

=== SIAO (2016) ===
The fourteenth meeting of the international Art and Craft Fair, Ouagadougou was held from 28 October through 5 November 2016. The theme of the fair was "African craft industry, female entrepreneurship and social protection".

=== SIAO (2018) ===
The fifteenth meeting of the international Art and Craft Fair, Ouagadougou was held from 26 October through 4 November 2018. The theme of the fair was "African artisanry, markets' requirements and technological development".

=== SIAO (2020, postponed) ===
The sixteenth meeting of the international Art and Craft Fair, Ouagadougou was scheduled to be held from 29 October through 8 November 2020. The theme of the fair was "African artisanry, a driver of development and factor of resilience of populations". However due to the COVID-19 outbreak, this meeting has been cancelled and rescheduled to be held from October 28 through November 6, 2022.

=== SIAO (2022) ===
The 16th edition of the Ouagadougou International Crafts Fair (SIAO), initially scheduled for October 28 to November 6, 2022, was held from January 27 to February 5, 2023. The chosen theme was African Crafts, a Lever for Development and a Factor of Population Resilience.

=== SIAO (2024) ===
The 17th OUAGADOUGOU INTERNATIONAL CRAFTS FAIR will be held from October 25 to November 3, 2024, under the High Patronage of His Excellency, the President of Faso, Captain Ibrahim Traoré. The Theme of the 17th edition is: African Crafts, Youth Entrepreneurship, and Empowerment Mali and Niger are the special guest countries at SIAO 2024. The artistic potential of the Alliance of Sahel States (AES) will be highlighted.

At the opening ceremony the Minister of Industry, Commerce and Artisans made reference to the measures that the government has taken to promote the Sankarist (after Thomas Sankara) principle of self-sufficiency and of consuming what you produce, and producing what you consume. The speech specifically mentioned the construction of a national centre for the support of the cotton processing industry and the required wearing of the Faso Dan Fani for specific groups in society including school students and judges.
