= Nagbingou =

- Interactive map of Nagbingou
- Country: Burkina Faso
- Region: Est Region
- Province: Gnagna Province
- Department: Manni Department

Population (2019)
  - Total: 3,438

Nagbingou is a town in the Manni Department of Gnagna Province in eastern Burkina Faso.

Population
Year	Pop.	±%
1985	2,018	—
2006	1,898	−5.9%
2019	3,438	+81.1%
