= Sanlé Sory =

Burkinabe photographer (born 1943)

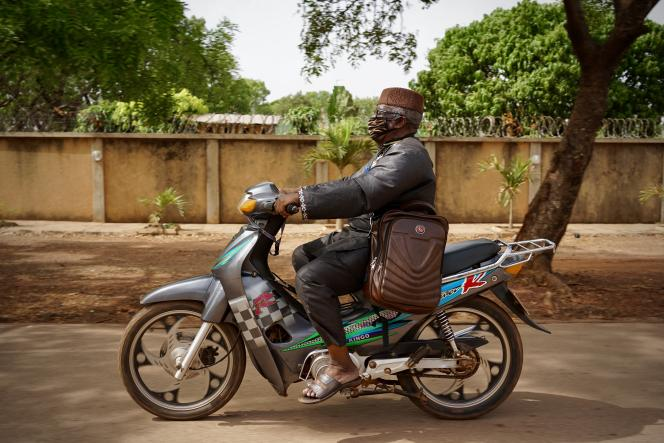
- At 79, Sory continues to crisscross Bobo-Dioulasso on his motorbike to photograph the inhabitants
- Born: 1943 (age 82–83); Bobo-Dioulasso, Burkino-Faso
- Occupation: Photographer

Sanlé Sory (born 1943) is a Burkinabe photographer.

As a teenager, he photographed automobile accidents around Bobo-Dioulasso, Burkino-Faso, which he would race to document on his motorcycle. In 1960, he founded the Volta Photo Studio in Bobo-Dioulasso. Following this, he developed a reputation as a photographer of the Burkinabe club scene in the 1960s and '70s. During this time, he also organized bals poussières, or "dust balls", where he would provide a sound system and musicians for concerts stages in the countryside. Sory would roam the bals with his camera, taking photos for money.

In 2018, the Art Institute of Chicago presented the exhibition Volta Photo: Starring Sanlé Sory and the People of Bobo-Dioulasso in the Small but Musically Mighty Country of Upper Volta (now Burkina Faso). Steidl published an accompanying catalogue, titled Volta Photo. In 2021, the fashion designer Grace Wales Bonner released a line of clothing titled Volta Jazz and inspired by Sory's photographs. The line included a film by the same name, created by Joshua Woods.

Sory's work is included in the collections of the Museum of Fine Arts Houston the Museum of Modern Art, New York and the Tang Teaching Museum at Skidmore College.
