= Boulsa =

- Provincial Capital
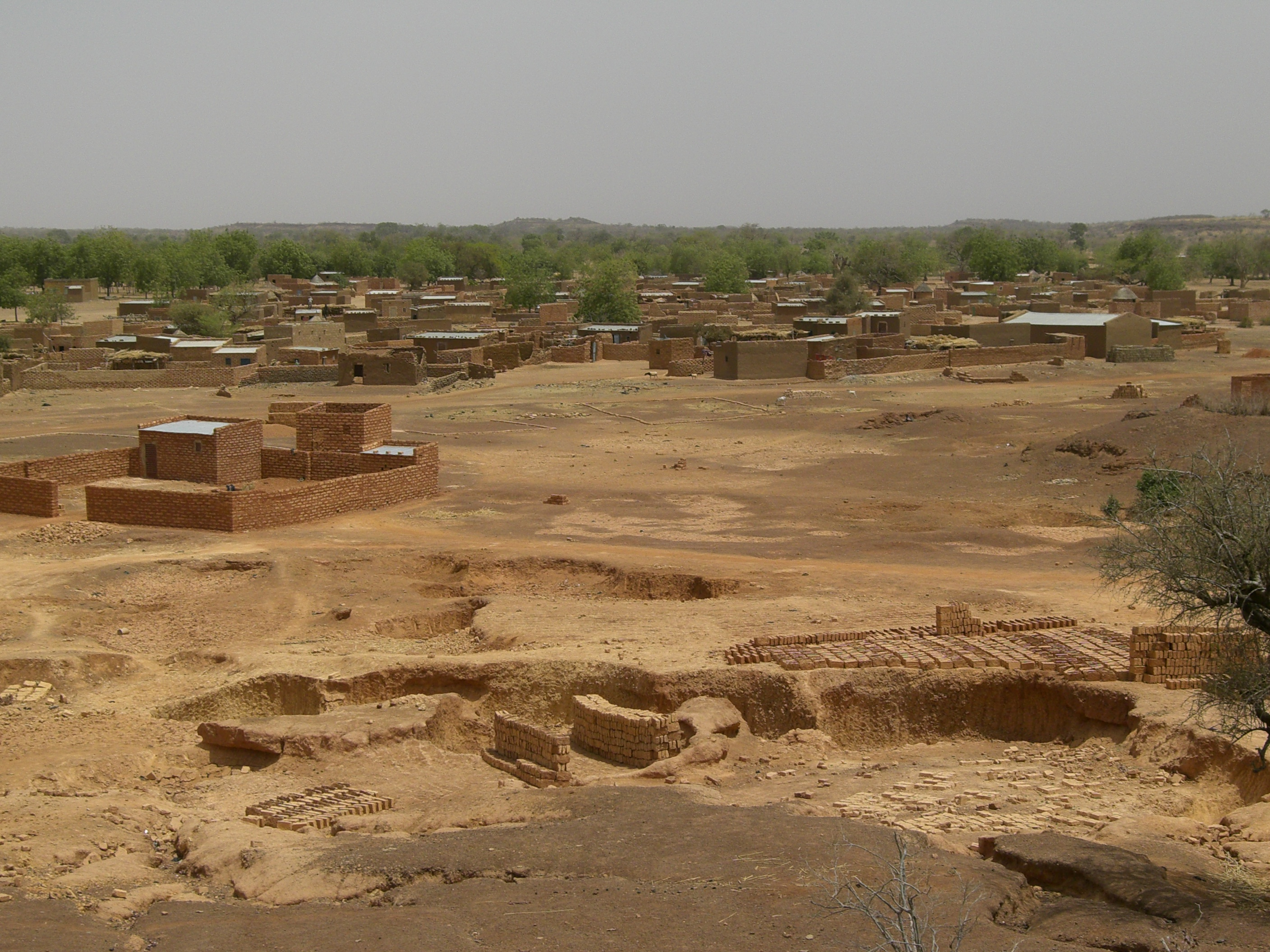

- Location within Burkina Faso
- Coordinates: 12°40′N 0°35′W
- Country: Burkina Faso
- Region: Centre-Nord
- Province: Namentenga
- Elevation: 305 m (1,001 ft)

Population (2019 census)
  - Total: 24,200
- Time zone: UTC+0 (GMT)

Boulsa is the capital of Namentenga Province in Burkina Faso. It is predominantly Mossi with small populations of Fula and Gulmanche peoples.

== Education ==
Le Lycée Provincial de Boulsa is the main high school catering to approximately 1300 students (2008). The Collège d'Ensignment Technique Professionnelle de Boulsa, Collège Gues-Wende and a Catholic CEG also provide 6ème through 3ème. There are also several primary schools.

== Economy ==
Market day occurs every three days regardless of the day of the week. It is host to a regional office for Plan International.

== Notable people ==
- Pierre Sandwidi – singer and musician
