= Yalgo, Kongoussi =

Village in Kongoussi Department, Burkina Faso

Yalgo
- Location in Burkina Faso
- Coordinates: 13°28′N 1°33′W
- Country: Burkina Faso
- Region: Centre-Nord Region
- Province: Bam Province
- Department: Kongoussi Department

Population (2019)
  - Total: 2,248
- Time zone: UTC+0 (GMT 0)

Yalgo or Yargo is a town in the Kongoussi Department of Bam Province in northern Burkina Faso.

Population
Year	Pop.	±%
2006	1,440	—
2019	2,248	+56.1%
