= Namentenga Province =

Coordinates: 13°15′N 0°35′W

Namentenga
- Province
- Location in Burkina Faso

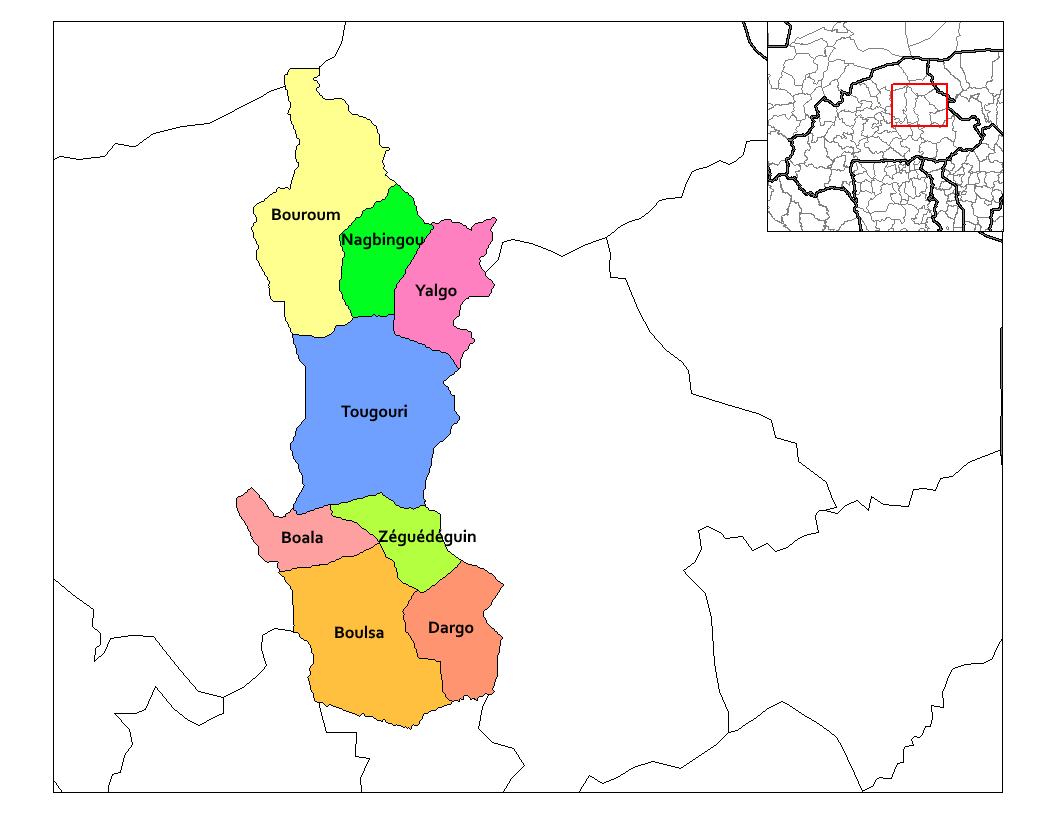
- Provincial map of its departments
- Country: Burkina Faso
- Region: Centre-Nord Region
- Capital: Boulsa

Area
  - Province: 6,466 km^{2} (2,497 sq mi)

Population (2019 census)
  - Province: 512,529
  - Density: 79.27/km^{2} (205.3/sq mi)
  - Urban: 24,200
- Time zone: UTC+0 (GMT 0)

Namentenga is one of the 45 provinces of Burkina Faso, located in its Centre-Nord Region.

Its capital is Boulsa.

== Departments ==
Namentenga is divided into 8 departments:

- Boala
- Boulsa
- Bouroum
- Dargo
- Nagbingou
- Tougouri
- Yalgo
- Zéguédéguin

== See also ==
- Regions of Burkina Faso
- Provinces of Burkina Faso
- Communes of Burkina Faso
