= List of defunct airlines of Ghana =

This is a list of defunct airlines of Ghana.

Airline	Image	IATA	ICAO	Callsign	Commenced operations	Ceased operations	Notes
Aero Surveys Ghana		S9	IKM	EASY SHUTTLE	1997	2009	Rebranded Air Shuttle Ghana. Operated Embraer Bandeirante
Aerogem Cargo			GCK		2000	2004	Rebranded Aerogem Aviation
Afra Airlines			UAG	AFRALINE	2003	2005	
AfraCityLink					2005	2005	
Air Charter Express		P4	ACE		2007	2009	Rebranded from Cargoplus Aviation (2003-2007), became Meridian Airways
Air Futures Airlines					2012	2018	Renamed to Unity Air
Air Shuttle Ghana					2009	2011	Rebranded as Starbow Airlines
Air Transafrik		PQ	TRF	TRANSFRIK	1984	2005	Operated BAC One-Eleven, Lockheed L-100
Airlift International of Ghana			ALE		2008	2015	Operated Douglas DC-8
Al-Waha Aviation					1997	1998	Operated Boeing 707-321C
Analinda Airlines					1995	2001	Operated Boeing 707-320C, Douglas DC-8-50, HS Andover, HS 748
Antrak Air		O4	ABV	ANTRAK	2001	2012	
Ashanti Airline Aviation					1985	1995	
Baby Jet Airlines					2017	2019	Not launched
Cargo Plus Airlines		8L	CGP		2003	2004	Merged with Race Cargo Airlines to form Cargoplus Aviation
Cargoplus Aviation			ACE		2003	2007	Rebranded as Air Charter Express
CiTylinK			CTQ	CITYLINK	2003	2012	
CiTylinK Airlines			CTQ		1994	2003	Renamed to CiTylinK
Clipper International					1999	1999	Operated Boeing 707-320
Continental Cargo Airlines			CCL	CONTICAL	1990	2001	Operated Boeing 707-320C, Boeing 727, Douglas DC-8-62
DAC International Airlines		OP	DIG		2018	2018	Rebranded PassionAir. Operated DHC-8-400
Eagle Atlantic Airlines		E2	EAB		2013	2014	
Excelsior Airlines			ESR		1987	1992	Operated a leased Ilyushin Il-18
Fan Airways			FGH	FANAIR	1997	1999	Operated Beech 1900
Fly540 Ghana		5G			2010	2014	Rebranded Royal Fly-GH
Geminair		GP	GAL		1974	1988	Renamed to Gemini Airlines
Gemini Airlines			GAL	GOLF PAPA	1974	1981	Operated Boeing 707-320, Bristol Britannia
General Mediterranean Airlines					1990	2001	Formed by General Mediterranean Holding. Operated Boeing 707-320C, Boeing 727-200, Douglas DC-8-60
Ghana Airlink					2000	2000	Operated Fokker F27
Ghana Airways		GH	GHA		1958	2005	
Ghana Airways Airtours					1974	1979	
Ghana International Airlines		G0	GHB		2004	2010	
Golden Airways			GOG		1996	1998	
Goldstar Air					2017		Renamed to Goldstar Airlines. Not launched
Imperial Cargo Airlines			IMG	IMPERIAL AIRLINES	1991	1999	Operated Boeing 707-321C
Jason Air			GTY		1996	1997	Operated Boeing 707-320
Johnsons Air			JON	JOHNSONS AIR	1995	2008	Cargo carrier
Meridian Airways			MAG	MERID AIR	2009	2015	
MK Airlines		7G	BGB	BRITISH GLOBAL	1997	1999	
Muk Air			MUG	MUGGAN	1997	1999	Operated Swearingen Merlin IV, Short 330
Orlando Cargo Airline					2011	2014	
Phoenix Aviation					1981	1995	Operated Boeing 707
Pioneer Air Charter Services					1974	1974	Renamed to Pioneer
Race Cargo Airlines			RCN	RACE	1990	2003	
Rainbow Air Cargo			RBO		1989	1990	Renamed to Race Cargo Airlines
Rossair					2004	2005	
Royal Ghanaian Airlines			RGA		2004	2005	
Smile Air					2016		Not launched
Sobel Air			SBL		2001	2007	
Southern Aviation			STV		1982	1997	
Starbow		S9	IKM	EASY SHUTTLE	2011	2017	
Transafrican Air Cargo					1985	1985	Operated Boeing 707-320C
West Africa Air Cargo		KY	WCB	KILO YANKEE	1977	1978	Renamed to West Africa Airlines. Operated Nord Noratlas, Vickers Viscount
West Africa Airlines		KY	WCB	KILO YANKEE	1978	1984	Established as West Africa Air Cargo
West African Airways Corporation					1947	1958	
West Coast Airlines		WI	WCG	WHISKEY INDIA	1980	1988	Operated Boeing 707

== See also ==
- List of airlines of Ghana
- List of airports in Ghana
