= Royal Fly-GH =

Ghanaian airline

| IATA | ICAO | Call sign |
|---|---|---|
| 5G | FOX | SWIFT TANGO |
- Founded: 10 November 2008 as Fly540 Ghana
- Commenced operations: November 2011
- Ceased operations: 2017
- AOC #: ACL# 0215 AOC# 28
- Hubs: Accra International Airport
- Destinations: 4
- Headquarters: Cantonments, Accra
- Key people: Samuel Palmer Wesley-Quaison (President); Frederick Osei Taylor (Director); Captain Edwin Reed Harley (Director); Hannah Roberts-Blankson (Director)
- Website: fly-gh.com

Royal Fly-GH was a Ghanaian airline based at Accra International Airport in Accra. Previously using the name Fly540 Ghana, it suspended operations in May 2014. It planned to resume flights by first quarter of 2019, but did not restart operations.

== History ==
Royal Fly-GH was founded as Fly540 Ghana, a subsidiary of Fly540, on 11 November 2008. It began operations in November 2011, flying to Accra, Tamale, Kumasi, and Takoradi.

In June 2012, Fly540 and its subsidiaries were acquired by Rubicon Diversified Investments, which intended to absorb the airlines into its new venture Fastjet. However, in May 2014 Fastjet decided to suspend Fly540 Ghana's operations, as it needed to transition the airline's full-service model to Fastjet's low-cost one. In addition, Fastjet then sold off Fly540 Ghana's fleet, a single ATR 72-500.

In June 2015, Fastjet sold Fly540 Ghana to DWG-G Co Ltd for only USD1.00. Within a week of the decision, the Ghana Civil Aviation Authority (GCAA) announced the airline would be rebranded as Royal Fly-GH and would soon resume operations. The resumption of service was expected to occur in October 2015, and then was thought to have been possible by the third quarter of 2016. However, Citi Business News reported in June 2016 that the resumption might be delayed as Royal Fly-GH had yet to complete the processes for further clearance from the GCAA.

== Corporate affairs ==
Royal Fly-GH is owned by Samuel Palmer Wesley-Quaison, a Ghanaian businessman based in Germany and Ghana. From 2010 to 2012 it was a subsidiary of Fly540 (owned by Lonrho Aviation), and from 2012 to 2015 it was owned by Fastjet/Rubicon Diversified Investments.

== Destinations ==
Royal Fly-GH planned fly to the same destinations that Fly540 Ghana flew to. It also planned to explore international destinations.

| Country | City | Airport | Notes |
|---|---|---|---|
| Ghana | Accra | Accra International Airport | Hub |
| Ghana | Kumasi | Kumasi Airport | |
| Ghana | Takoradi | Takoradi Airport | |
| Ghana | Tamale | Tamale Airport | |

== Fleet ==
Royal Fly-GH has no aircraft, as its sole aircraft, an ATR 72-500, was sold off by Fastjet during the suspension.

== See also ==
- Fly540
- List of airlines of Ghana
