= Goldstar Air =

Ghanaian airline

- Founded: 2014
- Hubs: Accra International Airport (Accra)
- Key people: Eric Bannerman, CEO
- Website: flygoldstar.com

Goldstar Air was a planned Ghanaian airline to be based at Accra International Airport in Accra. It planned to launch flights to both regional and long-haul destinations, but never commenced operations. As of 2021, the airline is no longer listed as having a valid Air Carrier License by Ghana Civil Aviation Authority.

The company has repeatedly been recognized as among the most notorious "fake airlines" of the world as it failed to commence operations despite numerous public statements and advertisements. In 2017, Ghana Civil Aviation Authority released a statement advising the public not to do business with Goldstar Air since the company lacked any operating permit.

Goldstar Air claimed to be a strategic partner of the Government of Liberia to establish Lone Star Air in 2020 as the national airline of Liberia, but that carrier also failed to commence operations.

== History ==
Goldstar Air was founded in 2014 as Goldstar Airlines. It said it would begin operations on 13 June 2014 with twice-weekly flights to Baltimore in the United States and London–Gatwick, followed by Guangzhou, China and Natal in Brazil. The airline said it would use McDonnell Douglas MD-11 and Boeing 747 aircraft. However, the launch date was postponed to late July 2014 before being indefinitely postponed, as the airline was still awaiting certification from the GCAA.

Goldstar Air experienced delays in receiving certification from the GCAA. In September 2014, it appealed to President John Dramani Mahama for help, as the GCAA had still not inspected the airline's aircraft and facilities in the United States. In July 2015, Goldstar Air threatened to stage a protest in Accra against the GCAA, after the GCAA allowed South African Airways to operate the same route Goldstar Air had applied for (Accra to Washington, D.C.). However, the protest was avoided when Minister for Transport Dzifa Ativor ordered the GCAA to inspect Goldstar Air's aircraft.

In January 2016, the airline announced it would begin a training programme for flight attendants. Goldstar Air said it would employ local Ghanaian flight attendants but would initially employ expatriates for the cockpit crew. In June 2016, Goldstar Air said it was working on obtaining its Air Carrier Licence, after which it would receive its air operator's certificate and commence operations by the third quarter of the year. The airline secured incentives from Baltimore Airport authorities in preparation for Goldstar Air's planned flights to the airport. Goldstar Air later said that it would use the Diamond Hangar FBO at London Stansted Airport as a maintenance facility and employee training school.

In August 2016, Goldstar Air announced that it had purchased three aircraft, which needed to be inspected by the GCAA. The following September, the GCAA released a notice advising customers not to do business with the airline, stating that Goldstar had begun to advertise its services despite lacking an operating permit.

In October 2020, Goldstar Air signed a strategic partnership agreement with the Government of Liberia to revive the national carrier under the "Lone Star Air" brand.

As of March 2022, the airline was no longer listed as having a valid Air Carrier License by Ghana Civil Aviation Authority.

Despite not actually existing, Goldstar Air continues to sponsor award ceremonies to confer awards upon themselves. In 2022, they sponsored the "Ghana Aviation News Awards" which in turn awarded them with the "Emerging Airline Company of the Year" award.

== Destinations ==
The airline planned to launch flights between Accra and Baltimore. Other destinations under consideration included London and various West African cities.

Country	City	Airport	Notes	Refs
United Kingdom	London	Heathrow Airport		
United States	Baltimore	Baltimore Washington International Airport		
United States	Providence	TF Green International Airport		
United States	Atlanta	Hartsfield-Jackson Atlanta International Airport		
United States	Houston	George Bush Intercontinental Airport		
United States	Columbus	John Glenn Columbus International Airport		
Liberia	Monrovia	Roberts International Airport		
Nigeria	Lagos	Murtala Muhammed International Airport		
Sierra Leone	Freetown	Lungi International Airport		
Senegal	Dakar	Blaise Diagne International Airport		
The Gambia	Banjul	Banjul International Airport		
Guinea	Conakry	Conakry International Airport		
China	Guangzhou	Guangzhou International Airport		
(United Arab Emirates) Dubai	Dubai	Dubai International Airport		
Ghana	Accra	Accra International Airport	Hub	
Ghana	Tamale	Tamale Airport		

== Fleet ==
Goldstar Air said that it planned to operate two Boeing 737-300s and three Boeing 777-200s as well as up to forty Airbus A380.

It projected a fleet of more than 100 modern aircraft.

The aircraft were planned to be named after former Presidents of Ghana.

- 9G-AKUFFOADDO
- 9G-JOHNMAHAMA
- 9G-ATTAMILLS
- 9G-JOHNKUFFUOR
- 9G-JERRYJOHNRAWLINGS

In October 2020, Goldstar Air announced that it would also name an aircraft as 9G-H.E.GEORGEOPPONGWEAH in honour of George Weah, the President of Liberia.

== Maintenance ==
Goldstar Air announced its intention to conduct maintenance on its fleet at Tamale Airport. It said it had named its planned maintenance hangar after the National Chief Imam, Sheikh Dr. Alhaji Nuhu Sharabatu.

== See also ==
- List of defunct airlines of Ghana
