= Smile Air =

IATA	ICAO	Call sign
?	?	?
- Founded: 2014
- Hubs: Accra International Airport (Accra)
- Fleet size: 0 (68 planned)
- Key people: Alexander Nwuba, CEO; Andrew Fuller, Director
- Website: gosmileair.com (no longer active)

Smile Air was a planned Ghanaian airline based at Accra International Airport in Accra. It planned to use Xian MA600 and MA700 aircraft to fly to destinations throughout West and Central Africa. The airline failed to obtain certification and licenses from Ghana Civil Aviation Authority.

== History ==
Smile Air initially planned to operate long-haul flights to cities in Asia, Europe, and the Middle East using Boeing 747 aircraft. Two former Mahan Air Boeing 747s were leased from a UAE based private equity company and repainted in Smile Air's livery. However, Smile Air dropped these plans in November 2015, instead deciding to focus on regional flights using smaller aircraft.

In December 2015, the airline placed a provisional order for 68 Xian MA600 and MA700 aircraft, costing over US$1.2 billion.

UAE based founding director Andrew Fuller resigned from Smile Air on 24 April 2017.

As of December 2019, Smile Air was still undergoing certification from the GCAA, a process it began in 2014.

== Destinations ==
From its Accra hub, Smile Air planned to fly to cities across West and Central Africa.

== Fleet ==
Smile Air planned to operate 68 Xian MA600 and MA700 aircraft. The aircraft were planned to be delivered between 2016 and 2021 at a rate of 10–12 aircraft annually, although no deliveries actually took place.

Smile Air fleet
Aircraft	In service	Orders	Passengers	Notes
Xian MA600 and MA700	–	68	?	deliveries 2016–2021

== See also ==
- List of defunct airlines of Ghana
