= Citylink (Ghana) =

Airline in Ghana (1994–2013)

Citylink Airlines
IATA	ICAO	Call sign
—	CTQ	CITYLINK
- Founded: 1994
- Ceased operations: 2013
- Hubs: Accra International Airport
- Parent company: Egyptair
- Headquarters: Accra, Ghana

CTK CiTylinK was an airline based in Accra, Ghana.

== Background ==
CTK offered Executive Air Charters, Air Ambulance, Aerial Photography services in West Africa. They provided training and rating courses on all aircraft in the CTK fleet.

CTK Maintenance provided all maintenance for SAAB, Let, Cessna, Beechcraft and Turbo Thrush aircraft. Services are also available for other aircraft users and operators. While active, CTK Maintenance had the only NICAD battery service station available in Ghana.

== History ==
CTK Citylink had been in existence for 16 years and was the oldest operating airline in Ghana. Scheduled domestic flights in Ghana were introduced in 1994 under the name CiTylinK Airlines. Commercial flights were suspended in August 2012.

== Sale ==
CTK has announced that 49.9% of the airline will be acquired by Egyptair in the near future.

== Former destinations ==
- Ghana
  - Accra - Accra International Airport
  - Kumasi - Kumasi Airport
  - Sunyani - Sunyani Airport
  - Takoradi - Takoradi Airport
  - Tamale - Tamale Airport

== Fleet ==
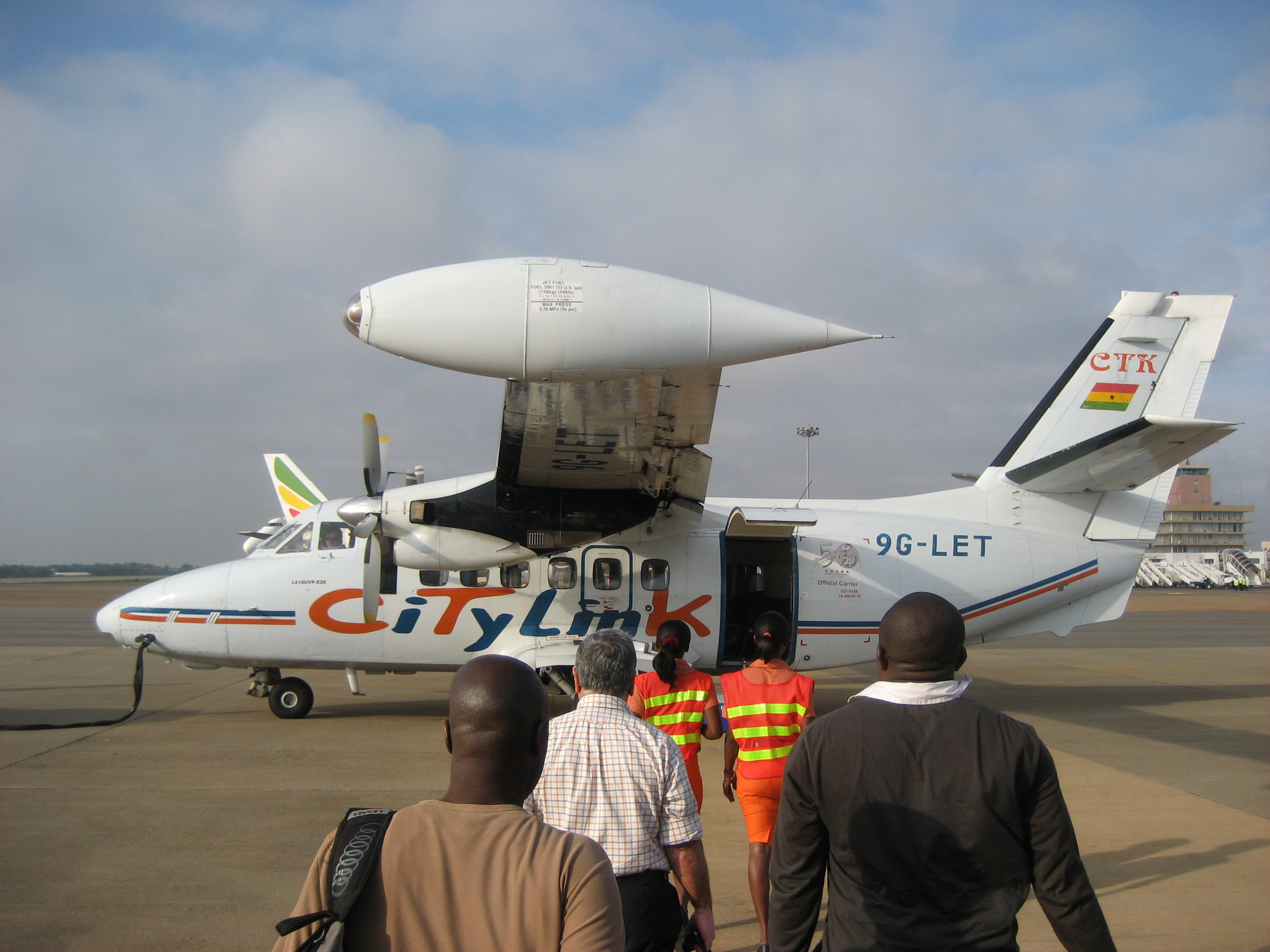
CiTylinK Let L-410 at Kumasi Airport (September 2008).

The CTK – CiTylinK fleet included the following aircraft:

- 1 Beechcraft Baron
- 2 Cessna 172
- 1 Cessna 175
- 1 Cessna 206
- 1 Cessna 414
- 1 Hawker 900XP
