= Starbow =

Ghanaian airline (2012–2017)

IATA	ICAO	Call sign
S9	IKM	EASY SHUTTLE
- Founded: 1995 (as Aero Surveys Limited)
- Ceased operations: November 2017
- Operating bases: Accra International Airport
- Fleet size: 1 (November 2017)
- Destinations: 3 (November 2017)
- Headquarters: Accra, Greater Accra, Ghana
- Key people: James Eric Antwi (CEO)
- Website: www.flystarbow.com

Aero Surveys Limited, which traded as Starbow, was a privately owned airline in Ghana that operated from 2012 till 2017.

It operated scheduled services beginning in 2012, but suspended all operations following an accident involving one of its ATR 72-500s in November 2017.

== History ==
=== Origins and rebranding ===
The company was originally incorporated in October 1997 as Aero Surveys Limited and later rebranded its activities as Air Shuttle. It operated two Embraer EMB 110 Bandeirante aircraft for domestic charters and air taxi services, gaining its Air Operator's Certificate (AOC), in August 2009.

In 2011, the ownership of the airline changed, which resulted in a further rebranding to a new commercial name, Starbow, with regional flights in mind. A communication and recruitment campaign was launched and two 94 seat BAe 146-300 jet aircraft were acquired for scheduled domestic passenger services.

Starbow began domestic flights out of Accra International Airport on 26 September 2011, serving Kumasi and Tamale. The aircraft offered both business and economy class seating. Starbow added its 3rd destination on 8 November 2011, with return flights to Takoradi from its Accra base.

=== Expansion plans curtailed ===
On 3 February 2012, after just five months in operation, Starbow announced that they had finalised a deal to lease two additional BAe 146-300 aircraft that would double their fleet size to four aircraft. The aircraft entered into service less than 6 months later.

Starbow's first international route was announced on 31 July 2012. The up to 5 times weekly service from Accra to Cotonou in Benin started 13 August 2012. Abidjan in the Ivory Coast became the carrier's second international destination. The route launched on 8 November 2012 with flights operating up to 5 times weekly from Accra. Starbow also expressed ambitions for further regional routes to be provided.

Starbow announced on 16 December 2012 that they were adding a 97-seat BAe 146-200 to their fleet.

However, in early 2013 all international services were suspended due to poor performance. In November 2013, press reports said that Starbow were to go ahead with fleet renewal plans following the recent appointment of an agent to dispose of the current fleet of two BAe 146-300s and one BAe 146–200, with the third BAe 146-300 being sold for parts. Collectively, the aircraft average 25 years of age. Starbow was reportedly still considering its options for potential replacement aircraft.

Also in November 2013, Starbow's CEO James Eric Antwi said they would move their business out of Ghana if the Government does not address the concerns of domestic airlines, citing small market size and low fares as some of their concerns, and saying that Starbow could relocate their business to other countries such as the Ivory Coast.

=== Operations suspended ===
As a consequence of an accident on 25 November 2017, all of Starbow's operations were suspended.

== Destinations ==
Starbow linked its Accra hub to Kumasi, Takoradi and Tamale as of November 2017.

== Fleet ==
Starbow operated the following aircraft as of August 2018:

=== Historical fleet ===
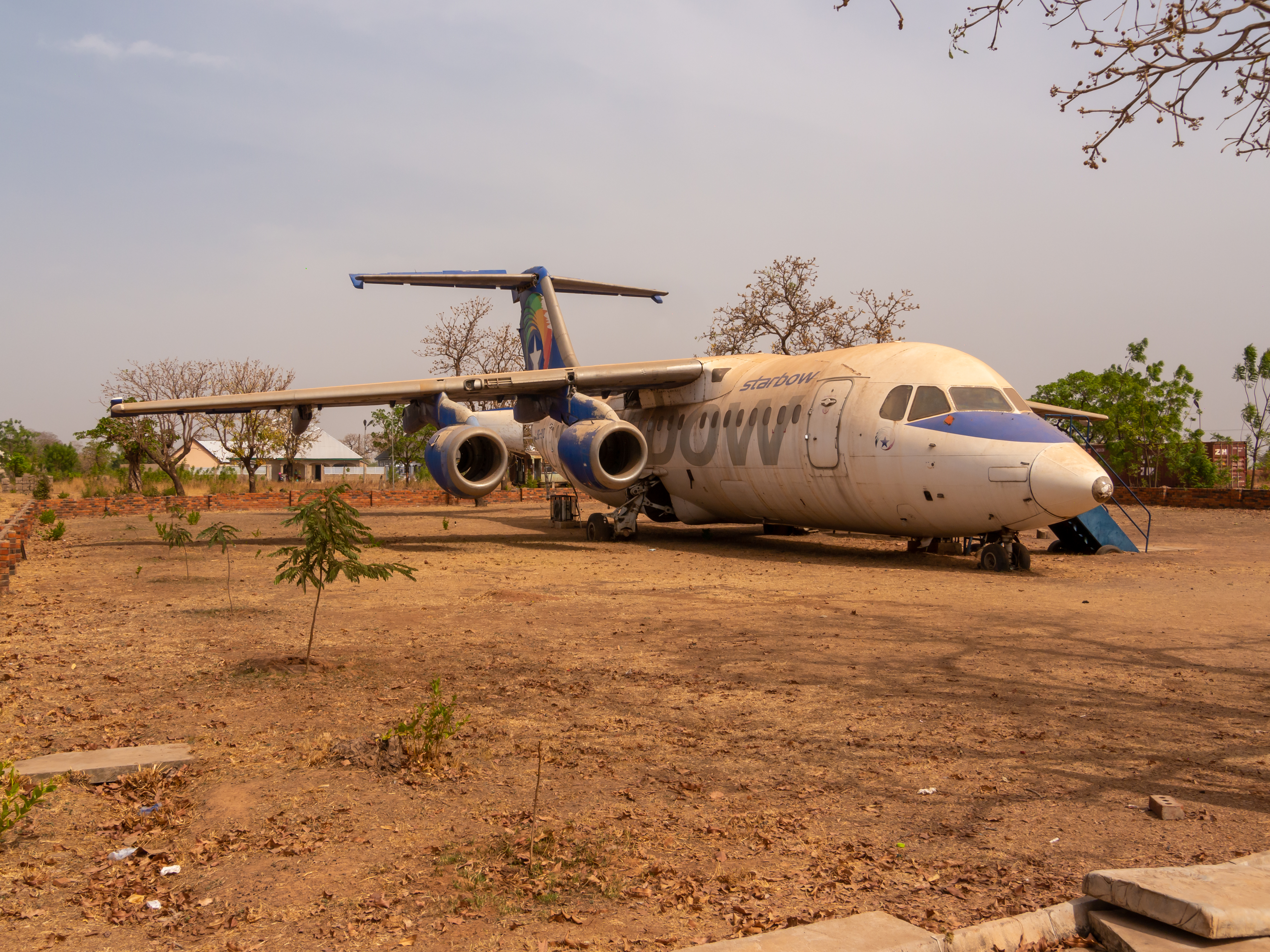
BAe 146-200 of Starbow

- ATR 72
- 6 BAe 146-100
- BAe 146-200
- BAe 146-300

== Accidents and incidents ==
- On 9 August 2014, a Starbow BAe 146-300, flight S9-100 to Kumasi, was climbing out of Accra when one of the right hand engines emitted a loud bang and streaks of flames prompting the crew to shut the engine down and return to Accra.
- On 28 October 2014, a Starbow BAe 146-200 from Accra to Takoradi Airport with 77 people on board suffered a hydraulic failure during climbout. The crew were forced to make a landing without flaps, resulting in damage to the landing gear and a fire. Two persons were injured in the resulting emergency evacuation. The aircraft was written off. Ghana Civil Aviation Authority subsequently grounded the airline temporarily following this accident.
- On 6 October 2015, a Starbow BAe 146-300 from Accra to Tamale overran the end of runway 23 on landing resulting in the collapse of the nose gear. There were no major injuries, but the aircraft sustained significant damage and was written off.
- On 25 November 2017, a Starbow ATR 72-500 was preparing for take-off from Accra bound for Kumasi during heavy rain. While the aircraft was picking up speed down the runway, the captain's seat slid backwards, causing the ATR to lose control and swerve off the runway before coming to a halt. Five of the occupants were injured in the incident. The aircraft was written off with significant damage. Starbow suspended all flights in response to the incident and terminated operations shortly thereafter.
