= Eagle Atlantic Airlines =

IATA	ICAO	Call sign
E2	EAB	—
- Founded: October 2013
- Ceased operations: 2014
- Hubs: Accra International Airport
- Fleet size: 1
- Destinations: 5
- Headquarters: Accra, Ghana
- Website: www.eagleatlanticairlines.com

Eagle Atlantic Airlines was a short-lived Ghanaian airline based in Accra. It commenced operations in October 2013 and ceased in 2014.

== History ==
Eagle Atlantic Airlines received its Air Operation Certificate (AOC) in August 2013 and was the first wholly owned Ghanaian flag carrier after Ghana Airways and Ghana International Airlines ceased operations.

It ceased all operations in 2014.

== Destinations ==
The airline flies to five international destinations.

Hub
Future
Terminated destination

City	Country	IATA	ICAO	Airport	Refs
Abidjan	Côte d'Ivoire	ABJ	DIAP	Port Bouet Airport	
Accra	Ghana	ACC	DGAA	Accra International Airport	
Dakar	Senegal	DRK	GFLL	Léopold Sédar Senghor International Airport	
Freetown	Sierra Leone	FNA	GOOY	Lungi International Airport	
Monrovia	Liberia	ROB	GLRB	Roberts International Airport	

== Fleet ==
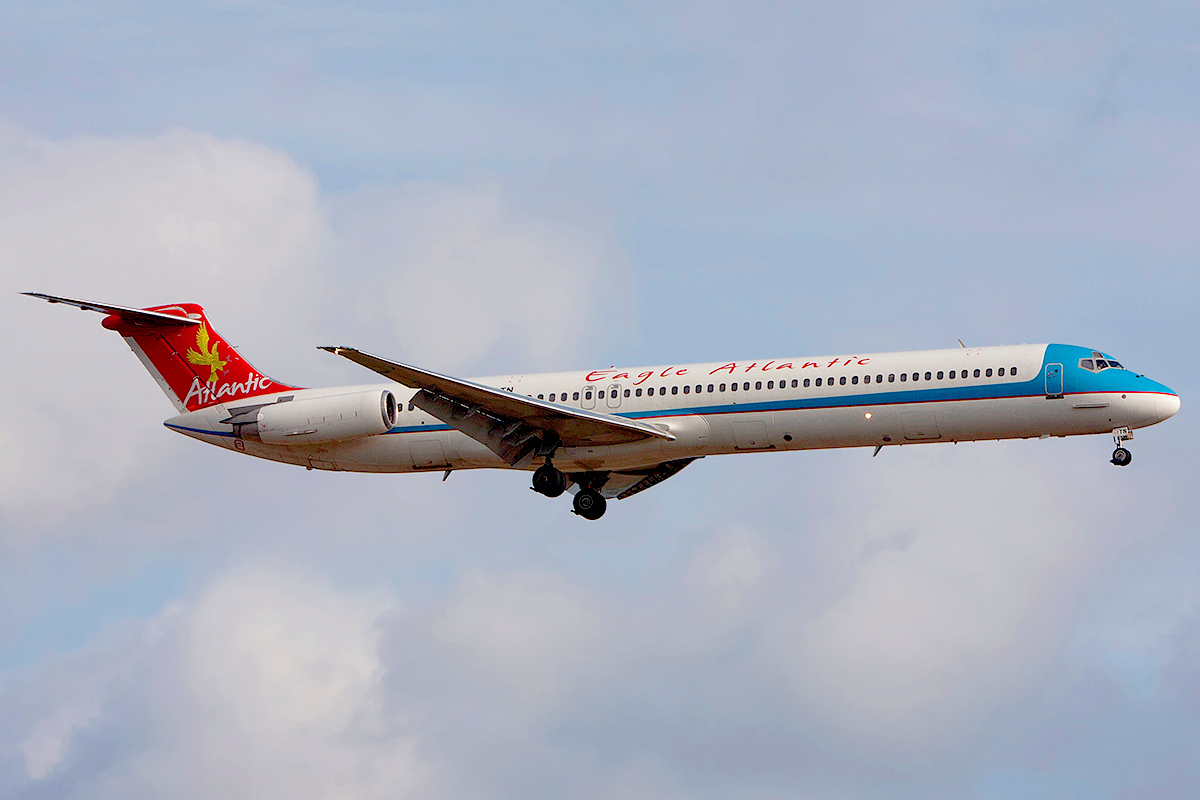
Eagle Atlantic Airlines' McDonnell Douglas MD-82, 2013

As of December 2015, the Eagle Atlantic Airlines fleet consisted of the following aircraft:

Eagle Atlantic Airlines fleet
Aircraft	In fleet	Orders	Passengers
McDonnell Douglas MD-82	2	—	147
Total	2	0	
