= List of airlines of Ghana =

This is a list of airlines currently operating in Ghana.

Airline	IATA	ICAO	Callsign	Image	Commenced operations	Notes
Africa World Airlines	AW	AFW	BLACKSTAR		2012	
Air Ghana		GHN	AIR GHANA		2014	Cargo; flies the DHL Livery
Gianair		GIN	GIANAIR		2009	
Goldstar Air	GD	GOD	GOLD GHANA		2020	
Passion Air	OP	DIG	Passion		2018	
Royal Fly-GH	5G	FOX	SWIFT TANGO		2011	Originally Fly540 Ghana, will resume operations under new name

== See also ==
- List of airlines
- List of defunct airlines of Ghana
