= FBJ =

FBJ may refer to:

- Baby Jet Airlines, the ICAO code FBJ
- Swedish Air Force Rangers or Flygbasjägarna, an elite specialist ground unit of the Swedish Air Force
- Finkel-Biskis-Jinkins murine sarcoma virus, on the List of virus species
