= Ghana Airways =

National airline of Ghana, 1958–2004

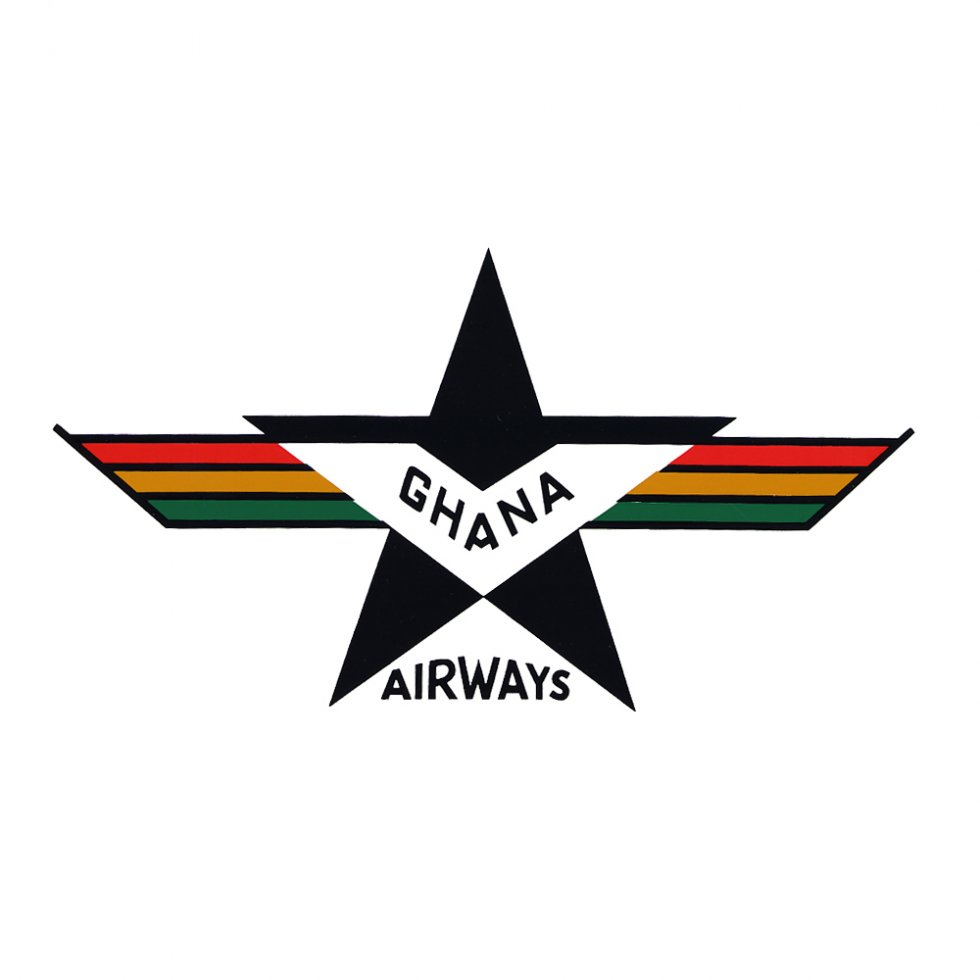
IATA	ICAO	Call sign
GH	GHA	GHANA
- Founded: 4 July 1958
- Commenced operations: 16 July 1958
- Ceased operations: June 2005
- Hubs: Accra International Airport
- Fleet size: 2
- Destinations: 4
- Parent company: Government of Ghana
- Headquarters: Accra, Ghana
- Website: ghanaairways.com (Archive)

Ghana Airways Limited was the flag carrier of Ghana from 1958 to 2005, with its main base of operation and hub at Accra International Airport in Accra. The airline ceased operations in June 2005, although plans were discussed to revive it in 2020 in partnership with Egyptair.

== History ==
=== Formative years ===
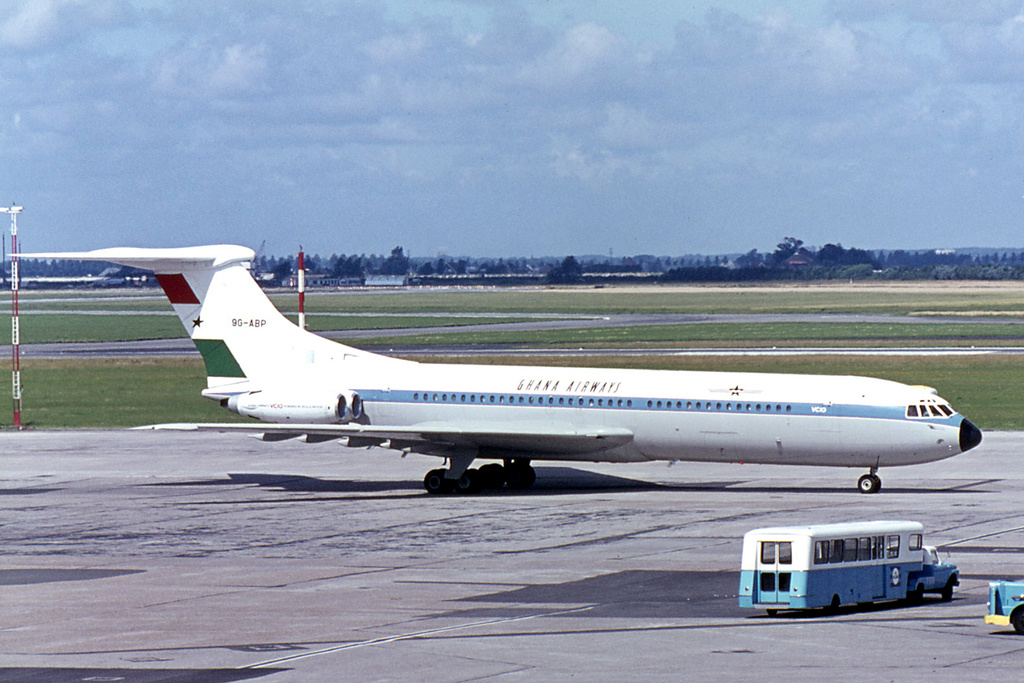
A Ghana Airways Vickers VC-10 at Amsterdam Schiphol Airport in 1965

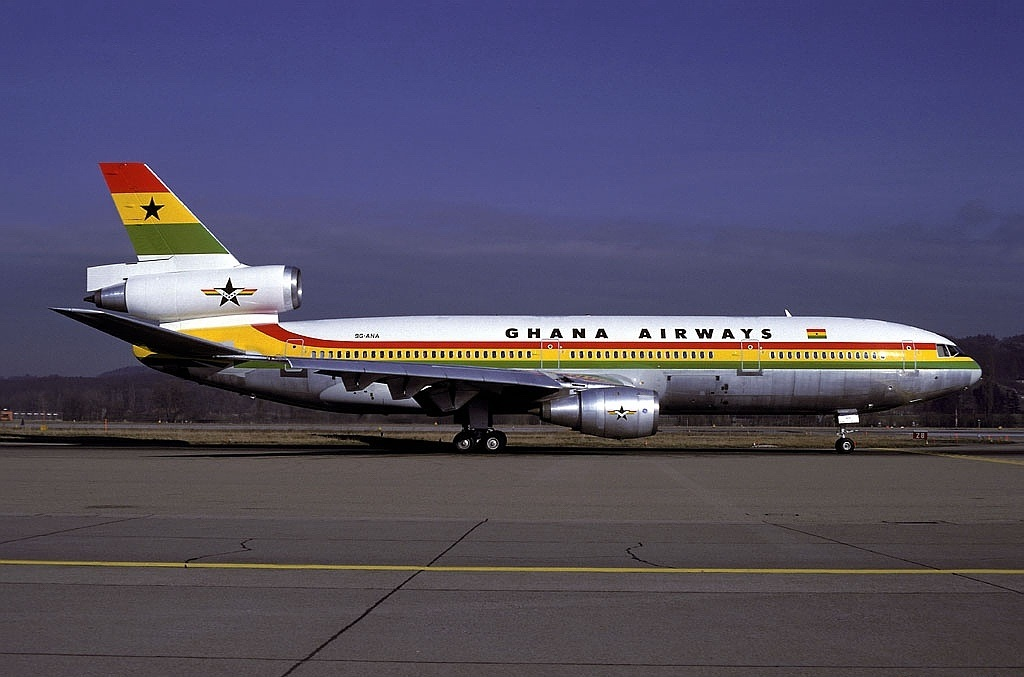
A Ghana Airways McDonnell Douglas DC-10-30 at Zürich Airport in 1988

Ghana Airways was founded on 4 July 1958 by the government of Ghana with a start-up capital of £400,000, with the government holding a 60 percent stake and BOAC holding the remainder. When the company was founded, a seven-year agreement between the airline and BOAC was signed, which saw BOAC personnel being seconded to Accra, and Ghanaian personnel being trained in order for them to take over management and operation of the airline. Prior to the foundation of the company, BOAC and West African Airways Corporation were responsible for international services from Ghana, operating pool services from West Africa to London. For their initial operations, Ghana Airways joined the pool services, when BOAC began operating the Accra–London route on 16 July 1958 with a Boeing 377 Stratocruiser, with the aircraft being operated with the Ghanaian flag and in a livery minimally adapted from that of the UK carrier. The airline's relationship with West African Airways ceased on 30 September, and on 1 October they began operating the domestic and regional flights formerly offered by WAAC. The airline's first aircraft, and hence the first aircraft to be registered in Ghana since the nation became independent, was a de Havilland Heron delivered on 30 December. At the end of the airline's first year of operation they had made a net profit of US$28,000.

A second Heron was delivered to the airline in 1959, and on 9 March, the first Douglas DC-3 entered service. Flights to London employed Bristol Britannia 102s wet-leased from BOAC from 16 April, leading to a reduction in Stratocruiser services and the retirement of the type after its final departure for London, via Barcelona, on 31 August. (BOAC's own Stratocruiser services on the route had ceased on 31 May.) By the end of 1959, an order for two Britannias was placed and a service to Conakry was introduced. In 1960, three Vickers Viscounts were ordered on 20 April. Ghanaian President Kwame Nkrumah was accused of being too aligned to the West, and hence he entered into agreements with the Soviets and on 18 August, six Ilyushin Il-18s, at a cost of £670,000 each, were ordered. After having initially expected to be delivered on 20 November, the first two of six Il-18s was delivered to Accra on 3 December and were initially crewed and maintained by Soviet personnel while Ghanaian personnel were trained. The aircraft entered service on routes from Accra to Lagos and Dakar, to Addis Ababa via Kano, and Nairobi via Léopoldville. Net profits for the year 1960 totaled US$462,000. In November 1960, the USSR also delivered a single Antonov An-12 to Ghana Airways.

The airline placed an order with Boeing in January 1961 for two Rolls-Royce Conway-powered Boeing 707-420s, and an order was also placed for three Vickers VC10s. The order for the two Boeings, valued at US$17,500,000, saw the airline planning flights to the United States from July 1962, with additional plans to begin flights to Tokyo and Sydney. A weekly Britannia service to Beirut, via Kano and Cairo, was inaugurated on 4 February 1961, making Ghana Airways the first West African airline to serve the Lebanese capital.

It was reported in January 1961 that the Nkrumah administration desired minimal foreign influence in Ghanaian affairs and saw Ghana Airways as a prime symbol of Ghana's statehood. On 14 February 1961, the Ghanaian government reached an agreement with BOAC to buy the latter out of their 40% share in the airline for a reported £160,000. The check was presented to Sir Duncan Cumming on 15 February, who at the same time signed a contract renewing the management assistance contract, which dated back to July 1958. On delivery of the second Britannia, in December 1960, the new turboprops took over service from the wet-leased BOAC aircraft on the airline's route to London. In June 1961, Ghana Airways commenced the first-ever non-stop Accra-London air connection, also using Britannias, and in July the government announced that the airline would be reorganized. The order for two Boeing 707s, which had been placed in January 1961, was cancelled in August due to difficulties in financing the purchase; in 1961 the airline lost US$800,000. The airline took delivery of the three Viscounts and an additional two Il-18s in 1962, for a total of eight Ilyushins. A weekly flight from Accra to Kumasi, Tamale, Ouagadougou, Mopti, Ségou and Bamako was inaugurated on 4 July 1962 utilising a Douglas DC-3. The pool arrangement with BOAC was terminated in November 1962, three years before its expected July 1965 expiry, after Ghana Airways signed a pool agreement with Alitalia covering flights between Accra and Rome. BOAC saw this arrangement with the Italian airline to be in competition with their agreement with the Ghanaian airline, under which Ghana Airways would be required to sell tickets for both airlines on the Accra-London route, which in the case of the Alitalia would be operated via Rome. By January 1963 the relationship with BOAC was almost nonexistent, as British United Airways took over general sales agent duties for the airline in the United Kingdom and Cunard Eagle was responsible for major maintenance on the airlines' aircraft. However, BOAC continued to provide passenger ground handling services for the airline at Heathrow Airport. By this time, the airline was operating domestic flights from Accra to Kumasi, Takoradi and Tamale, with regional flights being operated to Abidjan, Bamako, Bathurst, Conakry, Dakar, Freetown, Lagos and Monrovia. The airlines' international route network saw the airline flying to Addis Ababa, Beirut, Cairo, Khartoum, London, Rabat, Rome and Zürich.

Flights to Asmara were added in early 1963, and the flights with Il-18s continued to Aden in the Aden Protectorate, while in March the airline began flights to Switzerland and Moscow, although those flights were short-lived. In September 1963, the airline joined the International Air Transport Association, becoming its ninety-third member, and they returned four of their eight Il-18s to the Soviet Union after determining that they were surplus to the airline's requirements. In 1961, it was reported that in three months of operation on the Accra-Khartoum route, the airline had carried only 12 revenue passengers. It was also reported in 1962 that the airline was only utilising the aircraft collectively for no more than 36 hours of flight time per week. The airline signed a lease agreement with Swissair in October 1963 for the wet-lease operation of Convair 990 jetliners on the Accra-London route.

The Viscounts were put up for sale in November 1964, and the airline began a pool agreement with Nigeria Airways, which saw Ghana Airways being given cabotage rights from Lagos to Cairo and Beirut via Kano and Addis Ababa. Midway through February 1965, the contract with Swissair came to an end, and the Vickers VC10 took its place. In the same month, the Britannias were withdrawn. The first VC10 was delivered to Accra on 18 December 1964 and initially conducted proving and training flights, before entering service on 15 February 1965 on the route to London. The second VC10 was delivered to the airline in June 1965, enabling services to Beirut to commence. Ghana Airways operated the aircraft in a configuration of 20 first class and 87 economy class seats.

Following the February 1966 coup in which Nkrumah's regime was overthrown, the new National Liberation Council (NLC) took steps to eliminate loss-making routes from the Ghana Airways network, which Nkrumah had kept open in order to show the Ghanaian flag. However, the NLC continued Nkrumah's policy of directing Ghana Airways to operate routes based upon politics but forced the airline to stop operations to Cairo because of the support for Nkrumah given by Egyptian President Gamal Abdel Nasser.

The remaining Soviet aircraft, one Antonov An-12 and four Il-18s, were retired in 1967. The route to Bamako, suspended since the February 1966 coup, restarted in conjunction with Air Mali operating one of their Il-18s on the route. The airline also started a pool agreement with Nigeria Airways, under which Ghana Airways utilized Nigerian Fokker F27s on domestic routes and Nigeria Airways employed Ghana Airways Viscounts on their Lagos-Accra route.

The first McDonnell Douglas DC-9s were delivered in 1975, and in 1976 the airline added Lagos as a stopover on their route from Accra to Cotonou. The same year the airline placed an order for a McDonnell Douglas DC-10, and whilst awaiting delivery took a DC-10 on lease from KLM Royal Dutch Airlines. The airline's DC-10 was delivered on 24 February 1983, and the aircraft leased from the Dutch airline was returned. At this time the airline had added new international destinations to their route network, which included Amsterdam, Douala, Frankfurt, Jeddah, Libreville, and Niamey. The airline's DC-10 also visited the West Indies on behalf of Caribbean Airways, thanks to a wet-lease contract, renewed in January 1986, which saw the aircraft operating twice-weekly services to Barbados from London's Gatwick Airport in between its regular Accra-London rotations.

Flights to the United States began in September 1994, when the airline began operations to JFK International Airport in New York City with DC-10s leased from Skyjet on a twice-weekly basis. At this time, Düsseldorf and Harare were also featured on the airline's route network. For its flights to New York City, the airline would later lease a McDonnell Douglas MD-11 from World Airways. In 1995, Speedwing, the consultancy arm of British Airways, was awarded a two-year contract to manage the airline. Following Ghana's receipt of Category One status from the US Federal Aviation Administration, Ghana Airways was able to operate flights to New York City from mid-October 1996 utilising Ghanaian-registered DC-10s.

=== Towards its demise ===
The airline inked a co-operation agreement with South African Airways on 25 March 1999, which would see the two airlines increasing flights to near daily between Johannesburg and Accra, in addition to offering more services between West and East Africa to the United States. As part of the alliance, South African Airways ceased flights to Dakar in order to route their flights to the United States via Accra. Flights to Baltimore commenced in July 2000, with the Maryland city becoming the second United States destination for the airline. Flights to Dubai in the United Arab Emirates were inaugurated in November 2000, along with the re-introduction of flights to Beirut, after a thirty-year hiatus. Banjul in The Gambia was added to the route network in February 2001 in conjunction with Gambia International Airlines, with flights continuing to Baltimore, marking the first direct service between The Gambia and the United States. Operations to Banjul did not always operate smoothly. In January 2002 a group of disgruntled passengers due to travel to Baltimore threatened to burn the airlines' DC-10 and offices at Banjul International Airport after being stranded by the airline. The passengers were informed by employees of the airline that their 13 January flight was scheduled to arrive in Banjul at 10:00 am, however, upon arrival at the airport they were informed that their aircraft had arrived at 3:00 am and had already left for the United States. According to the passengers, Ghana Airways had flown a full aircraft into Banjul and had left for Baltimore. An official at the airport confirmed that a similar incident occurred on 6 January, after 40 passengers were stranded by the airline after the flight arrived in Banjul ahead of schedule.

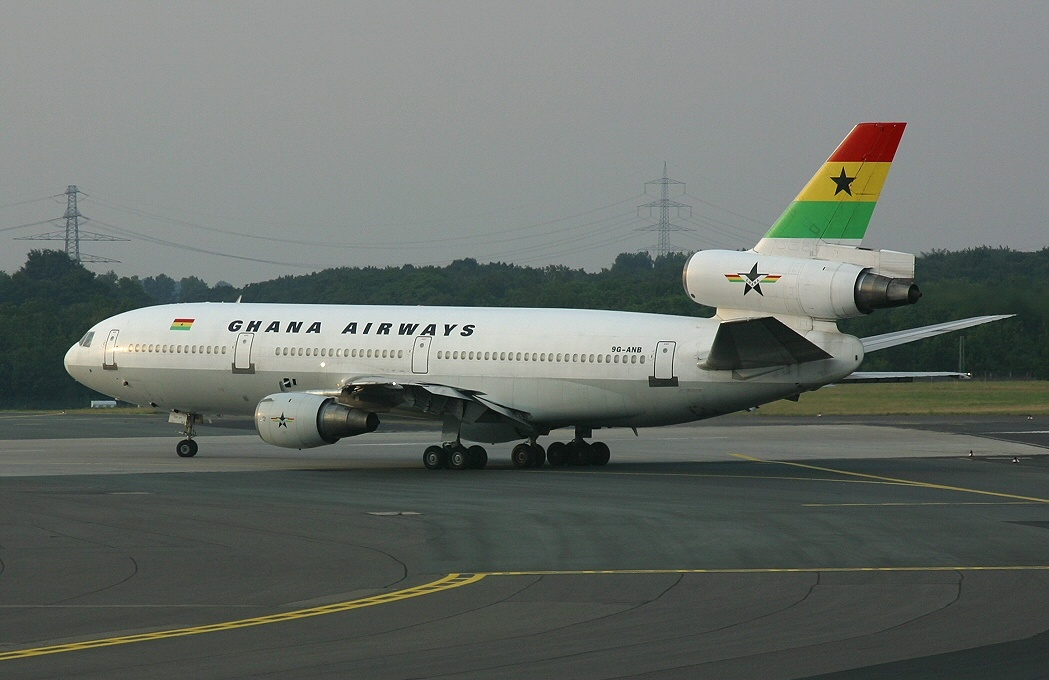
A Ghana Airways McDonnell Douglas DC-10-30 at Düsseldorf Airport in 2003

One of the airlines' DC-10s was seized at Heathrow Airport in June 2002, after a British creditor of the airline got a legal judgement in order to recoup some £4 million in unpaid debts. After the seizure, Sam Jonah, then-airline chairman, stated that Ghana Airways was some US$160 million in debt, and the airline would require a foreign partner if it were to survive. He also noted that the British creditor released the aircraft after the airline paid US$1 million. The Ghanaian government announced in September 2002 that it had signed a deal with Nationwide Airlines which would see the South African airline taking over the management of the airline, which would have been renamed Ghana Nationwide International Airlines. Nationwide, which beat out rival British Midland, as part of the deal would not take on liabilities for the debts of the national airline. In February 2003, Richard Anane, the Minister of Roads and Transport, announced that the government had withdrawn from the deal with Nationwide Airlines.

It was announced in June 2003 that British Midland had entered into an agreement with the Ghanaian government for the creation of Fly Ghana Limited. The company, of which the government would hold a golden share, would operate for an indeterminate period as a separate entity to Ghana Airways, at which time both companies would be merged into a single company to potentially be named New Ghana Airways. Under the plan, British Midland would supply to the airline an Airbus A330 for use on flights to London, with an additional A330 being utilised on flights to New York City. Additionally, British Midland would operate a Fokker 100 on the airline's regional route network, with the DC-10 being deployed on the airline's secondary international routes.

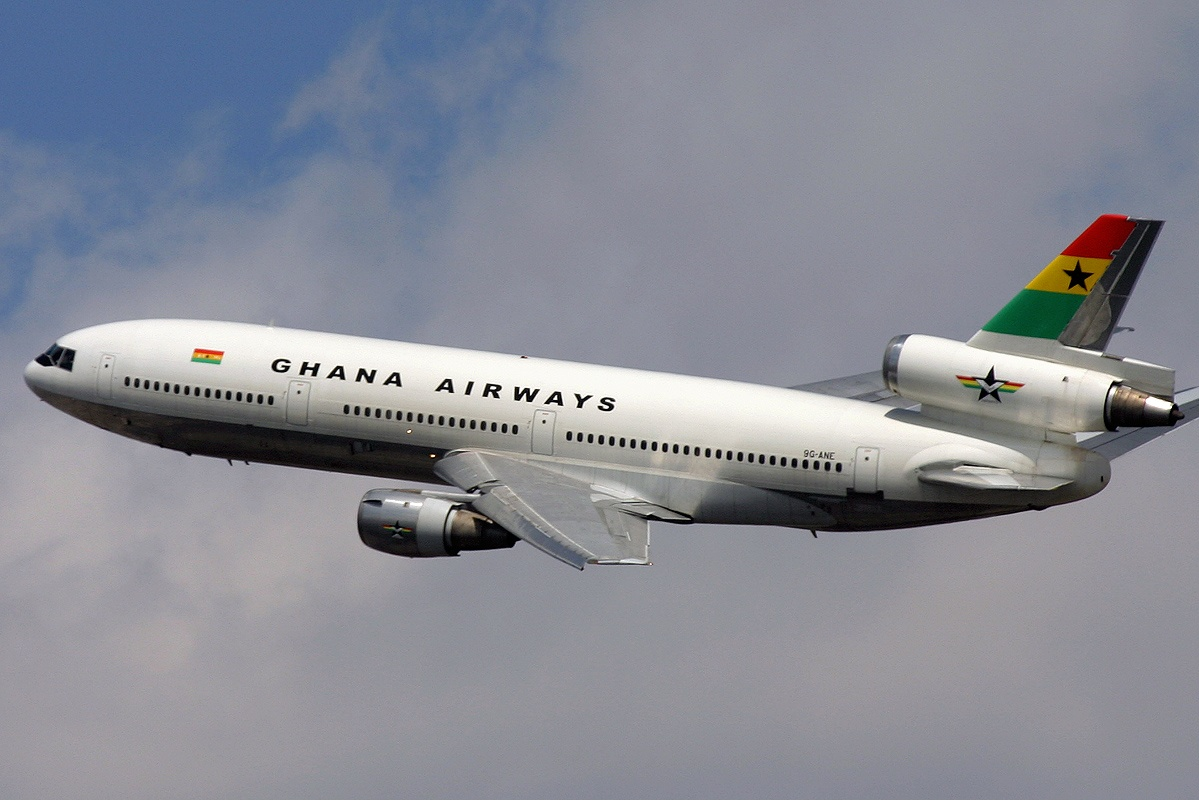
A Ghana Airways McDonnell Douglas DC-10-30 just departed from John F. Kennedy International Airport in 2004

In July 2004, the United States Department of Transportation banned the airline from operating flights into or out of the United States, whilst investigations were underway that the airline had ignored orders relating to the grounding of unsafe aircraft, and that the airline had been operating on an out-of-date licence. As a result, the airline was forced to cancel two weekly flights to JFK International Airport and two weekly flights to Baltimore–Washington International Airport. According to the spokesman of the USDOT, the airline had utilised an aircraft which the Federal Aviation Administration had ordered to be grounded on flights to New York City and Baltimore on 24 and 26 July, respectively. The banning led to the Ghana Airways board being sacked by the government, and the government taking over full control of the airline. Kwadwo Mpiani, the Presidential Chief of Staff, stated that the measures were necessary in order to prevent further damage coming to the national airline. He also stated that the government would insure that the airline would be turned around. The comments followed on from an incident the week previous when angry passengers took a Ghana Airways pilot hostage at Kokota International Airport, after they had waited for some days for their flights on the airline. In the aftermath of the incident, President John Kufuor held emergency meetings with officials from the airline and police.

It was reported in April 2005 that Ethiopian Airlines was negotiating with the government in Accra to help keep Ghana Airways afloat, in a deal which would have seen the government keeping a 25% share in the airline, with 40% being sold off to the Ethiopian national airline and Ghana International Airlines. Unable to keep up with its debt repayments, and due to the government refusal to pump more money into the airline, Ghana Airways was liquidated in June 2005.

In December 2008, the government released some $2.25 million to the liquidator to pay the final instalment in severance claims to ex-employees of Ghana Airways. This tranche brought the total amount paid out to Ghanaian employees of the airline to some $7.8 million. The Nigerian National Union of Air Transport Employees decried the payouts, claiming that Nigerian employees of the airline had only received 14% of their entitlements, whilst Ghanaian employees received their full entitlements. The Union also claimed that funds from the Lagos office of the airline were used to fund the office of the Ghanaian High Commission in Abuja.

=== Restart ===
In 2020, the Government of Ghana announced an MoU with EgyptAir to restart Ghana Airways. The airline will rehire former Ghana Airways staff and take delivery of 3 Boeing 787 Dreamliners. Dr. Charles Wereko-Brobbey was appointed as the chairman of the new airline, while technical support will be provided by Egyptair and Boeing. In 2025, TAP Air Portugal was announced as the new strategic partner for the relaunch of Ghana Airways.

== Destinations ==
As of 1994, Ghana Airways operated to these destinations:

=== Africa ===
- Benin
  - Cotonou – Cadjehoun Airport
- Gambia
  - Banjul – Banjul International Airport
- Ghana
  - Accra – Accra International Airport – Hub
- Guinea
  - Conakry – Ahmed Sékou Touré International Airport
- Ivory Coast
  - Abidjan – Port Bouet Airport
- Nigeria
  - Lagos – Murtala Muhammed International Airport
- Senegal
  - Dakar - Léopold Sédar Senghor International Airport
- Sierra Leone
  - Freetown – Lungi International Airport
- South Africa
  - Johannesburg – O.R. Tambo International Airport
- Zimbabwe
  - Harare – Robert Gabriel Mugabe International Airport

=== Europe ===
- Italy
  - Rome – Leonardo da Vinci-Fiumicino Airport
- Germany
  - Düsseldorf – Düsseldorf Airport
- United Kingdom
  - London – Heathrow Airport

=== North America ===
- United States
  - New York City – John F. Kennedy International Airport

Baltimore - Thurgood Marshall BWI airport.

== Fleet ==
Ghana Airways formerly operated the following aircraft:

Former Ghana Airways fleet
Aircraft	Total	Introduced	Retired	Notes
Airbus A310-300	1	1995	1995	Leased from Air Afrique
Airbus A320-200	1	2002	2003	Leased from Lotus Air
Airbus A330-300	1	2003	2003	Leased from Skyservice Airlines
Antonov An-12BP	1	1961	1962	
Boeing 377 Stratocruiser	6	Unknown	Unknown	Leased from BOAC
Boeing 707-320	1	Unknown	Unknown	Leased from Luxair
Bristol 175 Britannia	5	1960	1972	
Convair 990	4	1963	1965	Leased from Swissair
de Havilland DH.114 Heron	2	1958		
de Havilland Comet 4	1	1961	1962	Leased from BOAC
Douglas C-47 Skytrain	4	1959	1974	
Douglas DC-8-32	2	1976	1977	Leased from Ranger Air Cargo
Douglas DC-8-33F	1	1976	1976	Leased from Ranger Air Cargo
Fokker F-28 Fellowship	5	1971	1996	
Hawker Siddeley HS 748	2	1970	1981	
Ilyushin Il-18	8	1960	1964	
McDonnell Douglas DC-9-31	1	1976	1976	Leased from Hughes Airwest
McDonnell Douglas DC-9-32	1	1995	1995	Leased from Interstate Airlines
McDonnell Douglas DC-9-51	6	1978	2005	
McDonnell Douglas DC-10-30	11	1981	2004	One was converted into La Tante DC10 Restaurant
McDonnell Douglas MD-11	1	1994	1995	Leased from World Airways
Vickers VC-10	2	1965	1980	
Vickers Viscount 800	4	1961	1975	

== Accidents and incidents ==
- On 24 April 1969, a Douglas C-47A Skytrain (registered 9G-AAF) was on final approach to Takoradi Airport and lost both engines and power, Captain David Tait, managed to turn the plane away from a ravine and bring it down it into a maize field. One passenger, Mr Moss of Messrs. A. Lang Ltd died, who was of British origin, out of the 33 passengers and crew. The aircraft was operating a domestic scheduled passenger flight from Kotoka Airport, Accra.
- On 12 April 1997, a McDonnell Douglas DC-9-51 (registered 9G-ACM) veered off the runway of Félix-Houphouët-Boigny International Airport after attempting to land. The aircraft's landing gear collapsed and ran off. All 97 passengers and 7 crew members survived. The aircraft was damaged beyond repairs and was scrapped.
- In 2000 a Fokker F27 was written off killing 7 people

== See also ==
- List of airlines of Ghana
- Ghana International Airlines
