= DGSI =

DGSI may refer to:

- General Directorate for Internal Security, a French intelligence agency
- ICAO code for Kumasi Airport in Ghana
