= Air Ghana =

Ghanaian cargo airline

IATA	ICAO	Call sign
GO	GHN	AIR GHANA
- Founded: 1993
- Commenced operations: 2014
- AOC #: 034
- Operating bases: Accra International Airport
- Fleet size: 3
- Destinations: 4
- Headquarters: Accra, Greater Accra, Ghana
- Key people: Karim Traboulsi (CEO)
- Website: airghana.com

Air Ghana is a cargo airline of Ghana with its head office at Ghana Airport Cargo Center (GACC) in Accra, Ghana, and its main hub at Accra International Airport in Accra.

== History ==
Air Ghana was founded in 1993 as an air logistics company. It grew to provide ground handling, cargo handling, GSSA and aviation support services over the next two decades.

In 2014, Air Ghana received its Air Operator Certificate from Ghana Civil Aviation Authority and commenced operations with a Boeing 737-400 freighter on behalf of DHL.

In 2016, Air Ghana opened the Ghana Airport Cargo Center, a 10,000 sq.m dedicated cargo warehouse facility supplemented by 9,000 sq.m of office space, in partnership with Ghana Airports Company Limited and Swissport.

As of 2025, Air Ghana has indicated plans of expanding into passenger operations.

== Fleet ==
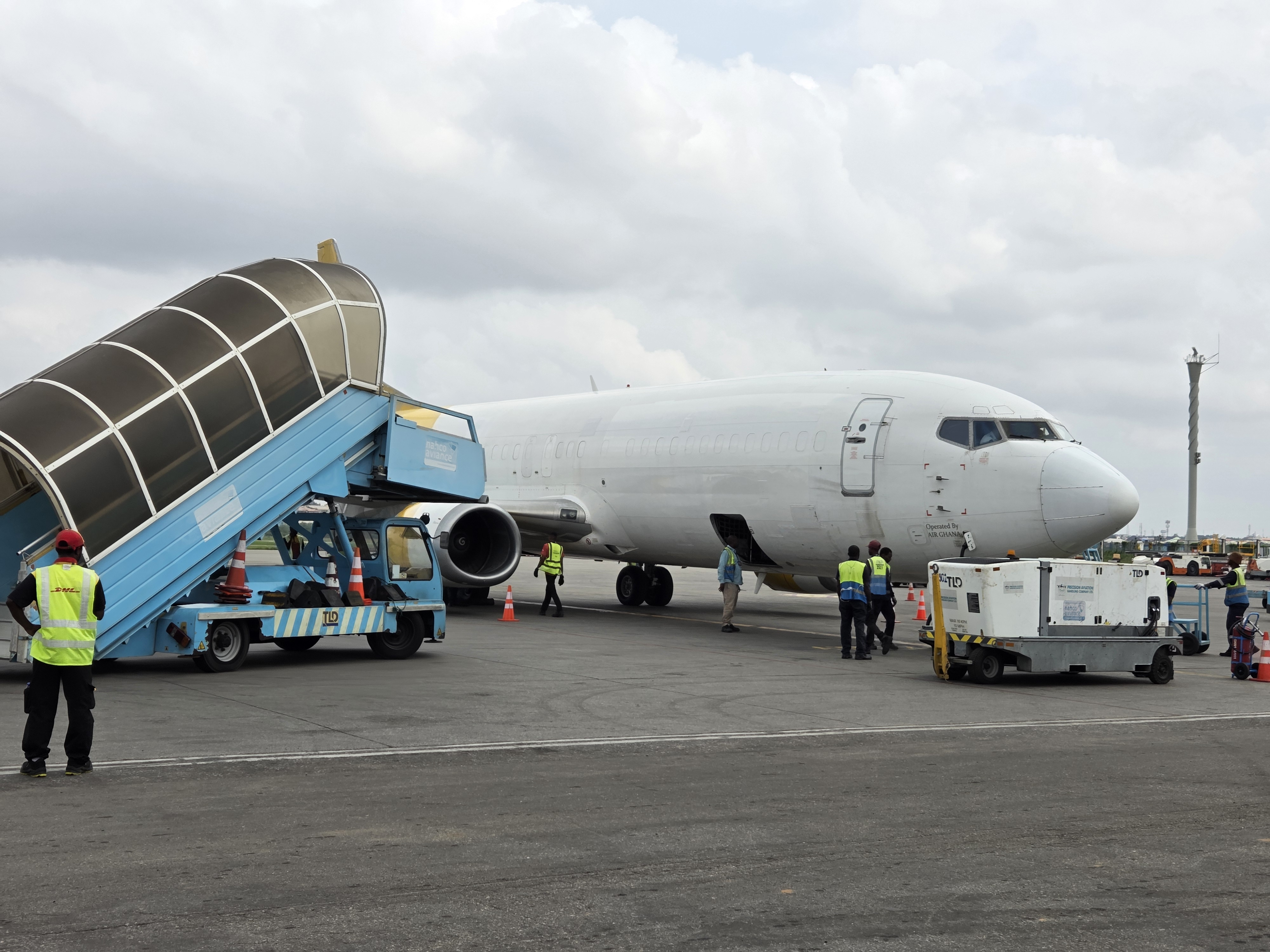
Boeing 737-400 at Lagos Murtala Muhammed International Airport

=== Current fleet ===
As of July 2026, Air Ghana operates the following aircraft:

Aircraft	In service	Orders	Remarks
Boeing 737-400SF	3	—	(2 operated for DHL Aviation)
Total	3	—	
