= Duko =

Village in Ghana

Coordinates: 9.5623°N 0.8330°W

Duko is a village in the Savelugu municipal district of Ghana. In 2015 it had population of about 900 inhabitants.

== Location ==
Duko is located 7 km (4.3 mi) south of Savelugu and 18 km (11 mi) north of Tamale, Ghana, the northern regional capital, on the Tamale-Bolga highway. As part of the expansion and upgrading of the Tamale International Airport to an international standard, a 5km road has been constructed to link the airport to the Tamale-Bolgatanga highway (N10) at Duko which is located about 3 km north-east of the airport.

== Culture ==
Duko is inhabited primarily by the Dagomba people who speak the Dagbani language. Duko is headed by a chief who is subservient to the Paramount Chief of Savelugu. The incumbent chief of Duko since 2016 is Naa Mahama Abukari 'Natural'. Duko is noted for 'Duko-Tua', literally Baobab of Duko. It was a large boabab tree believed to accommodate some spiritual creatures who were somewhat friendly to inhabitants of the village and serve as guards to the village. It was also host to a swam of bees which was believe to protect the village against possible attack from its neighbours. The tree was brought down in the year 1993 to pave way for the reconstruction of the Tamale-Bolga Highway.

== Education ==
The village has a Junior High School, a primary school and a kindergarten.

== Economy ==
Many inhabitants of Duko are farmers who grow maize and rice. Until recently, farmers in the community were engaged in subsistence farming.
