= Aerogem Aviation =

Ghanaian cargo airline

IATA	ICAO	Call sign
—	GCK (Note: Not a current allocation (July 2018))	AEROGEM (Note: Not a current allocation (July 2018))
- Founded: January 2000
- Hubs: Accra International Airport; Sharjah International Airport
- Fleet size: 1
- Destinations: 20
- Headquarters: Accra, Greater Accra, Ghana; Dubai, United Arab Emirates
- Key people: Gabriel Nsiah Nketiah (Chairman)
- Website: aerogemaviation.com

Aerogem Aviation Ltd (sometimes written AeroGEM Aviation) was a Ghanaian cargo airline based in Ghana. Its head office is in the 1 Gemini Airlines Building in Old Cargo Village, Accra International Airport, Accra. It operates worldwide non-scheduled cargo flights. Its main bases are Accra International Airport, Accra and Sharjah International Airport, United Arab Emirates.

== History ==
The airline was established and started operations in 2000 as Aerogem Cargo using a wet leased Boeing 707-320C aircraft. It was renamed Aerogem Aviation in October 2004. It has 16 employees (at March 2007).

== Fleet ==
The Aerogem Cargo fleet consists of the following aircraft (at September 2020):

- 1 Boeing 707-320C

=== Former fleet ===
- 2 Douglas DC-8-63F
