= Meridian Airways =

Belgian airline

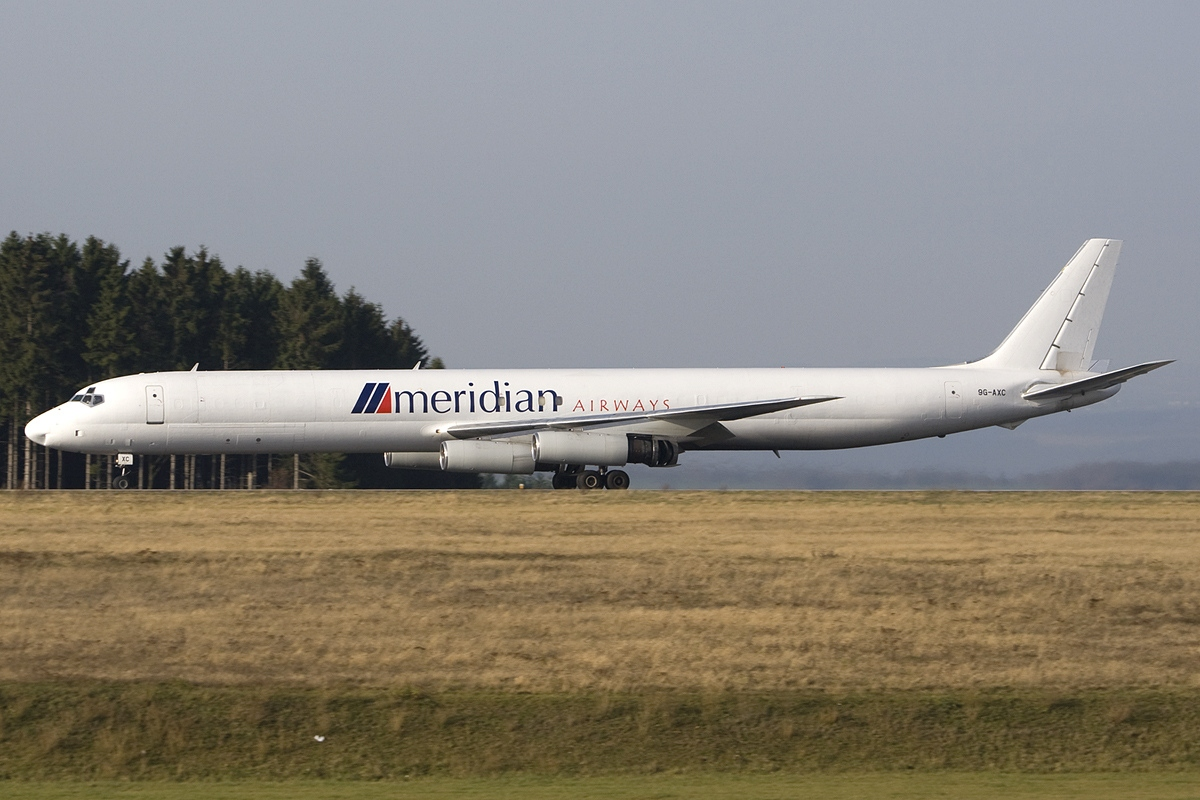
- Douglas DC 8-63F
IATA	ICAO	Call sign
—	MAG	MERID AIR
- Founded: 2003 (as Cargoplus Aviation)
- Ceased operations: 2015
- Hubs: Ostend-Brugge International Airport
- Fleet size: 5
- Headquarters: Accra International Airport; Accra, Ghana
- Website: https://web.archive.org/web/20130901210043/http://www.meridianairways.com///

Meridian Airways was a Ghanaian registered cargo airline (with an Air Operator Certificate Number of AOC 023) with its head office in Accra International Airport, Accra, and served as its main hub at Ostend-Brugge International Airport in Belgium.

== History ==
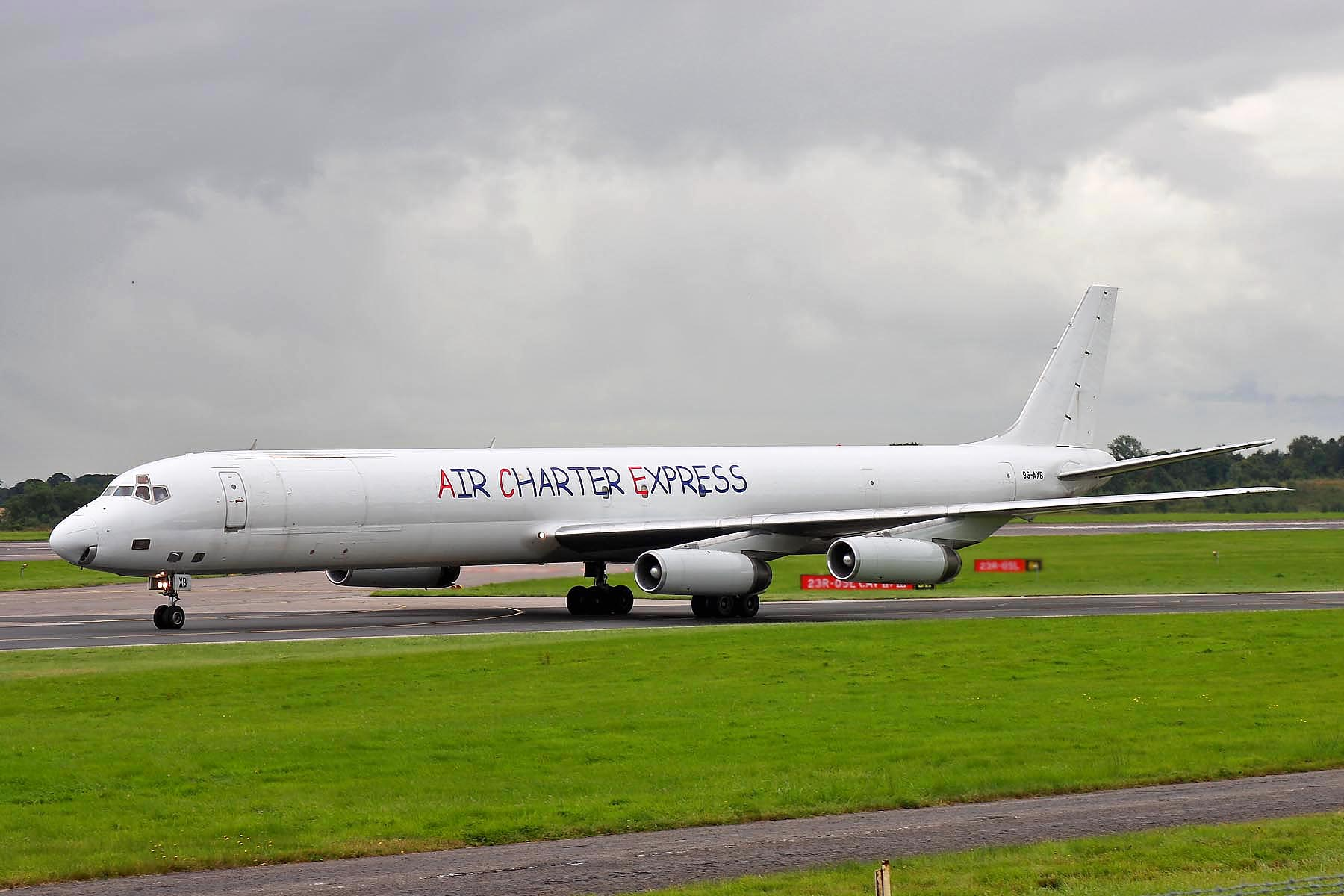
Air Charter Express Douglas DC 8-63PF

The company started operations as Cargoplus Aviation in 2003, changing its name to Air Charter Express in 2007 while operating a Douglas DC-8-63AF. Operated two DC-8s on cargo charter flights from Ostend Airport to the Middle East. The airline also operated charter flights for the British Ministry of Defence from RAF Lyneham.

Two additional DC-8-63F's arrived at Ostend Airport (EBOS) with Meridian Air colours. During 2009, Air Charter Express was renamed to Meridian Airways.

Meridian Airways Ltd. was banned from operating in the European Union.

In January 2010, Meridian Airways operated a series of flights from East Midlands Airport to Port-au-Prince in response to the 2010 Haiti earthquake.

In 2014, Meridian's fleet of DC-8's were among all planes of that type grounded by the Ghana government and ceased all the operations in 2015.
