= Johnsons Air =

Airline in Ghana

IATA	ICAO	Call sign
-	JON	Johnsons Air
- Commenced operations: 1996
- Ceased operations: 2008
- Operating bases: Accra International Airport
- Fleet size: 3
- Headquarters: Accra, Ghana
- Key people: Farzin Azima

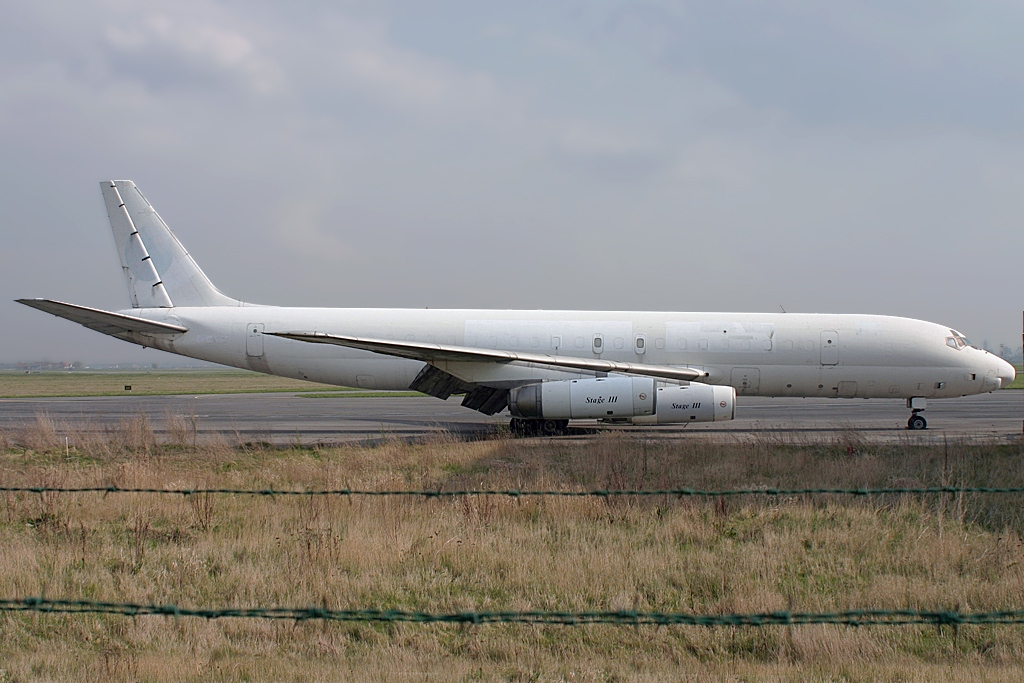
A Johnsons Air Douglas DC-8 at Ostend-Bruges International Airport, Belgium. (2009)

Johnsons Air was an airline registered in Ghana and based at Accra International Airport in Accra, Ghana. Founded in 1996 by Farzin Azima, it operated ad hoc cargo services. The airline was one of eight airlines blacklisted in Belgium in 2005 due to operational safety concerns. In October 2006, the ban was extended to include all European Union communities. Johnsons Air meanwhile ceased operations.

== Fleet ==
As of March 2007 the Johnsons Air fleet consisted of the following aircraft:

- 3 Douglas DC-8-63CF
