= Baby Jet Airlines =

Proposed airline

IATA	ICAO	Call sign
—	FBJ	BABY JET
- Founded: 2017
- Ceased operations: 2019
- Key people: Asamoah Gyan (co-Founder)

Baby Jet Airlines Limited was a proposed airline, co-founded by professional footballer Asamoah Gyan. The company was founded in 2017 and its launch was officially announced by the President of Ghana, Nana Addo Dankwah Akufo-Addo in October 2017. It was awarded an Air Carriers Licence by the Ghana Civil Aviation Authority, but did not commence operations despite multiple announced start dates.
