= General sales agent =

Sales representative for an airline in a specific country or region

In the aviation industry, a general sales agent (GSA) is a sales agent for an airline company who is authorized to sell travel tickets and assist the public with travel-related needs. An agent's duties include performing tasks that help the company's achieve its sales objectives.
