= Tamale International Airport =

Airport in Ghana

Yakubu Tali International Airport
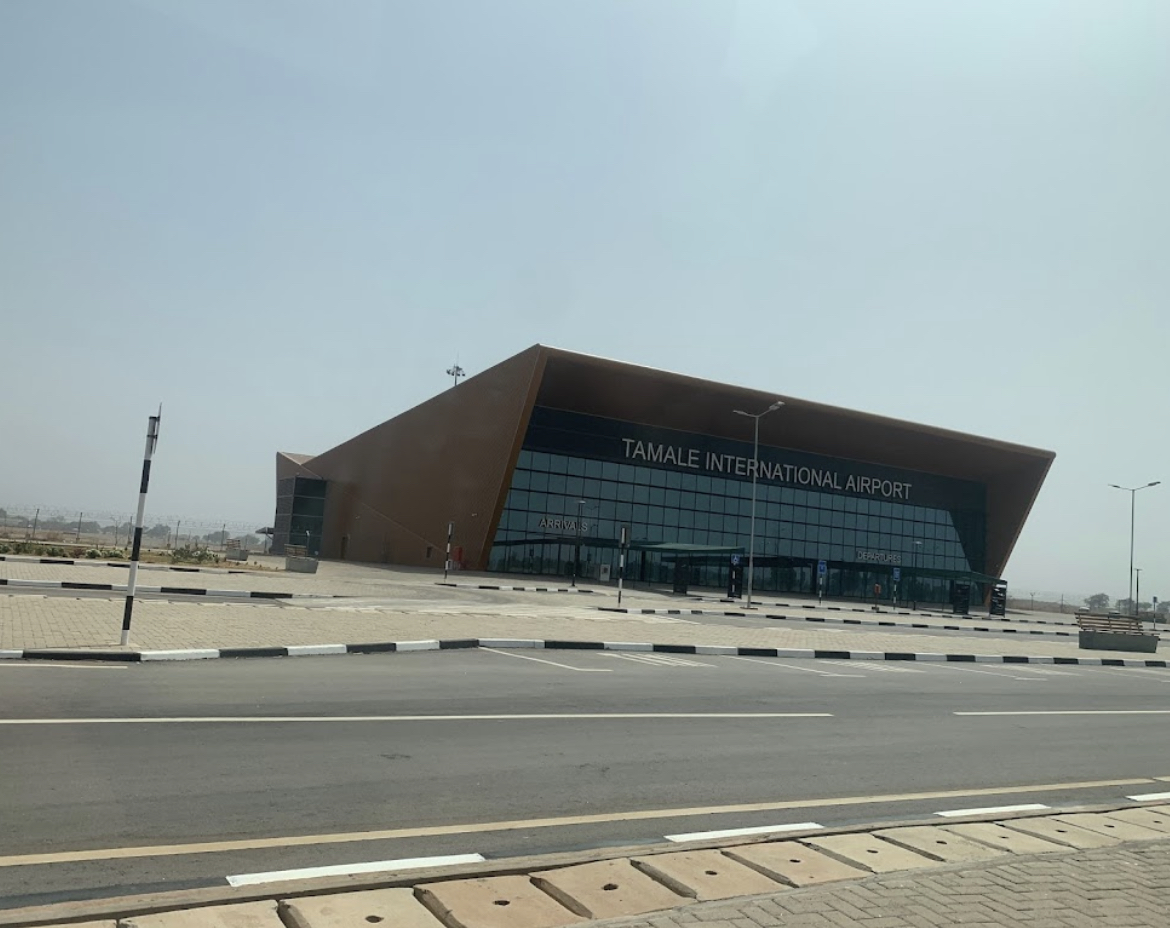
- IATA: TML; ICAO: DGLE

Summary
- Airport type: Civilian & military
- Operator: Ghana Airports Company Limited
- Location: Tamale, Ghana
- Elevation AMSL: 553 ft (169 m)
- Coordinates: 09°33′25″N 00°51′47″W

Map
- Location in Ghana

Runways
Direction	Length		Surface
Direction	m	ft	Surface
05/23	3,400	11,199	Asphalt

Statistics (2021)
- Passengers: 217,958

Yakubu Tali International Airport (IATA: TML, ICAO: DGLE) is an airport serving Tamale, a city in the Northern Region of Ghana. It was established in December 1940, serving as the landing place for military troops during World War II.

It is the third international airport in the country in addition to Accra International Airport and Kumasi International Airport, but, as of 2024, it lacked international flights. TML is the third-busiest airport in Ghana, with 217,899 passengers in 2025. The airport was initially staffed by the Air Force, but over time, aid was sought from GCAA to provide personnel for telecommunications, as well as to assume care of the RFFS and air traffic services.

== Historical development ==
Initially founded as an advanced operational base for troops, the airport's strategic importance was recognized early on.

In the 1960s, plans were made to develop a new international airport to serve both military and civilian purposes. Although the project faced delays, it eventually resumed, leading to the establishment of facilities accommodating civil operations.

== Location ==
The airport is located in the northern part of the city of Tamale, approximately 23 kilometres (14 mi) north of the city centre off of Highway N10. The geographical coordinates of the airport are:9°33'25.0"N, 0°51'47.0"W (Latitude: 9.556944; Longitude: -0.863056). The airport is located approximately 553 feet (169 m) above mean sea level.

== Upgrade to international status ==
The Tamale Airport was upgraded to the status of an international airport in two phases.

In preparation for the 2008 Africa Cup of Nations (20 January 2008 to 10 February 2008) and with a budget of US$4.2 million, this airport was upgraded in Phase 1 by resurfacing the single runway, the taxiways and aprons; upgrading the terminal building; constructing a modified fire service building; rehabilitating the tower building; paving an outside car park; and creating of a VVIP lounge. Provisions for Immigration and Customs Services were made. The engineering, procurement and construction (EPC) contractor was a joint venture between Focal Roads Limited and CONSUL Limited. The owner's consulting engineer was BANS Consult. During the CAN 2008 Africa Cup of Nations, the airport serviced direct flights between Ghana and Angola, South Africa and Tunisia.

The second phase, which started in July 2019, included the following components:

- Construction of a terminal building, measuring 5,000 square metres (54,000 ft^{2}), capable of handling 400,000 passengers annually
- Construction of a VIP lounge
- Construction of two boarding gates
- Construction of two self-service check-in kiosks
- Construction of eight check-in desks
- Construction of airline offices and commercial retail spaces
- Construction of a car park that can accommodate 330 cars
- A new 5-kilometer road network off the Tamale-Bolgatanga road was constructed to ease airport accessibility.

The second phase of expansion concluded in August 2023 at a budgeted cost of US$70 million. Part of that cost, amounting to US$55.7 million, was borrowed by the Ghanaian government from UK Export Finance. The EPC contractor was the United Kingdom subsidiary of the Brazilian multinational company Queiroz Galvão.

== 2016 Hajj pilgrims uplift ==
In August 2016, Tamale International airport was cleared to uplift pilgrims to Prince Mohammad bin Abdulaziz Airport in Medina in three batches of 500 passengers. Flynas air services providers were contracted to uplift the pilgrims using leased Lion Air Boeing 747-400 jets. The upgraded airport also serviced Hajj pilgrimage flights in 2022 and 2023. Tamale Airport now acts as an alternative to Accra International Airport, with the ability to handle wide-body aircraft in the event of an emergency at KIA.

== Airlines and destinations ==
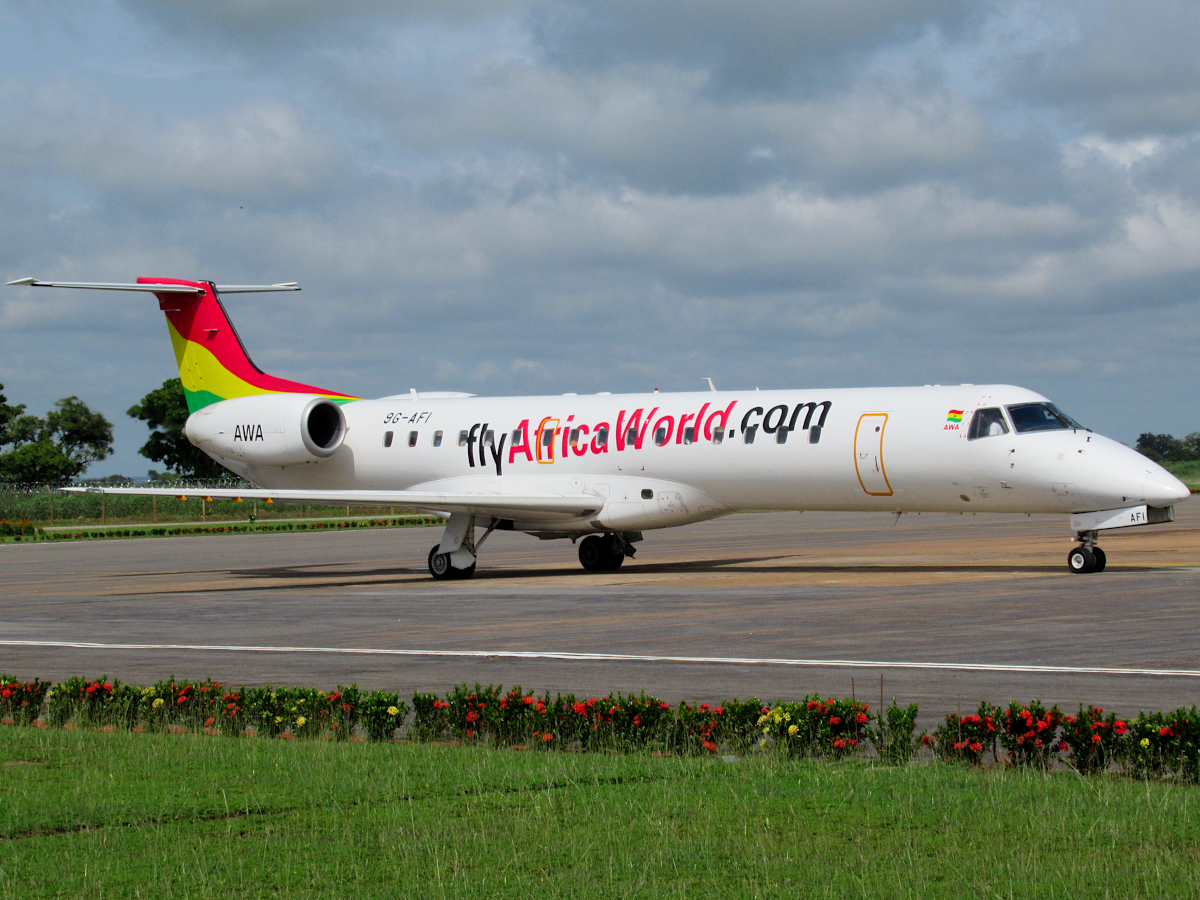
Africa World Airlines ERJ-145 at Tamale Airport

=== Passenger ===
Airlines	Destinations
Africa World Airlines	Accra
Passion Air	Accra

== Statistics ==
These data show the number of passengers movements into the airport, according to the Ghana Civil Aviation Authority.

Year	2014	2015	2016	2017	2018	2019	2020	2021	2022	2023	2024	2025
Passengers	172,294	135,941	120,907	152,425	137,496	196,600	148,545	207,216	217,958	195,144	218,770	217,899
Reference												

== Accidents and incidents ==
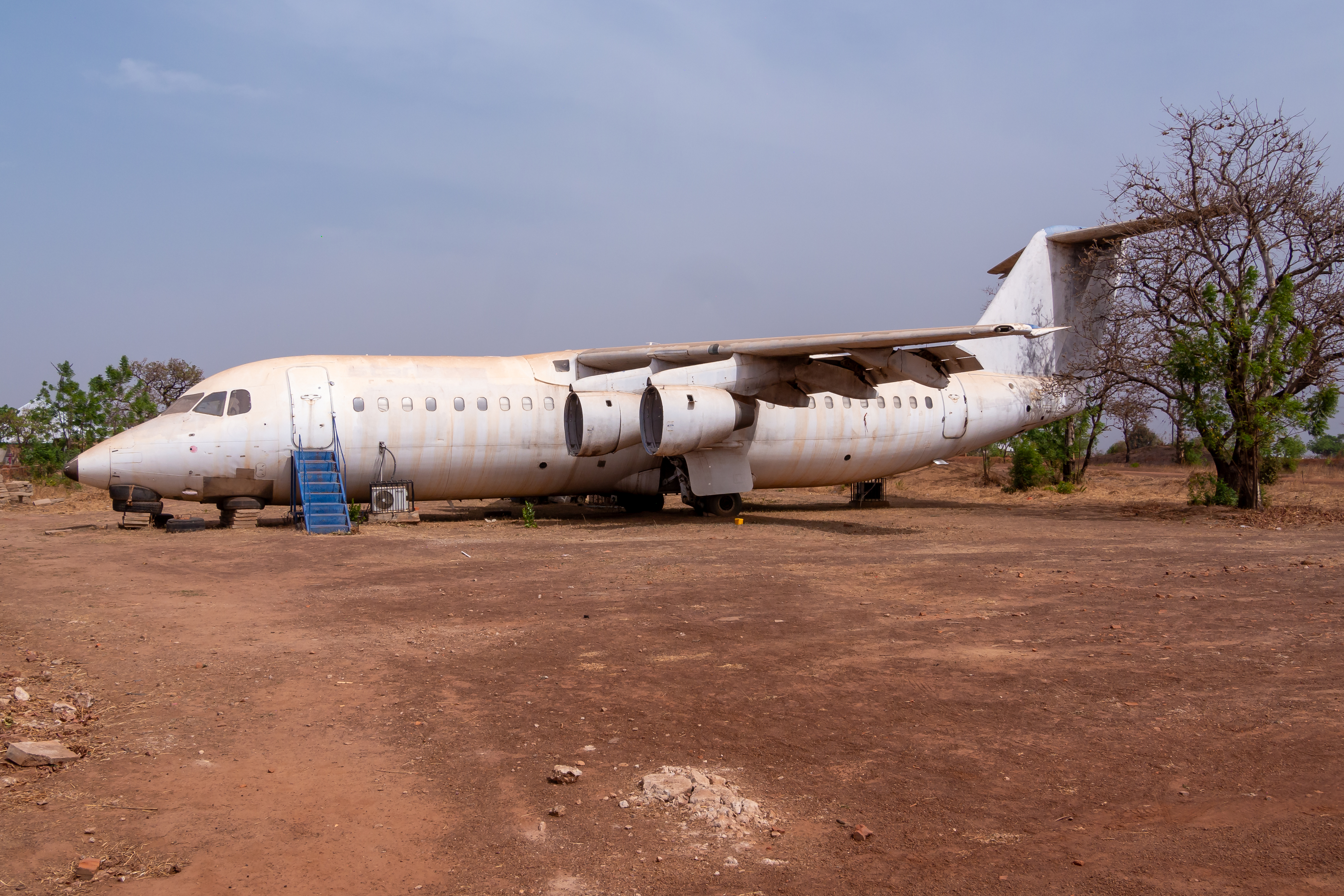
The damaged 9G-SBB on display near Tamale

- On 16 August 2013, an Antrak Air ATR 72 from Tamale to Accra made an emergency landing back at Tamale after the crew received a fire indication warning for the left engine. No injuries were reported.
- On 6 October 2015, a Starbow BAe 146-300 (9G-SBB) from Accra to Tamale over ran the end of runway 23 on landing resulting in the collapse of the nose gear. There were no major injuries, but the aircraft sustained significant damage and was written off.

== Gallery ==
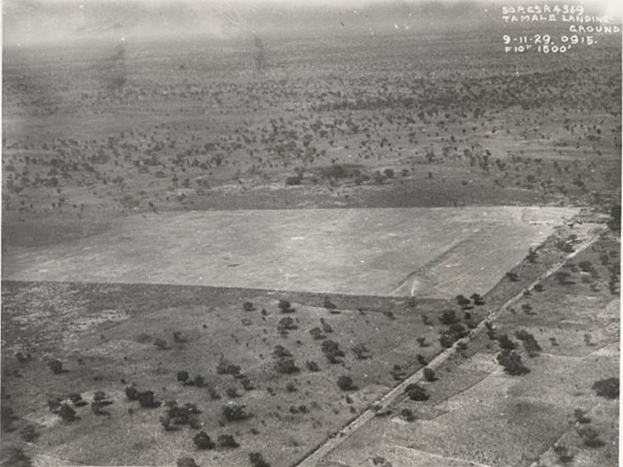
Tamale old airport (Nyohini) in 1929 when it was still a landing ground for Gold Coast governors overseeing the Northern Territories

Aerial view of Tamale Airport in 2020
