= Prempeh I International Airport =

Airport serving Kumasi, Ghana

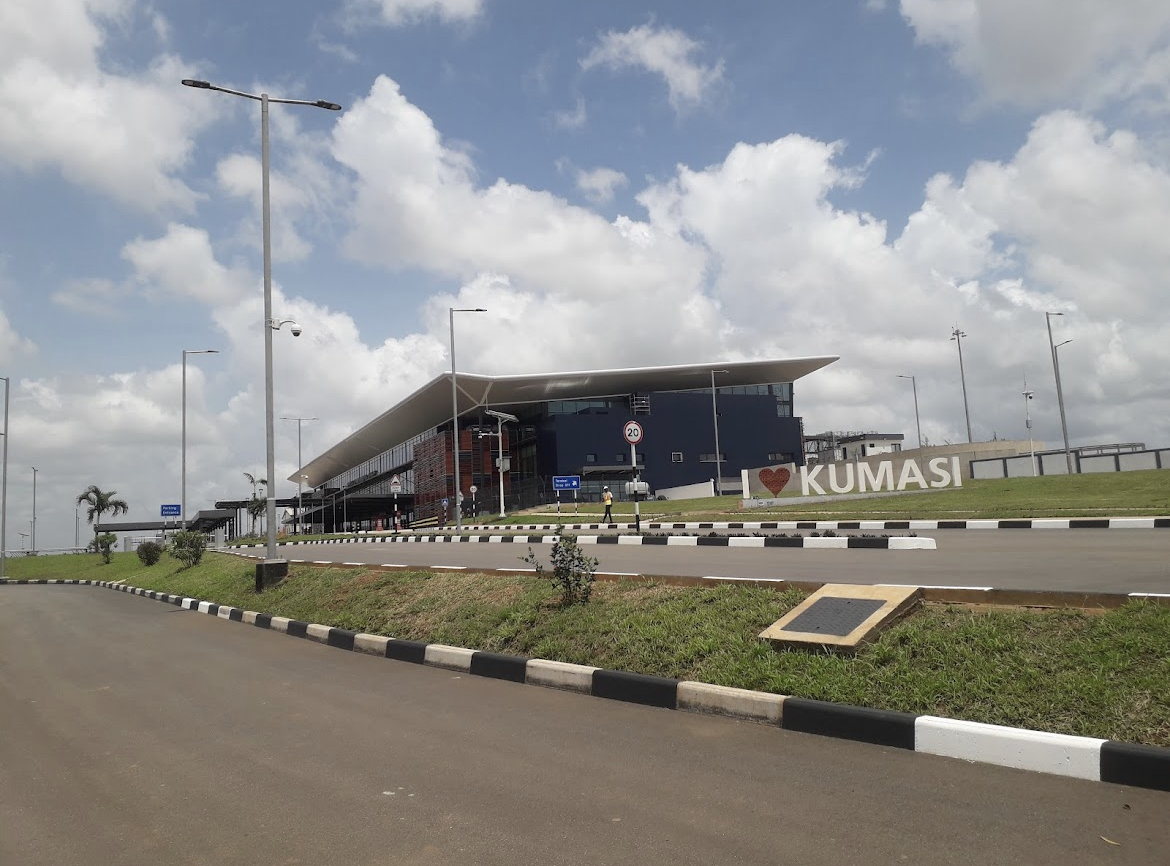
- IATA: KMS; ICAO: DGSI

Summary
- Airport type: Domestic airport
- Owner: Ghana Airports Company Limited
- Serves: Kumasi
- Location: Kumasi, Ghana
- Opened: 1943
- Time zone: Greenwich Mean Time (0+)
  - Summer (DST): GMT (1+)
- Elevation AMSL: 942 ft / 287 m
- Coordinates: 06°42′52″N 001°35′26″W

Map
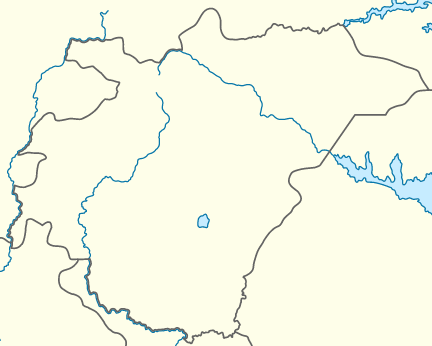

Runways
| Direction | Length | | Surface |
| Direction | m | ft | Surface |
|---|---|---|---|
| 02/20 | 2,320 | 7,612 | Asphalt |

Statistics (2024)
- Passengers: 453,201
- Source: DAFIF

Prempeh I International Airport (IATA: KMS, ICAO: DGSI) is an international airport in Ghana serving Kumasi, the capital of the Ashanti Region, other regions in the middle belt of Ghana as well as the northern part of Ghana. In 2024, the airport handled over 453,201 passengers, making it the second busiest airport in Ghana after Accra International Airport in Accra. in September 2024, its name changed from Kumasi Airport to Prempeh I International Airport, named after the Asante King Prempeh I.

Prempeh I International Airport is located 6 kilometres (4 mi) from Kumasi. It was changed from a Military Base to an airport in 1999. The airport has undergone several renovation and expansion projects to help push its status as an international airport.

== History ==
Approval to start an airport in Kumasi by the then British Government was obtained in 1940, even though the land acquisition documentation was completed and paid for in 1947. Prior to that, in 1943, the Kumasi Airport had been completed and was in use. The airport was started as a military air force base for the British Royal Air Force during World War II.

In 1958 and 1959, the Government of Ghana made extensive developments on the runway, navigational facilities, and human resources to ensure the enhancement of internal airline operations.

In the late 1970s, there was a major uplift through the installation of runway and Taxiway lights and an extension of the main runway to the southern part of the Airport.

On 1 December 1993 a new Terminal building and the installation of a VOR/DME were commissioned by President Jerry John Rawlings. The airport was changed from a fully military base into a domestic airport in 1999.

In 2008, renovation works were done by Bans Consult Limited at the airport, including the rehabilitation of the arrival and departure halls, the control room, the rescue and fire station, and the construction of a VIP Lounge ahead of the African Cup of Nations 2008 (CAN 2008) which Ghana was hosting.

== Airlines and scheduled destinations ==
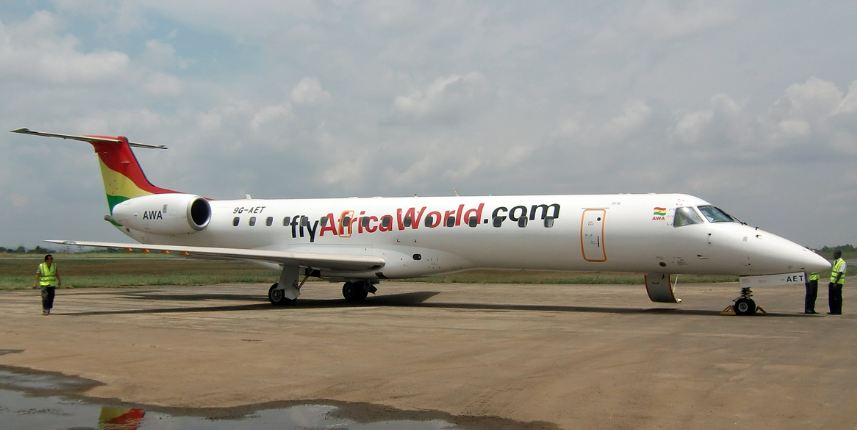
Africa World Airlines Embraer ERJ-145LR at Kumasi Airport

| Airlines | Destinations |
|---|---|
| Africa World Airlines | Accra |
| Ethiopian Airlines | London–Gatwick(Suspended) |
| Passion Air | Accra |

== Statistics ==
These data show, the number of passenger movements into the airport, according to the Ghana Civil Aviation Authority.

| Year | 2016 | 2017 | 2018 | 2019 | 2020 | 2021 | 2022 | 2023 | 2024 | 2025 |
|---|---|---|---|---|---|---|---|---|---|---|
| Passengers | 226,984 | 244,673 | 205,962 | 376,823 | 229,127 | 417,510 | 476,266 | 406,716 | 453,201 | 486,859 |
| Reference | | | | | | | | | | |

== Upgrades to an international airport ==
The Prempeh I International Airport attained international status in 2014. However, the airport only operated on a regional level, even though it had had the full complement of security, customs, and immigration staff in place since 2003. Even though it had attained that status, work to upgrade the physical structures had yet to be fully put in place. The Prempeh I International Airport has undergone several rehabilitations and upgrades to help ensure its status as an international airport.

In 2012, initial renovation works were started on the existing facilities involved patching and filling of cracks on the main runway, construction of additional waiting rooms and building a car park to make way for future renovation and upgrades targeted for the following year.

As of 2023, the airport was purely serving domestic air traffic.

=== Expansion projects ===
==== Phase 1 ====
In 2013, the Government of Ghana embarked upon a phased development of the Prempeh I International Airport to provide the requisite infrastructure for safe domestic and international operations to ensure safety and comfort for passengers whilst ensuring Ghana had a fully functioning international airport along with Accra International Airport.

Phase 1 works to upgrade the Prempeh I International Airport to international standard was scheduled to be completed by the end of 2014. The first phase consisted of the rehabilitation of the defective runway and installation of airfield lights and aeronautical ground lights on the runway to facilitate night operations at the airport. The commissioning of the Phase 1 which happened in December 2014, was earmarked with a historic first night landing by the then President John Dramani Mahama. Prior to this upgrade an Instrument Landing System (ILS) was installed to aid pilots for take off and land.

==== Phase 2 ====
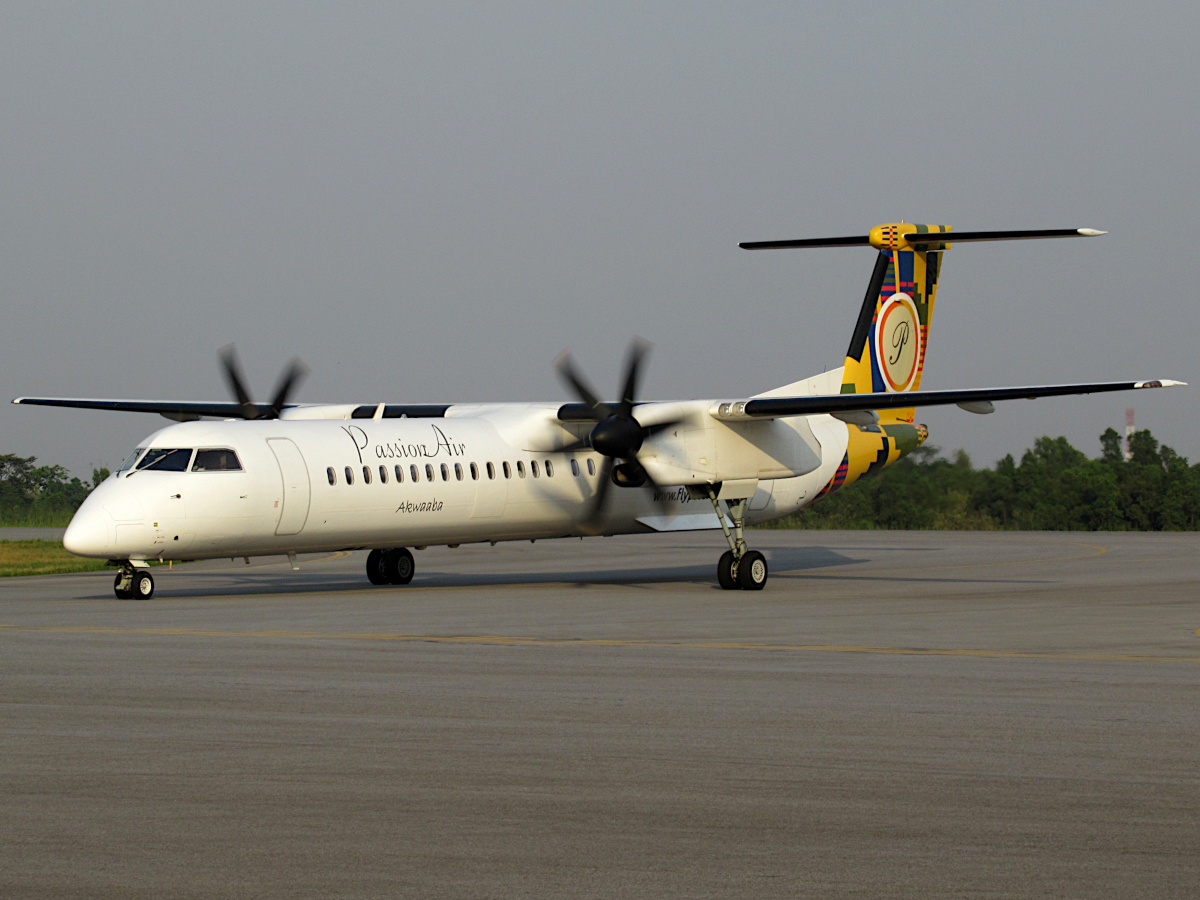
Passion Air Bombardier Dash8-Q400 registered 9G-MRH at Kumasi Airport in Kumasi, Ghana

Plans to start working on the phase 2 which is to cost around €65 million had been decided by November 2016, the project covered mainly the construction of a new two-storey ultra-modern terminal of 7,000 square metres of space based on a 400-passenger per hour and an annual passenger traffic forecast of 1,500,000, parking areas and a ring road around the airport. The building is to also include spaces like VVIP and VIP lounges, restaurants, commercial areas, three boarding gates, a central screening system for passengers, an IATA standard baggage handling system and also offices for the airline companies.

In December 2016, President John Mahama along with a representative of the Asantehene, Otumfuo Osei Tutu II, Asafohene Acheamfuo Kwame Akowuah cut the sod for work to begin on the second phase of the Prempeh I International Airport project by Contracta Engenhiria Ltd

In June 2018, President Nana Addo Dankwa Akufo-Addo cut sod for the second phase of the expansion of Prempeh I International Airport, which is expected to be completed in 24 months. It will see the expansion of the runway from 1,981 meters to 2,300 meters and the construction of a new terminal building with a capacity of 1 million passengers per year.

==== Phase 3 ====
In April 2019, the Parliament of Ghana approved a budget of €58.9 million for Phase 3 of the development of the Prempeh I International Airport. Phase 3 includes an extension of the terminal building, a fire station, fire access routes and an air control tower. It also includes the extension of the car park and access roads, an apron extension, a runway strip, and an airside service road. The second and third phases are currently being done concurrently and are expected to be completed by October 2022.

The Prempeh I International Airport is currently served by two domestic carriers, Africa World Airlines and PassionAir.

Yvonne Nana Afriyie Opare, managing director of the Ghana Airports Company Limited, has announced that the remaining construction activities at the Prempeh I International Airport are on track to be finished by September 2024. This includes the extension of the runway from its current length of 1,981 meters to 2,320 meters, which is progressing as scheduled and is also expected to be completed by September 2024.

== See also ==
- Accra (Accra International Airport) KIA
- Tamale Airport
- Ho Airport
- Takoradi Airport
