= Ghana Civil Aviation Authority =

Regulatory agency of the Republic of Ghana

GCAA
- Ghana Civil Aviation Authority
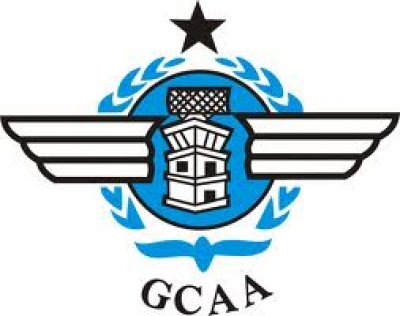
- Official seal and emblem

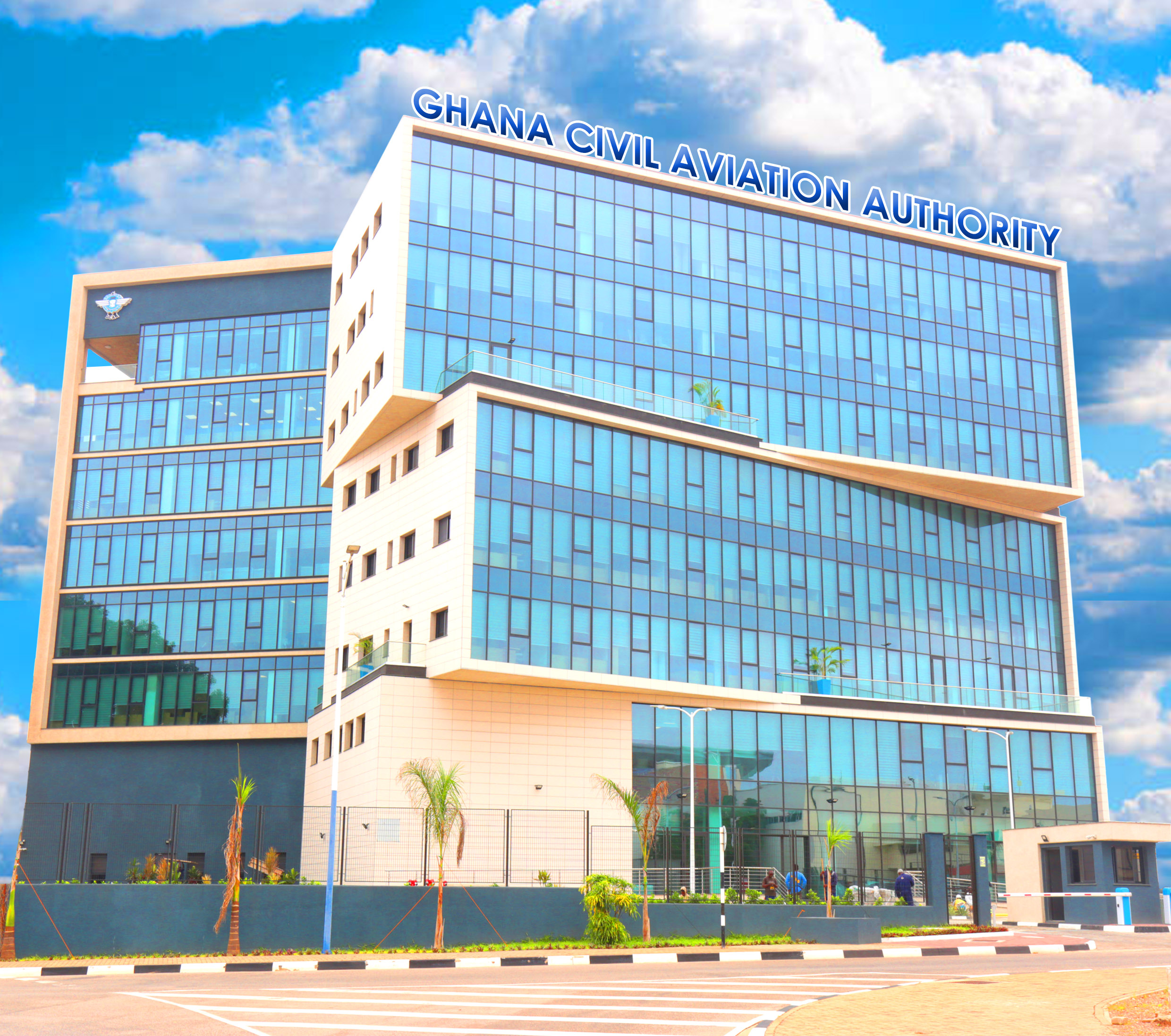
- GCAA headquarters in Accra, Ghana

Agency overview
- Formed: 1930
- Preceding agency: Ministry of Aviation (Ghana)
- Superseding agency: Ministry of Transport (Ghana)
- Jurisdiction: Republic of Ghana
- Headquarters: Accra, Ghana
- Employees: 476 (2023)
- Agency executives: Capt. Powis Deakens Spencer, Chairman; Rev. Stephen Wilfred Arthur, Director General
- Website: www.gcaa.com.gh

GCAA or Ghana Civil Aviation Authority is the civil aviation authority and regulatory agency of the Republic of Ghana for air transportation in the country. It has its headquarters in Kotoka Airport in Accra.

It also provides air navigation services within the Accra Flight Information Region (FIR), which comprises the airspace over the Republic of Ghana and a large area over the Atlantic Ocean in the Gulf of Guinea. Togo and Benin took over their Airspace in 2015.

== History ==
The Ghana Civil Aviation Authority (GCAA) was established by PNDC Law 151 on May 16, 1986, to provide air navigation services, operate and manage all aerodromes in Ghana, as well as regulate the aviation industry in the country.

The development of Ghana’s aviation industry dates back to 1918 when the idea of aerial transportation for the then Gold Coast was conceived.

Starting as a unit within the Public Works Development in 1930, Civil Aviation was granted Departmental status in 1953, under the Ministry of Transport and Communications. It remained a Department until May 16, 1986, when it assumed the status of a corporate body under the Ministry.

In November 2004, PNDC Law 151, was amended with the enactment of the Ghana Civil Aviation Act, 2004 (Act 678). The Act mandated the ceding of the airport management function of GCAA to a new entity to enable the Authority focus on its core mandate of regulating the air transport industry and providing air navigation services.

In line with the Act, a new entity, the Ghana Airports Company Limited (GACL), was incorporated on 17 January 2006 to manage and operate all government-owned airports in the country.

The Ghana Civil Aviation (Amendment) Acts of 2016 (Act 906) and 2019 (Act 985) were passed to expand the GCAA’s functions, incorporating international conventions and enhancing its safety and regulatory roles.

In August 2024, the new Ghana Civil Aviation Act 2024 (Act 1120) was promulgated. The law repealed Act 678 and its amendments, Acts 906 and 985. The new Act re-established the Authority as an autonomous entity responsible for aviation safety and security. Act 1120 also ensures compliance with new ICAO Standards and Recommended Practices and strengthens the Ghanaian civil aviation system by ensuring there is in place a robust and modern legal framework to guide all aviation operations.

Ghana, obtained an effective Implementation (EI) rate of 89.89%, the highest by an African country at the time after the International Civil Aviation Organization (ICAO) concluded its Coordinated Validation Mission (ICVM) in April 2019.

Again, Parliament passed the Air Navigation Services Agency Bill on November 4, 2020, creating the legal framework for the establishment of an autonomous entity out of GCAA, in line with the Standards and Recommended Practices (SARPs) of ICAO.

== Functions of GCAA Under 678 ==
The role of the GCAA, as stipulated in the new Act 1120 (as amended) includes the inter alia:

1. Ensure compliance with international standards in civil aviation.
2. Provide advice to Government on matters of civil aviation.
3. Acting internationally as the national body for civil aviation in Ghana.
4. Giving effect to civil aviation treaties entered into by Ghana.
5. Regulating flight standards in the industry including the licensing, certification and approval of all aircraft, air operators, flight crew and licensed aviation personnel.
6. Regulating the provision of air navigation services in Ghana.
7. Regulating airports and airport service providers in Ghana.
8. Regulating aviation security.
9. Economic regulation of airlines, airports and other allied aviation services.
10. Coordinating the implementation of the State Safety Programme; and
11. Any other function necessary to attain the objects of the Authority.

(Source: GCAA www.gcaa.com.gh)
