= Accra International Airport =

International airport in Accra, Ghana

Accra International Airport Accra Air Force Station
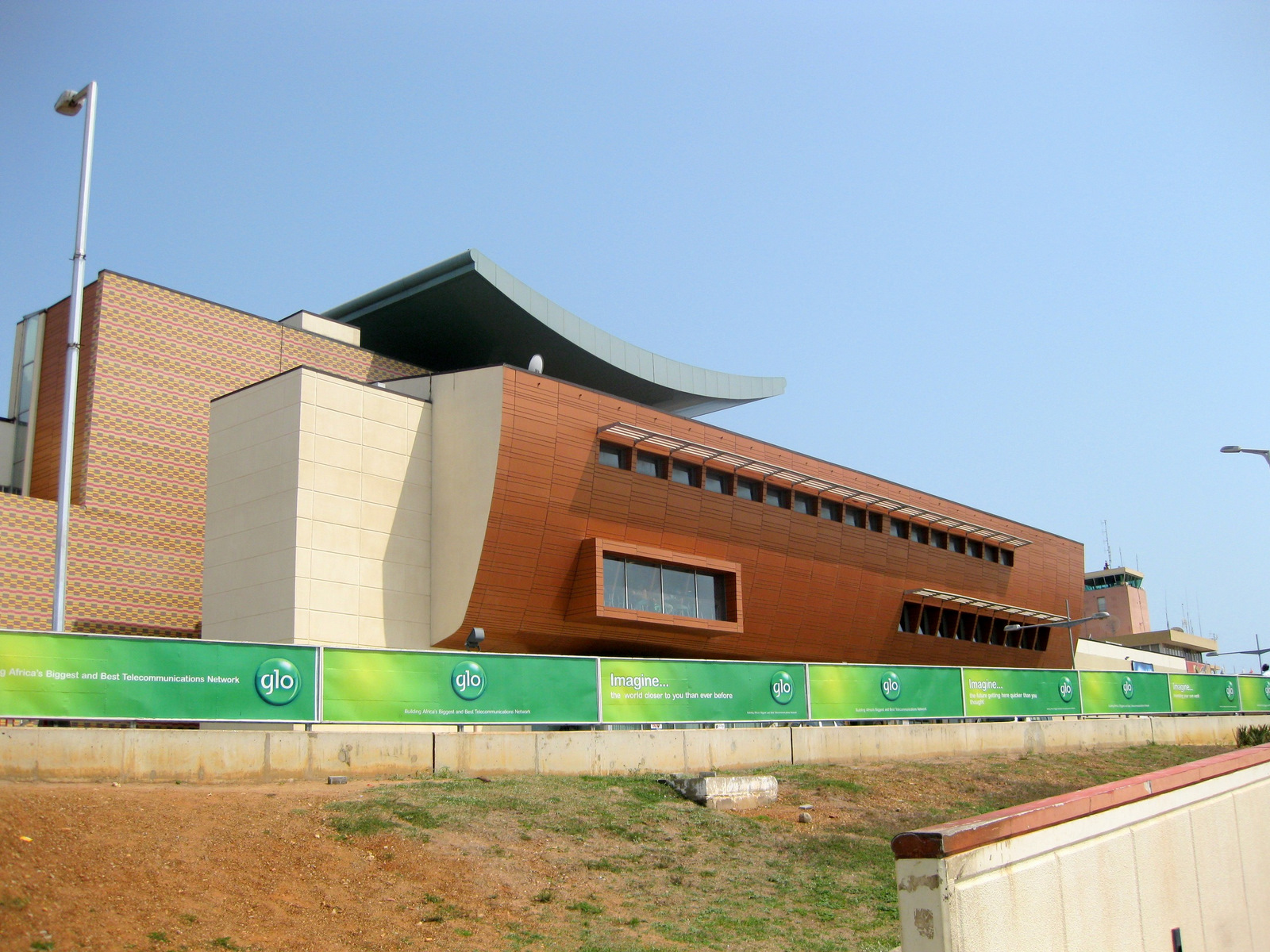
- IATA: ACC; ICAO: DGAA

Summary
- Airport type: Public
- Operator: GACL
- Serves: Accra, Greater Accra
- Hub for: Africa World Airlines, Passion Air
- Time zone: GMT (0+)
- Elevation AMSL: 62 m (203 ft)
- Coordinates: 05°36′16.8″N 000°10′02.6″W
- Website: gacl.com.gh

Map
- Location of the airport in Ghana ACC (Africa)

Runways
Direction	Length		Surface
Direction	m	ft	Surface
03/21	3,403	11,165	Asphalt

Statistics (2025)
- Passengers: 3,624,087

Accra International Airport (IATA: ACC, ICAO: DGAA), formerly known as Kotoka International Airport, is an international airport in Accra, the capital of Ghana. The airport is operated by Ghana Airports Company Limited (GACL), which has its offices on the airport property. Until the upgrading of the Tamale and Kumasi airports to international standards, AIA, for a long time, was the sole international airport in Ghana.

In 2025, the airport served a record 3.62 million passengers, a recovery from the 1.2 million in 2020 (reduced due to the COVID-19 pandemic). It presently serves as a hub for domestic and regional operator Africa World Airlines and a base for domestic operator Passion Air.

The airport has two passenger terminals: Terminal 2 and Terminal 3. Terminal 2 handles only domestic flights, while Terminal 3 serves regional, international, and long-haul flights. Terminal 1 is presently no longer in use but will be redeveloped into an FBO. Terminal 3 has the capacity for large aircraft such as the Airbus A380.

The airport has been recognized as the "Best Airport in Africa" (2-5 million pax per annum) for 2019, 2020 and 2021 by Airports Council International.

== History ==
The airport was originally a military airport used by the British Royal Air Force during World War II. The facility was handed over to civilian authorities after the war. A development project was launched in 1956 by President Kwame Nkrumah to reconfigure the structure into a terminal building. The project was completed in 1958, turning the military base into an airport with a capacity of 500,000 passengers per year. The airport was originally named Accra International Airport.

In 1969, the Accra International Airport was renamed Kotoka International Airport in honour of Lieutenant General Emmanuel Kwasi Kotoka (1926–1967), a member of the National Liberation Council. Kotoka was killed in an abortive coup attempt at a location that is now the forecourt of the airport.

=== Controversy over denomination ===
There has been debate over the years as to whether it was fitting to rename the airport from Accra International Airport to Kotoka International Airport from General Emmanuel Kwasi Kotoka. Many argue that the airport was built by Kwame Nkrumah, whose government was overthrown by a coup led by Kotoka.

On 23 February 2026, the airport's designation was officially changed back to Accra International Airport, having previously been known as Kotoka International Airport.

=== Terminal 3 ===
Construction officially commenced on 1 March 2016 on a new $274 million Terminal 3, which is capable of handling 5 million passengers a year, with an expansion potential of up to 6.5 million. The sod-cutting was done by President John Dramani Mahama and Turkish President Recep Tayyip Erdogan. The new Terminal 3 will handle 1,250 passengers an hour and is equipped with three business lounges, a large commercial and retail area and six boarding bridges. The terminal opened to passengers on 15 September 2018 and officially inaugurated on 2 October by President Nana Akufo-Addo.

== Airlines and destinations ==
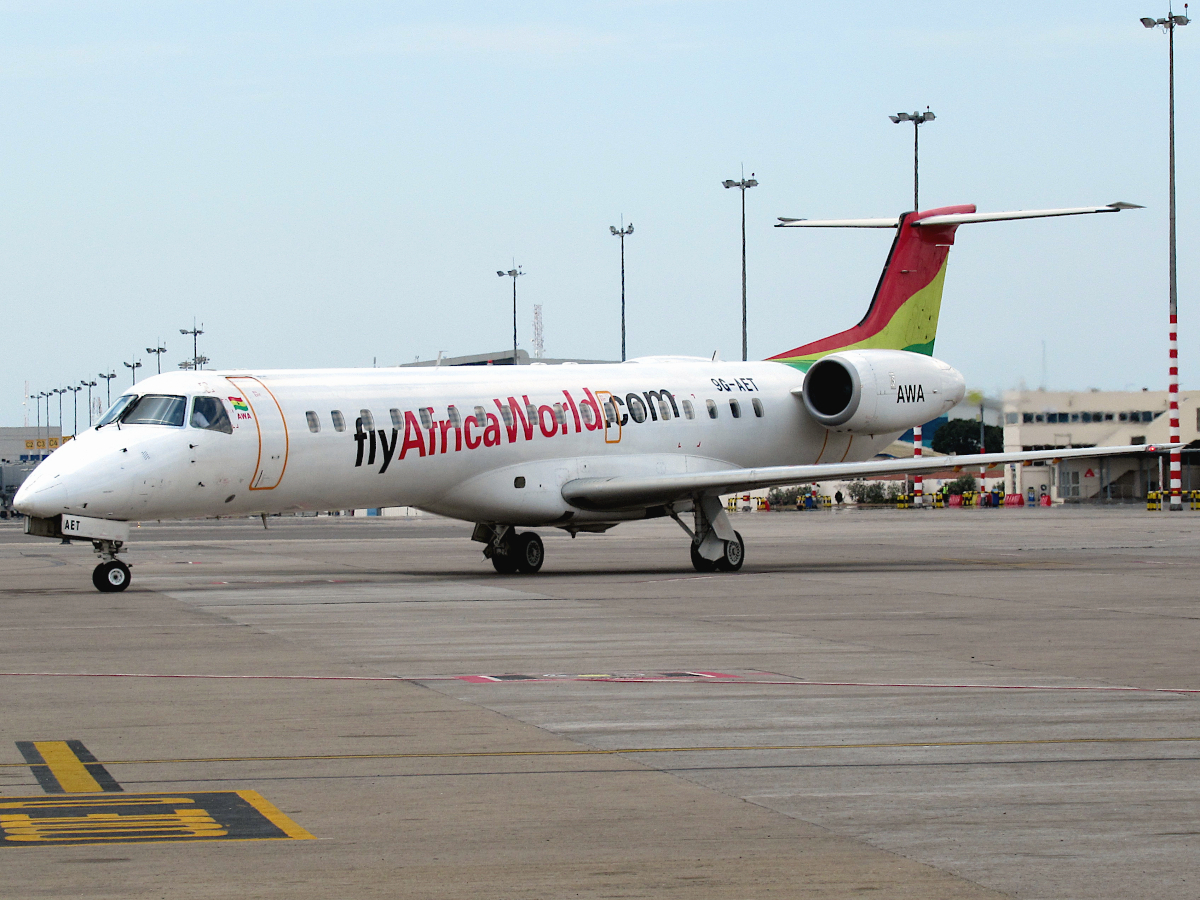
An Africa World Airlines ERJ-145LR at Accra International Airport

Terminal 3 Departure Hall at Accra International Airport

=== Passenger ===
Airlines	Destinations
Africa World Airlines	Abuja, Conakry, Kumasi,Lagos, Ouagadougou,Takoradi,Tamale,
Air Burkina	Ouagadougou
Air Côte d'Ivoire	Abidjan
Air Peace	Lagos, Monrovia–Roberts, Freetown
Air Tanzania	Dar es Salaam
ASKY	Lomé, Monrovia–Roberts, Freetown, Banjul
British Airways	London–Gatwick, London–Heathrow
Brussels Airlines	Brussels,
Delta Air Lines	New York–JFK; Seasonal: Atlanta
Ethiopian Airlines	Addis Ababa
Etihad Airways	Abu Dhabi (begins 17 March 2027)
EgyptAir	Cairo
Emirates	Abidjan, Dubai–International
Gianair	Obuasi
Ibom Air	Lagos, Abuja, Uyo
ITA Airways	Rome–Fiumicino
Kenya Airways	Freetown, Monrovia–Roberts, Nairobi–Jomo Kenyatta
KLM	Amsterdam
Middle East Airlines	Beirut
Passion Air	Sunyani, Kumasi, Tamale, Wa Takoradi
Qatar Airways	Doha
Royal Air Maroc	Casablanca
RwandAir	Kigali
South African Airways	Abidjan, Johannesburg
TAP Portugal	Lisbon, Sao Tome
Turkish Airlines	Istanbul
Uganda Airlines	Entebbe
United Airlines	Washington–Dulles
United Nigeria Airlines	Abuja, Lagos
ValueJet	Banjul, Lagos

=== Cargo ===
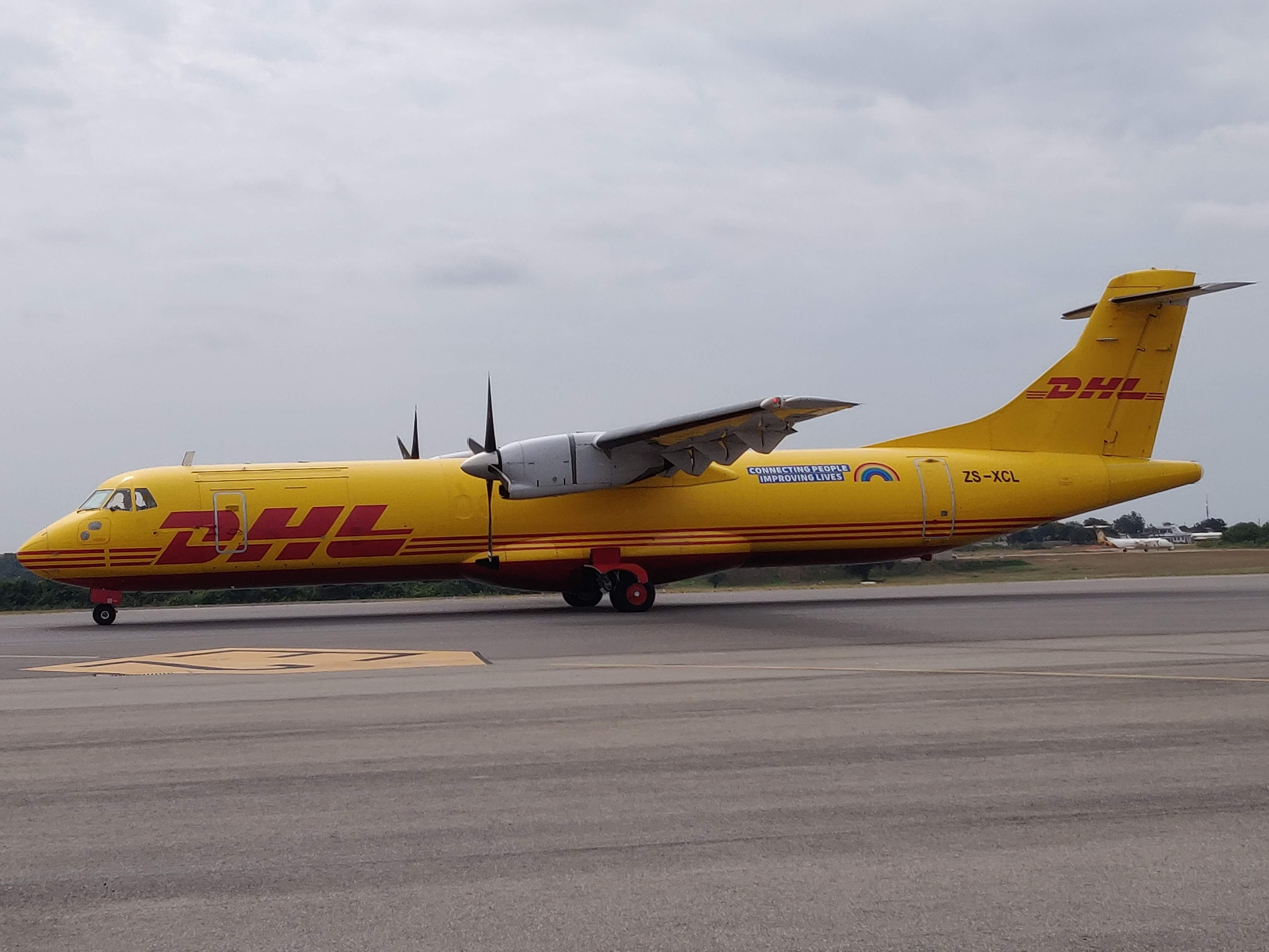
An ATR 72 freighter of DHL Aviation at Accra International Airport

Accra International Airport is served by numerous cargo airlines on a regularly scheduled basis, in addition to ad-hoc cargo flights.

- Air Ghana
- Cargolux
- DHL Aviation
- Emirates SkyCargo
- Ethiopian Airlines Cargo
- Qatar Airways Cargo
- Turkish Cargo

In 2016, Air Ghana opened the Ghana Airport Cargo Center, a 10,000 sq.m dedicated cargo warehouse facility supplemented by 9,000 sq.m of office space, in partnership with Ghana Airports Company Limited and Swissport.

== Statistics ==
The activity of passengers, cargo and flight movements through the airport each year is given in the table below:

Airport statistics for Accra International Airport, by year
Year	Domestic pax	International pax	Transit pax	Total passengers	Aircraft Movements	Cargo (tons)
2010	132,922 ▲	1,387,045 ▲	117,478 ▲	1,637,445 ▲	30,104 ▲	45,615 ▲
2011	199,073 ▲	1,586,602 ▲	145,760 ▲	1,931,435 ▲	32,439 ▲	50,260 ▲
2012	543,379 ▲	1,726,051 ▲	154,723 ▲	2,424,153 ▲	36,434 ▲	46,577 ▼
2013	778,466 ▲	1,669,603 ▼	162,305 ▲	2,610,374 ▲	41,934 ▲	43,688 ▼
2014	719,234 ▼	1,650,520 ▼	177,773 ▲	2,547,527 ▼	41,949 ▲	54,389 ▲
2015	525,440 ▼	1,667,675 ▲	157,003 ▼	2,350,118 ▼	37,611 ▼	51,325 ▼
2016	421,986 ▼	1,746,669 ▲	213,232 ▲	2,381,887 ▲	36,349 ▼	47,678 ▼
2017	483,261 ▲	1,811,428 ▲	214,650 ▲	2,509,339 ▲	39,217 ▲	50,360 ▲
2018	415,158 ▼	1,975,803 ▲	202,451 ▼	2,593,412 ▲	39,255 ▲	52,390 ▲
2019	690,314 ▲	2,110,593 ▲	218,157 ▲	3,019,064 ▲	46,966 ▲	49,846 ▼
2020	423,718 ▼	702,651 ▼	31,041 ▼	1,157,410 ▼	25,183 ▼	43,428 ▼
2021	722,721 ▲	1,269,898 ▲	117,008 ▲	2,109,627 ▲	37,870 ▲	46,700 ▲
2022	852,101 ▲	1,800,341 ▲	152,905 ▲	2,805,347 ▲	43,970 ▲	38,998 ▼
2023	775,662 ▼	2,138,999 ▲	181,015 ▲	3,095,676 ▲	43,858 ▼	40,774▲
2024	862,727 ▲	2,349,024 ▲	189,463 ▲	3,401,214 ▲	45,262 ▲	42,767▲
2025	903,227 ▲	2,539,034 ▲	181,826 ▼	3,624,087 ▲	47,262 ▲	46,372▲

== Airport City ==
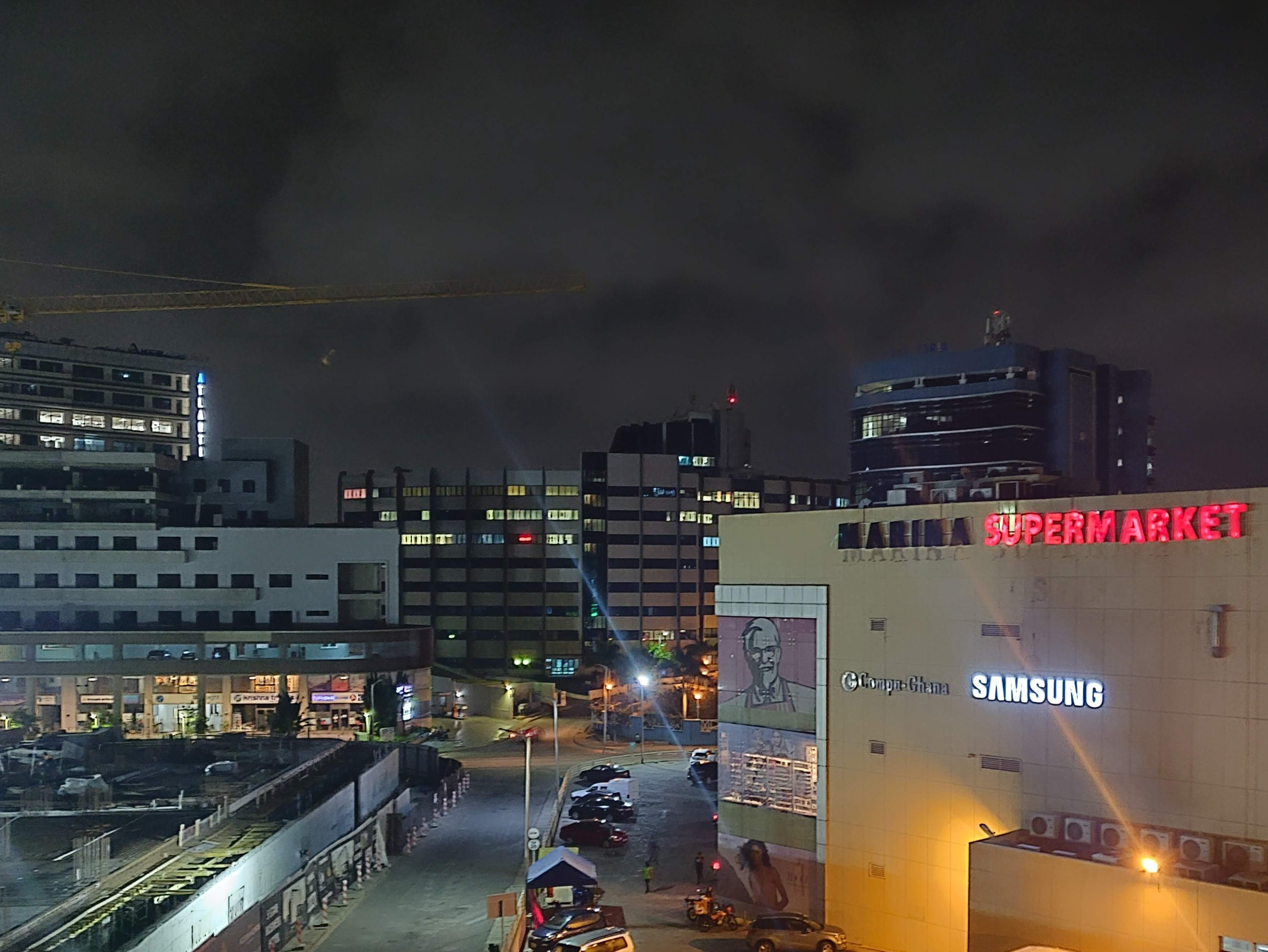
Airport City enclave in Accra at night in 2020

Airport City Accra is an urban development centred around Accra International Airport.

The development is promoted by Ghana Airports Company Limited on the principle that airports have ceased to be mere terminals, but rather economic growth outlets to promote trade and generate employment.

Developments within Airport City include retail outlets such as Marina Mall, hotels such as Accra Marriott Hotel, ibis Styles Accra and Holiday Inn Accra Airport, as well as corporate offices for companies such as Africa World Airlines and Vodafone Ghana. Projects underway include the five-star Pullman Accra Airport City by Accor and the Protea Hotel by Marriott Accra Airport.

International airlines such as American Airlines, Brussels Airlines and Turkish Airlines also have their ticketing and sales offices located within Airport City.

Airport City is expected to host multiple stations on the proposed Accra Sky Train system.

== Military use ==
The airport shares its facilities with Air Force Base Accra, an installation of the Ghana Air Force. It hosts a squadron of Airbus C295 transport aircraft, as well as a helicopter squadron with Harbin Z-9 and Mil Mi-17 utility helicopters.

== Accidents and incidents ==
- On 5 June 2000, a Ghana Airlink Fokker F-27 en route from Tamale to Accra crashed on approach to Accra International Airport. Six people were killed.
- On 28 January 2009, a Ghana International Airlines Boeing 757 operating from Accra to London Gatwick, United Kingdom, with 96 passengers and nine crew reported anomalies with the control systems when climbing out of Accra. The crew declared a mayday and made a safe return to Accra International Airport where the remains of a beetle-like creature were discovered to be obstructing the left pitot system.
- On 2 June 2012, an Allied Air Boeing 727 cargo aircraft operating from Lagos to Accra on behalf of DHL with 4 crew overshot the runway while landing in heavy rain. At least 12 people on the ground were killed. The 4 crew all survived.

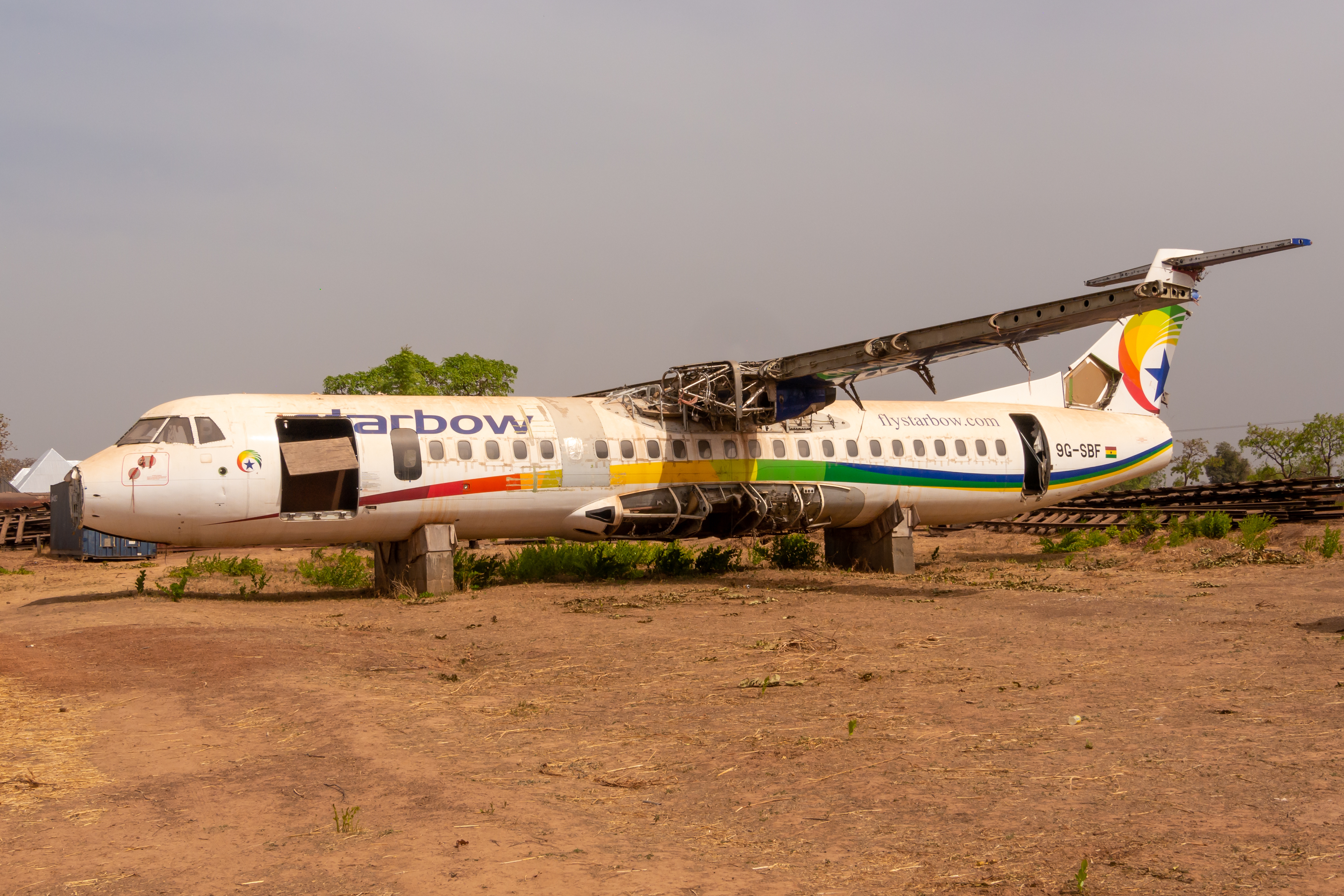
Damaged Starbow ATR 72–500 on display near Tamale

- On 28 October 2014, a Starbow BAe 146-200 from Accra to Takoradi Airport with 77 people on board suffered a hydraulic failure during climb out. The crew were forced to make an emergency landing in Accra without flaps, resulting in damage to the landing gear and a fire. Two persons were injured in the resulting emergency evacuation. The aircraft was written off.
- On 10 January 2015, an ASKY Airlines Boeing 737-43QSF (leased from Ethiopian Airlines), was damaged beyond repair in a landing accident and runway excursion. The aircraft was written off and there were no fatalities.
- On 25 November 2017, a Starbow ATR 72-500 suffered a runway excursion due to the captain's seat sliding backward during the take-off roll. The aircraft struck the airport perimeter fence before coming to a halt. Five passengers were injured, and the aircraft was written off with significant damage.

== COVID-19 pandemic ==
Due to the COVID-19 pandemic, domestic flights in Ghana were suspended from 30 March 2020, but resumed on 1 May 2020 under enhanced sanitary protocols.

The international air borders of Ghana reopened for travellers on 1 September 2020, subject to certain conditions. Passengers were required to undergo a PCR test in their country of origin no more than 72 hours prior to departure, and also undergo a further rapid antigen test upon arrival at Accra International Airport. A laboratory was set up at the airport for prompt processing of test results. The cost of the tests were set at US$50 for citizens of ECOWAS countries, and US$150 for all other citizens. Those testing negative on both tests were permitted to enter Ghana without any further quarantine or restrictions, subject to clearance by Ghana Immigration Service.

In February 2021, the process of awarding the contract for testing at the airport to Frontiers Healthcare came under scrutiny for its lack of transparency during the vetting hearings for various ministers appointed to the second cabinet of President Nana Akufo-Addo.

In March 2022, the parliamentary opposition threatened to demonstrate at the airport in protest against the continued high costs for on-arrival testing of passengers. Industry experts also warned that the high costs of testing were likely to suppress passenger numbers for 2022 if not addressed as a priority. In response to this, the testing requirements for fully vaccinated passengers were waived effective 28 March 2022.
