= List of companies based in the Gambia =

Location of The Gambia (dark red area within circle) on the coast of West Africa

The Gambia, officially the Republic of the Gambia, is a country in West Africa. It is surrounded by Senegal, apart from a short strip of Atlantic coastline at its western end. It is the smallest country on mainland Africa. The Gambia has a liberal, market-based economy characterised by traditional subsistence agriculture, a historic reliance on groundnuts (peanuts) for export earnings, a re-export trade built up around its ocean port, low import duties, minimal administrative procedures, a fluctuating exchange rate with no exchange controls, and a significant tourism industry.

== Companies based in The Gambia ==
- Central Bank of The Gambia
- Bank of British West Africa
- Gambia Postal Services Corporation
- Gambia Radio & Television Service
- Gamtel
- Trust Bank Limited (Gambia)
- SuGam Company Limited (Gambia)
- Borje's Tech

== By type ==
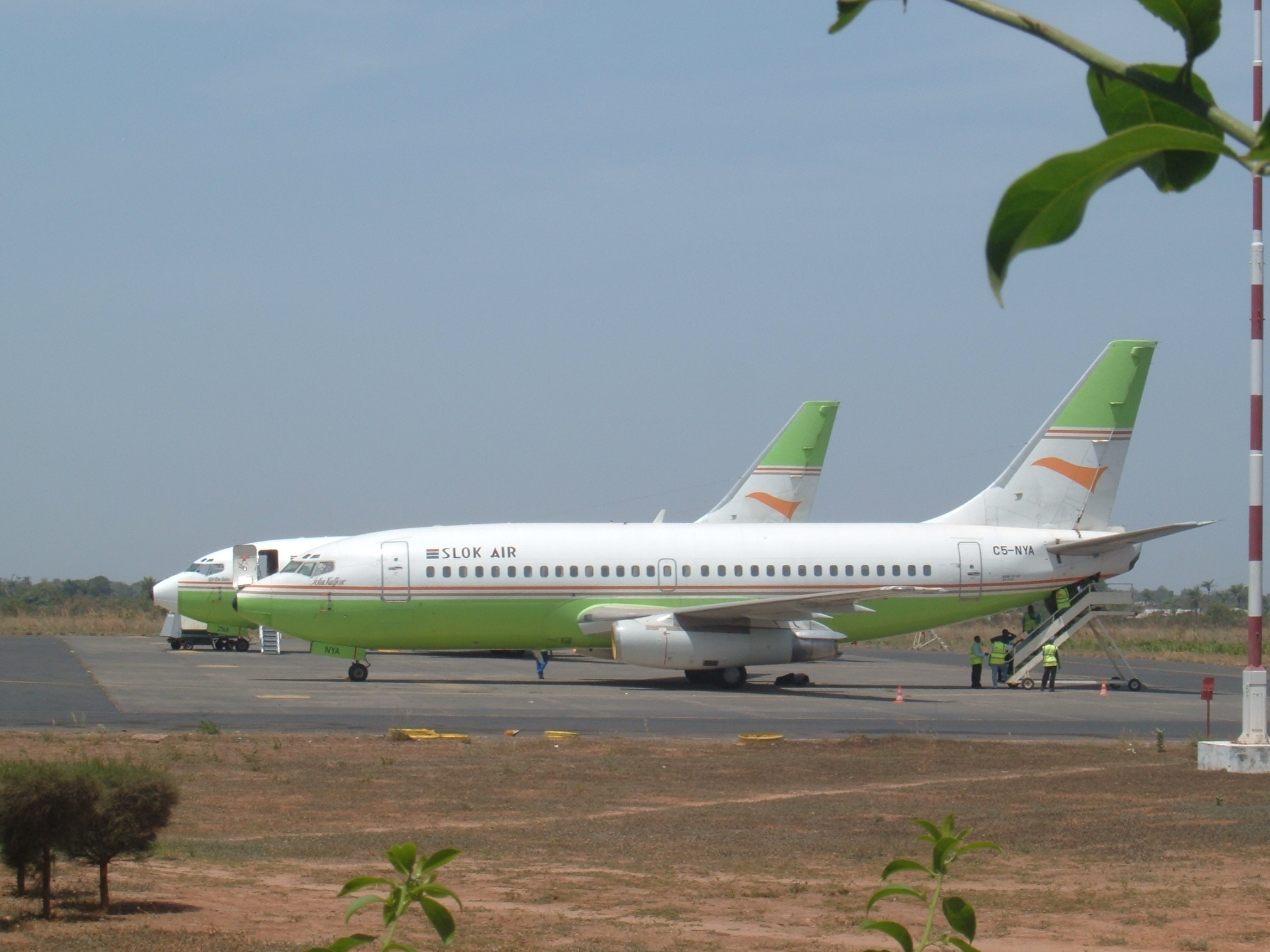
Two Slok Air International aircraft at the Banjul International Airport

== See also ==
- Economy of the Gambia
