= List of government-owned airlines =

Overview of government-owned airlines

The following is a list of government-owned airlines. The practice of government ownership of airlines, particularly flag carrier airlines, occurs in many countries. The following is a list of both airlines currently owned by a government, and former government-owned airlines.

== Current government-owned airlines ==
| Airline | Country | Stake |
|---|---|---|
| Aeroflot | (Russia) Russian Federation | As of July 2025: 73.8% |
| Aerogaviota | Cuba | 100% |
| Aerolíneas Argentinas | Argentina | As of December 2014: 100% |
| Afriqiyah Airways | Libya | 100% |
| Air Algérie | Algeria | As of December 2013: 100% |
| Air Astana | Kazakhstan | 51% |
| AirBorneo | Malaysia | 100% Sarawak Government |
| Air Botswana | Botswana | 100% |
| Air Calédonie | New Caledonia (France) | 52.45% |
| Air Cambodia | Cambodia | 51% |
| Air Canada | Canada | 6.4% |
| Air China | China | 53.46% |
| Air Congo | (Democratic Republic of the Congo) DR Congo | 51% |
| Air Côte d'Ivoire | Ivory Coast | As of April 2017: 58% |
| Air Djibouti | Djibouti | Djibouti Government minor shareholder |
| Air France | France | 28.6% (through the Air France–KLM holding company). Dutch state has a 9.3% stake |
| Air Greenland (Greenlandair) | Greenland | 100% |
| Air Kiribati | Kiribati | 100% |
| Air Koryo | North Korea | 100% |
| Air Macau | Macau | 66.9% Air China (majority shareholder - Chinese government); 5% (minority shareholder - government of Macau) |
| Air Madagascar | Madagascar | |
| Air Mauritius | Mauritius | |
| Air Montenegro | Montenegro | 100% |
| Air New Zealand | New Zealand | As of March 2020: 52% |
| Air Niugini | Papua New Guinea | 60% |
| Air Serbia | Serbia | 100% |
| Air Seychelles | Seychelles | 100% |
| Air Tanzania | Tanzania | 100% |
| Air Zimbabwe | Zimbabwe | 100% |
| AirBaltic | Latvia | 80% |
| Aircalin | New Caledonia | 100% |
| Alliance Air (India) | India | 100% |
| Ariana Afghan Airlines | Afghanistan | 100% |
| Arkaim | Russia | |
| Asman Airlines | Kyrgyzstan | |
| Aurigny | Guernsey | 100% |
| Azerbaijan Airlines | Azerbaijan | 100% |
| Bahamasair | (The Bahamas) Bahamas | 100% |
| Belavia | Belarus | 100% |
| Biman Bangladesh Airlines | Bangladesh | At least 51% |
| Boliviana de Aviación | Bolivia | 100% |
| Caribbean Airlines | Trinidad and Tobago | 87% |
| Caribbean Airlines | Jamaica | 13% |
| Cathay Pacific | Hong Kong | 6% |
| Cayman Airways | Cayman Islands | 100% |
| CEIBA Intercontinental | Equatorial Guinea | |
| China Airlines | (Taiwan) Republic of China | 31.05% China Aviation Development Foundation (CADF); 8.64% National Development Fund (NDF) |
| Congo Airways | (Democratic Republic of the Congo) DR Congo | 100% |
| Conviasa | Venezuela | 100% |
| Croatia Airlines | Croatia | 100% |
| Cubana de Aviación | Cuba | 100% |
| Druk Air | Bhutan | 100% |
| Dubai Royal Air Wing | (Emirate of Dubai) Government of Dubai (UAE) | 100% |
| EgyptAir | Egypt | 100% |
| Emirates | (Emirate of Dubai) Government of Dubai (UAE) | 100% |
| Eritrean Airlines | Eritrea | 80% Eritrean government 20% Ethiopia Airlines (Ethiopian government) |
| Ethiopian Airlines | Ethiopia | 100% |
| Etihad Airways | (Emirate of Abu Dhabi) Government of Abu Dhabi (UAE) | 100% |
| Fiji Airways | Fiji | 52% |
| Finnair | Finland | 55.8% |
| Flydubai | (Emirate of Dubai) Government of Dubai (UAE) | 100% |
| Garuda Indonesia | Indonesia | 60.54% |
| Gulf Air | Bahrain | |
| Heli Air Monaco | Monaco | 100% |
| Iran Air | Iran | 60% |
| Iraqi Airways | Iraq | 100% |
| ITA Airways | Italy | 59% |
| KM Malta Airlines | Malta | 100% |
| KLM | Netherlands | 9.3% (through the Air France–KLM holding company). French state has a 28.6% stake |
| Kuwait Airways | Kuwait | 100% |
| LADE | Argentina | 100% |
| LAM Mozambique Airlines | Mozambique | 100% |
| Lao Airlines | Laos | 100% |
| Libyan Airlines | Libya | 100% |
| LOT Polish Airlines | Poland | 100% |
| Luxair | Luxembourg | 74.98% |
| Malaysia Airlines | Malaysia | 100% |
| Mandarin Airlines | Taiwan | Fully owned subsidiary of Taiwan's China Airlines |
| Mexicana de Aviación | Mexico | 100% |
| MIAT Mongolian Airlines | Mongolia | |
| Middle East Airlines | Lebanon | 100% |
| Myanmar National Airlines | Myanmar | 100% |
| Myanmar Airways International | Myanmar | |
| Nauru Airlines | Nauru | |
| Nepal Airlines | Nepal | |
| Oman Air | Oman | |
| Philippine Airlines | Philippines | |
| Qatar Airways | Qatar | |
| Qatar Amiri Flight | Qatar | |
| Qatar Executive | Qatar | |
| RAM Cargo | Morocco | |
| Régie Malagache | Madagascar | |
| Riyadh Air | Saudi Arabia | 100% |
| Rossiya | Russia | |
| Royal Air Maroc | Morocco | 100% |
| Royal Brunei Airlines | Brunei | |
| Royal Jordanian | Jordan | 100% |
| RwandAir | Rwanda | |
| Satena | Colombia | 100% |
| Saudia | Saudi Arabia | 100% |
| Singapore Airlines | Singapore | 55.53% |
| Solomon Airlines | Solomon Islands | 100% |
| SriLankan Airlines | Sri Lanka | 99.11% |
| Sudan Airways | Sudan | 79.00% |
| Surinam Airways | Suriname | 100% |
| Syrian Air | Syria | 100% |
| TAAG Angola Airlines | Angola | 90.00% |
| TAP Portugal | Portugal | 97.75% (91.8% directly owned by the government and the remaining 8.2% owned by the TAP Group, where the government has a total share of 72.5%) |
| TAROM | Romania | 97.22% |
| Tunisair | Tunisia | |
| Turkish Airlines | Turkey | 49.12% |
| Turkmenistan Airlines | Turkmenistan | |
| Uganda Airlines | Uganda | 100% |
| Uzbekistan Airways | Uzbekistan | 100% |
| Vietnam Airlines | Vietnam | 86.10% |
| Yemenia | Yemen | 51.00% |

== List of former government-owned airlines ==
This is a list of airlines which were formerly government owned. They have since been privatized or have ceased operations.

| Airline | Country | End of government ownership | Fate |
|---|---|---|---|
| Adria Airways | Slovenia | 2019 | Bankrupt |
| Aer Lingus | (Republic of Ireland) Ireland | 2015 | Ryanair & Government held shares sold to IAG |
| Albanian Airlines | Albania | 1995 | |
| Austrian Airlines | Austria | 2009 | |
| Armenian Airlines | Armenia | 2003 | |
| Aero Caribbean | Cuba | 2015 | Merged into Cubana |
| Aeroflot-Cargo | (Russia) Russian Federation | 2010 | Merged with Aeroflot |
| Aeroméxico | Mexico | 2007 | Privatized |
| Aerotaxi | Cuba | 2009 | Ceased operations |
| Air Bissau | Guinea-Bissau | 1998 | Liquidated |
| Air Burundi | Burundi | 2009 | Ceased operations |
| Air Gabon | Gabon | 2006 | Bankrupt |
| Air Guinée | Guinea | 1992 | Privatized 1992, dissolved 2002 |
| Air India | India | 2021 | Privatized |
| Air Ivoire | Ivory Coast | 2011 | Ceased operations |
| Air Jamaica | Jamaica | 2011 | Sold to Caribbean Airlines 2011, ceased operations 2015 |
| Air Liberia | Liberia | 1990 | Ceased trading |
| Air Malawi | Malawi | 2013 | Voluntary liquidation |
| Air Mali (1960-89) | Mali | 1989 | Shut down |
| Air Niger | Niger | 1993 | Ceased operations |
| Air Rwanda | Rwanda | 2002 | Taken over by and rebranded to RwandAir |
| Air Sénégal International | Senegal | 2009 | Operations suspended |
| Air Vanuatu | Vanuatu | 2024 | Ceased trading |
| Air Zaïre | Zaire | 1995 | Bankrupt |
| Alitalia | Italy | 2021 | Bankrupt and rebranded to ITA Airways |
| Berkut Air | Kazakhstan | 2011 | Rebranded |
| British Airways | United Kingdom | 1987 | Privatised |
| Cabo Verde Airlines | (Cape Verde) Cabo Verde | 2019 | Privatized |
| Cameroon Airlines | Cameroon | 2008 | Ceased operations |
| Cyprus Airways (1947–2015) | Cyprus | 2015 | Bankruptcy |
| Czech Airlines | Czech Republic | 2024 | Shut down |
| Donavia | Russia | 2016 | Merged with Rossiya Airlines |
| Ecuato Guineana | Equatorial Guinea | ~ 2007 | Unknown |
| Eurocypria Airlines | Cyprus | 2010 | Bankruptcy |
| Gambia Airways | (The Gambia) Gambia | 1996 | Bankrupt |
| Gambia International Airlines | (The Gambia) Gambia | 2007 | Shut down |
| Ghana Airways | Ghana | 2004 | Ceased operations |
| Guine Bissau Airlines | (Guinea-Bissau) Guinea Bissau | 2003 | |
| Iberia (airline) | Spain | 2001 | Privatized |
| Indian Airlines | India | 2011 | Ceased operations (Merged with Air India) |
| Japan Airlines | Japan | 1987 | Privatized |
| Korean Air | South Korea | 1969 | Privatized |
| LAN Chile | Chile | 1994 | Privatized |
| Lina Congo | (Republic of the Congo) Republic of Congo | 2002 | Dissolved |
| Lufthansa | Germany | 1994 | Privatized |
| Malév Hungarian Airlines | Hungary | 2012 | Ceased operations |
| Merpati Nusantara Airlines | Indonesia | 2014 | Ceased operations |
| Nordica | Estonia | 2019 | Privatized, then Ceased operations in 2024 |
| Norfolk Air | / Norfolk Island, Australia | 2011 | Ceased operations |
| NorOntair | / Ontario, Canada | 1996 | Ceased operations |
| Olympic Airlines | Greece | 2009 | Shut down |
| Pakistan International Airlines | Pakistan | 2026 | Privatized |
| Qantas | Australia | 1992 | Privatized |
| Royal Swazi National Airways | Eswatini | 1999 | Ceased operations |
| Sierra National Airlines | Sierra Leone | 2004 | Ceased operations |
| Scandinavian Airlines (SAS) | Denmark; Sweden; Norway | 2001 | Since 2001, +50% stocks are publicly traded. The Norwegian government confirmed it sold its stake in 2018. In 2024, the Norwegian government once again received a stake, when SAS used stocks to repay part of a 2020 loan. Government stakes remain: 14.24% (Danish government); 2.1% (Norwegian government); 14.82% (Swedish government) |
| South Africa Express | South Africa | 2020 | Liquidated |
| South African Airways | South Africa | 2022 | Privatized |
| Kenya Airways | Kenya | 1996 | Government owns minority stake (48.9%) |
| TAME | Ecuador | 2020 | Liquidated |
| TANS Perú | Peru | 2006 | Shut down |
| Thai Airways International | Thailand | 2020 | Privatized |
| Toumaï Air Tchad | Chad | 2012 | Ceased operations |
| Uganda Airlines (1976-2001) | Uganda | 2001 | Liquidated |
| Ukraine International Airlines | Ukraine | 2011 | Privatized |
| Ukrainian Cargo Airways | Ukraine | 2009 | Shut down |
| Varig | Brazil | 1999 | |
| Royal Tongan Airlines | Tonga | 2004 | |
| Zambia Airways | Zambia | 1994 | Ceased operations |

== See also ==
- Flag carrier
- Government-owned corporation
- List of airlines
- List of government-owned companies
