= Afrinat International Airlines =

Airline headquartered in Bakau, the Gambia

IATA	ICAO	Call sign
Q9	AFU	AFRINAT
- Founded: 2002
- Ceased operations: 2004
- Operating bases: Banjul International Airport
- Fleet size: 1 (at closure)
- Headquarters: Bakau, the Gambia

Afrinat International Airlines was an airline headquartered in Bakau, the Gambia. It was founded in 2002, and provided scheduled services within West Africa out of Banjul International Airport. In 2004, the airline ceased to exist.

== History ==
Afrinat International Airlines was created in 2002 by West African businessmen looking to fill the gap left by the disparition of Air Afrique by directly connecting New York's JFK Airport to West African cities. Its first president was Samule Ofori. Afrinat was originally based in the USA.

Afrinat started with 2 aircraft: 1 Boeing 747 (411 passengers, 32 in business) and 1 Boeing 767 (250 passengers, 32 in business).

In April 2003, Afrinat started daily flights connecting New York and Banjul, and serving as a regional hub to West African countries (Ghana, Guinea, Mali, Ivory Coast, Sierra Leone, and Cameroon).

== Fleet ==
The Afrinat International Airlines fleet consisted of a single McDonnell Douglas DC-9-30 jet aircraft.

== Destinations ==
As of 2004, Afrinat served the following destinations:

- The Gambia
  - Banjul (Banjul International Airport)
- Ghana
  - Accra (Accra International Airport)
- Guinea
  - Conakry (Conakry International Airport)
- Mali
  - Bamako (Senou International Airport)
- Senegal
  - Dakar (Dakar-Yoff-Léopold Sédar Senghor International Airport)
- Sierra Leone
  - Freetown (Lungi International Airport)

== See also ==
- List of defunct airlines of the Gambia
- Transport in the Gambia
