= Atlantic Express =

Atlantic Express may refer to:

- Atlantic Express (airline), a trading name for Atlantic Air Transport, a British airline.
- Atlantic Express (Gambia airline) a Gambian airline 2004–2005
- Atlantic Express, the previous name for U.S.-based Eos Airlines
- Atlantic Express (bus company), a public and school bus operating company in the United States
- Atlantic Express, a named train operated by the Canadian Pacific Railway
- Atlantic Express and Pacific Express, a named train operated by the Erie Railroad
- Atlantic Coast Express, a former express passenger train between London and seaside resorts

== See also ==
- Atlantic City Express (disambiguation)
