= Slok Air International =

Gambian airline

IATA	ICAO	Call sign
S0	OKS	SLOK GAMBIA
- Founded: September 1996
- Hubs: Banjul International Airport
- Focus cities: Dakar-Yoff-Léopold Sédar Senghor International Airport
- Fleet size: 6
- Destinations: 8
- Headquarters: Lagos
- Key people: Abdulkareem Idris (Chief Executive Officer)
- Website: Previous official website

Slok Air International (Gambia) Ltd was a scheduled passenger airline registered in Gambia. Its main base was at Banjul International Airport in Banjul, the Gambia.

== History ==
=== Slok Air and Slok Air Gambia ===
Slok Air International was founded in Nigeria by the Slok Group.

Service was halted in the end of December 2007 due to maintenance and was resumed mid-February 2008, but by July published reports described financial difficulties with the airline, which continued into the autumn of 2008 with creditors filling lawsuits against the firm, seeking payments. By the end of October 2008, despite any formal announcement, press release, or news report, it was no longer possible to book flights with the airline, which had stopped flying.

=== Slok Air International ===
Once again, the airline was renamed to Slok Air International in early 2009. Flights re-commenced in February of the same year.

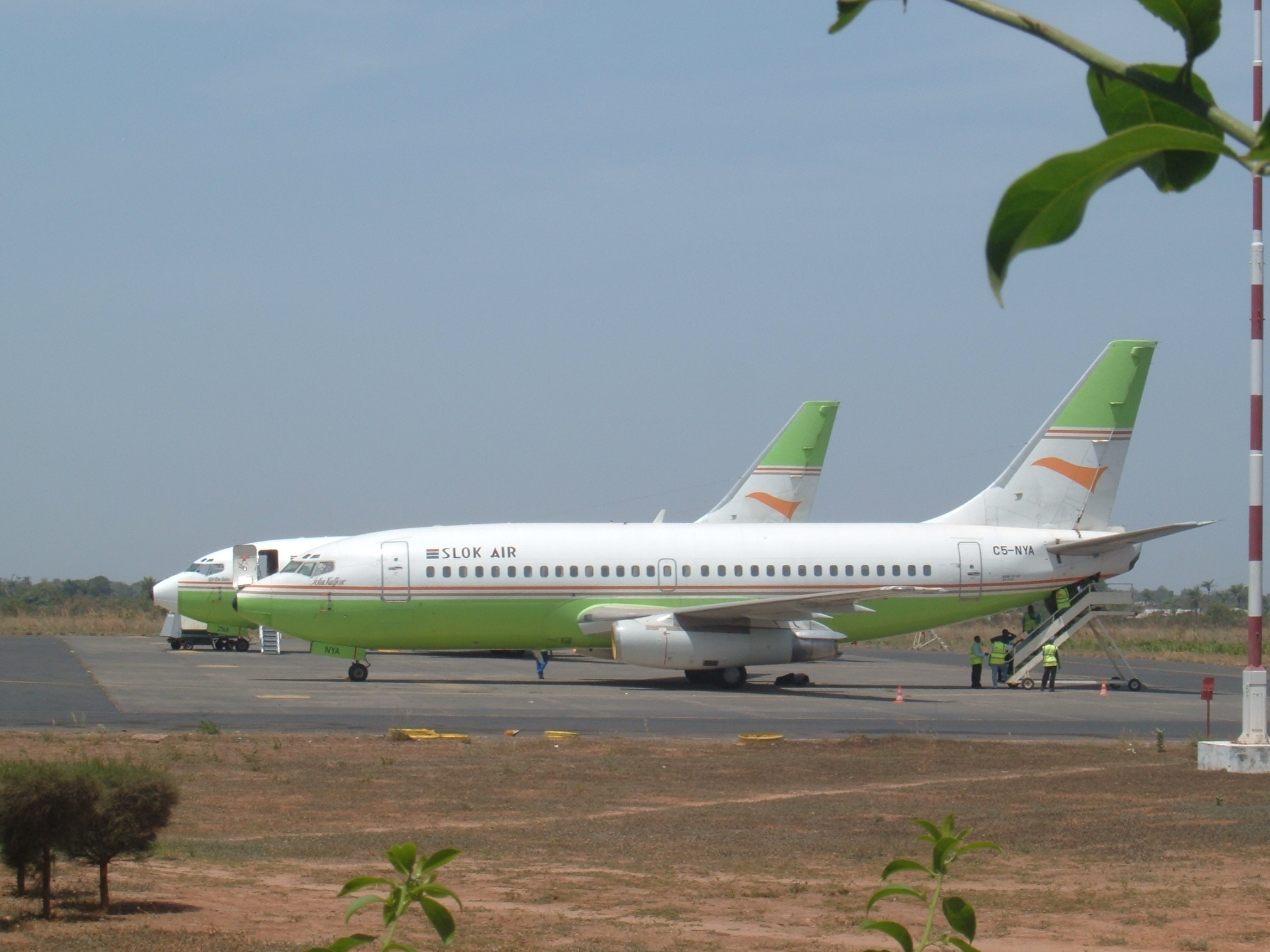
2 SLOK AIR aircraft at the Banjul International Airport

== Destinations ==
- Côte d'Ivoire
  - Abidjan (Port Bouet Airport)
- The Gambia
  - Banjul (Banjul International Airport)
- Ghana
  - Accra (Accra International Airport)
- Guinea
  - Conakry (Conakry International Airport)
- Liberia
  - Monrovia (Roberts International Airport)
- Mali
  - Bamako (Senou International Airport)
- Senegal
  - Dakar (Dakar-Yoff-Léopold Sédar Senghor International Airport)
- Sierra Leone
  - Freetown (Lungi International Airport)

== Fleet ==
The Slok Air International fleet consisted of the following aircraft:

- 6 Boeing 737-200 (only 1 used for scheduled services)

== See also ==
- List of defunct airlines of the Gambia
- Transport in the Gambia
