= List of banks in the Gambia =

This is a list of commercial banks in the Gambia, as updated by the Central Bank of the Gambia in late 2024.

== List of commercial banks ==
- Access Bank (Gambia) Limited, part of Access Bank Group
- Agib Bank Gambia Limited (Islamic Bank)
- Banque Sahelo-Saherienne Pour L'Investissement et Commerce (BSIC), part of BSIC Group
- Bloom Bank Africa (Gambia) Limited
- Ecobank (Gambia) Limited, part of Ecobank Group
- First Bank Gambia Limited, part of First Bank of Nigeria Group
- Guaranty Trust Bank (Gambia) Limited, part of GTCO Group
- Mega Bank (Gambia) Limited (formerly Keystone Bank), state-owned
- Standard Chartered Bank (Gambia) Limited, part of Standard Chartered Group
- Trust Bank Limited
- Vista Bank (Gambia) Limited, part of Vista Bank Group
- Zenith Bank Gambia Limited, part of Zenith Bank Group

== See also ==
- List of banks in Africa
- Central Bank of The Gambia
- List of companies based in The Gambia
