= Air Charter Africa =

IATA	ICAO	Call sign
-	ACE	-
- Founded: 2007
- Ceased operations: 2009
- Hubs: Banjul International Airport
- Fleet size: 1
- Headquarters: Banjul, Gambia
- Website: http://www.aircharterafrica.org/

Air Charter Africa was a charter airline based in Banjul, Gambia established as Air Charter Express in 2007 and shortly renamed.

== Fleet ==
The Air Charter Africa includes the following aircraft (as of 21 December 2008):

- 1 Boeing 737-200 (which is operated by Star Air Cargo)

== See also ==
- List of defunct airlines of the Gambia
- Transport in the Gambia
