= FlyDamas =

Syrian private airline

| IATA | ICAO | Call sign |
|---|---|---|
| 4J | FDK | DAMAVIA |
- Founded: 2013; 13 years ago
- Commenced operations: 10 December 2015
- Ceased operations: 30 January 2018
- Operating bases: Damascus International Airport
- Fleet size: 2
- Destinations: 7
- Key people: Ammar Al-Kadri, owner
- Website: www.flydamas.com

FlyDamas Airlines (Arabic: فلاي داماس) was a private Syrian airline based at Damascus International Airport from 2015 to 2018. The airline operated a single Boeing 737-300 aircraft and had scheduled flights to Iraq, Kuwait, Syria and Sudan. The airline ceased operations on 30 January 2018.

== History ==
FlyDamas had planned to launch flights on 1 April and 1 November 2015; however, this did not occur. The airline operated its first flight on 10 December 2015 between Damascus and Qamishli. Although it was planning flights to many destinations, FlyDamas initially only operated flights to Qamishli. For this reason, the airline may be affiliated with the Syrian government and may have been transporting supplies to the city for the Syrian Army.

FlyDamas began flights to various countries in the Middle East and Africa, using a Boeing 737-500 leased from Alexandria Airlines. However, in November 2016, the airline acquired its own Boeing 737-300. In August 2017, FlyDamas began to lease a freighter Boeing 737-400 from Mid Africa Aviation for dedicated cargo.

The airline ceased operations on 30 January 2018.

== Corporate affairs ==
FlyDamas was owned by Ammar A-Kadri and managed by Samer Al-Dehni, former commercial director of Cham Wings Airlines. He says the goal of FlyDamas was to lend support to its "mother company", Syrian Air, which is under sanctions amid the Syrian Civil War.

== Destinations ==
FlyDamas operated to the following destinations in November 2016:

| ^{[Base]} | Base |

| City | Country | IATA | ICAO | Airport |
|---|---|---|---|---|
| Baghdad | Iraq | BGW | ORBI | Baghdad International Airport |
| Basra | Iraq | BSR | ORMM | Basra International Airport |
| Damascus | Syria | DAM | OSDI | Damascus International Airport^{[Base]} |
| Khartoum | Sudan | KRT | HSSS | Khartoum International Airport |
| Kuwait City | Kuwait | KWI | OKBK | Kuwait International Airport |
| Najaf | Iraq | NJF | ORNI | Al Najaf International Airport |
| Qamishli | Syria | KAC | OSKL | Qamishli Airport |

== Fleet ==
The FlyDamas fleet consists of the following aircraft as of August 2017:

FlyDamas fleet
| Aircraft | In fleet | Notes |
|---|---|---|
| Boeing 737-300 | 1 | Acquired in November 2016 |

FlyDamas has also operated the following aircraft:

FlyDamas historic fleet
| Aircraft | Total | Notes |
|---|---|---|
| Boeing 737-500 | 1 | Leased from Mid Africa Aviation |
| Boeing 737-400F | 1 | Wet leased from Mid Africa Aviation |

== See also ==
- List of airlines of Syria
