= Gambia Bird =

| IATA | ICAO | Call sign |
|---|---|---|
| 3G | GBQ | GAMBIA BIRD |
- Commenced operations: 22 October 2012
- Ceased operations: 2014
- Hubs: Banjul International Airport
- Fleet size: 2
- Destinations: 9
- Parent company: Germania
- Headquarters: Kanifing, The Gambia
- Key people: Thomas Wazinski, CEO
- Website: www.gambiabird.com

Gambia Bird Airlines Limited was the flag carrier airline of Gambia headquartered in Kanifing with its home base at Banjul International Airport. It suspended operations in December 2014.

== History ==
Gambia Bird was founded by the German carrier Germania in October 2012. The airline was launched in partnership with the Government of Gambia in order to replace the services of Air Afrique, which was liquidated in 2002. Germania retained a 90% ownership share of Gambia Bird.

The carrier started operations on 22 October 2012 with an Airbus A319-100 leased from Germania that flew between Banjul and Dakar. Accra, Conakry, Freetown and Monrovia were added to the route network shortly afterwards; on 24 October 2012, Gambia Bird operated its first service to London Gatwick. Flights to Barcelona were introduced on 28 October. A second A319 joined the fleet in November 2012.

In December 2014, Gambia Bird suspended operations until further notice. By May 2015, there had not been any resumption of services. The former aircraft of Gambia Bird were taken back into service with its parent, Germania. In March 2015, Germania's CEO stated that a resumption of services by Gambia Bird was unlikely, due to an insufficient perspective for future development.

== Destinations ==
Gambia Bird served the following destinations, as of June 2014:

| Country | City | Airport | Start | End | Refs |
|---|---|---|---|---|---|
| Cameroon | Douala | Douala International Airport | Unknown | Unknown | |
| Gambia | Banjul | Banjul International Airport ^{Hub} | —N/a | December 2014 | |
| Ghana | Accra | Accra International Airport | 2012 | December 2014 | |
| Guinea-Bissau | Bissau | Osvaldo Vieira International Airport | Unknown | December 2014 | |
| Guinea | Conakry | Conakry International Airport | Unknown | Unknown | |
| Liberia | Monrovia | Roberts International Airport | 2012 | December 2014 | |
| Nigeria | Lagos | Murtala Muhammed International Airport | Unknown | December 2014 | |
| Senegal | Dakar | Léopold Sédar Senghor International Airport | 22 October 2012 | December 2014 | |
| Sierra Leone | Freetown | Lungi International Airport | 2012 | December 2014 | |
| Spain | Barcelona | Barcelona Airport | 28 October 2012 | December 2014 | |
| United Kingdom | London | Gatwick Airport | 24 October 2012 | December 2014 | |

== Fleet ==
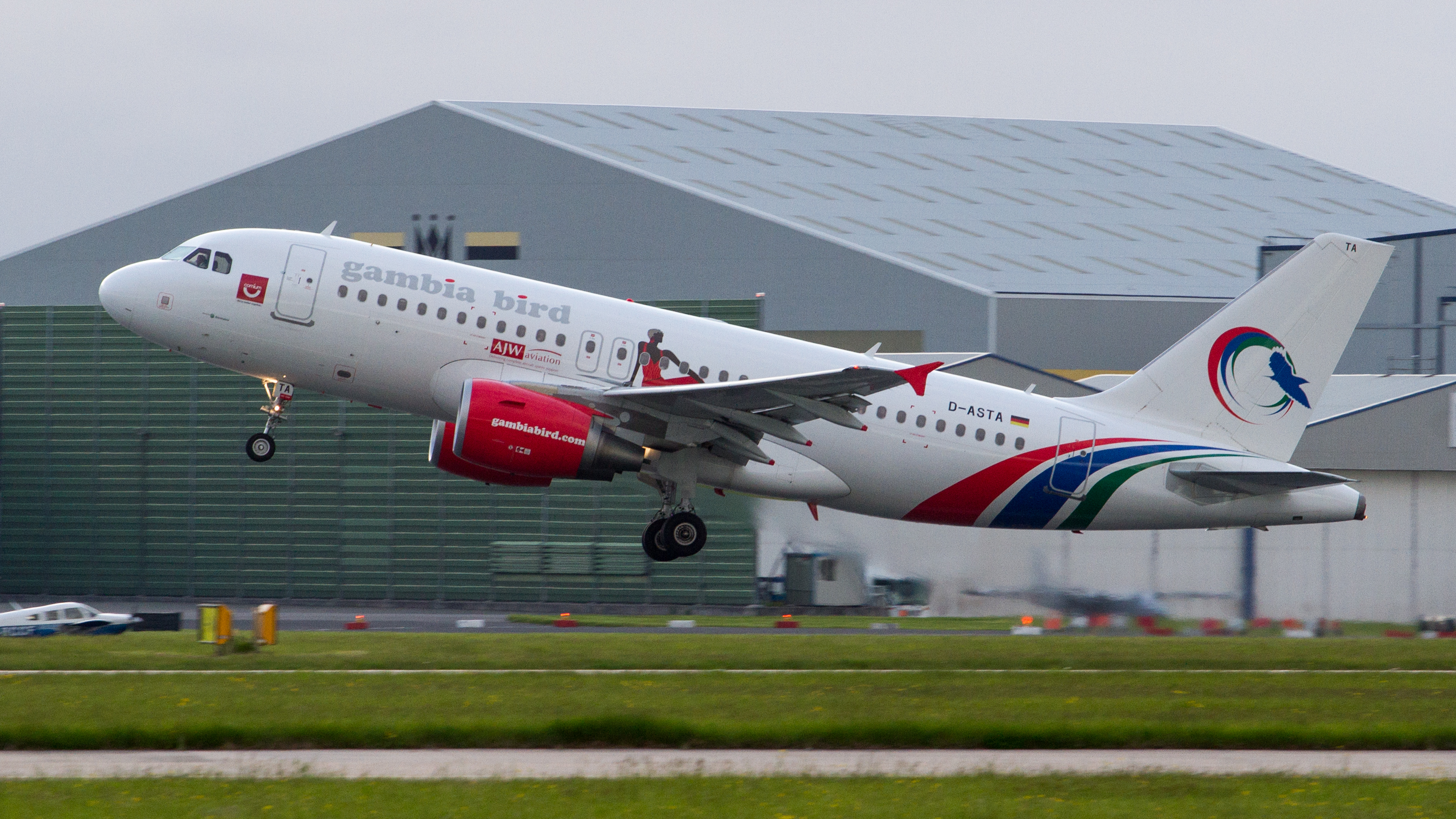
Gambia Bird Airbus A319-100

As of December 2014, the Gambia Bird fleet consisted of the following aircraft:

Gambia Bird fleet
| Aircraft | In fleet | Passengers | Notes |
|---|---|---|---|
| Airbus A319-100 | 2 | 144 | Leased from Germania |

== See also ==
- List of defunct airlines of the Gambia
- Transport in the Gambia
