= New Millennium Air =

Gambian airline

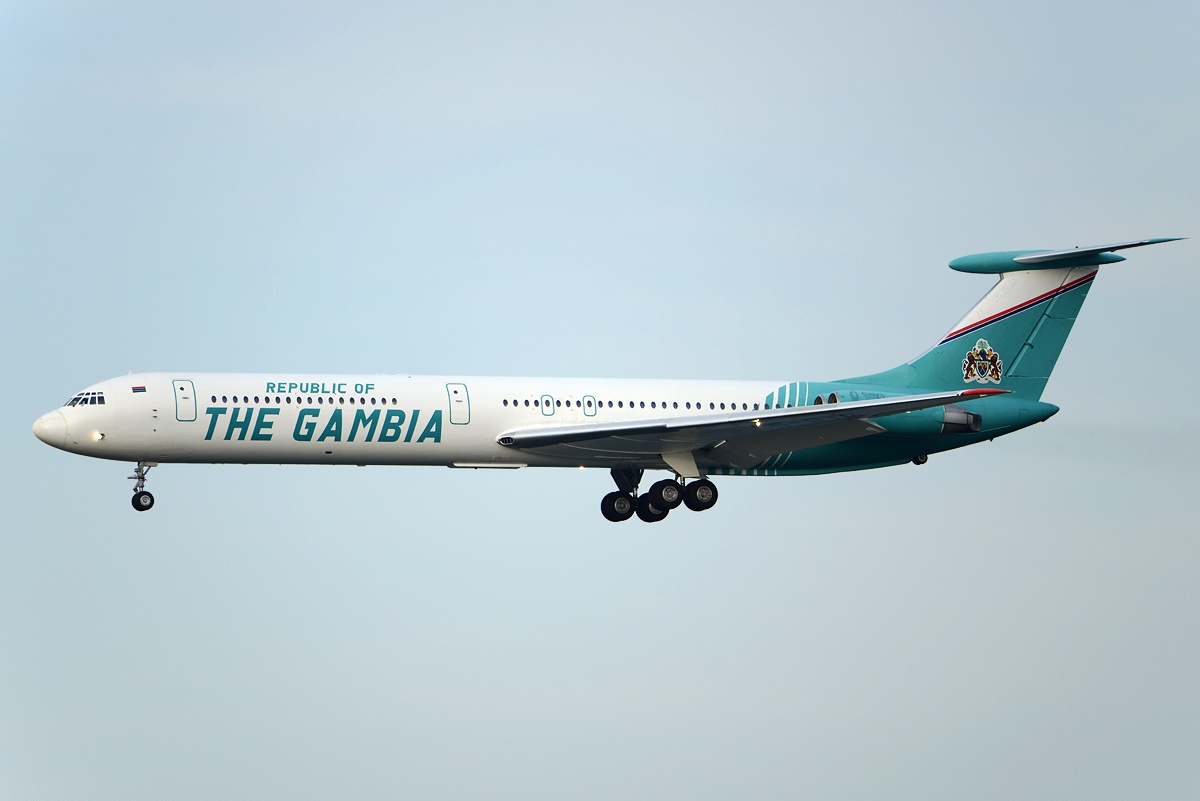
- C5-GNM approaching to Tokyo-Haneda Int'l Airport.
IATA	ICAO	Call sign
—	NML	NEWMILL
- Founded: 1999
- Ceased operations: 2002
- Hubs: Banjul
- Fleet size: 1
- Destinations: Africa, Middle East
- Headquarters: Banjul

The Gambia New Millennium Air Company (also: Gambia Millennium Airline) was a Gambian airline based in Banjul.

== History ==
New Millennium Air began operations in 1999. Its director was Baba Jobe, who competed in the parliamentary elections in 1997, but could not win over the constituency of Jarra West. In connection with UNSCR 1343, Jobe was banned from traveling and his assets were frozen. He was accused of arms trafficking and links with the Liberian blood diamond trade. The New Millennium Air was also affected by the ban. The company was founded on behalf of Victor Bout. Their only Russian-built machine was acquired by Centrafrican Airlines. Later, the machine was used by the government.

== Destinations ==
New Millennium Air's only destinations were in West Africa and Saudi Arabia.

== Fleet ==
1 Ilyushin Il-62M (C5-GNM).

== See also ==
- List of defunct airlines of the Gambia
- Transport in the Gambia
