= Gambia Airways =

National Airline of the Gambia (1964–1996)

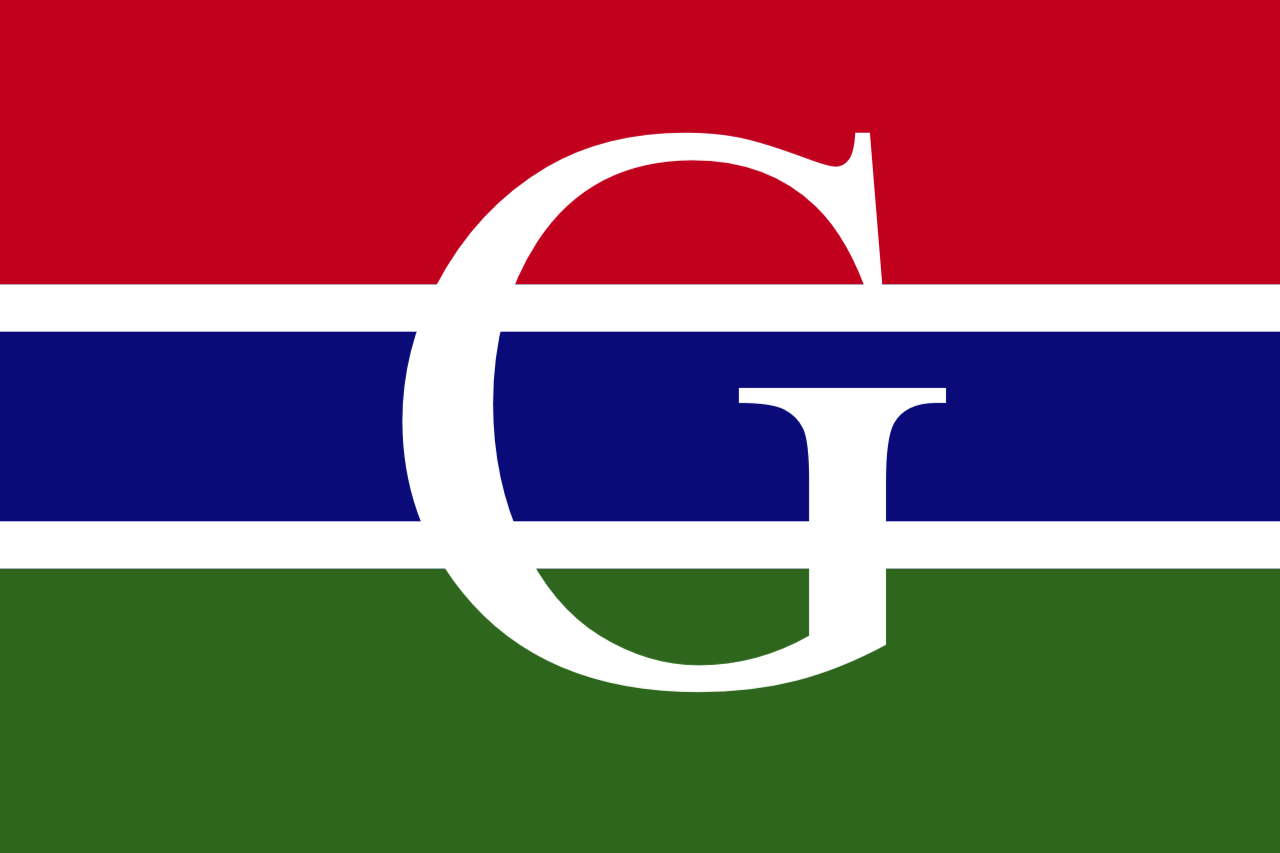

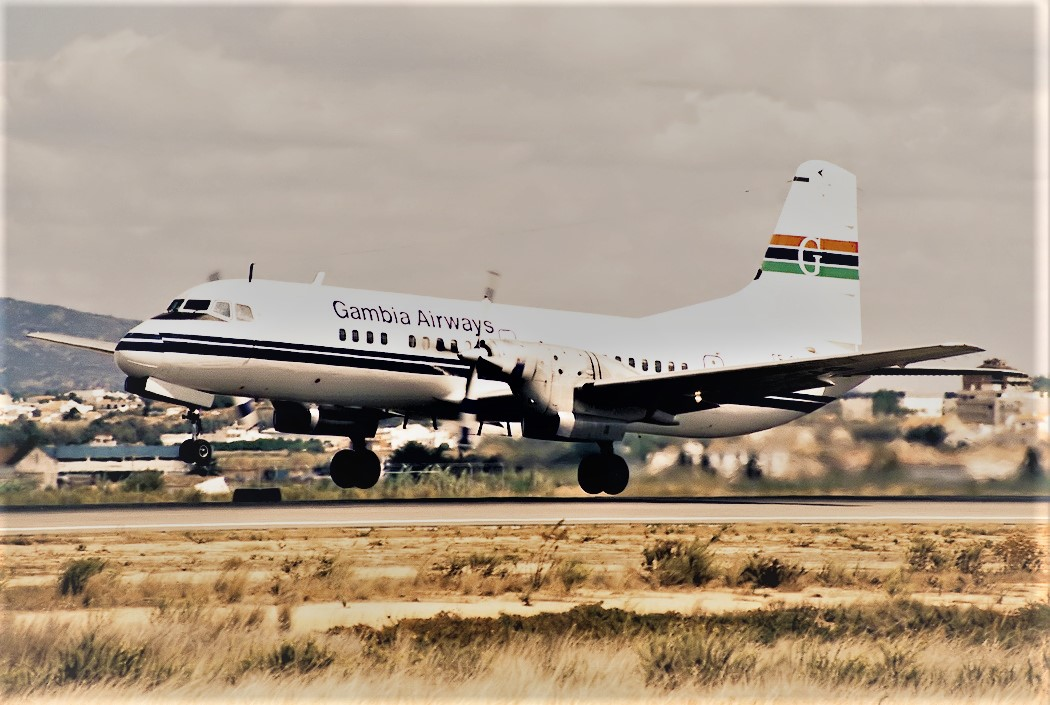
IATA	ICAO	Call sign
CK	GAW	GEELINE
- Founded: 1964
- Ceased operations: 1996
- Hubs: Banjul Airport
- Fleet size: 4
- Parent company: British Airways, Government of The Gambia
- Key people: Freddie Laker

Gambia Airways was the Gambian flag carrier based out of Gambia's Banjul Airport. Founded in 1964, its activities were later taken over by Gambia International Airlines after it ceased operations in 1996. It often operated at a loss, due to being created for national pride rather than on good business judgement. The airline also was a British Caledonian partner.

== History ==
Gambia Airways formed in December 1964 as the first joint venture between British United Airways and the government of The Gambia. Airlines were at the time in Africa symbols of independence rather than corporations. In 1964 Fredrick Alfred Laker was the chairman of Gambia Airways who would hold that position for 53 weeks, later in 1965 the airline was reorganized for the Gambian Government to hold 60% of the airline.

Vickers Viscounts were in the fleet at the time for the services to London and to other west African routes, they would charter out aircraft from British United Airways during the early days of their operations.

The airline initially would start operations as a ground handling operation before it would start flight operations, at least according to the plan. Independent flight operations would only however commence operations in 1990.

Gambia Airways was also tasked with improving Hajj charter flights out of the Gambia, which was a growing market at the time.

The airline also in the 1960s was managing local hotels and would employ 130 people which the airline initially started out with only four employees.

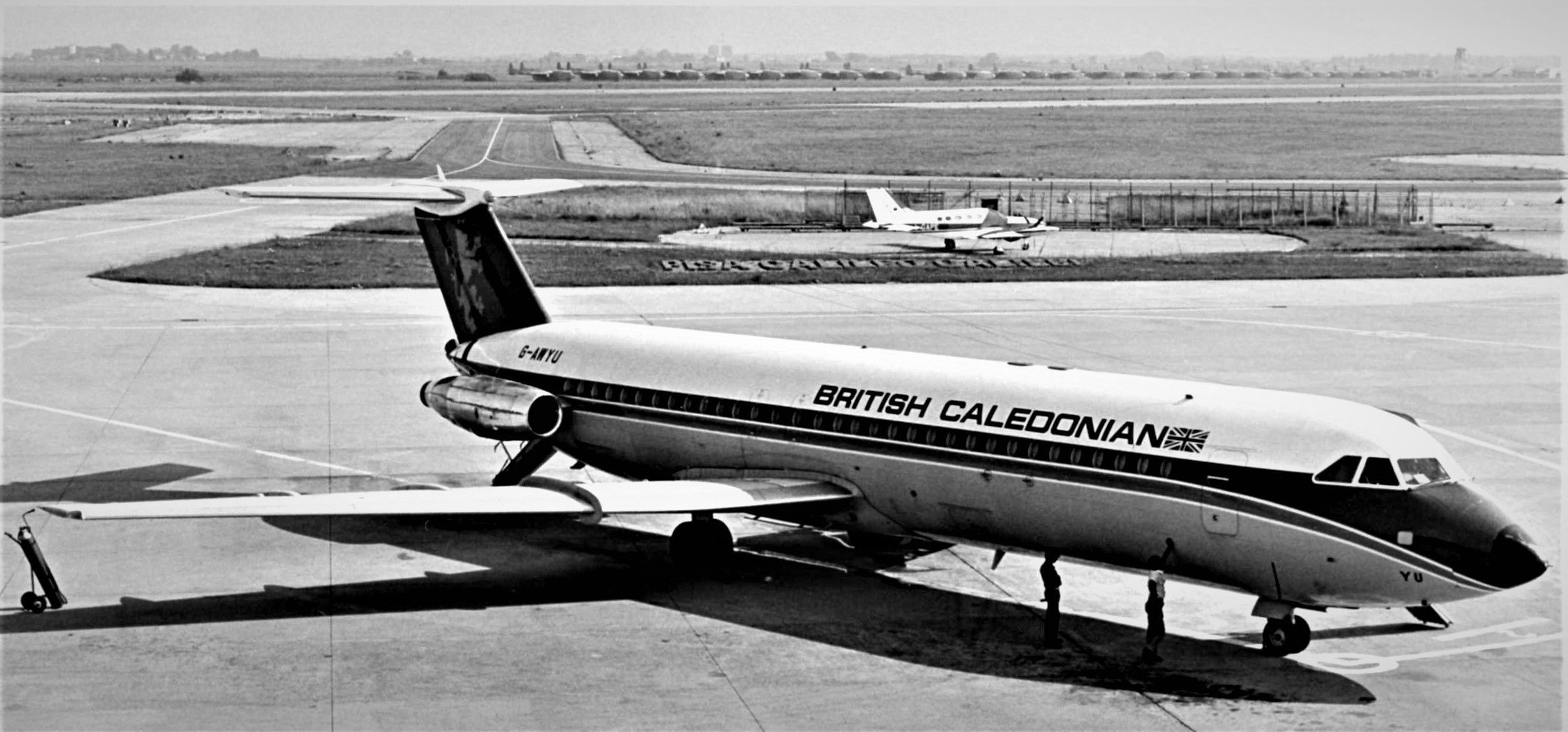
G-AWYU was one of the West African charters

The airline had a short intermission with the BAC 1-11 which were later replaced by the Boeing 707 in 1979. In the year 1970 the company British Caledonian had bought Gambia Airways shares, along with Sierra Leone Airways. In 1971 the BAC 1-11s utilized by GAW included the BAC 1-11 registered as G-AWYU.

In the 1974 British Politician Raymond Dobson was among the managers of Gambia Airways, Raymond would stay on the board of the airline until 1977.

In 1983 the airline's post box was located at Wellington Street PO BOX 268 and at the time it was a ground handling company. Managing the airline was R. Harfitt.

On November 1, 1987, its old flight code indicator GAW was replaced with GW (later to CK) for identifying flights. On December 14, 1990, it leased a Boeing 707 from Omega Air which was returned on April 4, 1991, also that same year the airline purchased a NAMC YS-11 marking the first aircraft Gambia Airways owned and branded under its own name.

This was one of the most pivotal achievements in the history of the airline as before then it would only operate ground handling and chartered aircraft with other airlines.

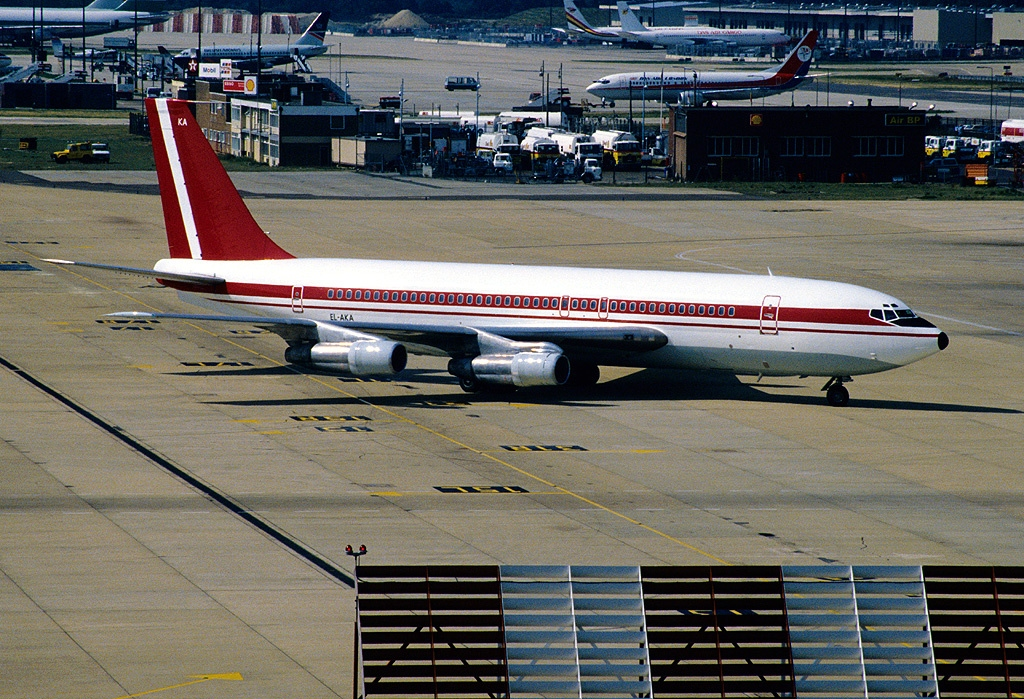
A Boeing 707 that was operated by Gambia Airways

In 1993 the airline operated a fleet of 2 NAMC YS 11s. When Air Gambia lost its permit to fly to London, Gambia Airways took over the route with an aircraft leased from Ethiopia. The route to London however was dropped in 1993 along with British Airways due to political reasons. British tourists could also book a charter to Dakar via Gambia Airways during this time. In 1994 the airline was suggested for the Financial Times 1994 edition for airline of the year. The airline in 1996 was flying 3 flights a week, but it was reported that the airline hadn't flown in 10 days. The airline owned a total of 3 NAMC YS-11s.

In 2017 the Fatu Network expressed the need to revive the former airline, although they did not prove much logical points for said revival other than prestige. The network also expressed discontent with the GCAA and how it needed to regrow the airline industry better. Suggestions for destinations included Banjul to London and New York.

== Fleet ==
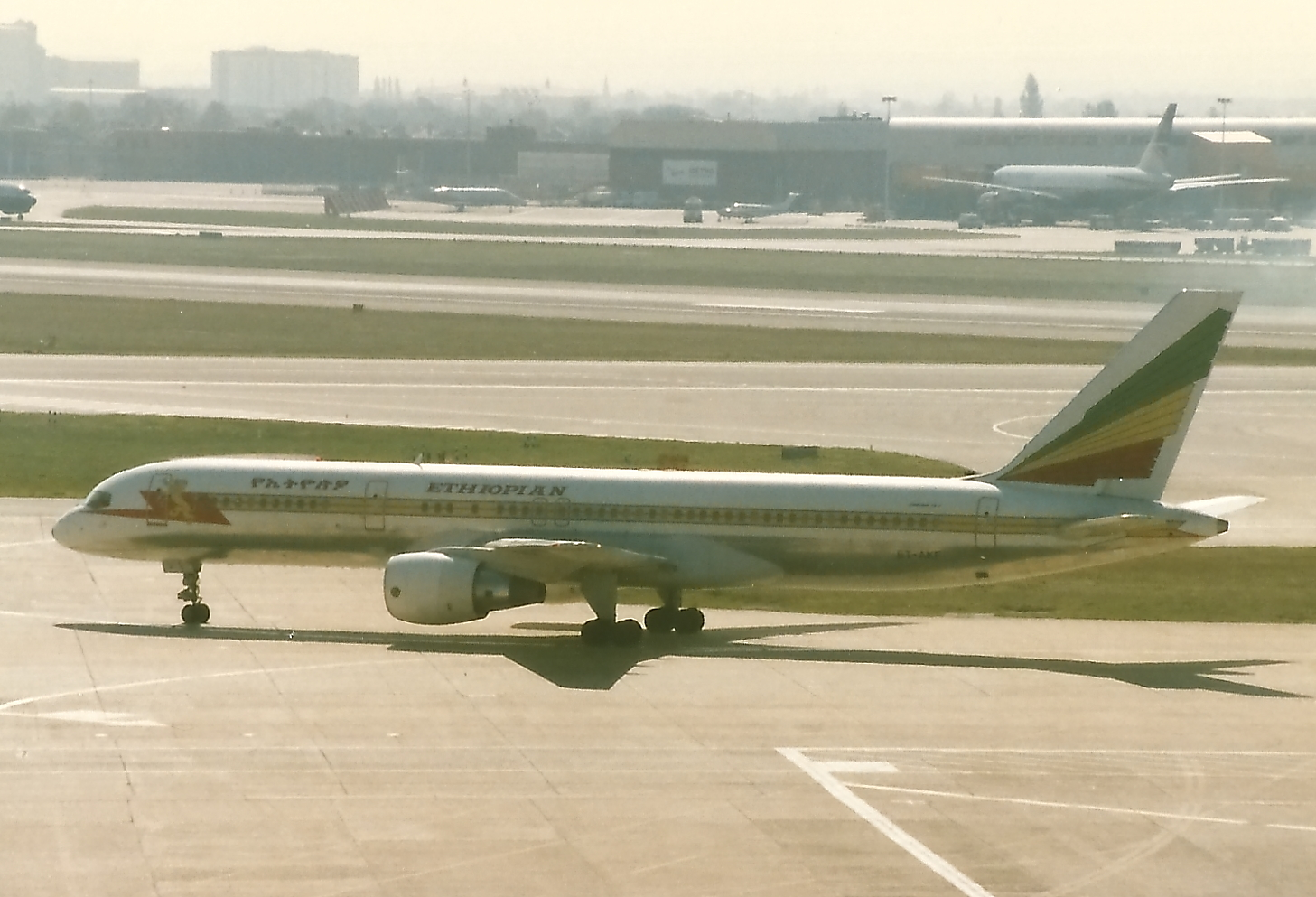
An aircraft similar to the aircraft used on the Banjul-London service

This is a list of aircraft operated by Gambia Airways over the years

- 5x NAMC YS-11 (2 leased from Air Aruba)
- 1x Boeing 707
- one Boeing 757 operated by Ethiopian Airlines
- BAC 1-11
- Vickers Viscount
- DC 8-55

== Destinations ==
As of 1991
Country	City	Notes
Cape Verde	Praia	
The Gambia	Banjul	Hub
Guinea	Conakry	
Guinea Bissau	Bissau	
Mauritania	Nouakchott	
Senegal	Dakar	
Sierra Leone	Freetown	

== Incidents ==
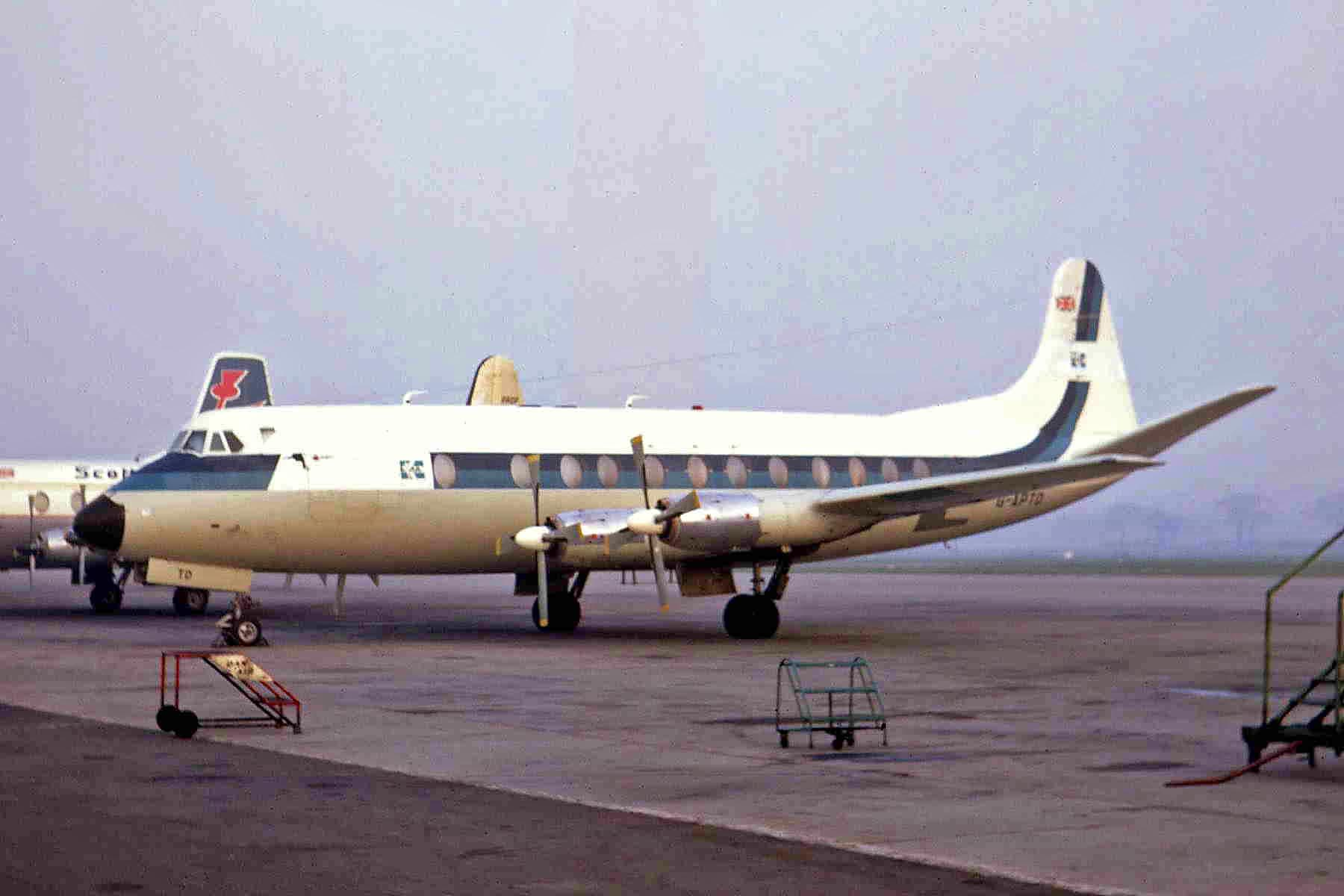
The aircraft involved in the 1965 accident

In March 1965 a flight operated by BUA as flight 321 had all its engines seize at Bathurst, all 4 engines cut off and the takeoff was aborted. After 16 days the aircraft flew again as the damage done to the aircraft was minor.

On December 9, 1993, a Gambia Airways NAMC YS-11 flying on the Dakar-Banjul route collided midair with a DHC-6, killing all 3 occupants on the DHC-6. All 38 occupants on the NAMC YS-11 survived.

== See also ==
- List of defunct airlines of the Gambia
