= List of airlines of The Gambia =

This is a list of airlines of the Gambia.

== Defunct ==
This is a list of now defunct airlines from Gambia.

Airline	Image	IATA	ICAO	Callsign	Commenced operations	Ceased operations	Notes
Afrinat International Airlines		Q9	AFN	AFRINAT	2002	2004	
Air Charter Africa			ACE		2007	2009	Established as Air Charter Express
Air Charter Express			ACE		2007	2007	Renamed to Air Charter Africa
Air Dabia		YM	DBG		1996	1998	
Air Gambia		IV	AGS	ATLAS	1990	1994	Operated Boeing 707, Ilyushin Il-62
Atlantic Express			JLM	ATLANTIC GAMBIA	2004	2006	
Gambcrest Enterprises						1992	Sole airframe destroyed in accident
Gambia Airways		CK	GAW	GEELINE	1964	1996	Operated NAMC YS-11
Gambia Bird Airlines		3G	GBQ	GAMBIA BIRD	2012	2014	
Gambia International Airlines		GC	GNR	GAMBIA INTERNATIONAL	1996	2007	ceased independent flight ops in 2007, exists as ground handling company
Gambia New Millenium Air			NML	NEWMILL	1999	2002	Sanctioned
Mid Africa Aviation			MFG		2011	2019	
Slok Air Gambia		SO	OKS		2004	2008	Established as Slok Air International
Slok Air International		S0	OKS	SLOK GAMBIA	1996	2004	Reformed as Slok Air Gambia
Slok Air International		SO	OKS		2008	2014	Renamed from Slok Air Gambia
West African Airways Corporation					1946	1958	

== See also ==
List of airlines of Africa
