= GCAA =

GCAA may refer to:

- Gambia Civil Aviation Authority
- Georgia Collegiate Athletic Association
- General Civil Aviation Authority, United Arab Emirates
- Ghana Civil Aviation Authority
- Golf Coaches Association of America
- Gulf Coast Athletic Association
- Guyana Civil Aviation Authority
