= JLM =

JLM may refer to:

- Jerusalem, the largest city in Israel
  - Made in JLM, an Israeli non-profit organisation based in Jerusalem
- Jean-Luc Mélenchon, member (French: député) of the National Assembly of France, president of the France insoumise parliamentary group
- Jewish Labour Movement, a British socialist society
- Chinese University of Hong Kong, the suffix code commonly used to represent the "School of Journalism and Communication, CUHK"
- John Lennon Museum, a defunct museum in Saitama, Japan
- Atlantic Express (Gambia airline) (ICAO airline code: JLM)
- A Jailhouse Lawyer's Manual
- Johnny Lee Middleton, bass guitar player from Savatage and Trans-Siberian Orchestra
