= Trust Bank Limited (Gambia) =

Bank of the Gambia

Trust Bank PLC
- Company type: Public company
- Traded as: GSE: TBL
- Industry: Financial services
- Founded: July 3, 1997; 28 years ago
- Headquarters: 34 Ecowas Avenue; Banjul, the Gambia
- Number of locations: 18 Branches (2025)
- Key people: Franklin Hayford Chairman, Njilan Senghore Managing Director
- Products: Loans, Checking, Savings, Investments, Debit Cards
- Total assets: GMD12.8 billion (2024)
- Number of employees: 450+ (2025)
- Subsidiaries: Bayba Financial Services
- Website: trustbankgambia.com

Trust Bank PLC (Gambia), formally known as Trust Bank Ltd (TBL), but also referred to as Trust Bank (Gambia), is a private commercial bank in the Gambia. It is one of the twelve commercial banks licensed by the Central Bank of the Gambia, the national banking regulator.

== History ==
Trust Bank Limited was founded in 1997 by private investors, with the objective of offering banking services to local and International individuals and businesses in a timely, professional, courteous manner, in a profitable framework. At its inception, Trust Bank acquired the assets and liabilities of the defunct Meridian Biao (Gambia) Bank.

In 2002, the shares of stock of Trust Bank Gambia Limited were listed on the Ghana Stock Exchange (GHA), where they trade under the symbol: TBL.

== Overview ==
Trust bank is a medium-sized financial services provider in the Gambia. As of December 2013, the bank's total assets were valued at approximately US$121.4 million (GMD:4.75 billion), and its shareholders' equity exceeded US$11.3 million (GMD:440.2 million). The bank is one of the largest commercial banks in the Gambia, both by asset size and by branch network. As of December 2024, their total assets reached GMD12.8 billion, marking a 11.1% increase from the previous year. They also successfully upgraded their core banking system of Flexcube from lower version to the latest.

The bank has the following correspondent banks:

1. Ghana International Bank - London
2. Ghana Commercial Bank - Accra, Ghana
3. Unicredit Italiano - Milan, Italy
4. Skandinaviska - Stockholm
5. Zhejiang Chouzhou Commercial Bak - China
6. Ecobank Senegal - Dakar
7. Afexim Bank - Cairo, Egypt
8. Aktif Bank - Istanbul

== Ownership ==
The bank has over 1,000 shareholders with the largest shareholder being the Social Security and Housing Finance Corporation, (SSHFC) of the Gambia.

== Branch network ==
As of July 2025, the bank maintains branches at the following locations:

1. Head Office - 34 Ecowas Avenue, Banjul
2. Bakau Branch - Sait Matty Road, Bakau
3. Airport Branch - Banjul International Airport, Yundum
4. Bakoteh Branch - Tipper Garage, Bakoteh
5. Basse Santa-Su Branch - Upper River Region, Basse Santa Su
6. Brikama Branch - West Coast Region, Brikama
7. Farafenni Branch - North Bank Region, Farafenni
8. Kololi/Senegambia Branch - Wilmon Company Building, Bertil Harding Highway, Kololi
9. Latrikunda Branch - Sabiji, Serrekunda
10. Serrekunda Branch 2 - Sayerr Jobe Avenue, Saho Kunda, Serrekunda
11. Serrekunda Branch 3 - Westfield Junction, Serrekunda
12. Soma Branch - Lower River Region, Soma
13. Lamin Branch - Lamin Highway
14. Serrekunda Market - Serrekunda Mosque Road
15. Bundung - Bundung Highway
16. Brusubi Branch - Turntable Opposite Africmed Clinic
17. Sinchu Branch - Coastal Road at The Turntable
18. Barra Branch - Barra, North Bank Region

== See also ==
- List of banks in the Gambia
- Central Bank of the Gambia
