= Atlantic Express (airline) =

Gambian airline (2004-06)

Atlantic Express Airlines
IATA	ICAO	Call sign
—	JLM	ATLANTIC GAMBIA
- Founded: 2004
- Commenced operations: December 16, 2004
- Ceased operations: 2006
- Hubs: Banjul International Airport
- Secondary hubs: Lagos International Airport
- Fleet size: 1
- Parent company: Ritetime Group
- Headquarters: Banjul, Gambia

Atlantic Express (ICAO: JLM) was an airline operating in Gambia, a country in West Africa. The airline began services on December 16, 2004, from Banjul International Airport in Banjul to Lagos International Airport in Lagos, Nigeria.

== History ==
The airline was founded in 2004 and started its operations on December 16, 2004.

In March 2005, Acvila Air leased an McDonnell Douglas MD-82 to Atlantic Express Airlines. The aircraft returned to Acvila Air in May 2006.

== Destinations ==
Atlantic Express Airlines flew to the following destinations:

- Dakar
- Freetown
- Accra
- Lagos
- Conakry
- Monrovia
- Abidjan
- Douala
- Cotonou
- Brazzaville
- Libreville
- Praia
- Ouagadougou

Atlantic Express Airlines also flew to Europe and the United States.

== Fleet ==
The fleet of Atlantic Express consisted of the following aircraft:

Atlantic Express Airline Gambia Fleet
Aircraft	Total	Notes
McDonnell Douglas MD-82	1	

The airline operated Douglas DC-9-32 aircraft, some of which ended up parked at Phoenix Goodyear Airport in 2008.

== See also ==
- List of defunct airlines of the Gambia
- Transport in the Gambia
