= Varig Flight 837 =

1967 aviation accident

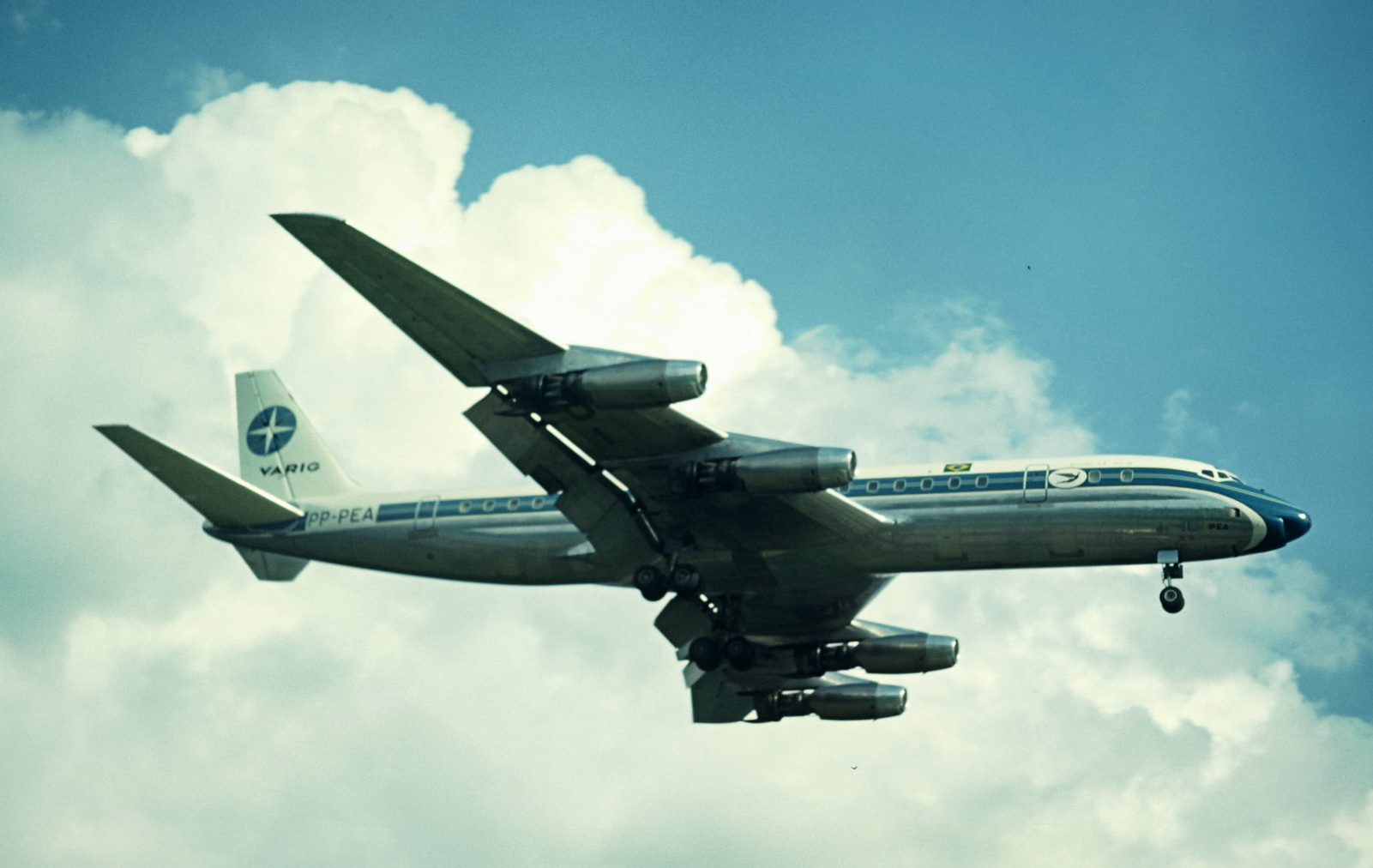
- PP-PEA, the aircraft involved in the accident, seen in 1966

Accident
- Date: 5 March 1967
- Summary: Controlled flight into terrain caused by pilot error
- Site: Roberts International Airport, Harbel, Liberia; 6.207°N 10.37897°W
- Total fatalities: 56

Aircraft
- Aircraft type: Douglas DC-8-33
- Operator: Varig
- Registration: PP-PEA
- Flight origin: Beirut International Airport, Beirut, Lebanon
- 1st stopover: Fiumicino Airport, Rome, Italy
- 2nd stopover: Roberts International Airport, Monrovia, Liberia
- Destination: Galeão International Airport, Rio de Janeiro, Brazil
- Passengers: 71
- Crew: 19
- Fatalities: 51
- Survivors: 39

Ground casualties
- Ground fatalities: 5

Varig Flight 837 was a flight from Fiumicino Airport, Rome, Italy to Galeão International Airport, Rio de Janeiro, Brazil, originating in Beirut, Lebanon, and with a stop in Monrovia, Liberia. On 5 March 1967, due to pilot error, the flight crashed during approach to Runway 04 of Roberts International Airport. Of the 71 passengers and 19 crew on board, 50 passengers and the flight engineer perished. In addition, 5 people on the ground were also killed. The aircraft caught fire and was written off. This is the worst aviation accident in Liberia to this day.

== Investigation ==
Investigators determined the probable cause of the crash to be "The failure of the pilot-in-command to arrest in time the fast descent at a low altitude upon which he had erroneously decided, instead of executing a missed approach when he found himself too high over the locator beacon."
