= Roberts International Airport =

Commercial airport near Monrovia, Liberia

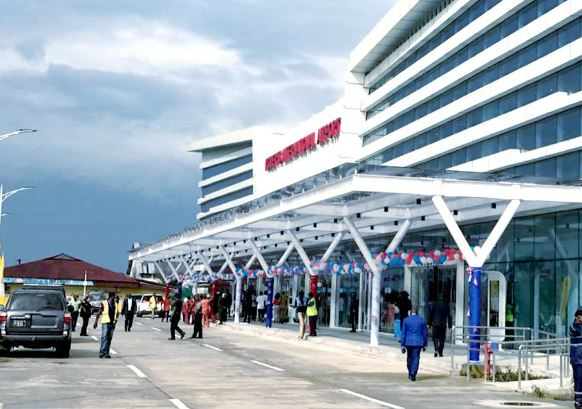
- IATA: ROB; ICAO: GLRB

Summary
- Airport type: Public
- Serves: Monrovia, Liberia
- Elevation AMSL: 31 ft (9.4 m)
- Coordinates: 06°14′02″N 010°21′44″W

Map
- Location in Liberia

Runways
Direction	Length		Surface
Direction	ft	m	Surface
04/22	11,000	3,353	Asphalt

Statistics (2009)
- Passengers: 133,656
- Source: DAFIF

Roberts International Airport (IATA: ROB, ICAO: GLRB), informally also known as Robertsfield, is an international airport in Liberia. Located near the town of Harbel in Margibi County, the single runway airport is about 35 miles (56 km) outside of the nation's capital of Monrovia, and as an origin and destination point is referred to as "Monrovia". Locally, it is often referred to as simply "RIA." The airport is named in honor of Joseph Jenkins Roberts, the first President of Liberia.

The airport is the nation's busiest and most important aviation facility, currently hosting the country's only scheduled commercial airline services, with direct connections to several major cities in West Africa as well as flights to Europe on Brussels Airlines. The airport reportedly served 228,000 passengers annually in 2018 and recently underwent a major expansion, including the opening of a new passenger terminal. The facility with its 11,000 feet (3,353 m) long runway was an emergency landing site for the United States' Space Shuttle program and is one of only two with paved runways in the country. While Monrovia's secondary airport, Spriggs Payne Airport, is much closer to the city center and possesses the nation's only other paved runway, it has not had scheduled commercial international service since ASKY Airlines suspended service in November 2014.

== History ==
=== Early years ===
In 1942, Liberia signed a Defense Pact with the United States. This commenced a period of strategic road building and other construction related to US military interests in checking the expansion of the Axis powers. The airport was originally built by the U.S. government as an Air Force base as part of these activities. The runway was built long enough for B-47 Stratojet bombers to land for refueling, giving Liberia what was for many years the longest runway in Africa. U.S. President Franklin D. Roosevelt had lunch with President Edwin J. Barclay at Roberts Field during his visit to Liberia in January 1943.

From 1943 to the end of World War II in 1945, Roberts Field Airport, as it was then known, served as an alternative base for a contingent of 26 Squadron SAAF which flew Vickers Wellington bombers on anti-submarine (U-Boat) and convoy escort patrols over the Atlantic. Their main base was at Takoradi, in the Gold Coast.

=== Pre-war commercial era ===
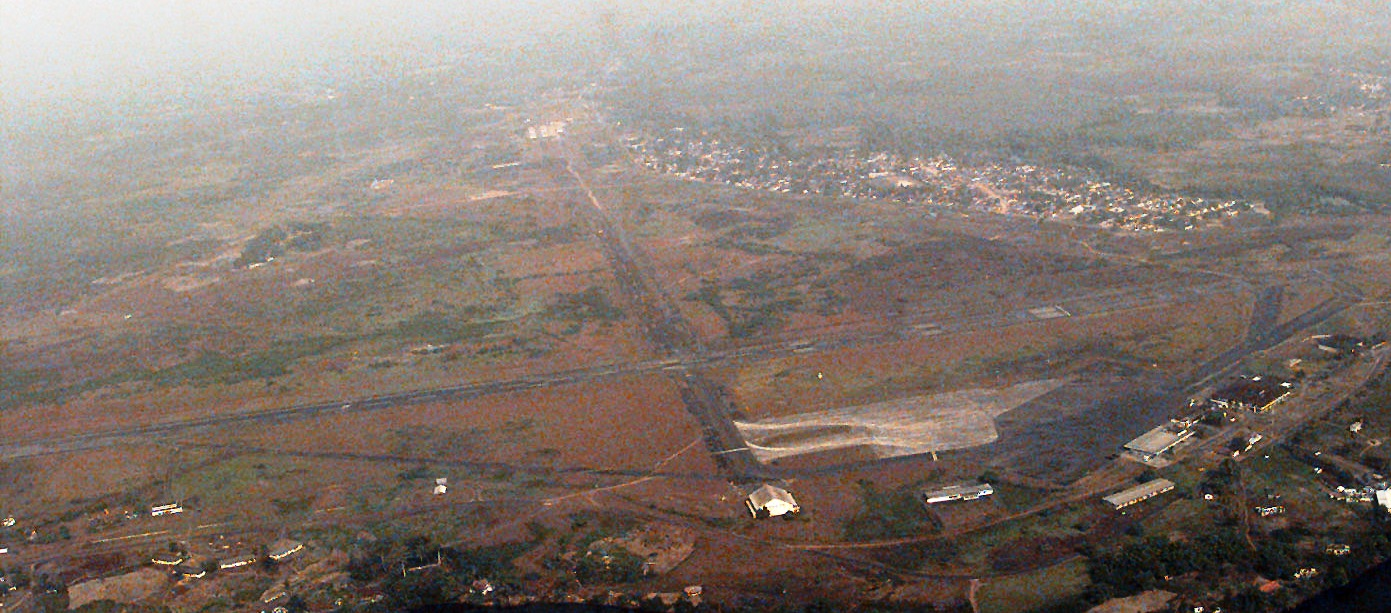
An aerial view of the airport in 1997

The story of Roberts Field is consistently intertwined with the history of Pan American World Airways. In fact, from the end of World War II until 1985, the airport was administered and operated by Pan American under contract with the Republic of Liberia's Ministry of Transport. Monrovia was consistently a key link in Pan American's African network, usually an intermediate stop between Accra and Dakar, from which service continued onward to Europe and New York.

In the late 1970s and into the early 1980s, the airport became Pan Am's principal African hub, with a nonstop Boeing 747 service from New York JFK connecting at Robertsfield to such destinations as Dakar, Accra, Abidjan, Lagos, and Conakry, among others, and continuing on to Nairobi and even at times Johannesburg, so that for many years virtually every Pan Am passenger to Africa passed through Robertsfield. Pan Am's presence diminished during the 1980s, as Pan Am's African network was slowly pulled down. Pan Am ended its management of the airport in 1985 but as late as 1986 the airport was still a stop on the JFK-Dakar-Monrovia-Lagos-Nairobi route. By 1987, Pan Am was no longer serving Monrovia at all.

A number of European airlines also served the airport from the mid-1960s to the mid-1980s, including British Caledonian Airways with Boeing 707s, KLM Royal Dutch Airlines with Douglas DC-8s and Sabena, Swissair and UTA with these three air carriers all operating McDonnell Douglas DC-10s into Robertsfield. Scandinavian Airline System also served Monrovia, from Copenhagen. In the mid-1970s this service consisted of a weekly flight via Düsseldorf and Madrid and a second weekly flight via Zürich, then onward to South America: Rio de Janeiro, Montevideo, and Santiago de Chile.

Similarly, VARIG employed RIA as a stop on its flights between Brazil and Europe, which began in the mid-1960s and lasted at least until the mid-1970s, with various routings including Rio de Janeiro-Monrovia-Rome and Rio-Monrovia-Madrid-Rome. VARIG's Flight between Rome and Rio crashed at Monrovia in March 1967, and remains the worst aviation accident in Liberia to this day.

As with Pan Am, several African flag carriers utilized Robertsfield as a waystation on transatlantic routes. As early as 1966, Nigeria Airways began a codeshare cooperation on Pan Am's flights to New York-JFK from Lagos via Monrovia, and in later decades Monrovia remained a stop on its weekly services to New York, at most times utilizing its own McDonnell Douglas DC-10. This also included for a time a weekly Monrovia-Port of Spain-Miami flight. Until 1983, Air Afrique's DC-10s also stopped at Robertsfield on that airline's Abidjan-Monrovia-Dakar-New York services. In April 1988, Zambia Airways commenced service from Lusaka to New York via Monrovia.

In the past, Roberts Airport was listed as an alternative landing site for NASA's Space Shuttle.

=== Post-war redevelopment ===
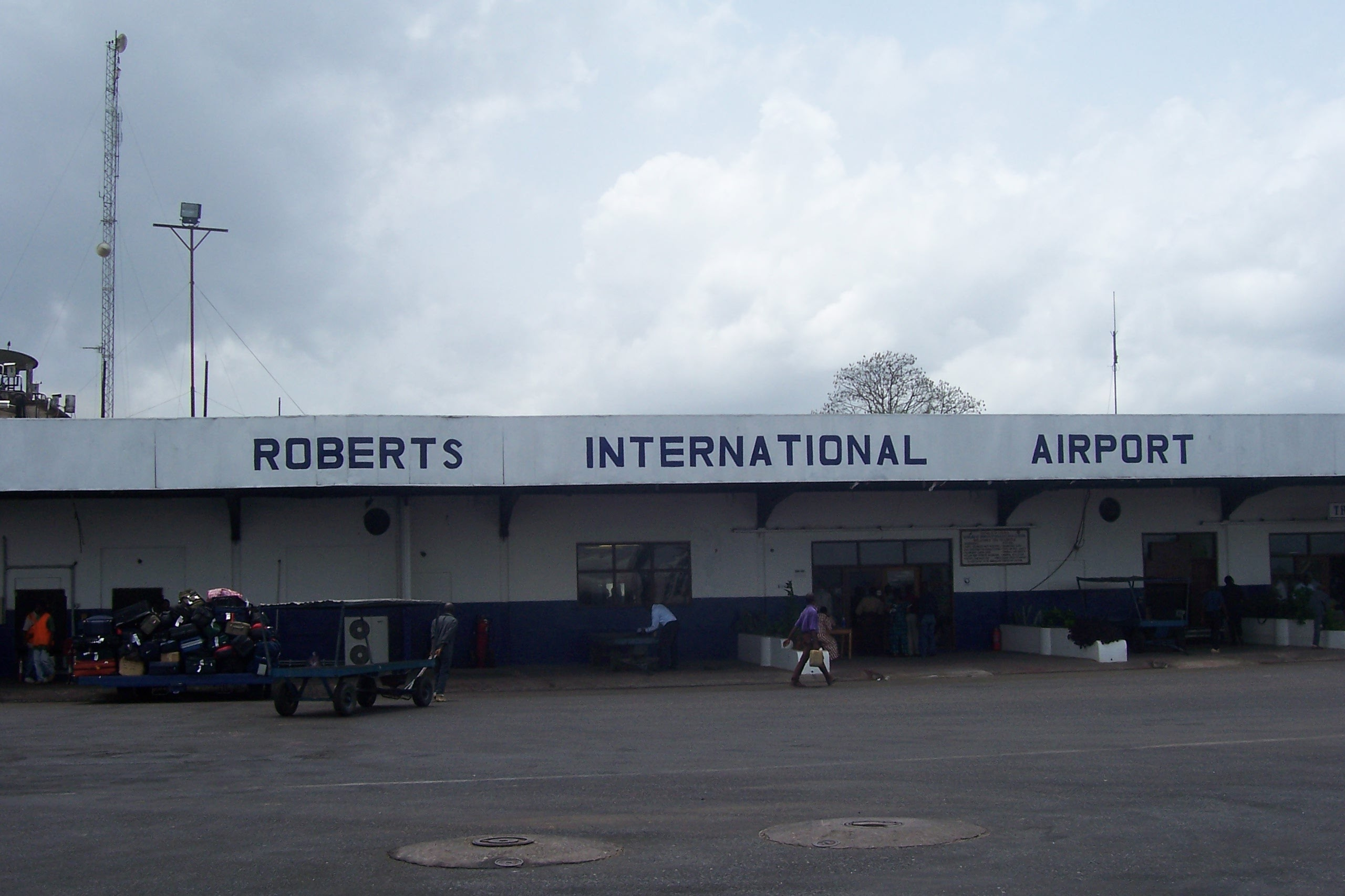
The passenger terminal at Roberts International Airport in 2006.

During the Second Liberian Civil War, the main terminal building suffered major damage, and remains vacant and unenclosed. Currently, the terminal facilities consist of two passenger buildings, one for departures by most commercial carriers and all arrivals, and a second, Terminal B, opened in March 2012, and in its first two years was reserved exclusively for departures by Air France and Delta Air Lines. Other airside buildings are primarily used by the United Nations, with a VIP facility adjacent to the original, unused terminal.

After the end of the civil war in 2003, commercial air service was slow to return to Liberia, and only gathered momentum after the inauguration of President Ellen Johnson Sirleaf in January 2006. Royal Air Maroc started flights to Mohamed V International Airport in November 2007, and Virgin Nigeria added Monrovia to its network, from Lagos via Accra twice per week, in October 2008.

Also in October 2008 U.S. carrier Delta Air Lines announced that, as part of a major expansion of its route network in Africa, it would begin a once-weekly service between Atlanta and Monrovia, via Sal, Cape Verde. The proposed service would have commenced in June 2009, utilizing a Boeing 757-200 configured for ETOPS operations in a two-class configuration. The news marked the return of an American carrier and direct flights to the United States for the first time since Pan Am's withdrawal, and would make RIA one of only a handful of African airports with service to the US, so was therefore seen as a major step in the recovery of not just the airport, but Liberia itself. The route was revised in May to originate from New York's JFK and connect via Dakar, beginning on 9 June, Monday, and returning every Tuesday.

One week prior to the inaugural flight, Delta announced that its planned launch would be suspended indefinitely. It was reported widely that the carrier had been denied permission by the Transportation Security Administration due to a lack of acceptable security standards at Robertsfield. Neither Delta nor the TSA issued any further explanation. However, Cynthia B. Nash, a prominent Atlanta businesswoman, stated in an interview coinciding with her appointment as Liberia's Honorary Consul in August 2009 that she expected Roberts International to upgrade its security to meet TSA standards and for the Delta to launch the flight "within the year." Coinciding with these comments, it was reported in the Liberian press that a division of Lockheed Martin was to take over management of Robertsfield.

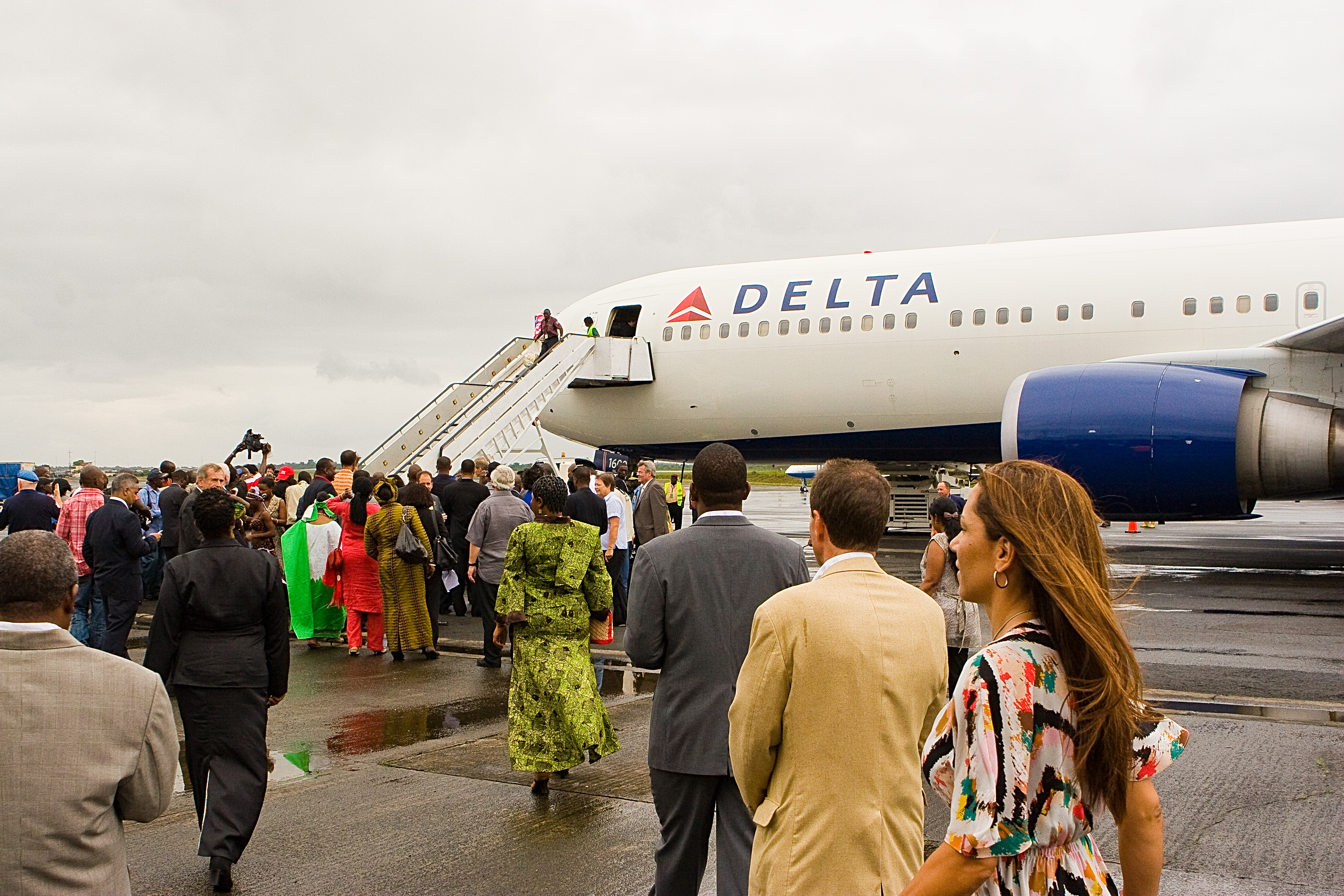
Delta Air Lines inaugural flight to Monrovia (5 September 2010)

On 5 September 2010, Delta launched once weekly flights between Atlanta and Monrovia; with a stop in Accra. In January 2011, Delta Air Lines increased flights to twice a week (Sundays and Wednesdays). By mid-2012, Delta operated a Boeing 767-300 thrice-weekly to and from New York-JFK, while maintaining the stop in Accra.

Daily commercial traffic peaked in this year, with one or two daily arrivals. The busiest and most frequent connection was to Accra, with four airlines providing at least one flight per day on the route, which for a time made it the third-busiest connection from Accra and one of the top 15 route pairs in West and Central Africa, although service on the route has diminished in 2012 with the end of Air Mali's unsuccessful Bamako-Monrovia-Accra service and the demise of Air Nigeria, which for several years had flown from Lagos to Monrovia via Accra five times per week.

In October 2012, start-up airline Gambia Bird commenced twice-weekly non-stop services between Banjul and Robertsfield with an Airbus A319. This service was later expanded to include multi-week flights to Accra and Freetown, and by mid-2014 Gambia Bird had offered the most destinations from Robertsfield of any airline, with same-plane service to Lagos, Douala and Dakar. Also in early 2014, Air Côte d'Ivoire added a service from Abidjan to Freetown via Roberts International.

=== Decline of service and effects of Ebola crisis ===
A decline in global prices for commodities such as gold, iron ore and oil began in 2013 and 2014, causing an immediate slowdown of Liberia's extractive-dependent economy, which in turn pressured the viability of the many new intercontinental services from Robertsfield. The first major blow to the airport's renaissance came in late June 2014, when Air France scrapped its flight to Liberia, citing lack of profitability.

An even bigger loss to the airport in terms of capacity, connectivity and prestige came when Delta Air Lines announced that, after nearly four years of service, it would cease flights to Monrovia on 31 August 2014 due to weak passenger demand.

Within the same month that the last Delta jet departed Liberia, most scheduled flights, including those of British Airways, Kenya Airways, Air Côte d'Ivoire, Arik Air, and Gambia Bird were suspended due to the rapidly-spreading Ebola outbreak. Royal Air Maroc and Brussels Airlines both remained flying through the crisis, albeit with reduced schedules. British Airways and Delta have not resumed service to Monrovia since that time.

Gambia Bird subsequently ceased operations entirely, in large part because of the downturn in air travel across West Africa due to Ebola. The first airline to return service to Robertsfield was Air Côte d'Ivoire, in October 2014. Kenya Airways returned thereafter, resuming its Nairobi-Accra-Monrovia flights in January 2015 after the Kenyan Ministry of Health lifted its restrictions. In September 2015, Brussels Airlines brought back more frequencies to its Monrovia service, doubling weekly flights from its twice-weekly low during the Ebola crisis back to four per week, similar to its pre-Ebola capacity.

=== Facility upgrade and expansion ===
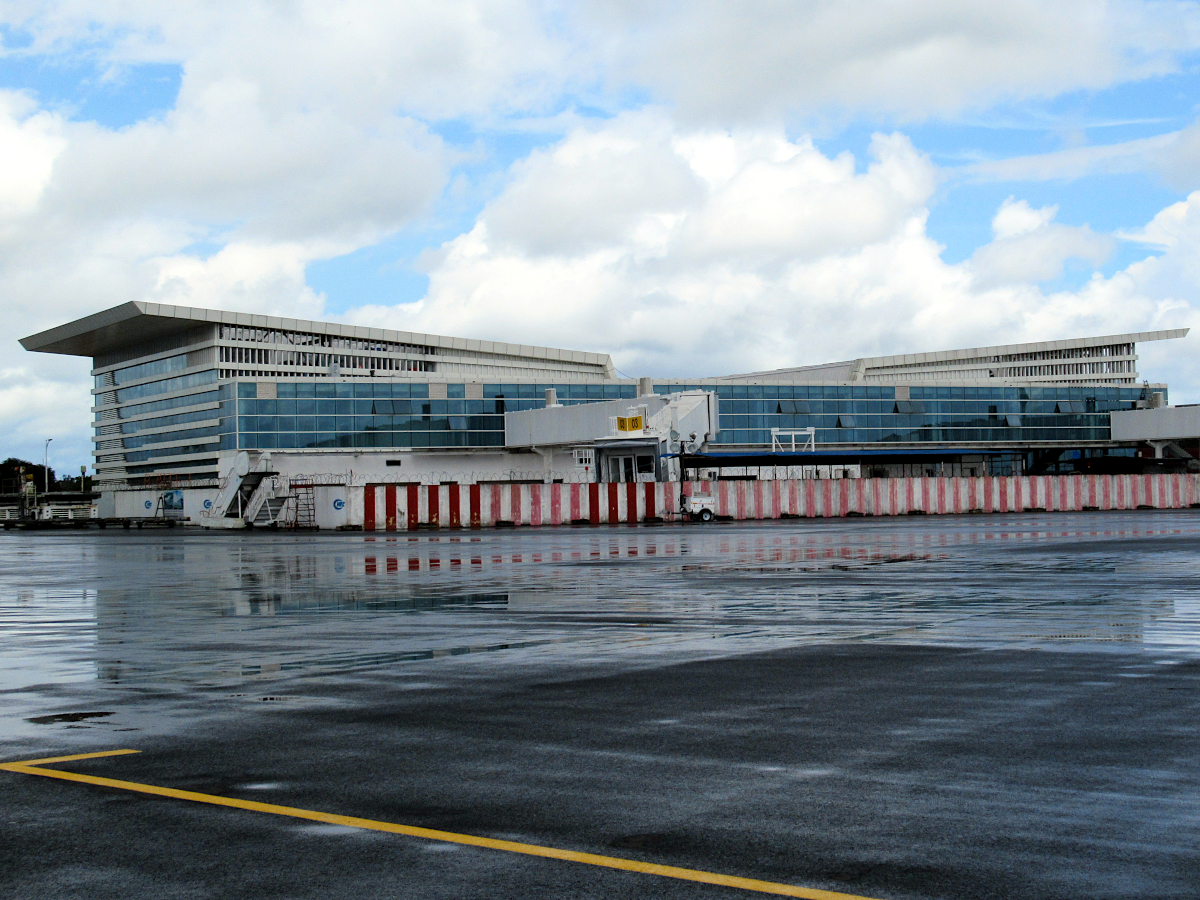
New Terminal Under Construction

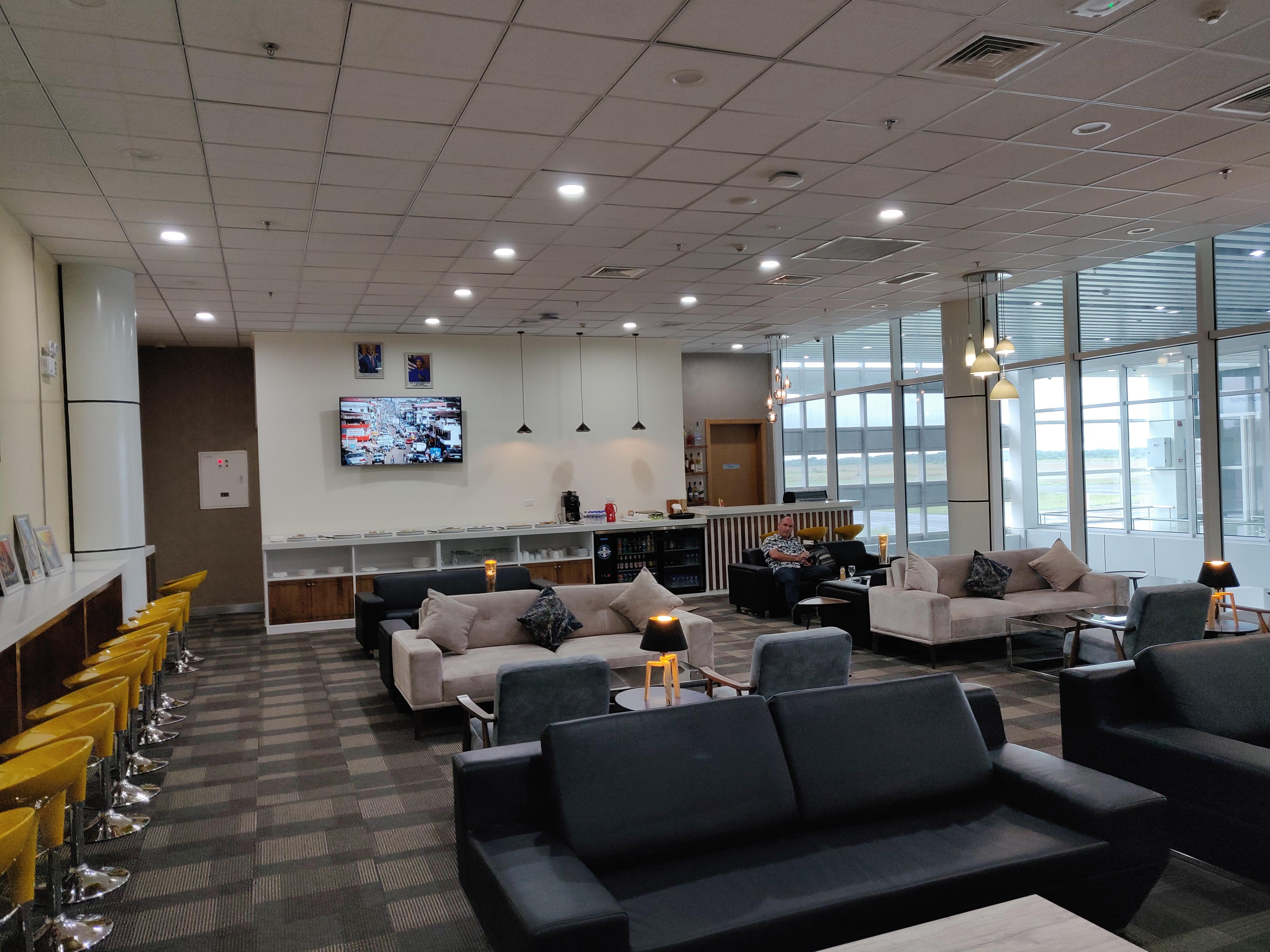
Business Class Lounge at the new international terminal

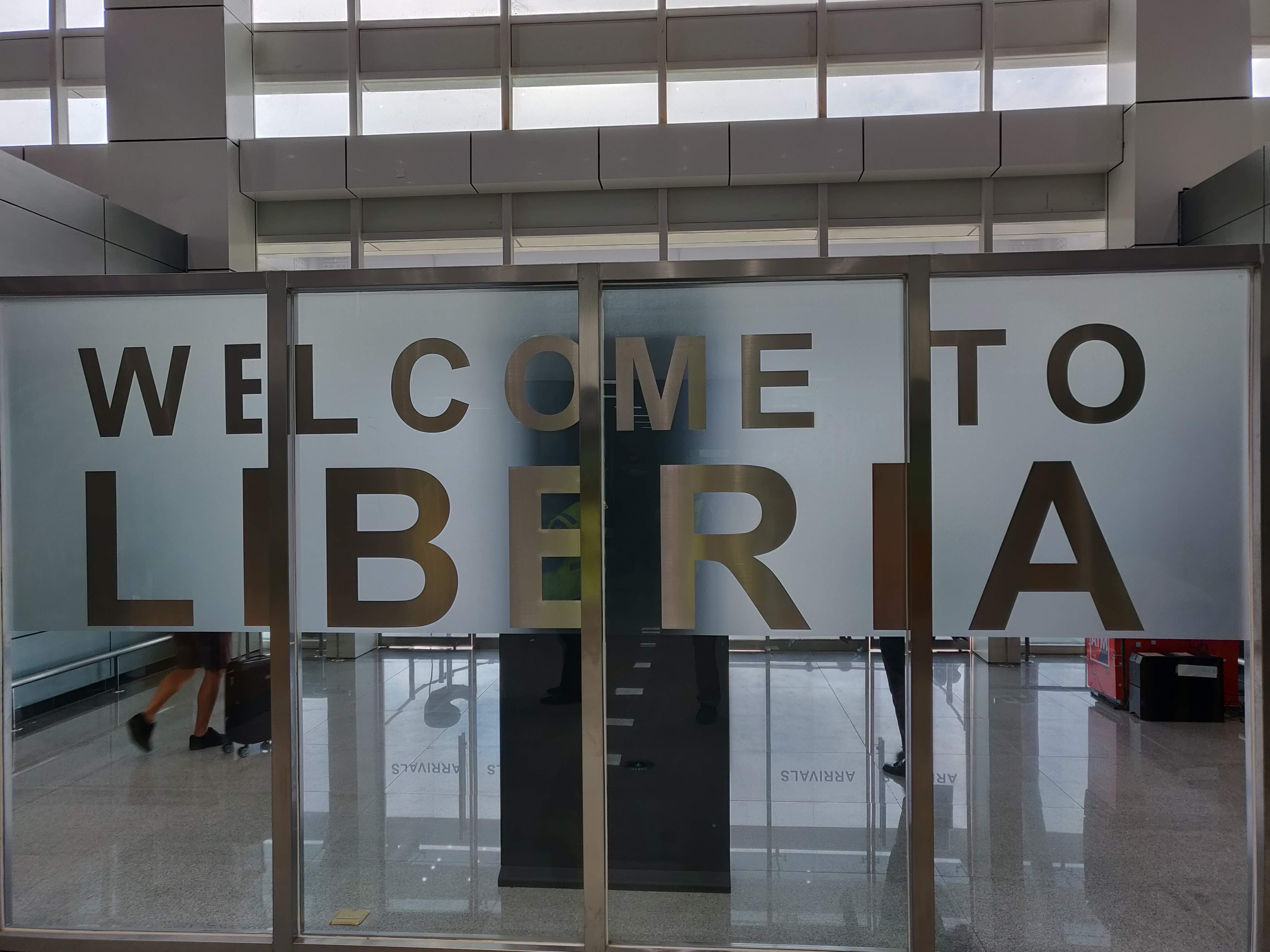
Baggage claim area of the new international terminal

Robertsfield's small, single-story terminals, in use since the end of the Civil War, were often overcrowded and did not conform to modern aviation standards, nor meet with the requirements set by the ICAO. In addition, the poor condition of RIA's single runway had been recognized as inadequate since at least 2012, when an Air France flight from Paris suffered significant damage to its landing gear, brakes and hydraulic systems during an arrival on the patched and potholed asphalt, an incident which cost as much as half a million dollars to the airline's plane and was cited as a contributing factor to the airline's decision to end service to Liberia .

The renovation project launched in 2018 completely overhauled nearly every aspect of the airport to meet international civil aviation regulations and allow for expanded passenger and cargo operations. The previous 57,000-square-metre (610,000 sq ft) tarmac apron was expanded to 85,000 square metres (910,000 sq ft). New car parking facilities and access roads were added to the landside area, while water supply sewage treatment, electrical and communication systems were also upgraded, adding new fire-fighting equipment and other safety systems, as well as mobile equipment including forklifts, ambulances, conveyor belt loaders, in addition to passenger stairs and buses for remote stand deplaning.

The new 5,000 m^{2} two-level main passenger facility salvaged the structure of the airport's original terminal, which had been destroyed during the Civil War and sat burnt-out and vacant for nearly 15 years. It is designed to handle 320,000 passengers per year. The ground floor features a departures hall with check-in desks and security screening, and an arrivals hall baggage handling, baggage claim with international-standard luggage carousels as well as a waiting area to greet passengers. The upper level is a departures gallery with retail spaces and a business lounge. One of the most notable features of the new passenger terminal are the two jetway contact bridges—a first in the airport's history.

The total project funding was reported to be US$80m—the new passenger terminal costing $50m, while the runway refurbishment was completed at a cost of $30m. China's Export-Import (EXIM) Bank financed the new terminal project through a 22-month, $49.8m concessional loan, whereas the runway refurbishment was financed by $20m from the Saudi Fund for Development, $10m from the Arab Bank for Economic Development for Africa, and $3m from the Government of Liberia. In November 2014, the European Investment Bank (EIB) agreed to provide a $27.3m (~$35.5 million in 2024) loan over a period of 20 years to the Liberian government in support the rehabilitation project at the RIA. This contract was finalised in February 2015.

Construction commenced in a formal groundbreaking ceremony held in September 2016. The new two-story terminal was officially dedicated by President Sirleaf in December 2017, although the building would not be commissioned and put into actual passenger use for another 18 months.

In September 2018, the Liberia Airport Authority announced that commercial airline operations were not expected to move into the new building before the end of 2018. President George Weah re-dedicated the new terminal in a ceremony on 24 July 2019, and passenger flights began limited use of the new facilities thereafter, although the two passenger jet bridges were not initially operational. The new terminal was fully operational by September 2019, including the jet bridges and the new business class lounge.

== Airlines and destinations ==
The following airlines offer scheduled passenger flights at Roberts International Airport :

Airlines	Destinations
Air Côte d'Ivoire	Abidjan, Conakry
Air Peace	Accra, Lagos
ASKY Airlines	Abidjan, Accra, Banjul, Lomé
Brussels Airlines	Brussels, Freetown
Ethiopian Airlines	Addis Ababa, Freetown
Kenya Airways	Accra, Nairobi–Jomo Kenyatta
Royal Air Maroc	Casablanca
Turkish Airlines	Accra, Istanbul (all flights suspended)

== Accidents and incidents ==
- On 3 February 1944 a 26 Squadron SAAF Vickers Wellington Bomber (HZ524) trying to land at Roberts Field in darkness and fog overshot the runway and hit a tree. The burned-out remains were found 4 kilometres from the airfield. All crew members perished. They were: DHG Lawrence, DE McNab, IV Rowe, P Cronin, WR Scott, RLB Fillis and DC Long, Air Mechanics ER Andrews & FB Sundstrom.
- On 5 March 1967, a Varig Douglas DC-8-33 registration PP-PEA operating flight 837 from Rome-Fiumicino to Monrovia caught fire after a mistaken approach to Monrovia, missing the threshold of the runway by 1,836 m (6,023 ft). Of the 90 passengers and crew aboard 51 died as well as 5 on the ground.
- On 19 April 1975, an Air Liberia Douglas C-47A registration EL-AAB was damaged beyond economic repair in a take-off accident. All 25 people on board survived.
- On 13 January 1989, an Aeroflot Tupolev Tu-154S (CCCP-85067) operating a cargo flight, overran the runway following a rejected takeoff at Monrovia - Roberts International Airport. There were no fatalities amongst the crew, but the aircraft was damaged and written off. The aircraft was overloaded and the cargo had shifted, causing the center of gravity to move forward.
- On 29 May 2025, a private jet carrying Liberian president Joseph Boakai from a visit to Nigeria made a rough landing at the airport after its tires burst upon landing, prompting the cancellation of all overnight flights. No injuries were reported.

== See also ==
- List of airports in Liberia
