= Gambia International Airlines =

Former flag carrier airline of The Gambia

Gambia International Airlines Ltd

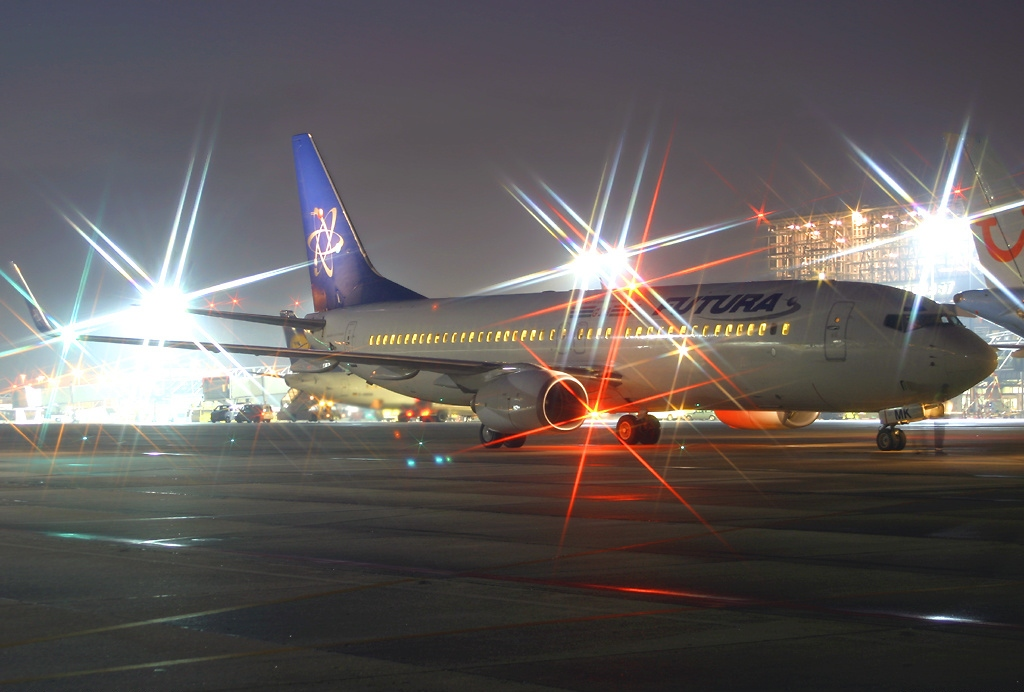
- Futura operated this aircraft for GIA
IATA	ICAO	Call sign
GC	GNR	GAMBIA INTERNATIONAL
- Founded: January 23 1996
- Commenced operations: March 1 1996
- Ceased operations: 2007 (as an airline)
- Operating bases: Banjul International Airport
- Parent company: Government of The Gambia
- Headquarters: Banjul, The Gambia
- Key people: Mr. Numo K. Sanneh, Awa Samba Jeng
- Website: https://gia.gm/

Gambia International Airlines Limited (GIA) was the national carrier of the Gambia. GIA currently provides air transportation and related services to carriers operating at Banjul International Airport. The flight operation unit of GIA has been dormant due to lack of financing.

== History ==
Gambia International Airlines was established on 23 January 1996 and started operations on 1st March 1996. GIA was established to take over the activities of the then-defunct Gambia Airways. The airline's flights were operated by Air Namibia in 2000, however despite making a profit in 2003 the airline was shut down in 2004 due to operational problems with flights ceasing in 2007.

== Flights ==
Several attempts were made at joint operations including:

- Air Namibia (2001)
- Safair (2003)
- Futura (2003-2005)
- TACV (2008-2010)
- Air Mauritania (2014)

== Destinations ==
Prior to closure, GIA through partnerships flew to the following destinations from Banjul International Airport:

- Nigeria
  - Lagos - Murtala Muhammed International Airport
- Senegal
  - Dakar - Léopold Sédar Senghor International Airport
- Mauritania
  - Nouakchott - Oumtounsy International Airport
- Sierra Leone
  - Freetown - Lungi International Airport
- United Kingdom
  - London - London Gatwick Airport

== Fleet ==
Over the years, the Gambia International Airlines fleet consisted of the following aircraft:

- 1 Boeing 737-200
- 1 Boeing 737-800
- 1 ATR-72
- Fokker F 28

== See also ==
- Transport in the Gambia
