= Air Gambia =

Gambia-based airline

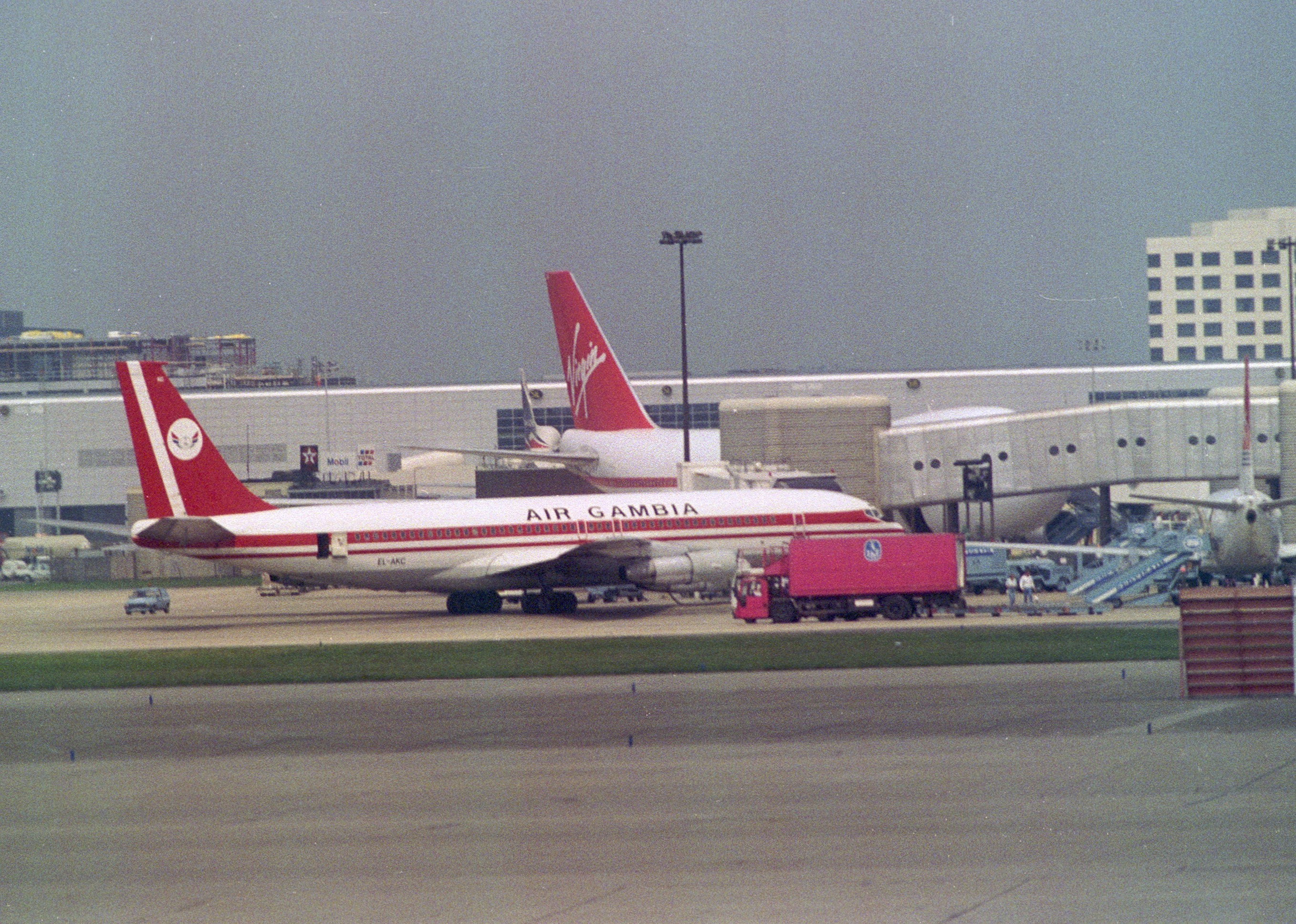
| IATA | ICAO | Call sign |
|---|---|---|
| IV | AGS | ATLAS |
- Founded: 1990
- Commenced operations: 1991
- Ceased operations: January 18 1994
- Hubs: Banjul Airport
- Fleet size: 1

Air Gambia was a Gambia-based airline.

== History ==
Air Gambia was founded in 1990 and commenced operations in 1991, the company Omega Air had a 40% stake in the airline.

In June 1992 a proposed Freetown-Banjul-New York route was proposed which was denied by the FAA. The airline faced something similar in 1993 when Air Gambia lost its permit to fly to London despite the fact these aircraft were maintained by Florida West International Airlines who had the green light from Modern Jet Support.

When the permission for Air Gambia to operate the route was revoked joint British Airways and Gambian Government airline Gambia Airways took over the route.

It took a while for the airline to replace the aircraft to bring stranded tourists home but an A320 was eventually chartered to do so.

The airline also operated a Boeing 737-300.

However, in 1993 already in bankruptcy filings the airline tried using the IL 62 on the London route but never was able to and ceased operating on January 18, 1994.

=== Revival ===
There appears to be another airline planning to fly under the Air Gambia Name.

== Fleet ==
- 2 Boeing 707-120B
- 5 Boeing 707-320B
- 1 Ilyushin 62M

== Destinations ==
In the winter season of 1991 the destinations were as follows:

- The Gambia: Banjul
- Sierra Leone: Freetown
- United Kingdom: London (revoked)
- United States: New York (proposed)

== See also ==
- List of defunct airlines of the Gambia
