= Mid Africa Aviation =

Gambian passenger airline

| IATA | ICAO | Call sign |
|---|---|---|
| — | MFG | — |
- Founded: April 28, 2014
- Commenced operations: May 15, 2017 (as an airline)
- Ceased operations: March 20, 2020
- Destinations: 5
- Key people: Gasm Elhaliq Babiker

Mid Africa Aviation or Fly Mid Africa was a passenger airline based out of the Gambia.

== History ==
Mid Africa Aviation was founded in 2014 as an asset managing company by Gasm Elhaliq Babiker and registered 14 aircraft with the Gambia Civil Aviation Authority.

The airline targeted its launch as May 15, 2017.

In 2017 the airline commenced operations and would begin with services to Freetown in Sierra Leone using the Boeing 737 Classic and had its first flights to Banjul and Dakar.

Shortly after commencing operations in June 2017 Mid Africa would commence flights to Lagos.

The same year it landed a contract with a news company called Newsrest Ghana.

Taron Avia Boeing 737s were added to the Mid Africa Aviation fleet in late 2019.

Due to severe debt GSA and Peacock travel wanted to help Mid Africa clear its debt from the 11 million Nigerian Narias it owed.

== See also ==
List of defunct airlines of The Gambia
