= Atlantic City Express =

Atlantic City Express may refer to:

- Atlantic City Express (Amtrak), a former Amtrak service
- ACES (train), also known as the Atlantic City Express Service, was a rail service operated by New Jersey Transit.
