= Yundum =

- Location in Gambia
- Coordinates: 13°21′N 16°47′W
- Country: The Gambia
- Division: Banjul

Yundum is a small town in Gambia, south of the capital, Banjul. It is situated adjacent to the country's international airport.

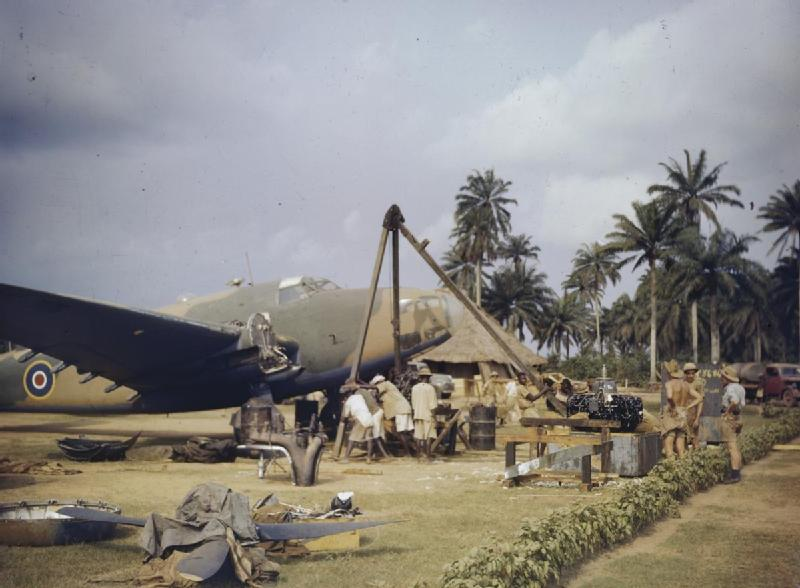
Royal Air Force fitters assisted by native helpers change the engine of a Lockheed Hudson aircraft at a base, using an improvised hoist (1943)

The only airport in Gambia is at Yundum, built in World War II. Post war it was used for passenger flights. Both British South American Airways and the British Overseas Airways Corporation had services, the former moving to Dakar, which had a concrete runway (as opposed to pierced steel planking). The airport was rebuilt in 1963. The town is divided into New and Old Yundum.

== Yundum Airport ==
The only airport available in the Gambia is located in New Yundum.
