= Gambia Civil Aviation Authority =

Civil aviation authority of The Gambia

The Gambia Civil Aviation Authority (GCAA) is the civil aviation authority of The Gambia. The agency head office is located at Banjul International Airport in Banjul.

It is an autonomous government body. It was established under the Public Enterprise Act of 1989 in July 1991 as an autonomous government body.
