= Central Bank of the Gambia =

Central Bank of Gambia

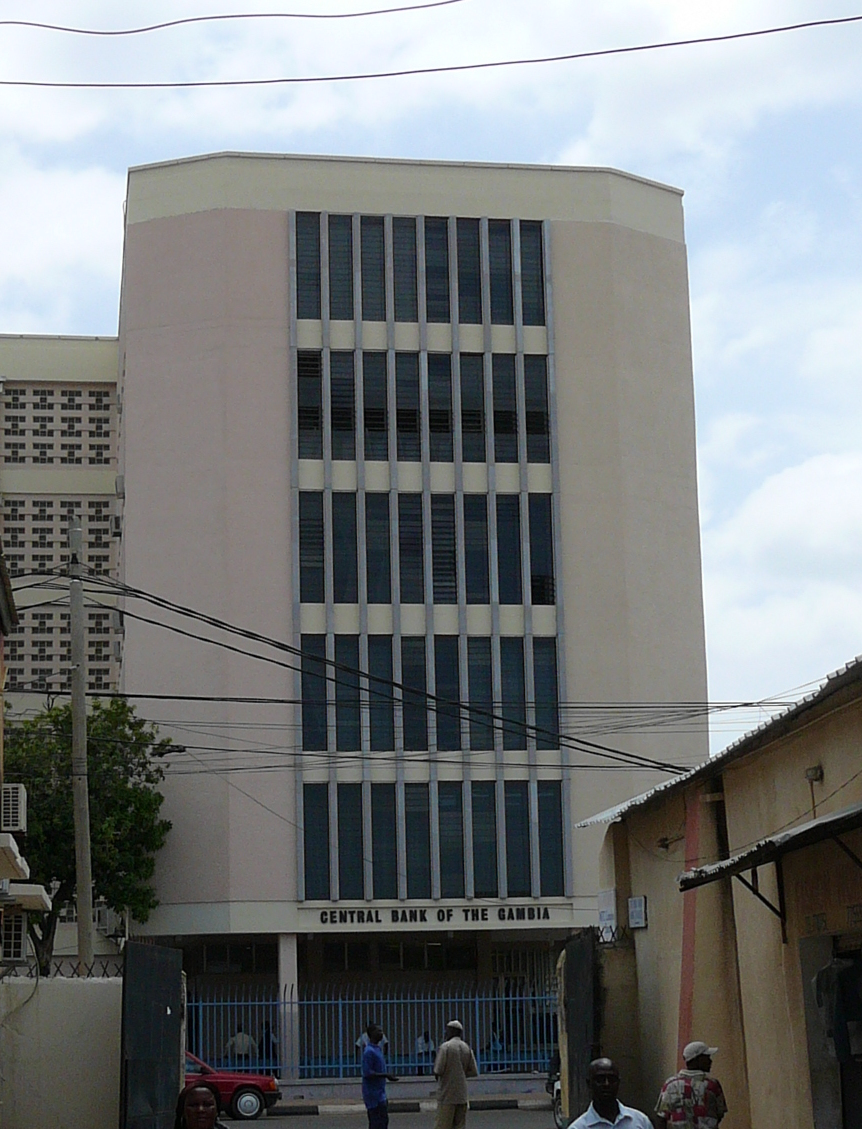
- Central bank of: Gambia
- Headquarters: No. 1/2 Ecowas Avenue, Banjul, The Gambia
- Established: 1971
- Ownership: 100% state ownership
- Governor: Buah Saidy
- Currency: Gambian dalasi GMD (ISO 4217)
- Website: https://www.cbg.gm/

The Central Bank of The Gambia is the central bank of The Gambia. Its name is abbreviated to CBG. The bank is located in Banjul and was established in 1971. Buah Saidy is the current Governor.

== Operations ==
As a central bank, CBG is responsible for providing banking services to the Gambian government, for managing interest rates and foreign exchange, for interacting with Gambian industries, for supporting microfinance, and for managing the value of the country's currency, the Gambian dalasi. The bank is responsible for managing the sale of Gambian bonds and treasury bills on the international securities market. The bank is involved in economic research in regard to the future of Gambia and West Africa.

The CBG is working with GIPFZA, the Gambia Investment Promotion and Free Zones Agency, in the creation of a 1.6 square kilometre business and industrial park near Banjul International Airport.

The CBG is the only institution in The Gambia that is permitted to issue the dalasi.

== Governors of the Central Bank of The Gambia ==
- Horace Reginald Monday, Mar 1971 - Nov 1972
- Sheriff Saikuba Sisay, Dec 1972 - Apr 1982
- Thomas Gregory George Senghore, May 1982 - Feb 1988
- Mamour Malick Jagne, ? - 1991 - ?
- Abdou A. B. Njie ? - 1994
- Momodou Clarke Bajo, 1994 - 2003
- Famara Jatta, 2003 - 2007
- Momodou Bamba Saho, 2007 - 2010
- Amadou Colley, 2010 - 2017
- Bakary Jammeh, 2017 - 2020
- Buah Saidy - since 1 October 2020

== See also ==
- Central banks and currencies of Africa
- Economy of the Gambia
- List of central banks
