= Transport in the Gambia =

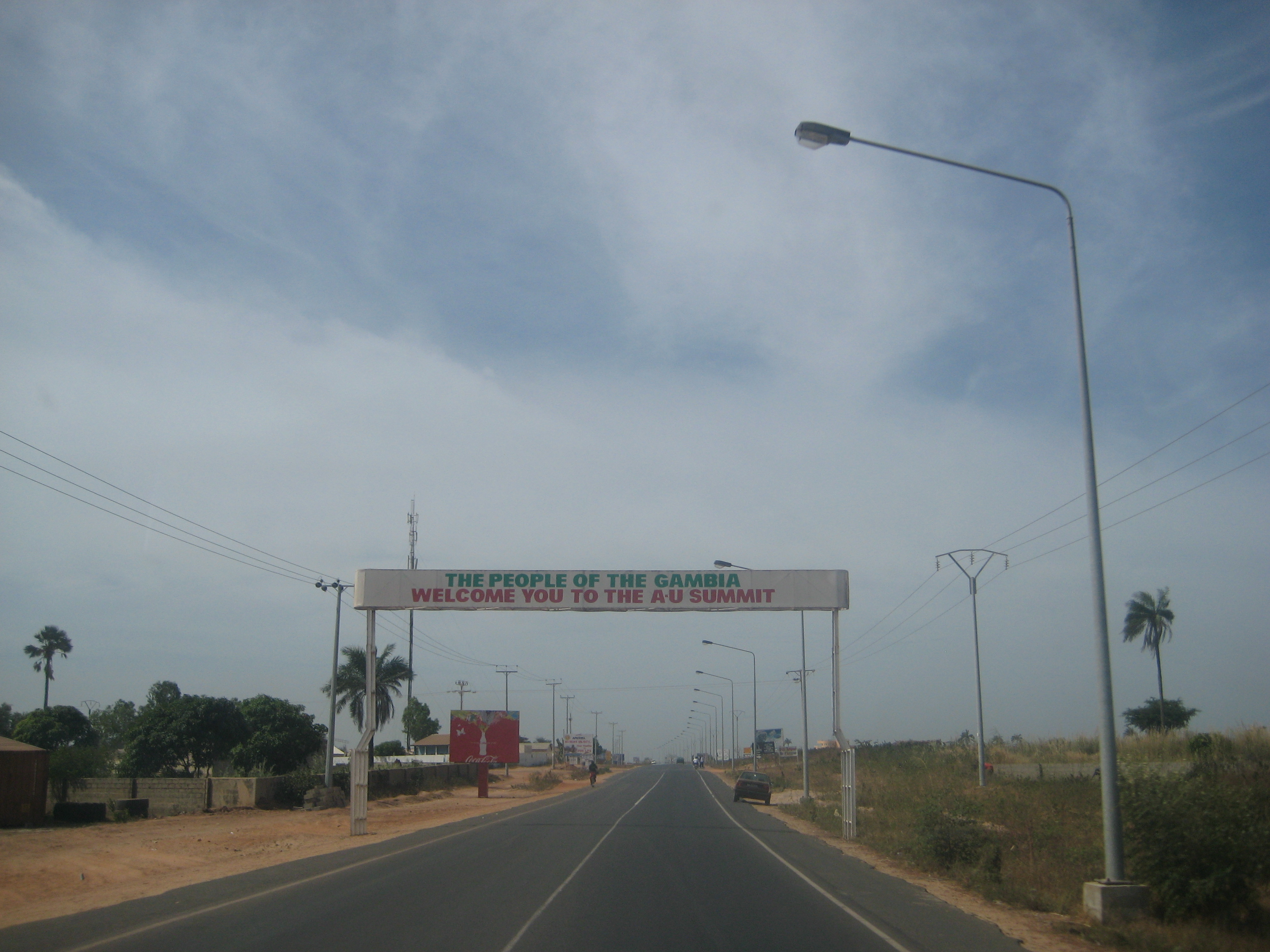
A road in Gambia, 2007.

The system of transportation in the Gambia mixes both public and private operations and consists of a system of roads (both paved and unpaved), water and air transportation. The Trans-Gambia Highway runs along both sides of the river Gambia, which bisects the country. The river may be crossed by ferry or the Senegambia bridge. There are no railways in the country.

== History ==
During the colonial era, several small railways existed in the Gambia. One, in Bathurst (now Banjul), stretched from Wellington Street to The Marina, now Liberation Avenue and Marina Parade respectively. A War Office map from 1909 clearly shows the railway. Both Kuntaur and Kaur had similar railways from the wharfs to the warehouses. The railways had hand-pushed wagons for transporting of goods from ships. They were used by large companies involved in trading, such as Maurel & Prom. These railways existed until the 1960s.

== Railways ==
Currently there are no railways in the country.

== Roads ==
Highways:
The most important highway in the Gambia is the Trans-Gambia Highway.

total: 3,742 km
(country comparison to the world: 159) paved: 723 km
unpaved: 3,019 km (2004) Newly paved roads are usually in excellent condition.

== Waterways ==
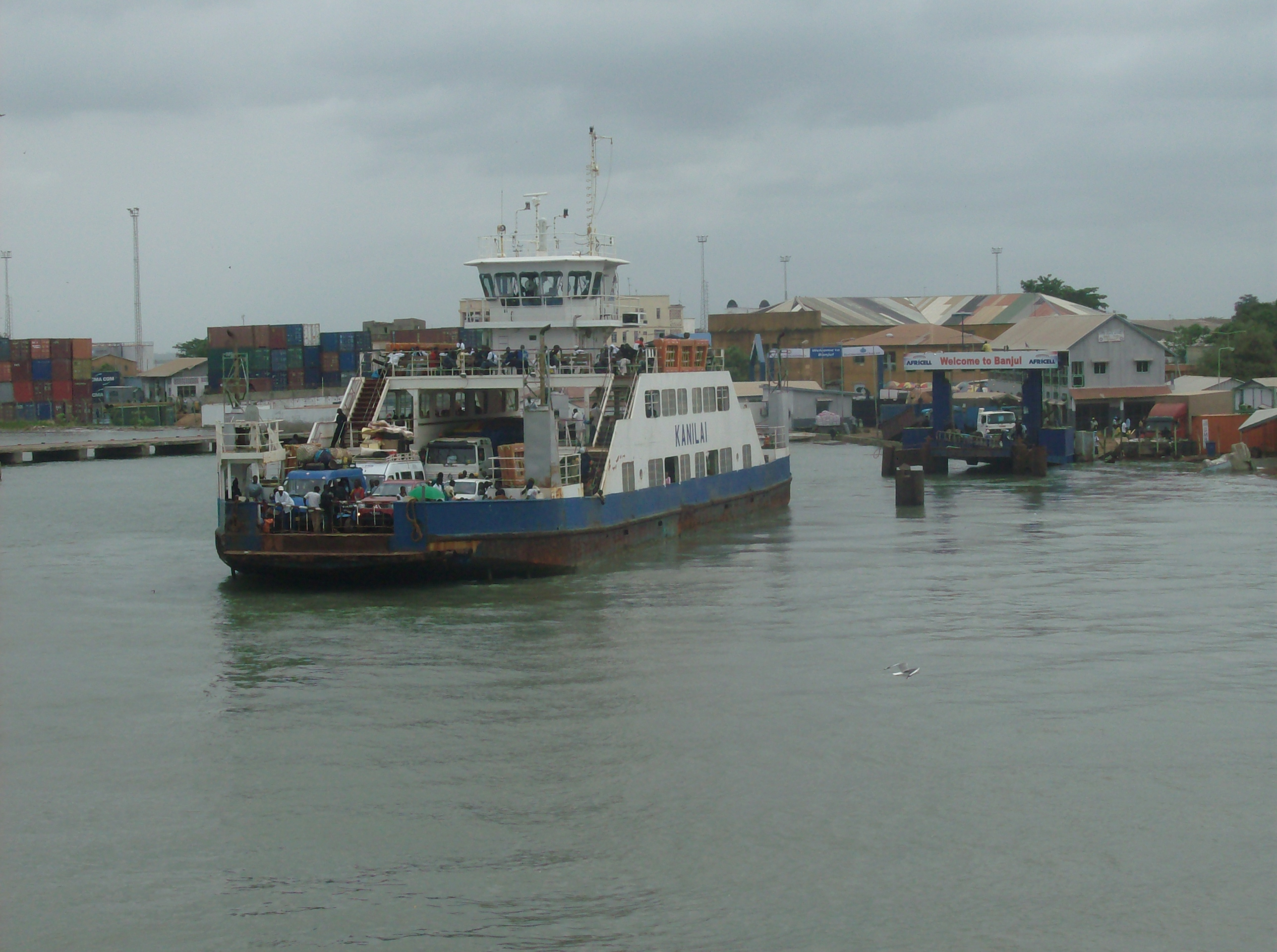
The Banjul ferry.

Waterways: 390 km (small ocean-going vessels can reach 190 km) (2008)
country comparison to the world: 90

Ports and harbours: Banjul, Gambia Ports Authority

Merchant marine:
total:'5
country comparison to the world: 133 by type: passenger/cargo: 4, petroleum tanker 1 (2008)

Imports of animals, marine life, plants, their products and processed foods of plant or animal origin must be accompanied by an import certificate under the health and sanitary provisions of the Food Act 2005.

== Airports ==
Banjul International Airport, 2009.

The country's only international airport is at Yundum, 26 km from Banjul.

Airports: 1 (2008): Banjul International Airport Yundum.
country comparison to the world: 133

Airports - with paved runways:
total: 1
over 3,047 m: 1 (2008)
