= Banjul International Airport =

International airport in Banjul, Gambia

- IATA: BJL; ICAO: GBYD

Summary
- Airport type: Public
- Serves: Banjul
- Location: Banjul, Gambia
- Elevation AMSL: 29 m (95 ft)
- Coordinates: 13°20′16.66″N 16°39′07.94″W
- Website: banjulairport.com

Map
- Location of airport in Gambia

Runways
Direction	Length		Surface
Direction	m	ft	Surface
14/32	3,600	11,811	Asphalt

Banjul International Airport, formerly known as Yundum International Airport (IATA: BJL, ICAO: GBYD), is an international airport serving Banjul, the capital of The Gambia. Built during World War II, it was a major emergency landing site for NASA Space Shuttles from 1988 to 2002. It is the country's only commercial airport.

== History ==
The only airport in Gambia is at Yundum. After World War II, Yundum Airport was used for passenger flights. Both British South American Airways and the British Overseas Airways Corporation had services, the former moving its service to Dakar, which had a concrete runway (as opposed to pierced steel planking). In 1960, a specialist team from the United Kingdom conducted a detailed survey of Yundum Airport, resulting in a report recommending the construction of a new runway, facilities, and installation of new equipment. As a result, the airport was rebuilt in 1963. Modern terminal was opened in 1997.

Zambia Airways launched service from Lusaka to New York via Banjul in December 1990. The airline flew the route with a McDonnell Douglas DC-10. Financial difficulties forced the carrier to suspend it three months later. In February 2001, Ghana Airways commenced a flight from Banjul to Baltimore, which originated in Accra. Cooperation among Ghana Airways, Gambia International Airlines, and the Ghanaian and Gambian governments had given rise to the service. In June 2006, North American Airlines inaugurated a link to Baltimore using Boeing 767s; the route lasted seven months.

== Overview ==
The head office of the Gambia Civil Aviation Authority is located on the airport property.

In the event of an emergency on any of the NASA Space Shuttles, Banjul International Airport had been selected as an augmented landing site, replacing Léopold Sédar Senghor International Airport in Dakar, Senegal for its better space for improvement. Banjul was the perfect location when the shuttle was launched with a low, 28.5-degree inclination. In 2001, NASA announced that Banjul airport would no longer be used as an augmented landing site because future shuttle launches would take place at inclinations of up at 51.6 degrees to reach the International Space Station, making air bases in Spain and France more suitable for an emergency landing.

The airport was the main hub of Gambia Bird until the airline ceased operations in late 2014.

== Airlines and destinations ==
Airlines	Destinations
Air Peace	Abidjan, Dakar–Diass, Lagos
Air Sierra Leone	London–Gatwick
Air Senegal	Dakar–Diass
ASKY Airlines	Accra, Freetown
Brussels Airlines	Brussels, Conakry, Dakar–Diass
Corendon Dutch Airlines	Seasonal: Amsterdam
Jet2.com	Seasonal charter: London–Gatwick
Royal Air Maroc	Casablanca
Smartwings Slovakia	Seasonal charter: Bratislava
Sunclass Airlines	Seasonal charter: Copenhagen, Helsinki, Stockholm–Arlanda, Oslo
TAP Air Portugal	Lisbon
Transair	Dakar–Diass, Freetown
TUI Airways	Seasonal: Birmingham, London–Gatwick, Manchester
TUI fly Belgium	Seasonal: Brussels
TUI fly Netherlands	Amsterdam
Turkish Airlines	Istanbul, Nouakchott
ValueJet	Accra, Lagos
Vueling	Barcelona

== Accidents and incidents ==
- On 10 October 1997, a Beechcraft 200 Super King Air operated by NAYSA Aerotaxis crashed on approach 3 miles before the runway. All but one of the ten occupants died.

== See also ==
- Transport in the Gambia
- List of airports by ICAO code: G#GB - The Gambia
