= Mama Bobi III =

Mama Bobi III is the Queen-mother of Bake - Ho Bankoe in the Asogli traditional area located in the Volta Region of Ghana. She was enstooled in April, 2022 and holds the title of Afetornyonufia. Mama Bobi III is involved in advocating for women's empowerment, education and community development in her jurisdiction and beyond.

== Early life and education ==
Mama Bobi III was born Angela Attachie on 2nd October, 1985, to the late Togbe Adu Bobi III, the traditional leader of the Bobi family, and Madam Florence Mawusi Afeatse. She grew up in Ho where she attended OLA Secondary School before furthering her education at the University of Ghana, where she earned a Bachelor's degree in Political Science in 2008.

Following her undergraduate studies, she pursued her LLB (Bachelor's of Laws) at the same university and was called to the bar in 2013. She later joined the judiciary in 2016, currently serving as a circuit court judge at the Madina District Court in Accra, Ghana.

Mama Bobi III is married with two children.

== Career ==
Before ascending to the throne, Mama Bobi III worked as a practicing lawyer. She briefly worked in legal practice before transitioning to the judiciary. In 2016, she was appointed as a circuit court judge, where she serves in the Madina District Court.

In addition to her legal career, Mama Bobi III is the co-founder and benefactor of DA Humanitarian Foundation, an organisation focused on supporting various charitable causes in her community, with a particular emphasis on the welfare of women and youth.

== Chieftaincy ==
In April 2022, Mama Bobi III was enstooled as Asafonyornufia of the Bake-Ho community in the Asogli traditional area. The Bobi family, traditionally holding the position of Asafofiage on Ho Bankoe was elevated to the position of Afetorfia of Bake-Ho Bankoe as part of an important reorganisation. Mama Bobi III's ascension marked the creation of the Afertonyonufia title.

== Advocacy and community development ==
Mama Bobi III is an advocate for the empowerment of women and youth in her community. She works to create opportunities for girls, particularly through skills development programmes. Mama Bobi III has organised health screening programmes during the Te Za Festival which include free services such as eye tests, breasts screening and the distribution of glasses to community members in need.
