= Mama Atrato II =

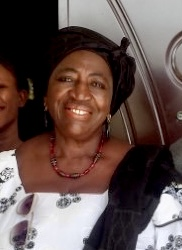
Mama Atrato II

Mama Atrato II (born 1949) is the queen mother of Ho-Dome in the Asogli Traditional area of the Volta region of Ghana.

== Personal life ==
She was born on 1 April 1949 in Ho and was named Josephine Dzah at birth. She has two children.

== Career ==
Mama Atrato II joined the Ghana Police Service in 1970. Upon completion of her training, she was assigned to the Special Branch Headquarters, which was renamed the Ghana Bureau of National Investigations where she worked for 40 years as an intelligence and security analyst. In 1998, she went to Bosnia Herzegovina on a peacekeeping mission. There, she studied International Human Rights and obtained a United Nations Certificate in Human Rights. Subsequently, she was appointed as the Human Rights Officer for the Tuzla Region for six months. She also served as chairperson of the Ho Nursing Training School for 8 years, and is still a member of the board. She was unanimously selected by representatives from the Traditional Council, Youth and Women's Groups, Christian Council, and the Chief Imam of the Volta Region to the position of Deputy Chairperson of the Regional Consultative Body of the National Commission for Civic Education (NCCE) in the Volta Region.

== Advocacy ==
Mama Atrato II has expressed keen interest in issues of health, especially the welfare of women. She has been involved in positive action measures towards maternal healthcare and newborn survival. Mama Atrato II has established schemes in her traditional area, with an aim of motivating social activism towards communal development. One of such schemes is the Asogli Maternal Health Prize for health workers, awarded to health workers in the region who have shown commitment to maternal and newborn survival. She has also been at the forefront of the establishment of an organisation, through which queen mothers work closely with the Ministry of Health to encourage pregnant women in remote communities to make scheduled maternal visits. Additionally, with the support of the Embassy of Japan, she has constructed a fully furnished classroom block in her community, has donated several books to the Ho-Dome primary school and the Ho Technical University, and sponsors the education of less fortunate young girls. She has also been involved in national campaigns on the adherence to the COVID-19 safety protocols, to prevent the spread of the virus.
