= List of Ghanaian films of 2017 =

This is a list of Ghanaian films released in 2017.

Title	Director	Cast (Subject of documentary)	Genre	Notes	Release date
Adam the Eve	Ingrid Alabi	Majid Michel, Ingrid Alabi			September 1
Ghana Single Ladies		Joselyn Dumas, Yvonne Nelson			
Perfect Love 2		Van Vicker, Jackie Appiah			
Potato Potahto		Adjetey Anang, Kafui Danku, Kwabena Kwabena			
Single Mum		Yvonne Nelson, James Gardiner			
Paulines's Diary	Ben Darkwa & Henry Hauwanga	Rhoda Okobea, Elikem Kumordzie, Roselyn Ngissa			
Crime Suspect	Frank Rajah Arase	Princess Shingle, Yvonne Nelson, Kofi Adjorlolo, John Dumelo, Nikki Samonas, Salma Mumin, Gifty Temeng, Dominic Demodze, Michael Williams, Jamal Jaffa			
Mad Dog					
89 Minutes To My Wedding		Prince David Osei, Louis Sefa Bonsu, Ellen White			
