= Attipoe =

Attipoe is a surname. Notable people with the surname include:

- Emmanuel Attipoe, Ghanaian footballer
- Felicia Edem Attipoe, Ghanaian female aircraft marshaller
- Patrick Attipoe, Ghanaian ex-serviceman shot dead in the 1948 Accra riots
- Philip Attipoe, Ghanaian sprinter
- Richard Attipoé, Togolese politician
