= Asogli Te Za =

Festival in Ghana by the people of Asogli in Ho

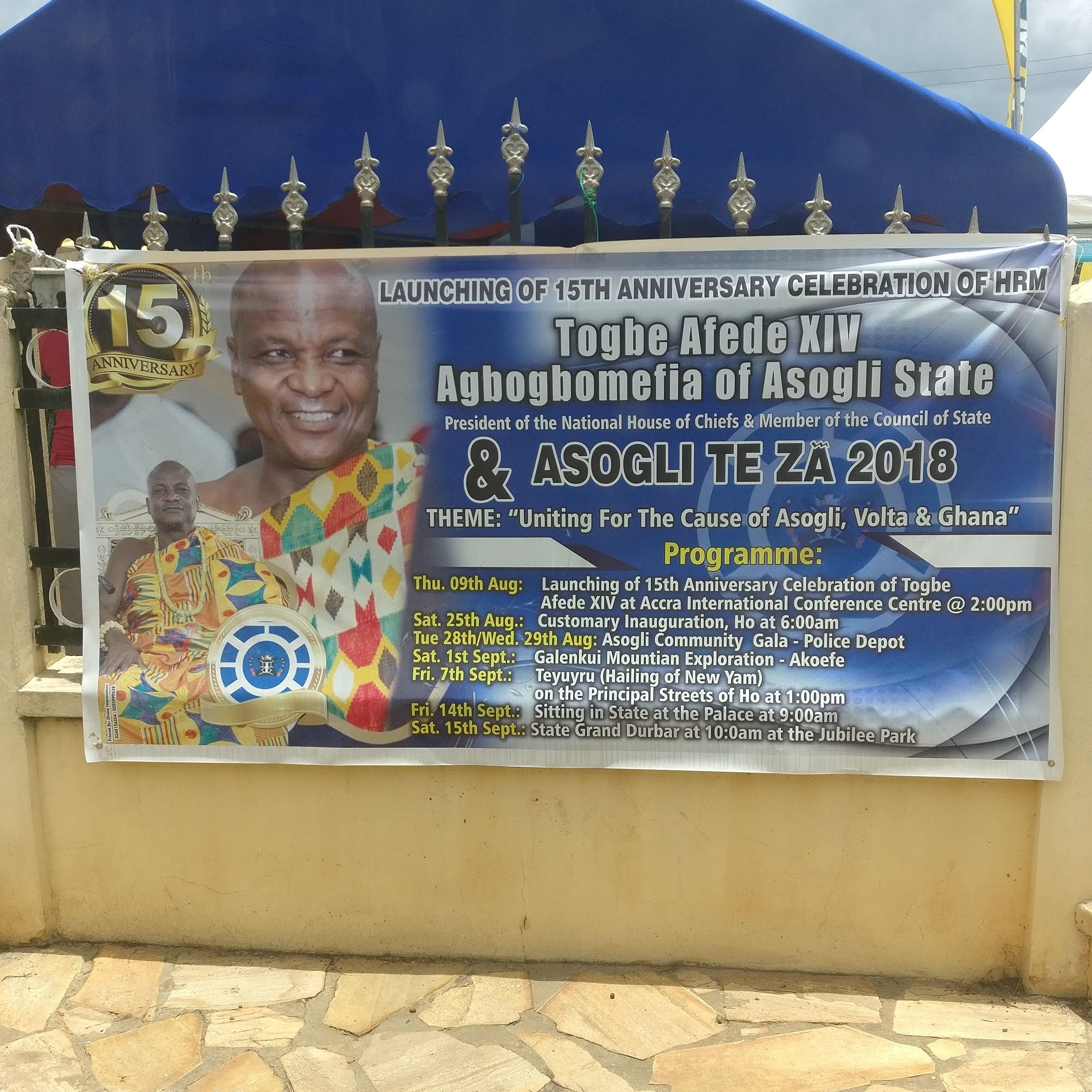
- Banner in Ho advertising the Asogli Te Za 2018 featuring Togbe Afede XIV
- Frequency: Annually
- Country: Ghana

Asogli Te Za (formerly Asogli Yam Festival) is an annual festival celebrated by the people of Asogli in the Ho Municipality located in the Volta Region of Ghana. It is held annually in September to celebrate the cultivation of yam in the region.

It is said that the cultivation of yam among the people of Asogli began when the yam hidden by the hunter during his expedition later germinated and flourished. The celebration was brought into Ghana by the Ewe people of Ghana when they migrated from Notse in the Republic of Togo, where it is still celebrated.

In 2004, Togbe Aƒede XIV brought back the celebration of the Yam Festival which had been abandoned for over a decade. With the goal of educating and entertaining both Ghanaians and visitors about Asogli traditions, the Yam Festival provides an opportunity for experiencing traditional music, dance, story telling and a grand durbar to end the festival. Togbe Aƒede XIV has provided leadership in uniting many chiefs throughout the Volta Region and extending to other parts of Ghana and Togo. As a result, many of these chiefs attend the Yam Festival.

On 8 May 2018, the name of the festival was changed to Te Za (Yam Festival) to reflect the history and culture of the people.

== Background ==
According to oral history, yam (Ewe: te, lit. 'it is swollen') was discovered by a hunter in the forest while on a hunting expedition. Instead of taking the tuber home, he hid it in the soil for future use. When he later went back for it, the tuber had germinated and grown bigger. This was how the cultivation of yam started.

== Festival origins ==
The celebration of the festival by the Ewe people originated from Notsé in Togo, where it is still celebrated. Yam cultivation is a very tedious job, and history has it that in those days some people who ventured into it did not live to enjoy the fruits of their labour. It was, and still is, labour-intensive, energy sapping and quite hazardous, hence the proverb "Ne wonye eteti tsogbe wo dua ete la, ne egbor ma kpor etsroa ha du o” (lit. 'if it were during the day of planting of yam that yam is eaten, the goat would never taste the peel'). Diligence was therefore required and the permission and guidance of the gods of the land and the ancestors was sought during the entire period from planting through harvesting.

During the harvest time (normally in September), the gods and ancestors are served first with the boiled and mashed yam (Ewe: bakabake), normally white and red-oiled, before any living being tastes it. This rite is called Dzawuwu. After that, the rest of the mashed yam is eaten as a communal meal, a symbol of unity and reconciliation of families, clans and the entire community.
