= Adaklu-Kodzobi =

Adaklu-Kodzobi is a town located in Adaklu District of Volta Region of Ghana. IIt is Situated close to Ho Technical University and the University of Health and Allied Sciences (UHAS).
