= Agnes Dordzie =

Ghanaian judge

Justice Agnes Mercy Abla Dordzie

Justice of the Supreme Court of Ghana
- In office 13 July 2018 – 2 October 2022
- Appointed by: Nana Akuffo-Addo

Appeal Court Judge
- In office July 2010 – 2018
- Nominated by: John Atta Mills

High Court Judge
- In office November 1995 – July 2010
- President: Jerry John Rawlings

Personal details
- Born: 2 October 1952 (age 74) Ghana
- Education: OLA Girls Senior High School (Ho); University of Ghana; Commonwealth Open University; Ghana School of Law
- Profession: Judge

Agnes Mercy Abla Dordzie is a Ghanaian judge. She was an active justice of the Supreme Court of Ghana until October 2022. She was appointed justice of the Supreme Court in 2018.

Dordzie was born in Taviefe-Deme in the Volta Region. After her studies at the Ghana School of Law, she was called to the bar. She worked as a state attorney and a private legal practitioner prior to serving on the bench. She has served on the bench from magistrate level to the Supreme Court of Ghana.

== Early life and education ==
Dordzie was born 2 October 1952 at Taviefe-Deme in the Volta Region of Ghana.

She began schooling at the Roman Catholic Primary School at Taviefe-Deme from 1957 to 1962. She started middle school in 1964 at the Roman Catholic Girls Middle school in Ho but moved a year later to Atibie Methodist Middle School in Atibie, Kwahu. She spent a year there as well before joining L/A Presby 'B' Extension Middle School in Koforidua where she obtained her Middle School Leaving Certificate in 1966. She began her secondary education at Awudome Secondary School in Tsito and continued at OLA Girls Secondary School, Ho in 1969. There, she obtained her Ordinary Level ('O'-Level) certificate in 1972 and her Advanced Level ('A'-Level) certificate in 1974. She proceeded to the University of Ghana to study Law and Political Science from 1974 to 1977. In January 1979, she enrolled at the Ghana School of Law graduating in November 1980 with a Barrister-at-law degree. She was called to the bar in November 1980. In 2007 she pursued a master's degree program in International Relations at the Commonwealth Open University, British Virgin Islands, United Kingdom (Long Distance Learning) graduating in 2010. She also enrolled at the Institute of Theological Studies to study a six-month diploma course in Christian Counselling in 2014.

== Career ==
Dordzie worked as a national service personnel at the National Council on Women and Development at Koforidua from 1977 to 1978. After she was called to the bar in November 1980, she joined the Attorney General's Department as an assistant state attorney until January 1983. A month later, she moved to Nigeria on a contract appointment to work with the Minister of Justice at Calabar, Cross River State as a state council. She later returned to Ghana to begin private legal practice at Adzoe Gbadegbe and Company. She remained in private legal practice until May 1987 when she appointed magistrate at Somanya. In November 1991 she was elevated to a Circuit Judge, working in Accra. She served as a High Court judge in Accra from November 1995 to November 2003. From December 2003 to November 2005, she was the supervising High Court judge of the Ashanti Region. Prior to her elevation to the Court of Appeal in July 2010, she was appointed by the Commonwealth Secretariat on the secondment of the Judiciary of Ghana to serve as a High Court judge in The Gambia. Dordzie was appointed justice of the Supreme Court of Ghana in 2018.

== Appointment ==
Dordzie was nominated together with three other judges (Samuel Marful-Sau, Justice Professor Nii Ashie Kotey and Justice Nene Amegatcher) by the president of Ghana, Nana Akufo-Addo in 2018. After the names were sent to parliament, there were claims that her appointment and the appointment of Justice Samuel Marful-Sau were rewards and not justified as their promotions occurred after they (Justice Samuel Marful-Sau and Justice Agnes Dordzie) recommended that Electoral Commission Chair, Mrs. Charlotte Osei and her deputies be removed from office. The government however dismissed these claims claiming the nominations were in consultation with the Council of State and based on the advice of the Judicial Council. She was vetted in August 2018 and sworn into office in October 2018.

== See also ==
- List of judges of the Supreme Court of Ghana
- Supreme Court of Ghana
