= George Buadi (judge) =

Ghanaian judge

George Buadi is a Ghanaian High Court judge. In 2019, he was the presiding judge at the Accra High Court. In 2021, he also presided in the motion "The Republic versus High Court, Ho, ex parte Attorney General (Applicant), Professor Margaret Kweku, Simon Alan Opoku-Minta, John Kwame Obompeh, Godfred Koku Fofie, Felix Quarshie (interested parties)". In 2024, he was the sitting Judge at the Ho High Court. In 2025, John Mahama sworn him as a Justice of the Court of Appeal along with 20 others.
