= Kgosi Rebecca Banika =

Botswanan tribal leader

Kgosi Rebecca Banika is the traditional leader for the Pandamatenga village in the Chobe district of Botswana. Pandamatenga is a diverse settlement consisting of eight ethnic groups. She was installed on 15 November 1999, being the first woman to be installed as a chief in Botswana, and the first to be elected to the Ntlo ya Dikgosi (House of Chiefs), having been elected in 2000. In 2019, she was re-elected to the Ntlo ya Dikgosi as a representative for her district.

According to her, the thought of becoming a traditional leader was far-fetched due to the fact that she had older siblings who could have filled the position. When they expressed their lack of interest in ascending the throne after the death of their grandfather, Rebecca Banika was called upon to take the position of village chief.

Kgosi Rebecca Banika is one of the several women traditional leaders whose leadership is being studied under a University of Ghana project titled "Women and Political Participation in Africa: A Comparative Study of Representation and Role of Female Chiefs", which is funded by the Andrew W. Mellon Foundation. In this project, a mixed-methods approach is adopted to comparatively study women's representation in the institution of chieftaincy and their influence on women's rights and wellbeing in Botswana, Ghana, Liberia, and South Africa. Lead researchers on the project, Peace A. Medie, Adriana A. E Biney, Amanda Coffie and Cori Wielenga, have also published an opinion piece titled "Women traditional leaders could help make sure the pandemic message is heard" in The Conversation news, which discusses how women traditional leaders can educate their subjects on COVID-19.
