= Nene Amegatcher =

Ghanaian judge, lawyer and academic

Justice Nene Amegatcher

Justice of the Supreme Court of Ghana
- In office 3 October 2018 – 28 July 2023
- Appointed by: Nana Akufo-Addo

Personal details
- Born: 3 February 1953 (age 73) Ghana
- Education: Presbyterian Boys' Senior High School; Apam Senior High School; University of Ghana; Ghana School of Law; Nottingham Law School, Nottingham Trent University
- Profession: Judge

Nene Abayateye Ofoe Amegatcher is a Ghanaian lawyer, academic and judge. He served as a justice of the Supreme Court of Ghana from 3 October 2018 to 28 July 2023.

He was born in Suhum, where he began his formal education. After his call to the Bar in 1980, he began teaching while working as a private legal practitioner. Prior to his appointment, he was the managing partner of Sam Okudzeto and Associates and a senior lecturer at the Ghana School of Law since 1994.

Amegatcher is a member of the Ghana Bar Association and once served as president of the association from 2012 to 2015. He is also a member of the International Bar Association, the Commonwealth Lawyers Association, the Lagos Arbitration Center, the American Bar Foundation, the ICC Court of Arbitration-Paris, London Court of International Arbitration Users' Council and the Chartered Institute of Arbitrators, United Kingdom.

== Early life and education ==
Amegatcher was born on 3 February 1953 at Suhum in the Eastern Region. He began his early education at the Suhum Presbyterian Primary School in 1958 and continued at Anumle Primary School in Achimota and Akropong Demonstration Primary School from 1960 to 1962 and from 1962 to 1964, respectively. He entered the Aburi Presbyterian Boys' Middle School where he obtained his Middle School leaving Certificate. In 1966 he proceeded to the Presbyterian Boys Secondary School for his Ordinary Level certificate ('O'-Level) which he obtained in 1971. That same year he enrolled at the Accra Workers' College to re-write the 'O'-Level Mathematics, Economics and Government papers. In 1972, he entered Apam Secondary School for his Advanced Level certificate ('A'-Level) which he obtained in 1974.

He proceeded to the University of Ghana later that year to study Law and Political Science, graduating in 1977. He studied at the Ghana School of Law from 1978 to 1980 and was called to the bar upon completion in November 1980. Amegatcher holds a certificate in Alternative Dispute Resolution from the California State University, Sacramento which he obtained in 1996. He also obtained a certificate in Commercial Dispute Resolution from the United States Department of Commerce in 2001 and a certificate in Commercial Dispute Resolution (a World Bank modular course) from the Ghana Institute of Management and Public Administration (GIMPA). In 2006 he enrolled at the Nottingham Law School, Nottingham Trent University in the United Kingdom, graduating in 2007 with an LL.M in Advanced Litigation and Dispute Resolution.

== Career ==
After graduating from the University of Ghana in 1977, Amegatcher worked as a national service personnel at the headquarters of the National Council on Women Development. After completing his national service in 1978, he took up a teaching job at Odorgonno Secondary School where he taught until 1980 when he joined the staff of the Accra Polytechnic teaching Commercial Law and General principles of English and Ghanaian Law until 1990. While teaching, Amegatcher doubled as a private legal practitioner at the Nana Sarpong Ahenkorah and Company Law firm from 1980 to 1989. He joined the Sam Okudzeto and Associates firm as a partner in 1989 and became a managing partner at the firm from 2005 to 2018. He was a chief examiner in Law for the West African Examination Council, Ghana Commercial Examinations from 1988 to 2004 and an external examiner in Law for polytechnics in Ghana. Amegatcher became secretary of the Greater Accra Bar Association from 1987 to 1989 and the assistant secretary of the Ghana Bar Association from 1993 to 1995. He also served as the secretary of the Ghana Illiteracy and Resources Foundation from 1994 to 2003 and the chair of the pupilage Committee of the Ghana Bar Association from 2002 until 2012. From 2009 to 2012, he was the chair of the World Vision Ghana Advisory Board and since 2011, he has been a West African representative for the Commonwealth Lawyers Association Council. He was the president of the Ghana Bar Association from 2012 to 2015. Amegatcher is a member of the Judicial Council and the General Legal Council, and has been the Advisory Council chair of the College of Humanities of the University of Ghana since 2015. He also served as the vice chair of the African Regional Forum for the International Bar Association (IBA) from 2015 to 2017 and chair of the African Regional Forum of the association from 2017 to 2018. He is currently chair of the African Regional Hub of the Commonwealth Lawyers Association. Prior to his appointment to the bench of the Supreme Court of Ghana, he had been a senior lecturer at the Ghana School of Law, teaching Advocacy and Legal Ethics, and other Alternative Dispute Resolution courses.

He was part of a seven-member panel constituted by the Chief Justice, that heard the 2020 election petition by John Mahama against the Electoral Commission of Ghana and Nana Akufo-Addo.

== Appointment ==
Amegatcher was nominated together with three other judges (Justice Agnes Dordzie, Justice Samuel Marful-Sau and Justice Nii Ashie Kotey) by the president of Ghana, Nana Akufo-Addo in 2018. He and Justice Agnes Dodzie were subsequently vetted on 24 August 2018, and were approved by parliament on 25 September 2018. He was sworn into office together with the other three nominated judges in October 2018.

== See also ==
- List of judges of the Supreme Court of Ghana
- Supreme Court of Ghana
