= Felicia Edem Attipoe =

First female aircraft marshaller in Ghana

Felicia Edem Attipoe is a Ghanaian female aircraft marshaller and the first woman in Ghana to hold this position. She is also known for having produced Key Soap Concert Party, a Ghanaian comedy show from the mid-1990s and early 2000s.

== Education ==
Attipoe received her secondary education at the OLA Senior High School in Ho, Volta Region. She continued her education at the African University College of Communications, where she earned a bachelor's degree in arts. She holds a degree in Photography from Temple University, Japan. She also holds certificates in Aerodrome Safety, Marshalling, and Radio Telephony from the Aviation School.

== Career ==
She was hired to work as a secretary at the Ghana Civil Aviation in 1999. After Ghana Civil Aviation was decoupled, she joined the Ghana Airports Company Limited and worked as a secretary for ten years. In 2011, she was transferred to the Ramp Manager's office as a secretary. Upon realizing there was very little she could do as a secretary and developing an interest in marshalling while watching men marshall the aircraft to the bay, she requested the director of the airport operations to let her work in that field. When the opportunity to be trained as a marshall arose, she applied and eventually was hired into the position. She was nominated as the Municipal Chief Executive(MCE) for the Tema West Municipal Assembly.

== Awards ==
2019—She won the Most Inspiring Woman in Aviation Industry, at the Maiden Ghana Most Inspiring Women's Award.

== Personal life ==
She has two children.
