= Nii Ashie Kotey =

Ghanaian judge (born 1953)

Justice Nii Ashie Kotey
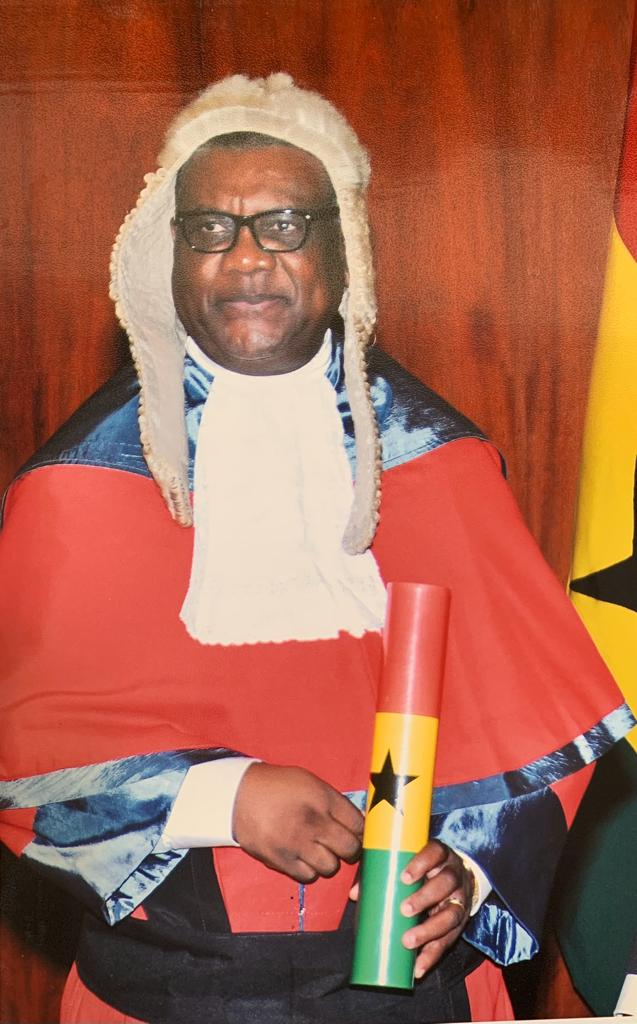
- Kotey in 2018

Justice of the Supreme Court of Ghana
- In office 3 October 2018 – 28 July 2023
- Nominated by: Nana Akufo-Addo

Personal details
- Born: 2 October 1953 (age 73) Osu, Accra, Ghana
- Education: University of Ghana; University of London; Ghana School of Law
- Profession: Academic; judge

Nii Ashie Kotey (born 2 October 1953) is a Ghanaian judge and academic. He served as a Justice of the Supreme Court of Ghana from 3 October 2018 until his retirement on 28 July 2023.

== Appointment ==
Kotey was nominated together with three other judges (Justice Agnes Dordzie, Justice Samuel Marful-Sau and Justice Nene Amegatcher) by the president of Ghana, Nana Akufo-Addo in 2018. He together with the three judges were recommended to the president by the three nominating bodies, the Chief Justice of Ghana, Attorney General of Ghana and the Ghana Bar Association. A letter was sent to the president by the then Chief Justice Sophia Akuffo on behalf of the Judicial Council to recommend the judges to the president. The president in March 2018 consulted the Council of State requesting their counsel as is required by law and approved the nominations based on the advice of the council. The names of the Judges were sent to parliament and he appeared before the Appointment's Committee of Parliament on Thursday, 23 August 2018. He together with the three other nominated judges were approved by parliament on 25 September 2018 and sworn into office in October 2018.

== Supreme Court ==
Since his elevation to the bench, Kotey has been involved in a number of important decisions. Significant among these are the landmark cases of Theophilus Donkor v. The Attorney-General (The Presidential Transitions case), Mayor Agbleze v. Attorney-General & Electoral Commission (The Creation of New Regions case) and National Democratic Congress v. Attorney-General & Electoral Commission; Mark Takyi-Banson v. Electoral Commission & Attorney-General (On the Right to Vote, Registration of Voters and Identification of Persons Applying to Register as Voters) in all of which he delivered the judgment of the court.

Other notable cases he has been involved in include; The Republic v. High Court, Accra; Ex parte Attorney-General (Exton Cubic, Interested Party) (The Bauxite Concession case), The Republic v. High Court, Accra; Ex parte Gregory Afoko (The Constitutionality of Nolle Prosequi case), Richard Korsah v. The Executive Director Economic and Organised Crime Office and Attorney-General (The Forfeiture and Seizure of Assets case) and Justice Abdulai v. The Attorney-General (The Determination of the Quorum of Parliament case).

In the area of Private Law, Kotey has delivered a number of significant decisions including Ecobank Ghana Limited v. Aluminium Industries Limited (On the Distinction Between the Tort of Negligence and Negligent Breach of Contract and the Consequences Flowing therefrom), Opanin Agyarkwa & Ors v. Folagin & Ors (On the Conditions on which it would be Unlawful for a Court to Set Aside its Judgment), Tieso Ghana Limited v. Euroget De-Investa SA (On the Primacy and Interpretation of Arbitration Clauses in Contracts) and Nii Stephen Maley Nai v. East Dadekotopon Development Trust (On Urbanisation and Land Use Change in Accra and Its Impacts on the Operation of the Doctrine of Estoppel). Justice Kotey was also a member of the seven-member panel that heard the Presidential Election Petition following the 2020 Presidential Election.

Kotey also serves on a number of committees. He is the Chair of the Board of the Judicial Training Institute, the Internship and Attachment Committee and the Quinquennial Leave Committee. He is also the Chair of the Independent Examinations Committee of the General Legal Council. Prior to his elevation to the bench, Kotey had spent over thirty-five years in teaching, research, consulting, legal practice and senior management.

== Academia & Career ==
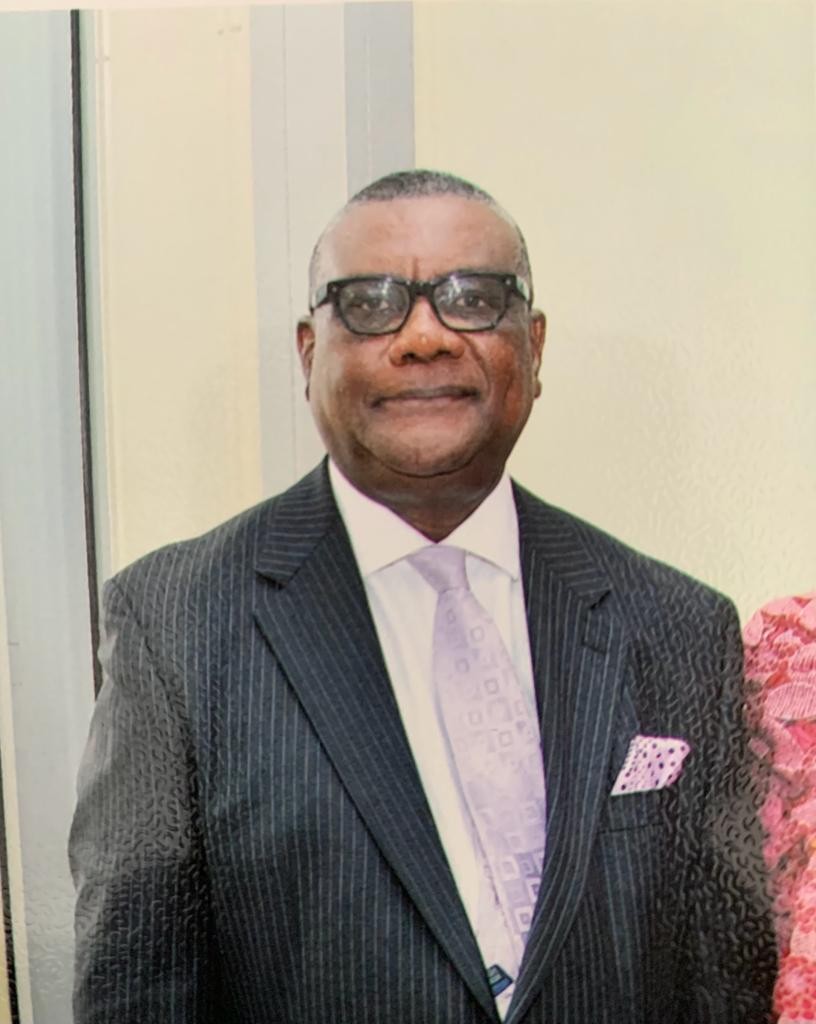

As an academic, Kotey's expertise were Natural Resources and Environmental Law, Human Rights Law and Constitutional Law. Kotey became a lecturer at the University of Ghana in 1981. While a lecturer at the university, he worked as a Solicitor and Advocate at Azinyo Chambers from 1982 to 2000. He was dean of the University of Ghana Faculty of Law from 2003 to 2007 and from 2005 to 2007 he served as the acting director of the Ghana School of Law. He was a visiting scholar to the Pritzker School of Law, Chicago from May to June 2001, a visiting professor of Human Rights and Democratization in Africa to the Center for Human Rights at the University of Pretoria from March to April 2001, a visiting scholar at the Queens University of Belfast, Northern Ireland, United Kingdom in March 2000 and at the faculty of law of the University of Leiden, Netherlands from August to September 1999, and a visiting professor at the College of Law, Stetson University, Florida USA in 1997.

In 2007, consistent with his firmly held belief that academic research and publication must be rooted in practical hands-on experience, he applied for and was appointed Chief Executive of the Ghana Forestry Commission through a competitive process. Prior to that, Kotey worked as a consultant at Kotey and Associates, a law firm from 2000 to 2007.

In 2021, Nii Ashie Kotey was sworn in by Rt. Reverend Professor Joseph Obiri Yeboah Mante, the Chancellor of the Presbyterian University College (PUCG) who is also the Moderator of the General Assembly of the Presbyterian Church of Ghana (PCG), as the Chairman of the 13-member Governing Council of the University College, a position he occupies till date.

== Publications ==
Amongst his articles and publications, these are a few notable ones:

- 2007 - With Bortei-Doku Aryeetey, et al., Legal and Institutional Issues in Land Policy Reform, ISSER Technical Publication No. 74, ISSER, University of Ghana, Legon.
- 2005 - With Dominic Ayine et al., Lifting the Lid on Foreign Investment Contracts: the Real Deal for Sustainable Development, Sustainable Markets Briefing Paper No. 1, September, 2005, International Institute of Environment and Development (IIED), London.
- 2004 - With Ellen Bortei-Doku Aryeetey, "Household Patterns and Conjugal Rights" in Akua Kuenyehia, (ed.) Women and Law in West Africa: Gender Relations in the Family - a West African Perspective. WaLWA, Accra. pp 71-80.
- 2003 - With Mark Owusu Yeboah, Peri-Urbanism, Land Relations and Women in Ghana. Access to Justice Series No. 1, Accra, Ghana.
- 2002 - Compulsory Acquisition of Land in Ghana: Does the 1992 Constitution Open New Vistas? in Toulon, C et al. (eds.)The Dynamics of Resources Tenure in West Africa. Oxford, James Curry/Heinemann. pp. 203-214.
- 2001 - With Kasim Kasanga. Land Management in Ghana: Building on Tradition and Modernity. International Institute for Environment and Development (IIED), London.
- 2000 - "The 1992 Constitution and Freedom of the Media" in Karikari K. and Kumado, K (eds.) The Law and the Media in Ghana, School of Communication Studies, University of Ghana, Legon. pp. 30-49 1998 - With Dzodzi Tsikata. "Women and Land Rights in Ghana", In Akua Kuenyahia, (ed.) Women and Law in West Africa: Situational Analysis of Some Key Issues Affecting Women. WaLWA, University of Ghana, Legon. pp 203-229.
- 1998 - Kotey et al. Falling into Place. Policies that Work for Forests and People Series No.4, International Institute for Environment and Development (IIED), London.
- 1997 - "Human Rights and Administrative Justice in Ghana under the Fourth Republic", in Costa, J-P and Canania G. (eds.) Human Rights and Public Administration, International Institute of Administrative Sciences (IIAS), Brussels, pp. 129-157.
- 1997 - With S. Bass, et al. "Policies Affecting Forests and People: Ten Elements that Work" (1997) Commonwealth Forestry Review 76(3), 186.
- 1996 - With J. Mayers et al. Incentives for Sustainable Forest Management: A Study in Ghana, IIED Forestry and Land Use Series No. 6, International Institute for Environment and Development (IIED), London.
- 1996 - With J. Mayers. Local Institutions and Adaptive Forest Management in Ghana, IIED Forestry and Land Use Series No. 7, International Institute for Environment and Development (IIED), London.
- 1995 - "Land and Tree Tenure and Rural Development Forestry in Northern Ghana", 91994-1995) 19 University of Ghana Law Journal, pp. 102-132.
- 1995 - "The Supreme Court and Conflict Resolution in the Fourth Republic", in M. Ocquaye (ed.) Democracy and Conflict Resolution in Ghana, Accra, Goldtype Publications, pp. 276-309.
- 1994 - With C. Sargent, et al. "Incentives for the Sustainable Management of the Tropical High Forest in Ghana" (1994) Commonwealth Forestry Review 73 (3), pp. 155-163.
- 1985 - "The African Charter on Human and People's Rights: An Exposition, Analysis and Critique", (1982-85) 16 University of Ghana Law Journal pp. 130-152

== Early and personal life ==
=== Early life ===
Nii Ashie Kotey was born on 2 October 1953 at Osu, a suburb of Accra. He began schooling in 1959 at the New Ghana International School in Osu but left in 1962 to attend the Presbyterian Primary School at Ada Foah. In 1964, he enrolled at the Presbyterian Middle Boarding School at Osu. He proceeded to St. Thomas Aquinas Senior High School in 1966, where he obtained his Ordinary Level ('O'-Level) certificate in 1971. He continued at Apam Senior High School that same year for his Advanced Level ('A'-Level) certificate which he received in 1973. In October 1973, he entered the University of Ghana to study law at bachelor's degree level. He graduated in June 1976 with his bachelor of laws degree. He proceeded to the United Kingdom to pursue a post graduate degree in law (LL.M) which he obtained from the University of London in 1977. He received his doctorate degree from the same university in 1981 and returned to Ghana that same year to enroll at the Ghana School of Law in Accra. He completed his studies in 1982 and was called to the bar in that same year.

=== Personal life ===
Nii Ashie Kotey is married with children. He is a Presbyterian and worships at the Ebenezer Presbyterian Church, Osu.

== See also ==
- List of judges of the Supreme Court of Ghana
- Supreme Court of Ghana
