= Samuel Marful-Sau =

Ghanaian lawyer and judge (1957–2021)

Justice Samuel Marful-Sau

Justice of the Supreme Court of Ghana
- In office 13 July 2018 – 10 August 2021
- Appointed by: Nana Akuffo-Addo

Appeal Court Judge
- In office November 2006 – 2018
- Nominated by: John Kufuor

High Court Judge
- In office June 2002 – November 2006
- President: John Kufuor

Personal details
- Born: 3 February 1957 Assin Adubiase, Gold Coast
- Died: 10 August 2021 (aged 64)
- Education: Breman Asikuma Senior High School; Navrongo Senior High School; University of Ghana; Ghana School of Law; University of Dundee
- Profession: Judge

Samuel Kofi Marful-Sau (3 February 1957 – 10 August 2021) was a Ghanaian judge. He was an active justice of the Supreme Court of Ghana.

Marful-Sau was born in Assin Adubiase in the Central Region. After qualifying as a Barrister-at-law in 1984 he worked at the office of the Provisional National Defence Council and entered private legal practice prior to being called to the High Court bench in June 2002. He subsequently became an Appeal Court judge in 2006 and in 2018 he was appointed justice of the Supreme Court of Ghana.

He was nominated in 2018 by the president Nana Akufo-Addo in consultation with Council of State and the advice of the Judicial Council.

== Early life and education ==
Marful-Sau was born on 3 February 1956 at Assin Edubiase in the Assin South District of the Central Region.

He began his formal education at Methodist Primary School in Assin Edubiase from 1963 to 1965. He continued his elementary education at Sempe '1' Primary and Middle School in Accra from 1965 to 1969, he later enrolled at the Urban Council Middle 'A' School at Mankessim where he studied from 1969 to 1972. His secondary school education began at Assin Manso Secondary School, Assin Manso, he later moved to Feden High School where he studied from September 1973 to June 1974. He later enrolled at Breman Asikuma Secondary School in September 1974. There, he received his Ordinary Level ('O'-Level) certificate in June 1977. He proceeded to Navrongo Secondary School in September 1977 and obtained his Advanced Level ('A'-Level) certificate there in June 1979. He entered the University of Ghana in August 1979 and graduated with his Bachelor of Laws degree in July 1982. He continued at the Ghana School of Law where he received his Barrister-at-Law in 1984. In September 2008 he entered the University of Dundee, Dundee, Scotland to pursue a Master's degree (LL.M.) in Petroleum Law and Policy. He graduated in October 2009.

== Career ==
Marful-Sau was admitted to practice in Ghana as a Barrister-at-Law and Solicitor in 1984. He began his career as a national service personnel working in the capacity of a Legal Assistant at the Castle Information Bureau Office of the Provisional National Defence Council (PNDC) and briefly as a prosecutor in the office of the Special Public Prosecutor from August 1984 to July 1986. During the period of his national service, he was selected to study a six-month course in Intelligence Studies at the Security and Intelligence Academy in Moscow, Russia. In July 1986, he was attached to the office of the PNDC, he remained there until September 1987. A month later, Marful-Sau joined Vidal. L. Buckle and Company as a private legal practitioner. While in private practice, his areas of expertise included: Nationality, Immigration, Corporate, Commercial and Insurance Law. He remained in private legal practice until June 2002 when he was called to the bench as a judge of the High Court. While in private legal practice, Marful-Sau was a member of the Law Reform Commission from August 1998 to October 2005 and a member of the Ghana Frequency Regulation Control Board from 1993 to 1998. He rose through the ranks as a justice of the high court to a justice of the appeal court, serving in that capacity from November 2006 to 2018 when he was appointed justice of the Supreme Court of Ghana.

== Appointment ==
Marful-Sau was nominated together with three other judges (Justice Agnes Dordzie, Justice Professor Nii Ashie Kotey and Justice Nene Amegatcher) by the president of Ghana, Nana Akufo-Addo in 2018. After the names of the nominated judges were sent to parliament, there were claims that his appointment and the appointment of Justice Agnes Dordzie were rewards and not justified as their promotions occurred after they (Justice Samuel Marful-Sau and Justice Agnes Dordzie) recommended that the Electoral Commission Chair, Mrs. Charlotte Osei be removed from office. The government, however, dismissed these claims claiming the nominations were in consultation with the Council of State and based on the advice of the Judicial Council.

He was part of a seven-member panel that will be hearing the 2020 election petition by John Mahama against The Electoral Commission of Ghana and Nana Akufo-Addo.

== Publication ==
- A Practical Guide to Civil Procedure in Ghana (2017)

== Death ==
Samuel Marful-Sau died on 10 August 2021 at the Ga East Hospital after a short illness. He was 64 years old.

== See also ==
- List of justices of the Supreme Court of Ghana
