= OLA Girls Senior High School (Ho) =

Our Lady of Apostles Girls Senior High School

Location
- Market Road, Ola, Ho; Volta Region; Ho; Ghana; 6°37′11″N 0°28′01″E

Information
- Other name: OLA Girls Senior High School
- School type: All-girls
- Motto: Vitam Praesta Puram
- Founder: Bishop Anthony Konings
- School district: Ho
- Oversight: Ministry of Education
- Head of school: Benedicta A. Afesi
- Gender: Girls
- Classes offered: Home Economics, General Science, General Arts, Visual Arts, Business

Our Lady of Apostles Girls Senior High School is an all female second cycle institution in Ho in the Volta Region of Ghana.

== History ==
OLA Girls Senior High School was established on February 1, 1954 by Bishop Anthony Konings in Keta with 35 students. The school started from the borrowed premises of the convent boarding school for girls and the nearby middle school building which was converted into classrooms, dining hall and a dormitory block.

== Programs offered ==
- General Science
- Home Economics
- General Arts
- Business
- Visual Arts

== Vision ==
Providing quality and holistic education for academic and moral excellence in a disciplined school environment through technology.

== Headmistresses ==
- Sr. Theodorus Fahy (1954–1976)
- Sr. Marie O’Driscoll (1976–1982)
- Sr. Mary Connaughton (1982–1983)
- Ms. Loretta MacCarthy (1983–1985)
- Sr. Regina Kampo, the first Ghanaian OLA Sister to head the school (1985–1997)
- Sr. Bernadette Kofitse (1997–1999)
- Mrs. Philomena Afeti (1999 – June 2010)
- Mrs. Benedicta A. Afesi (August 2010 – 2017)

== Notable alumni ==
- Bernice Adiku-Heloo, MP Hohoe North and Deputy Minister Environment Science, Technology and Innovations
- Sefadzi Abena Amesu (popularly known as S3fa), afrobeats / afro pop musician
- Felicia Edem Attipoe, aircraft marshal
- Juliana Azumah-Mensah, MP and former Minister of State
- Gina Blay, Ghana's ambassador to Germany
- Mama Bobi III, queen-mother of Bake-Ho Bankoe
- Kafui Danku, actress, movie producer and writer
- Agnes Dordzie, justice of the Supreme Court of Ghana (2018–2022)
- Audrey Gadzekpo, media practitioner and female dean of the School of Information and Communications Studies at the University of Ghana
- Afi Kpodo, Ghanaian actress and entrepreneur
- Theresa Kufuor, former First Lady of Ghana
- Peace Adzo Medie, writer
- Harriet Sena Siaw-Boateng, Ghana's Permanent Representative to the European Union (2019–)
