= Volta Regional Museum =

- Musée régional de la Volta
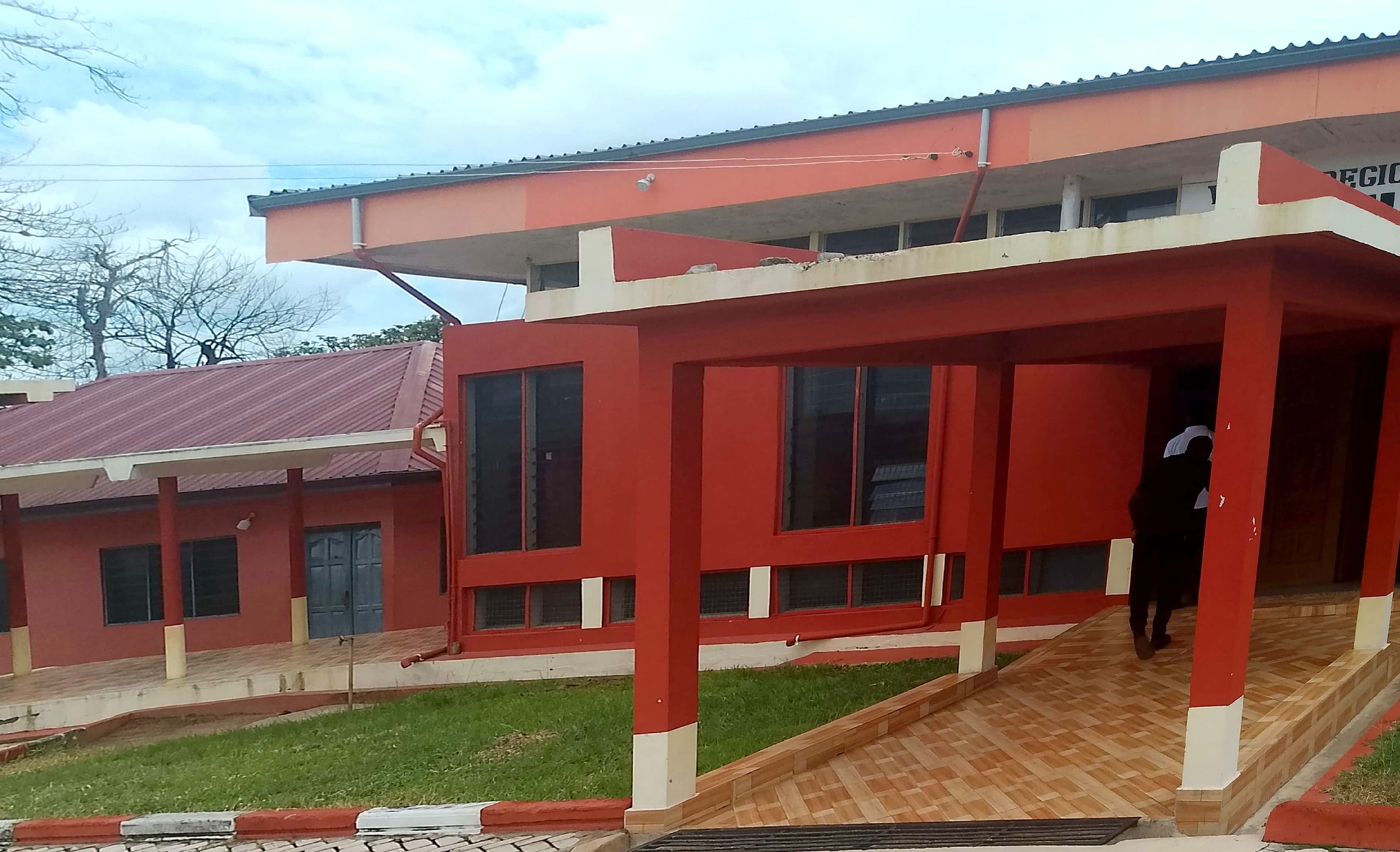
- Volta Regional Museum, Ho Ghana

- Location in Ghana
- Established: 1973
- Location: 43 Glala Road, P. O. Box 43, Ho, Ghana
- Coordinates: 6.608611°N 0.468889°E
- Type: Ethnographic museum
- Collections: Paintings, woodcraft, and potter,
- Website: Official website

The Volta Regional Museum is a museum in Ho, Ghana. The museum is dedicated to the history and traditions of the Volta Region. The museum is administered by the Ghana Museums and Monuments Board.

== History ==
Before it was used as a museum, the building served as the Office of the Regional House of Chiefs. The building was sold to the government in 1967 and the museum was opened in 1973. In April 2014, the museum collaborated with Evangelical Presbyterian University College to hold the first memorial lecture to pay tribute to several contributors who have dedicated themselves to the study of the Ewe language, these contributors were Ghanaian doctors; Godfred Kportufe Agamah and Emmanuel Ablo, in addition to Professor Komla Amoaku, and the lecture also paid tribute to German Reverend Jakob Spieth. In 2018, Germany's ambassador to Ghana, Christoph Retzlaff, visited the museum and spoke about plans to rehabilitate sites in the Volta region. In 2021, renovations were completed to the museum which was partly financed by the German government who gave 25000 euros and Ghana Museums and Monuments Board who contributed 200000 Ghanaian cedi. The museum renovations lasted 3 years. On September 4, 2021, an event on tourism development in the region was organized by Tourism Aid Ghana at the museum.

== Collections ==
Exhibits on display at the museum include the Chair of State of the last German colonial governor, woodcraft, pottery, Kente textiles, masks and Asante shrines.

Exhibits in Volta Regional Museum

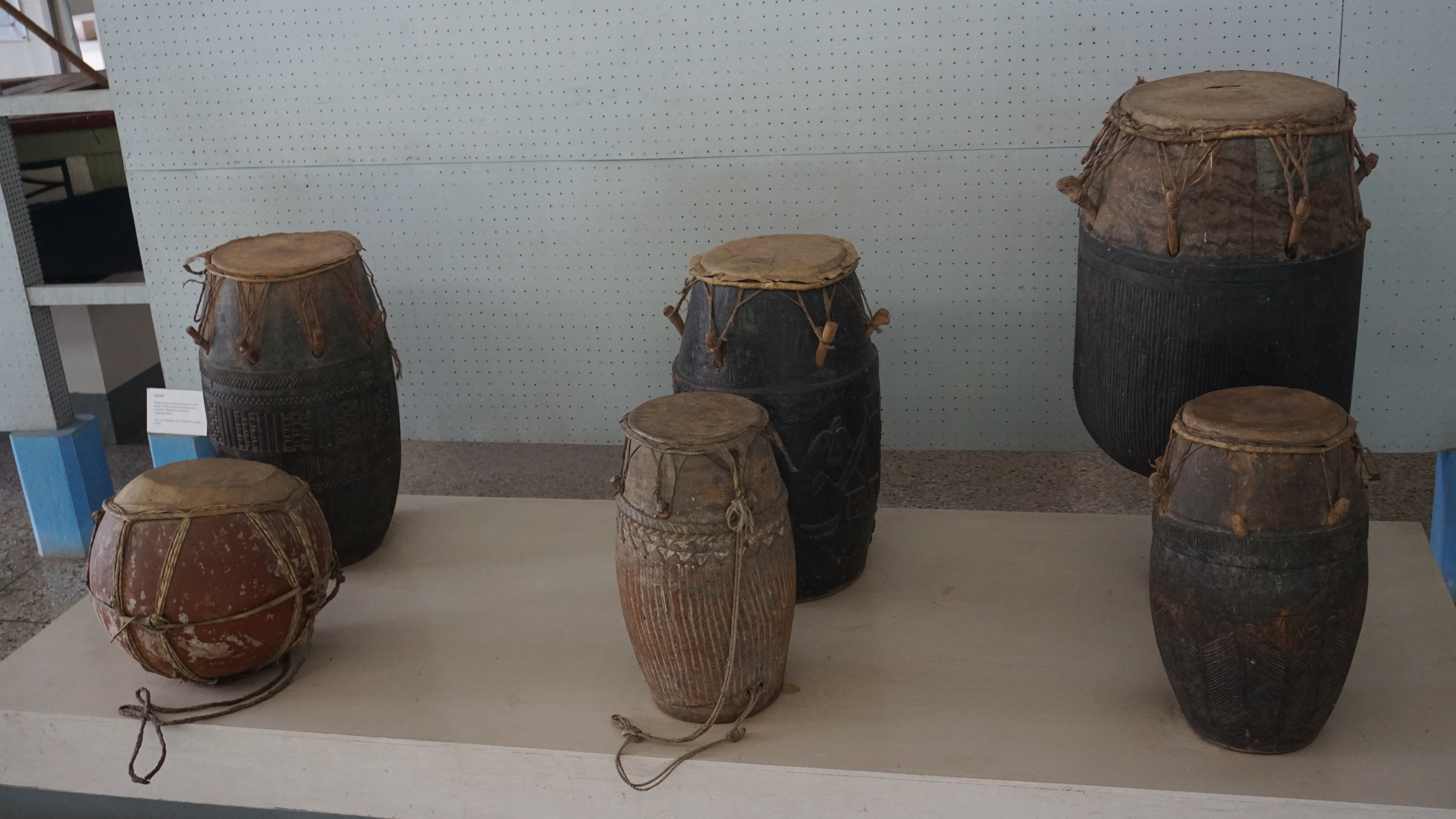
Drums in the museum

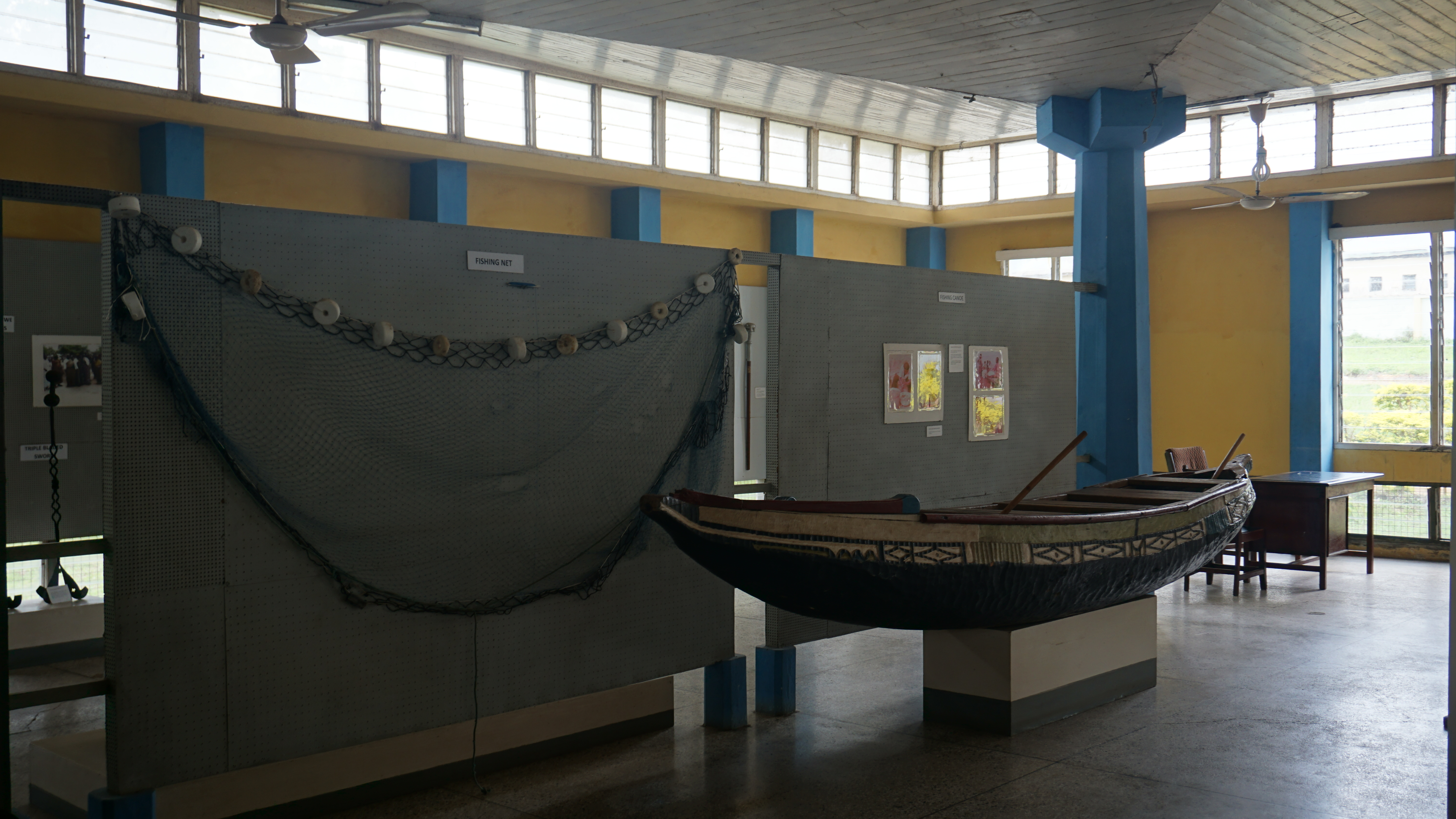
A canoe and net at the museum

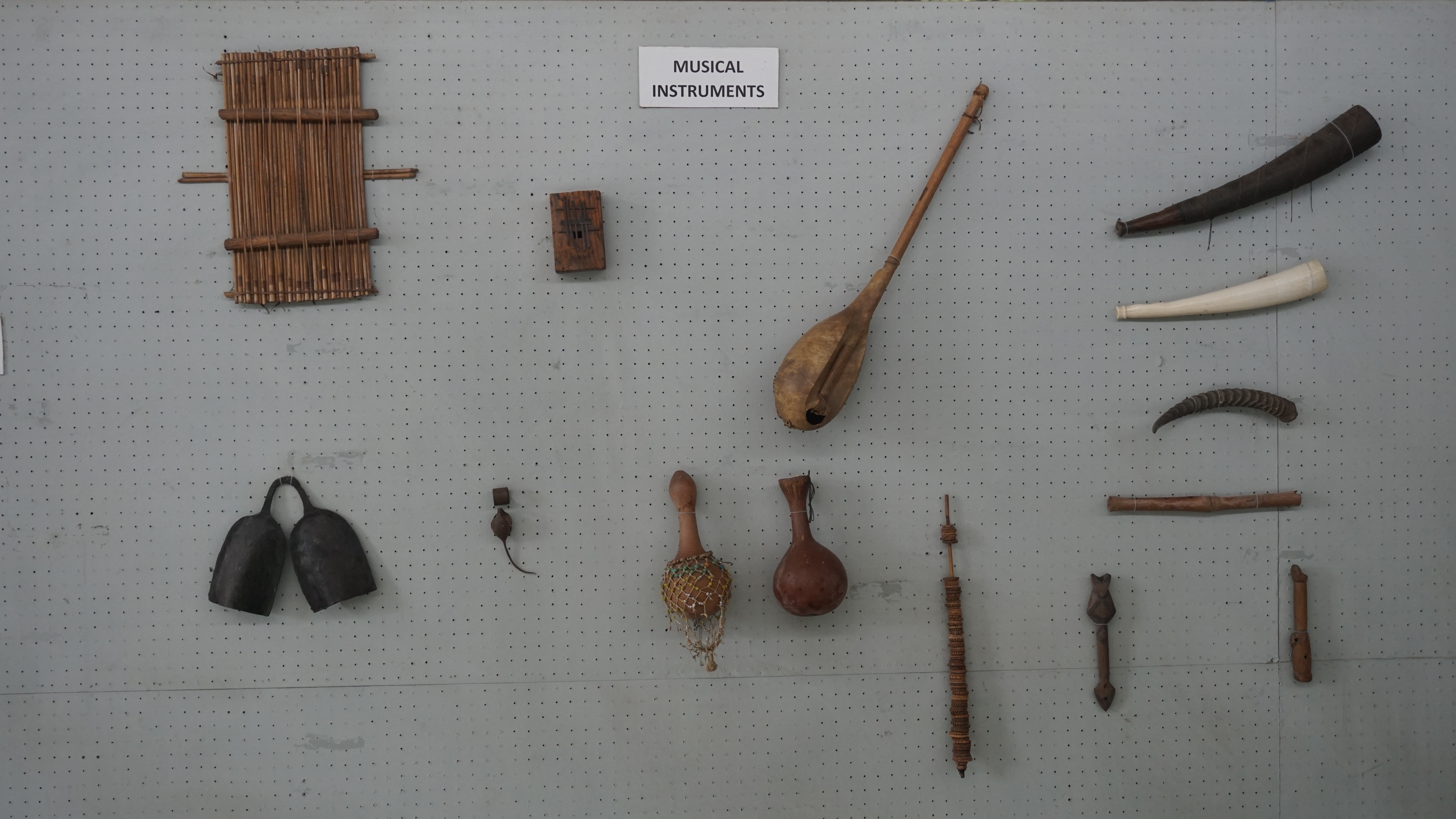
Musical instruments in the museum

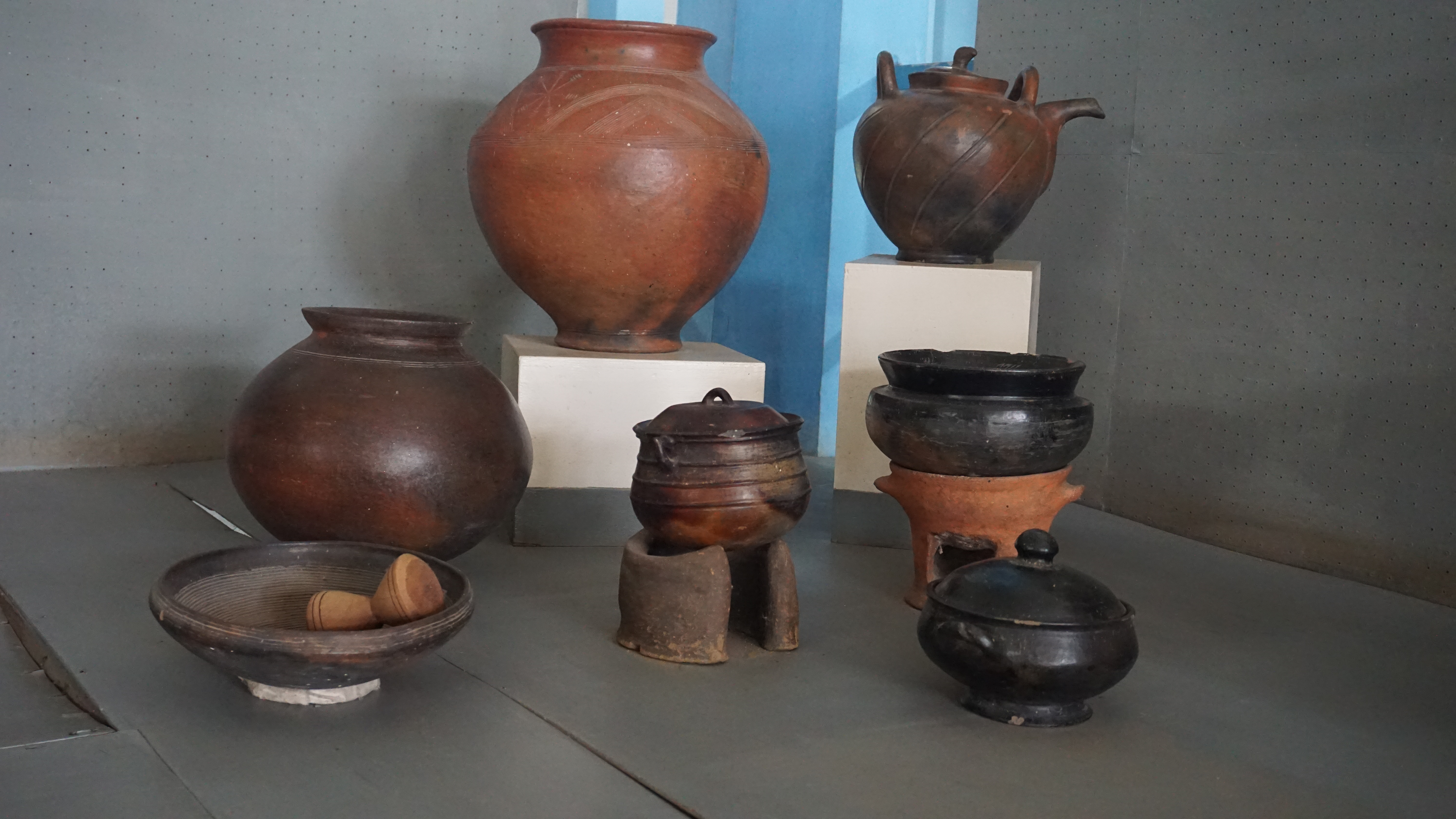
Pots in the museum

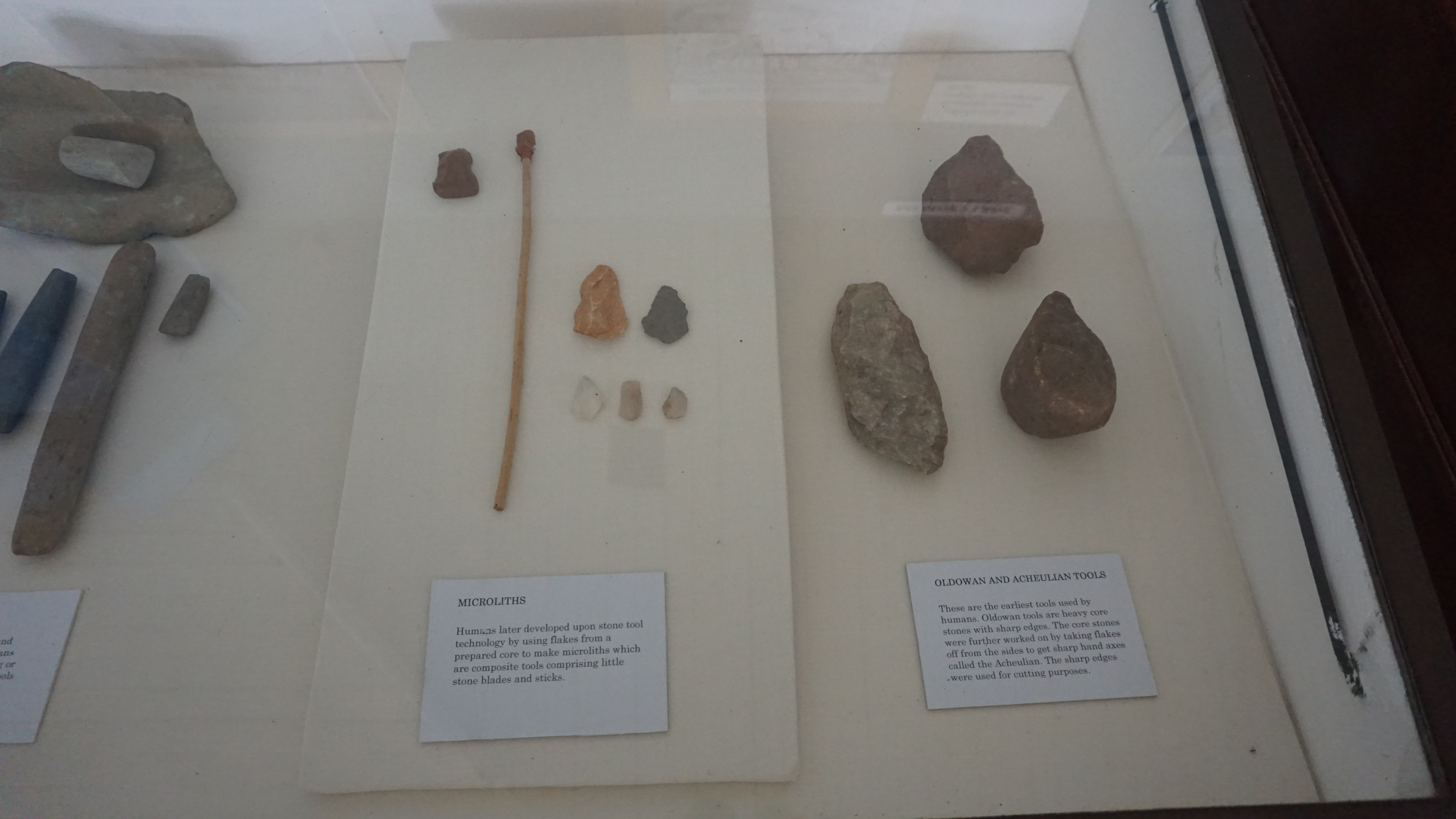
Artifacts from Volta Region Museum

The museum contains exhibits on ethnography of the Volta Region as well as collections of handicrafts and contemporary art. The museum also has exhibits from when the region was part of German Togoland, as well as artifacts from when the British colonized the region and local culture. The museum has several collections of cultural artifacts including swords, stone relics, musical instruments such as drums, maps of the Ewe State, stools and earthenware cooking vessels. In addition, the museum contains paintings and sculptures by artists from the Volta region.
