= Togbe Afede XIV =

Ghanaian traditional ruler

- Togbe
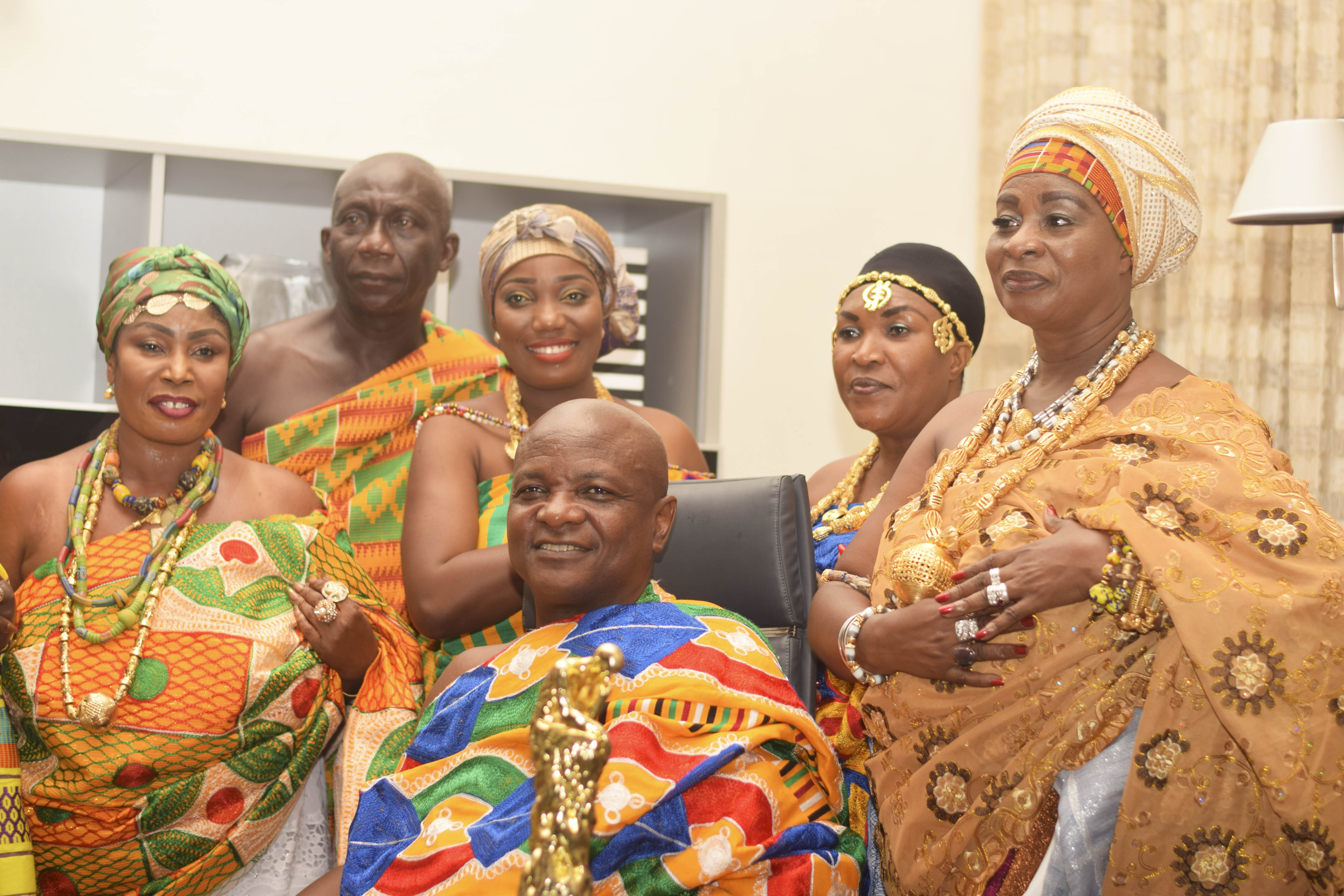
- Agbogbomefia of Asogli State
- Reign: October 4, 2003 – present
- Coronation: October 4, 2003
- Predecessor: Togbe Afede Asor II
- Born: 23 April 1957 (age 69); Ho, Volta Region, Dominion of Ghana
- Father: Cpl. Patrick Akpo
- Mother: Madam Rose Anyawoe
- Occupation: Investment Banker

Togbe Afede XIV (23 April 1957) is the Agbogbomefia of the Asogli State, President of Asogli Traditional Area, and former president of the National House of Chiefs.

== Early life and education ==
Togbe Afede XIV was born in Ho on 23 April 1957 to Corporal Patrick Akpo and Madam Rose Anyawoe. His twin brother, Philip, died at a young age.

He began his education at Ho Bankoe Roman Catholic Boys School in 1961 and then entered Kpedze Secondary School in 1969, successfully completing his GCE “O” Level in 1974. He then proceeded to Labone Secondary School in Accra where he excelled in the GCE “A” Level examination in 1976.

Togbe Afede XIV is an alumnus of University of Ghana where he obtained a Bachelor of Business Administration qualification in Accounting in 1979. He also holds an MBA from the Yale School of Management in 1989.

== Career ==
Togbe is the executive chairman of World Trade Centre Accra and was voted member of the board of directors of the World Trade Centre in 2015. Togbe founded SAS Finance Group Ltd, constituting Strategic African Securities Ltd, a stock brokerage and corporate finance advisory firm, and SAS Investment Management Ltd, an asset management firm. He also founded Strategic Initiatives Ltd (SIL) a portfolio and private equity investment firm, and co-founded Sunon Asogli Power Ghana Ltd, Databank Financial Services and Africa World Airlines Ltd.

He is also a co-pilot of the Embraer 145 aircraft of Africa World Airlines which he piloted for the first landing at Ho Airport in April 2021.

== Board memberships ==
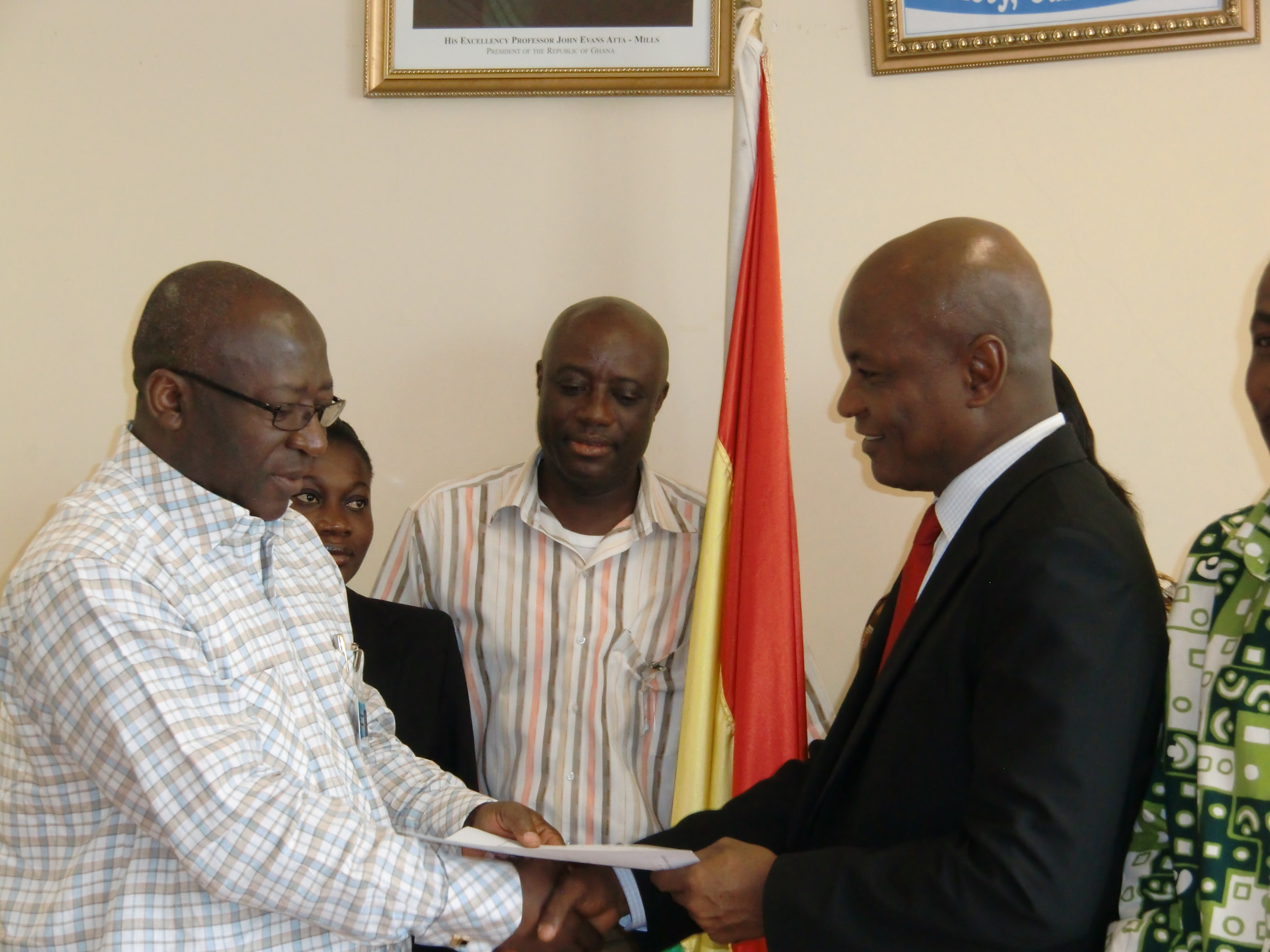
Togbe Afede XIV receives the Air Carrier License from GCAA on behalf of Africa World Airlines in 2011

Title	Company	Tenure
Board Member	World Trade Centers Association	2015–Present
Chairman	Pioneer Kitchenware Ltd	2006–Present
Chairman	Accra Hearts of Oak FC Ltd	2011–Present
Co-chairman	Africa World Airlines	2010–Present
Chairman	National Investment Bank	2017-2019
Board Member	Bank of Ghana	2003-2013
Board Member	Aluworks Ghana Ltd	2002–Present
Board Member	Ensign Global College	2014–Present

== Awards and recognitions ==
- Personality of the Year, 2005 Millennium Excellence Awards, Ghana.
- Order of the Volta (2008).
- Chieftaincy Leadership, 2010 Millennium Excellence Awards, Ghana.
- Golden Image Awards 2011, for Peace Development Initiatives.
- Ultimate Man of the Year, 2018 Exclusive Men of the Year Awards.
- Entrepreneur of the Decade, 2020 Ghana Entrepreneurs and Corporate Executive Awards.
