= Peace Adzo Medie =

Ghanaian academic

Peace Adzo Medie is a Liberian-born Ghanaian academic and writer of both fiction and nonfiction. Her scholarship focuses on gender, politics, and armed conflict, and her published works of fiction explore similar themes.

== Early life and education ==
Medie was born in Liberia, where her parents worked. Before the age of ten, her family relocated due to armed conflict in Liberia and moved to Ho in southern Ghana, where she attended OLA Girls Senior High School. Medie has stated that her family was comfortable in Liberia before being forced to move, and that after returning to Ghana she began to take notice of the differences between the lives of herself, her family, and her friends depending on their household's social class.

In 2003, Medie earned a Bachelor of Arts degree in Geography and Resource Development from the University of Ghana in Accra. She then completed her postgraduate studies in the United States, obtaining a Master of Arts degree in International Studies from Ohio University in Athens in 2006 and a Doctor of Philosophy degree in Public and International Affairs from the University of Pittsburgh in Pennsylvania in 2012.

== Career ==
=== Academic career ===
Medie was awarded the 2012–2013 African Affairs African Author Prize for her article Fighting gender-based violence: The women's movement and the enforcement of rape law in Liberia in the journal African Affairs, an African Studies journal. From 2013 to 2018, she worked as a research fellow at the University of Ghana in the Legon Centre for International Affairs and Diplomacy. She served as an Oxford-Princeton Global Leaders Fellow at the University of Oxford in England from 2015 to 2016, and as a postdoctoral research fellow in the Niehaus Centre for Globalization and Governance at the Woodrow Wilson School of Public and International Affairs of Princeton University in New Jersey from 2016 to 2017. Medie has won several awards for her academic work, including the 2019 Best Article Award of the European Journal of Politics and Gender.

Medie moved to Bristol in 2019 to become a Senior Lecturer in Gender and International Politics at the School of Sociology, Politics, and International Studies (SPAIS) of the University of Bristol in the United Kingdom, and in 2022 became an Associate Professor in Politics.

In 2020, Medie published her first book, the scholarly work Global Norms and Location Action: The Campaigns to End Violence Against Women in Africa. It deals with post-conflict states' responses to violence against women.

She was a co-editor of African Affairs, and is now on the journal's editorial advisory board. She is on the editorial board of the journal Politics & Gender.

Medie discusses women's rights, feminism, politics, and violence against women at international panels held by the African Union and universities of the United Nations.

=== Fiction writing ===
In addition to her academic work, Medie is a published fiction writer. She has produced several works of short fiction that focus on friendship and love in the lives of varying female characters. In 2020, she published her debut novel, His Only Wife. It deals with the struggles of modern marriage in Ghana, the influences of culture on women's lives, and the interconnecting lives of three women, Afi, Evelyn, and Muna. It was described as "A Cinderella story set in Ghana" by Kirkus.

His Only Wife was well received, appearing on several lists of best new releases, including the New York Times' Staff Picks. In 2021, she was named "Best Author" by the Ghanaian news station Citi TV at its annual Entertainment Achievement Awards.

Her second novel, Nightbloom, which follows two cousins along divergent but parallel paths on both sides of the Atlantic, was released in 2023. The following year, it was longlisted for the Women's Prize for Fiction. Medie has stated that her desire to explore the influence women's families can have on them as individuals, as well as what happens when pressure from family causes an individual to put aside their own desires to meet familial expectations, was a part of her inspiration for Nightbloom.

Medie describes her fiction as being heavily influenced by her academic research into gender, violence, and politics.

== Selected works ==
- Medie, Peace A. (2020). Global Norms and Local Action: The Campaigns to End Violence Against Women in Africa. Oxford University Press. ISBN 978-0-19-092296-2. (non-fiction)
- Medie, Peace Adzo (September 2020). His Only Wife. Algonquin Books. ISBN 978-1-64375-111-5. (fiction)
- Medie, Peace Adzo (2023). NightBloom.
