= Kafui Danku =

Ghanaian actress and movie producer

- Born: August 16, 1983 (age 43)
- Citizenship: Ghanaian
- Education: University of Cape Coast
- Occupations: Ghanaian Actress and movie producer
- Known for: Alvina: Thunder and Lightning; I Do; 4Play.
- Children: 2

Kafui Danku (born August 16, 1982) is a Ghanaian actress and movie producer, mostly known for her role in movies such as Any Other Monday, Alvina: Thunder and Lightning, I Do, and 4Play. She is also the author of the book Silence Is Not Golden.

== Early life and education ==
Kafui grew up in Ho, but her hometown is Tanyigbe-Etoe, a town in the Volta Region of Ghana. She had her basic education at the Mawuli Primary and JSS. She further attended Ola Girls School in the Volta Region of Ghana, and continued her education at the University of Cape Coast in the Central Region of Ghana where she studied a Bachelor of Arts in English.

== Career ==
Kafui began her professional acting career at the United Nations before she entered the Ghana Movie Industry in 2009. She is also an advocate, a Vlogger and former beauty queen. She participated in Miss Ghana 2004, where she became a finalist, and in Miss Greater Accra 2004 where she won the pageant. She is the co-owner of ABC Limited (ABC Pictures GH), a film production company in Ghana. Her first movie in the Ghana movie industry is Agony of the Christ, with casts like Majid Michel and Nadia Buari. In 2025, she was appointed as the Executive Secretary of the National Film Authority (NFA).

In 2025 she was appointed as the head of Ghana National Film Authority (NFA).

== Personal life ==
Danku married a Canadian man, Kojo Pitcher in 2011. They have two children; Lorde Ivan Pitcher and Titan Pitcher. Danku has two siblings. Her parents are Madam Agnes Asigbey (a retired nurse) and the late John Danku.

In May 2018, she launched a project called 'Ghana Power Kids Charity Ball' to help children at the Kwashiorkor Unit of the Princess Marie Louise Children's Hospital in Accra.
