= Asorgli State =

Place in Volta Region, Ghana

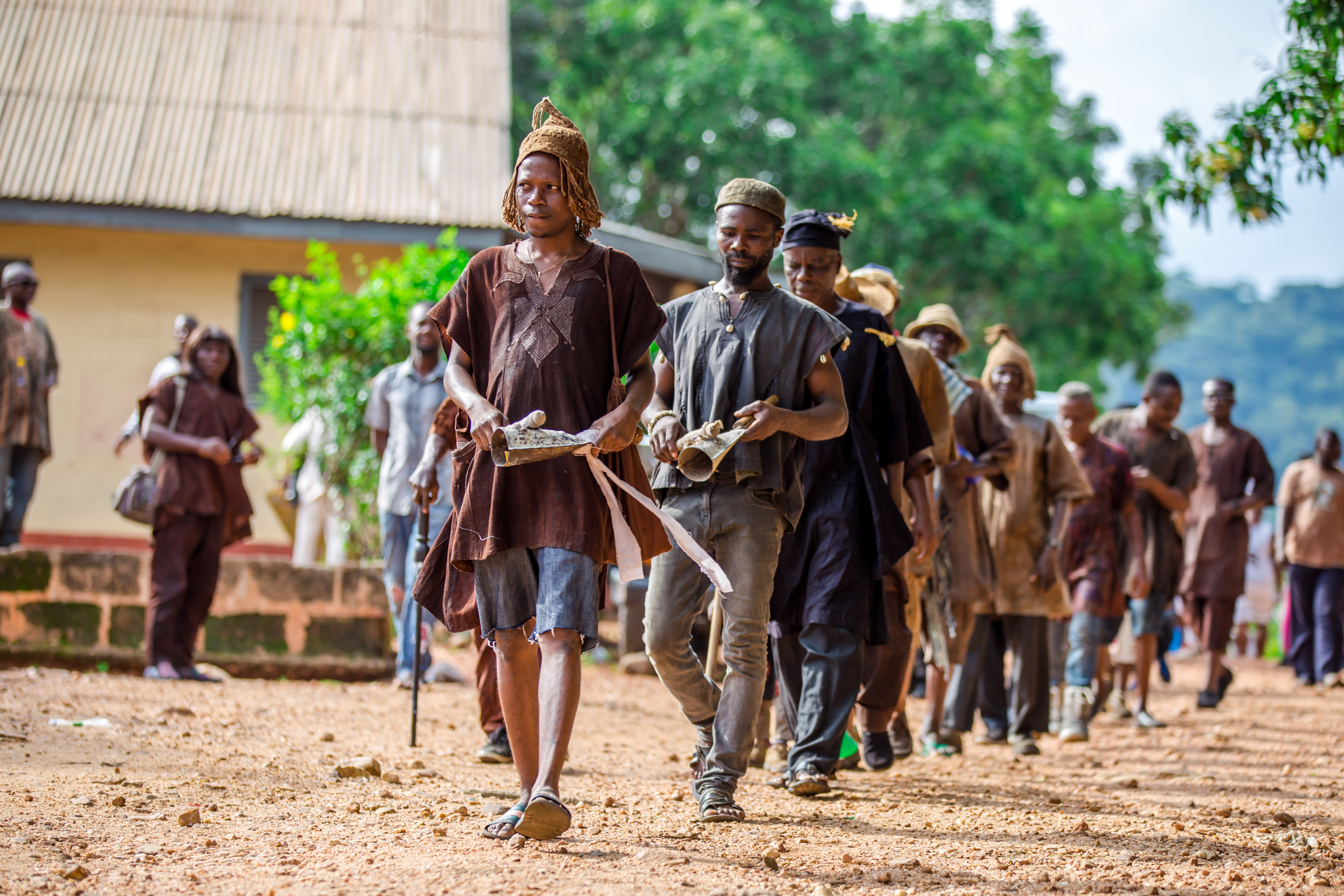
The Asorgli State hails the New Yam.

The Asorgli State (French: État d'Asorgli) is a traditional area in the Volta Region of Ghana. It covers an area from Atimpoko in the west through Ho, to Aflao in the east. The traditional area has several Paramount Chiefs who swear allegiance to the Agbogbomefia - King of the Asɔgli State.

The current Agbogbomefia of the Asorgli State and President of Asogli Traditional Area is Togbe Afede XIV who is also a former President of the National House of Chiefs.
