= Ho Technical University =

Public technical university school in Ho, Ghana

- Université technique de Ho; Ho Mɔ̃ɖaŋununya Yunivɛsiti

Location
- P.O. Box HP 217, Ho; Ho; Volta Region; Ho, Ghana; Ghana; 6°35′26.5″N 0°28′08.3″E

Information
- Type: Public Technical University
- Motto: Adanu Nazu Kekeli
- Established: 1968; 58 years ago
- Status: Active
- School district: Ho Municipal District
- Category: Tertiary Institution
- Chairperson: Prof. Emmanuel James Flolu
- Rector: Prof Ben. Q. Honyenuga
- Staff: http://hopoly.edu.gh/staff/
- Slogan: Adanu Nazu kekeli
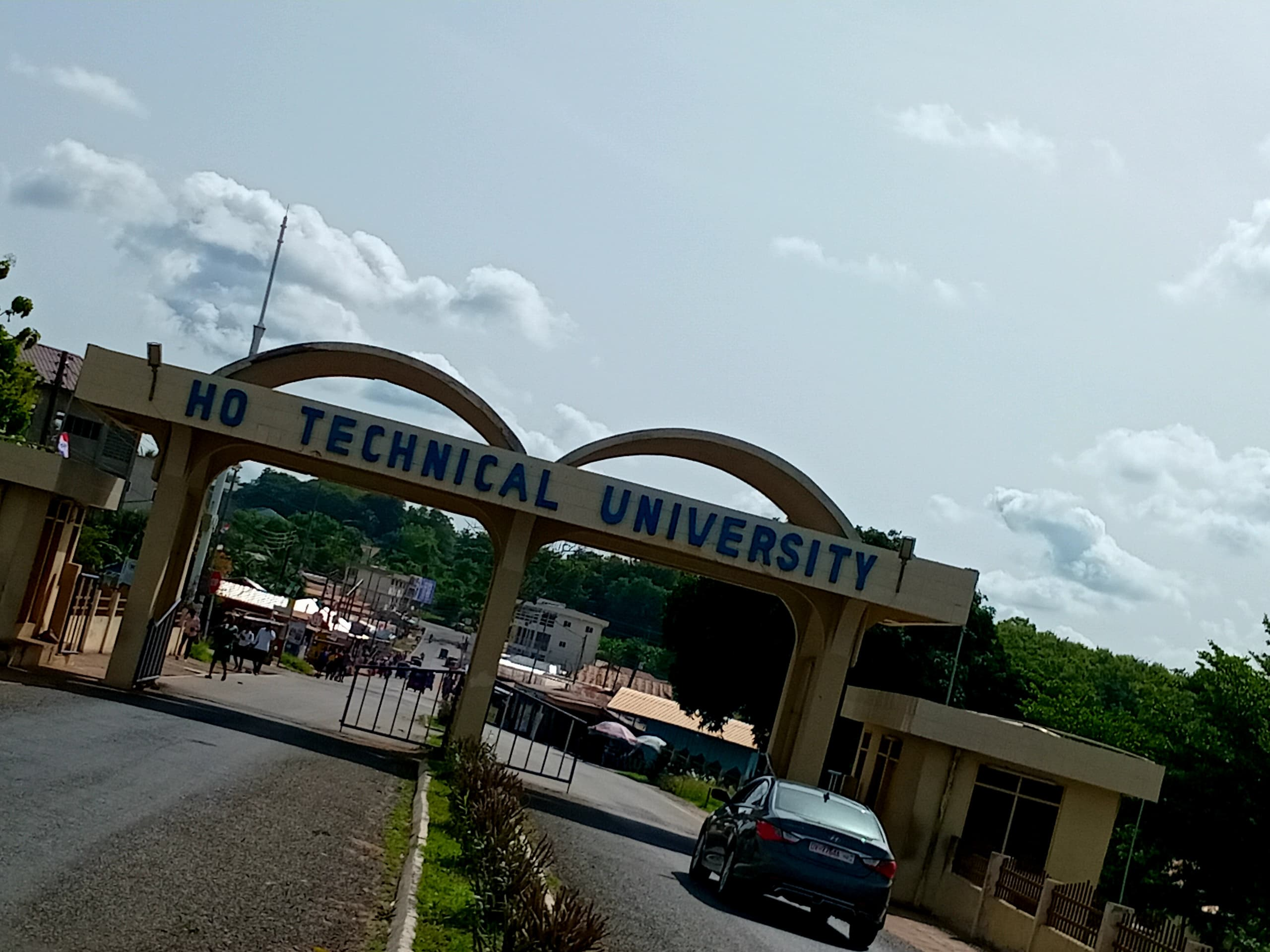

Ho Technical University, formerly Ho Polytechnic, is a public tertiary institution in the Volta Region of Ghana. The Polytechnic started in 1968 as a technical institute with the primary goal of providing pre-technical education. By 1972, the Institute made tremendous progress and upgraded its courses. In 1986, the institution was upgraded into a Polytechnic. However, it was not until 1993 that it got full backing of the law (Polytechnic Law 321) to become a fully-fledged tertiary institution, charged with the responsibility of training students to the Higher National Diploma (HND) and Degree Levels. The Polytechnic Law (PNDC Law 321) was replaced in September 2007 by the Polytechnics Act (Act 745). Ho Technical University is one of the premier national tertiary institutions in the Volta Region. The Motto of the University is Adanu Nazu kekeli which means Adanu become light.

== Strategic Plan ==
The University has its antecedents in the former Ho Technical Institute, which was established in 1968 to provide pre-technical training courses in various engineering and building trades. In 1972, the pre-technical courses were upgraded to more advanced programmes in technical, business and other vocational disciplines.

Though the Technical Institute was re-designated a Polytechnic in 1986, it was not until 1993 that it got the full backing of the law (PNDC Law 321 as amended by ACT 745) to become a tertiary institution with statutory objectives and functions.

== Academic ==
The University offers Master of Technology (MTech) Programmes, Bachelor of Technology (BTech) Programmes, Higher National Diploma (HND) and Non-Tertiary Programmes.

Master of Technology (MTech) Programmes are affiliated to the Kwame Nkrumah University of Science and Technology (KNUST) on sandwich basis. The programme is run for over a period of two (2) academic sessions.

== Faculties and Programmes ==
Ho Technical University has five faculties and they are listed below.

=== Applied Sciences and Technology ===
1. Bachelor of Technology, Hospitality Tourism Management
2. Bachelor of Technology, Food Technology
3. Bachelor of Technology, Tourism, Leisure and Events Management
4. Bachelor of Technology, Information and Communication Technology
5. Bachelor of Technology, Agro Enterprise Development
6. Bachelor of Technology, Statistics and Finance
7. Bachelor of Technology, Computer Science

=== Engineering ===
1. Bachelor of Technology, Electrical and Electronic Engineering
2. Bachelor of Technology, Automobile Engineering
3. Bachelor of Technology, Agricultural and Environmental Engineering
4. Bachelor of Technology, Civil Engineering
5. Bachelor of Technology, Agricultural Engineering

=== Built and Natural Environment ===
1. Bachelor of Technology, Building Technology

=== Art and Design ===
1. Bachelor of Technology, Fashion Design and Textiles
2. Bachelor of Technology, Industrial Art (Specializations: Sculpture, Painting, Graphic Design, Ceramics, Textiles)

=== Business ===
1. Bachelor of Accounting and Taxation
2. Bachelor of Marketing and Information Technology
3. Bachelor of Procurement and Supply Chain Management
4. Bachelor of Secretaryship and Management Studies

=== Higher National Diploma (HND) Programmes ===
==== Engineering ====
1. HND Agricultural Engineering
2. HND Mechanical Engineering (Automobile)
3. HND Mechanical Engineering (Production)
4. HND Building Technology
5. HND Civil Engineering
6. HND Electrical and Electronic Engineering

==== Built and Natural Environment ====
1. HND Building Technology

==== Applied Sciences and Technology ====
1. HND Food Technology
2. HND Hotel, Catering and Institutional Management
3. HND Statistics
4. HND Agro Enterprise Development
5. HND Computer Science
6. HND Information and Communication Technology

==== Art and Design ====
1. HND Fashion Design and Textiles
2. HND Industrial Art (Options: Sculpture, Painting, Graphic Design, Ceramics, Textiles)

==== Business School ====
1. HND Accountancy
2. HND Marketing
3. HND Secretaryship and Management Studies
4. HND Banking and Finance
5. HND Purchasing and Supply

=== Non-Tertiary Programmes ===
1. Advanced Fashion
2. Motor Vehicle Technician (MVT) Part I &II
3. Agric Engineering Technician Part I & II
4. Construction Technician Certificate Part I (CTC I)
5. Construction Technician Certificate Part II (CTC II)
6. Certificate II in Catering
7. Diploma in Business Studies(Accounting, Secretarial, Marketing, and Statistics Options).
8. EE Technician Part I, II &II
9. Pre-HND Access Course for Technical/Vocational School Graduates

== Gallery ==
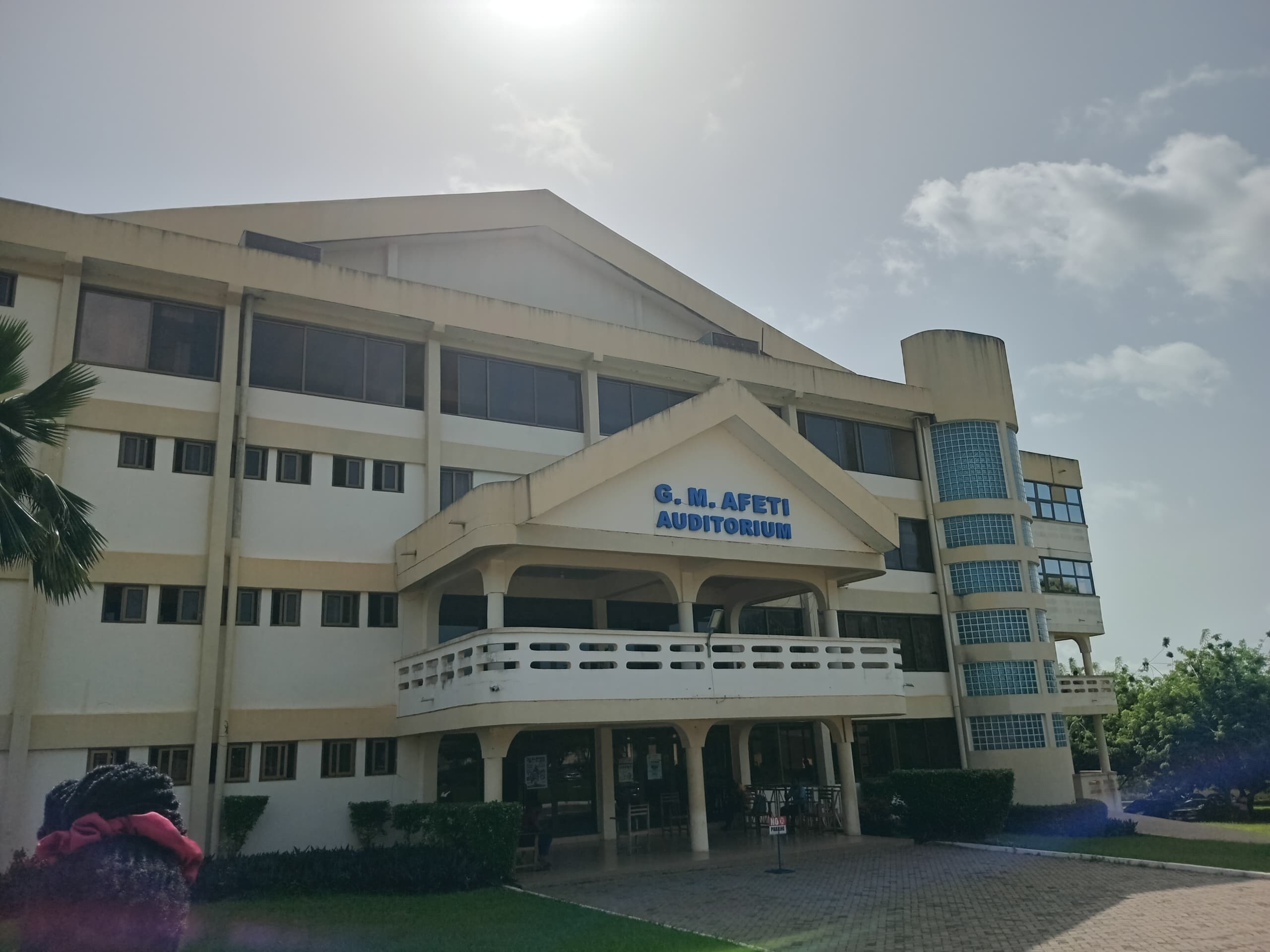
G. M Afeti Auditorium

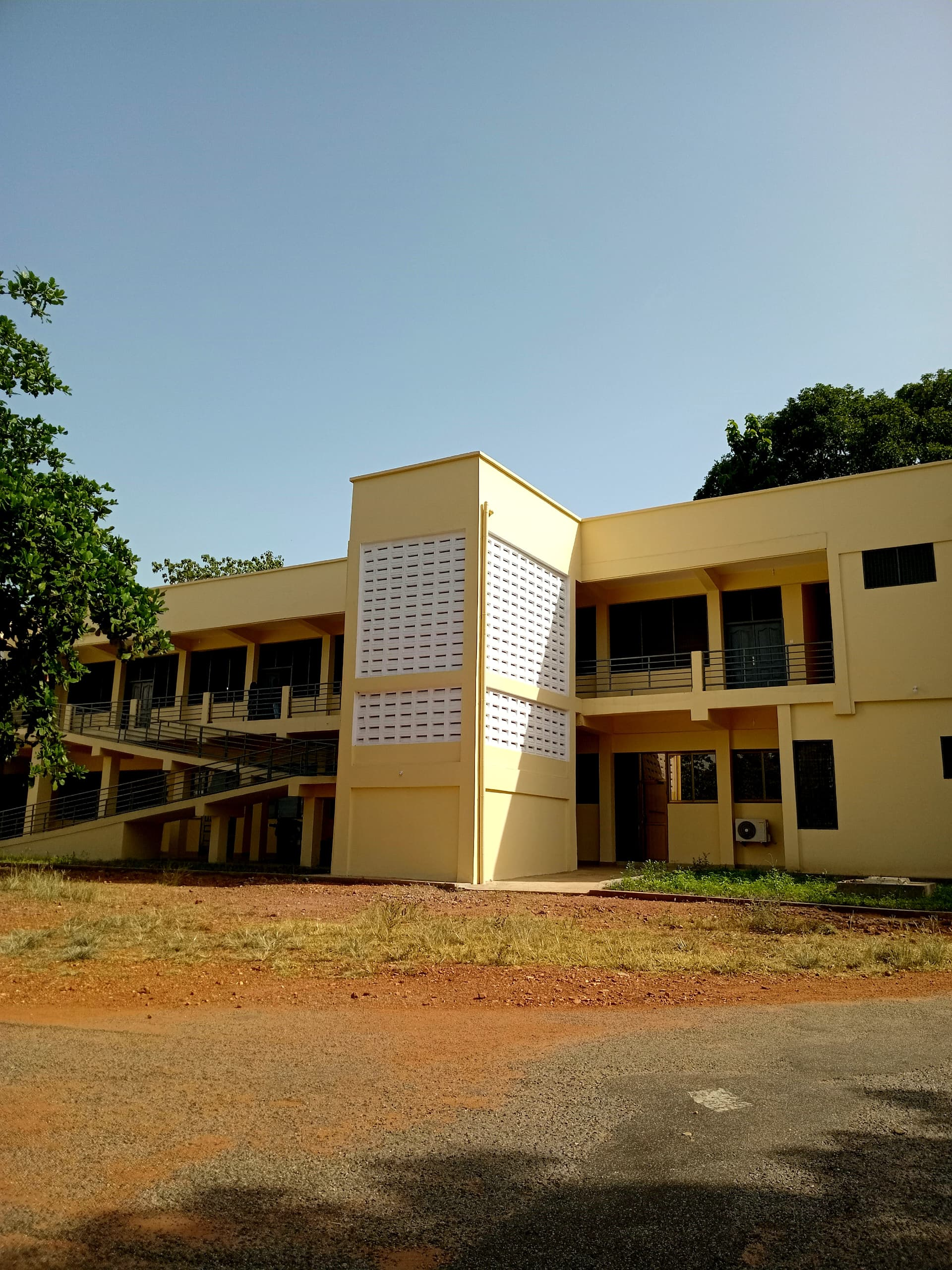
Agricultural engineering department

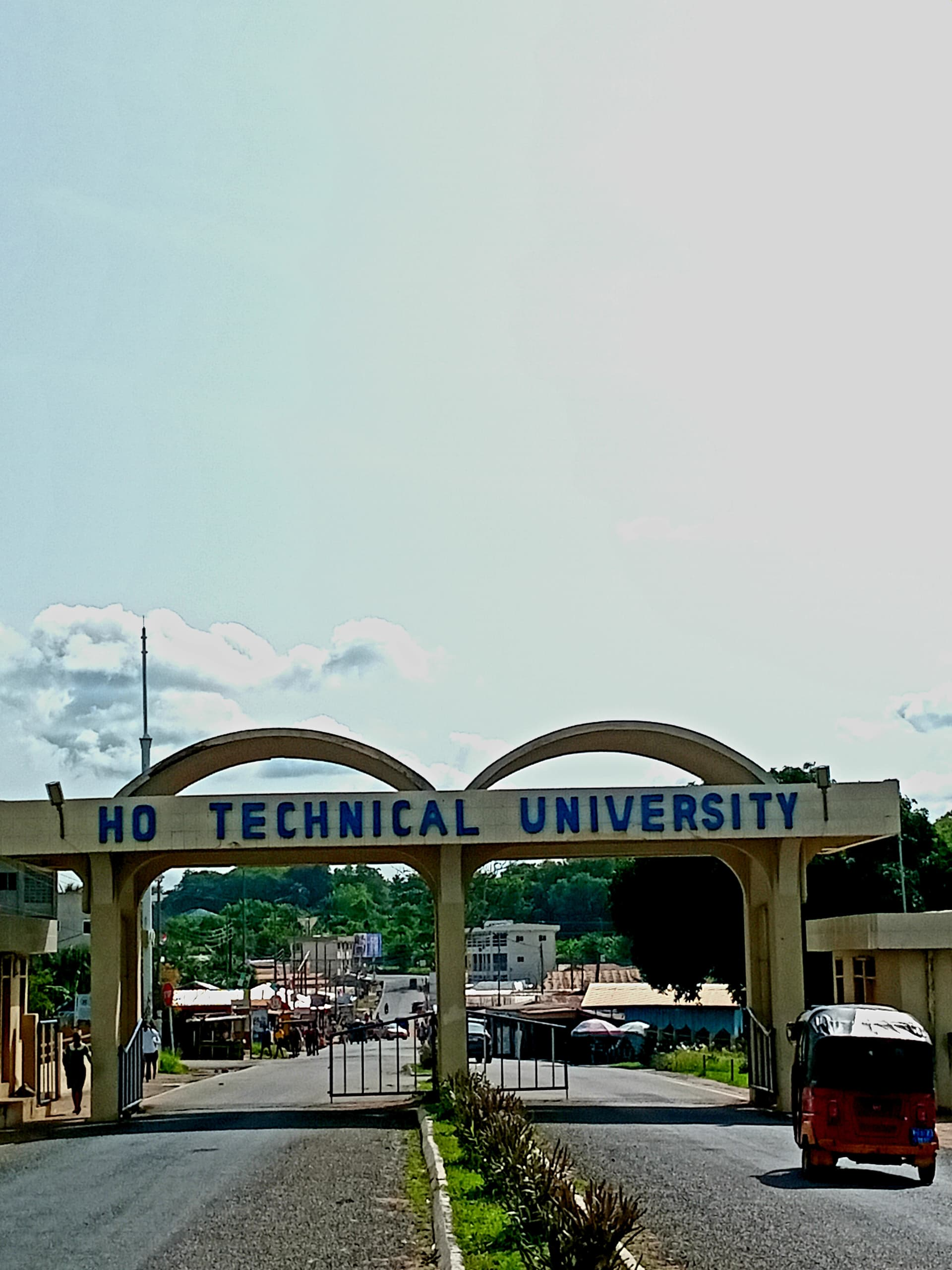
Entrance

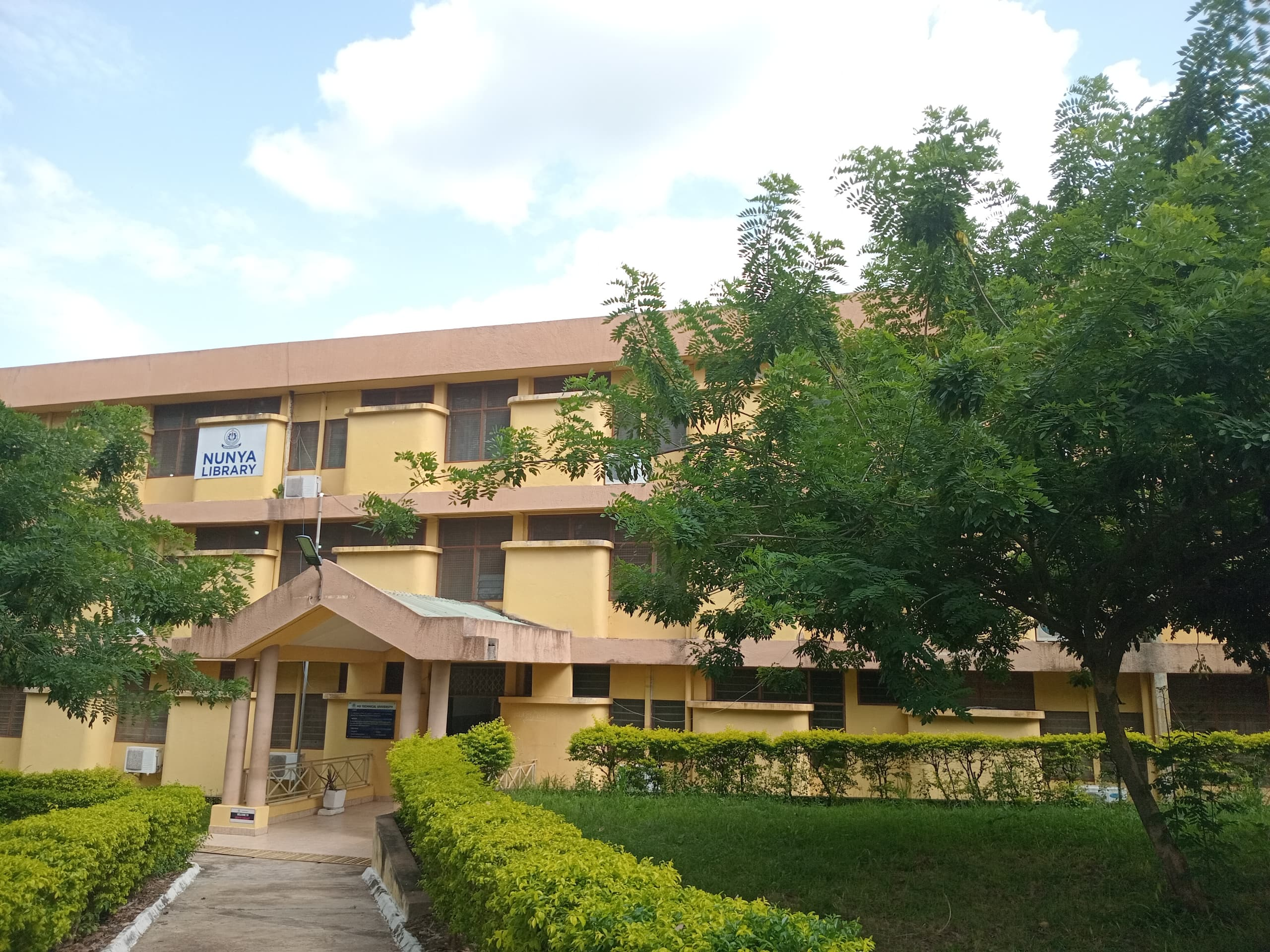
Nunya Library

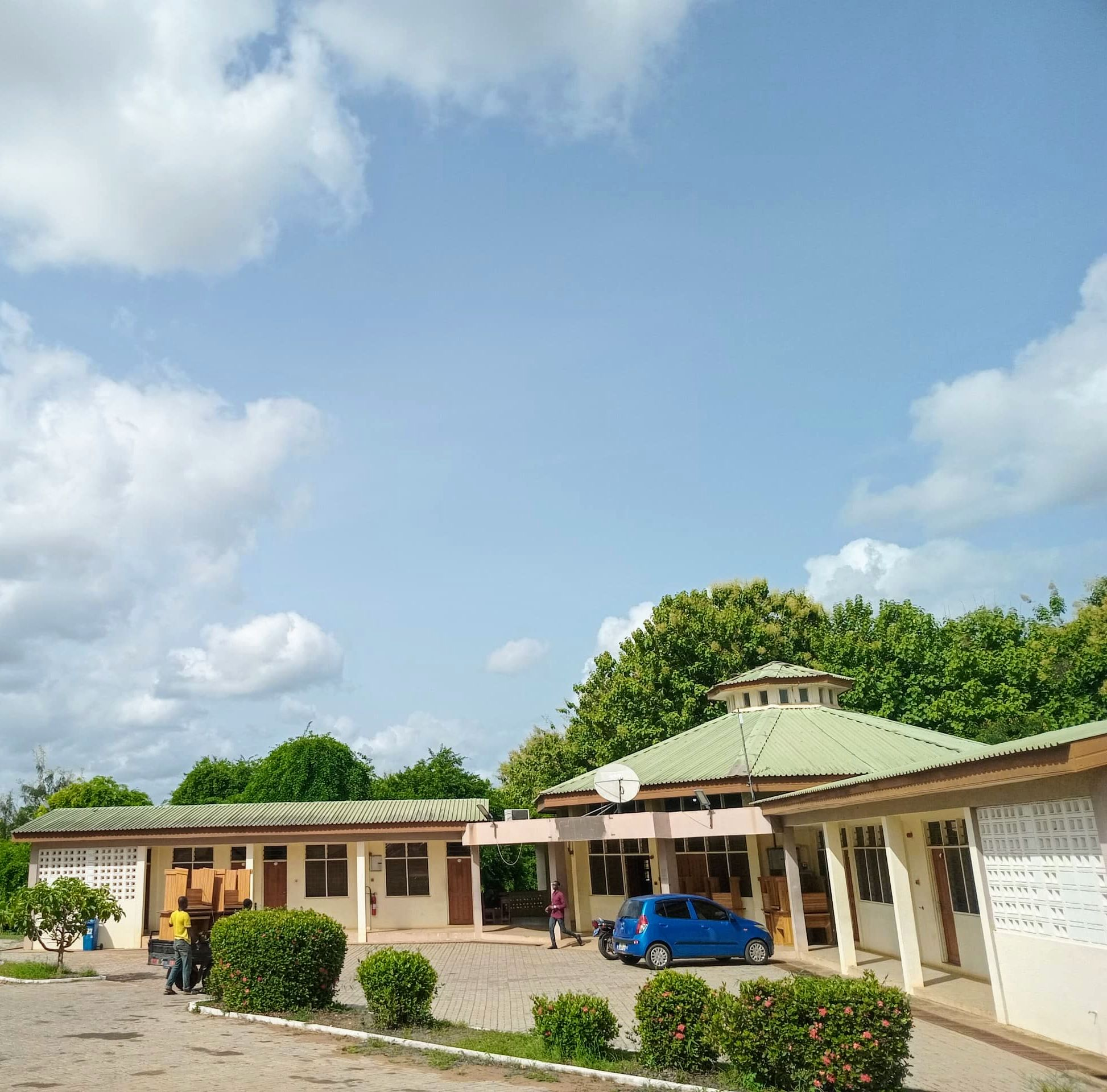
Octagon (Information Technology department)

== Notable alumni ==
- Kwadwo Sheldon

== See also ==
- List of universities in Ghana
- Education in Ghana
