= Ho, Ghana =

City in Volta Region, Ghana

Ho
- City
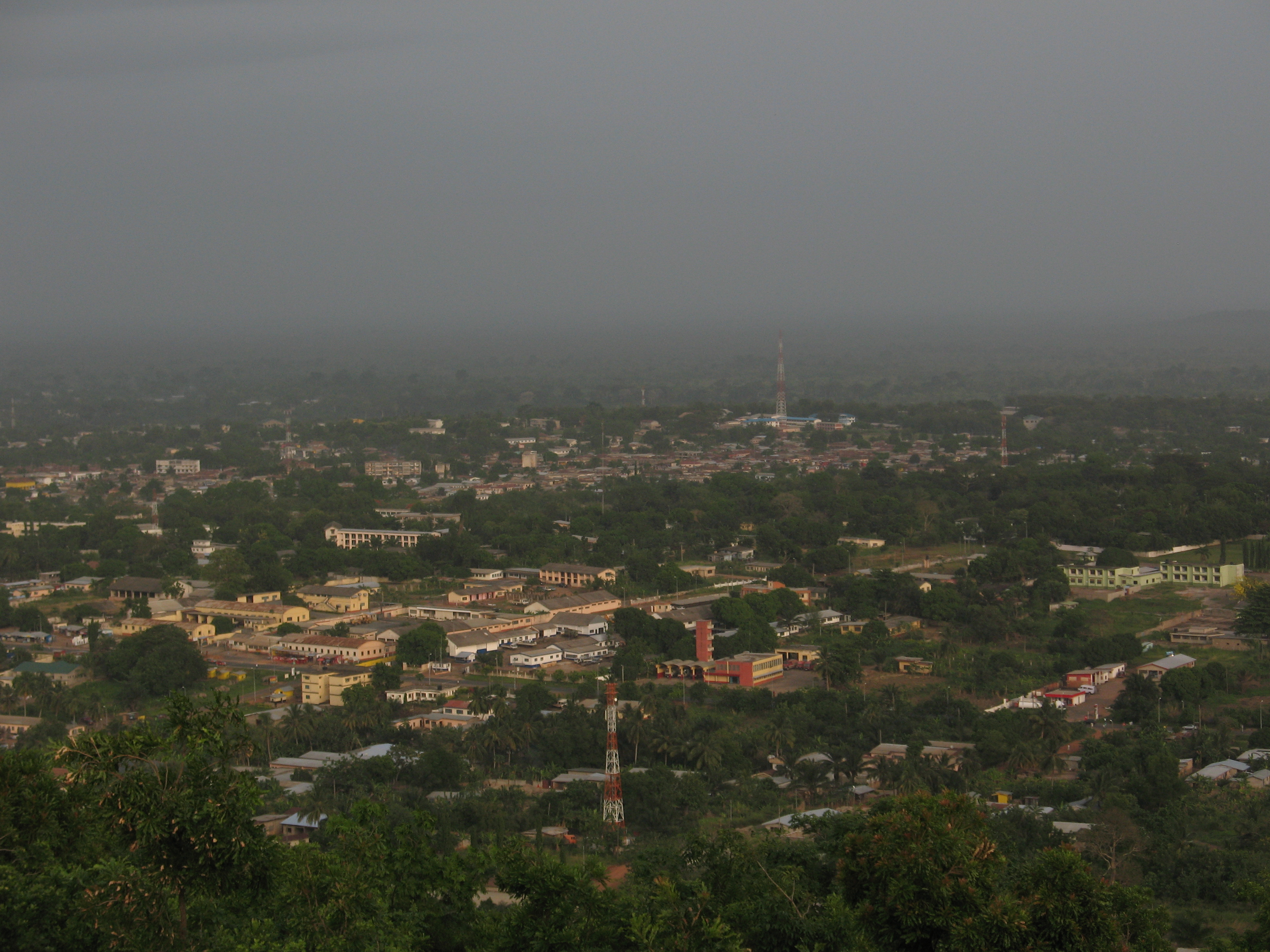
- View of Ho from Northern hills

- Location of Ho in Volta Region
- Coordinates: 6°36′41″N 0°28′13″E
- Country: Ghana
- Region: Volta Region
- District: Ho Municipal District

Area
  - Total: 2,361 km^{2} (912 sq mi)
- Elevation: 150 m (490 ft)

Population (2012)
  - Total: 96,213
  - Density: 40.75/km^{2} (105.5/sq mi)
- Time zone: GMT
  - Summer (DST): GMT
- postal code: VH
- Area code: 036
- Website: hma.gov.gh

Ho is the capital of the Ho Municipal Assembly and in the Volta Region of Ghana. The city lies between Mount Adaklu and Mount Galenukui or Togo Atakora Range, and is home to the Volta Regional Museum, a cathedral, and a prison. The population of Ho Municipality, according to the 2021 Population and Housing Census, is 180,420, representing 10.9 percent of the region's total population. Females constitute 53 percent and males represent 47 percent. About 69.8 percent of the population resides in urban localities. The municipality shares boundaries with Adaklu and Agotime-Ziope Districts to the South, Ho West District to the North and West and the Republic of Togo to the East (see Figure 1.1). Its total land area is 2,361 square kilometers (912 sq mi) thus representing 11.5 percent of the region's total land area.

== History ==
Ho was a part of the German colony of Togoland until World War I, when it was occupied by the British. Ho later became the capital of the League of Nations mandate of British Togoland until that entity's incorporation into the British Gold Coast colony, which subsequently became Ghana. The town was initially inhabited by the people of Hegbe (now Heve), followed by the people of Banakoe (now corrupted to Bankoe). These two groups lived alongside each other with individual chiefdoms. The first known chief of the Bankoe people was Afede Asor I, known in his private life as Akorli. The chief of Heve was Anikpi I, who was known in his private life as Amexo Doh (Adzah Doh). The Ahoe and Dome joined the settlement at a later stage but came to play leading roles in its development. The people of Dome (of Akan origin) became the ruling class until the emergence of modern-day chieftaincy, which they ceded to the Bankoe people. The people of Hliha are a subgroup of Bankoe.

There is more to Ho that just the geographical area, census figure, or city with one name. The city is a central hub of political, economic, and cultural affairs of the Volta Region, serving the role of the region's main city for these purposes. The area started as a village or small community in the Ewe ethnic group and through time transformed into a main administrative center before eventually evolving into its present-day configuration.

== Education and healthcare ==
Education and Healthcare are the two pillars of development in this town. The municipality is a leading educational center in the whole of eastern Ghana. Besides its many teacher training colleges and senior high schools, it houses several tertiary institutions among which are the University of Health and Allied Sciences (UHAS), Ho Technical University to mention but a few. Healthcare for the citizens of this town and neighboring districts is mostly taken care of through the Ho Teaching Hospital alongside the municipal hospital and various private clinics.

== Local economy and industrial development ==
The economy of the area is rather mixed with commerce, civil sector, agriculture and light manufacturing forming the primary sources of income to the inhabitants:

- Buying and Selling: At Ho Central Market, which is among the busiest in the region, traders can find almost any item they like for purchase or selling. There they buy and sell farm goods, textiles, and other everyday commodities.
- Farming: In the countryside where majorly farming is done by the inhabitants who have access to the land, people grow staple crops such as cassava maize yams, plantains, and vegetables as their main sources of food and cash.
- Artisan work and Industries: Artisans in the local communities create traditional goods like hand-woven Kente cloth (with emphasis on nearby towns like Agotime-Kpetoe) that has been the pride of Ghana for centuries, pots and jars of various shapes and materials, and beautifully carved wooden statues.

== Transport and infrastructure ==
Ho has an extensive road system, the main roads of which are direct links to Accra, Eastern Region, and the northern region of Ghana. Besides the road transportation, Ho is also well equipped with Ho Airport. The airport was planned to facilitate the domestic flights thereby also promoting the growth of tourism and business in the Volta Region.

Transport services like taxis and commercial buses (known as trotros) bring Ho in touch with the bigger Ghanaian cities such as Accra and Tema as well as the surrounding villages.

== Culture ==
The traditional festival in Ho is the Asogli Yam Festival, which is celebrated around September of every year. Ho has a lively and huge open market that attracts people from all over the Volta Region and migrants from Togo. There are numerous churches in the Ho municipality, including the cathedral of the Roman Catholic Diocese of Ho. The Evangelical Presbyterian Church of Ghana has its headquarters in Ho. The University of Health and Allied Sciences which was established in 2015 is located in Ho.

Ho maintains a varied local market economy. The main central market aside, many shops, small workshops of craftsmen, and stalls of food vendors are visible on the streets. In the less urbanized parts of the municipality where the farmers are the major means of sustenance for their households, the cultivation of staple crops like cassava maize yam, and plantain remains to be their main source of farm income.

== Geography ==
=== Topography ===
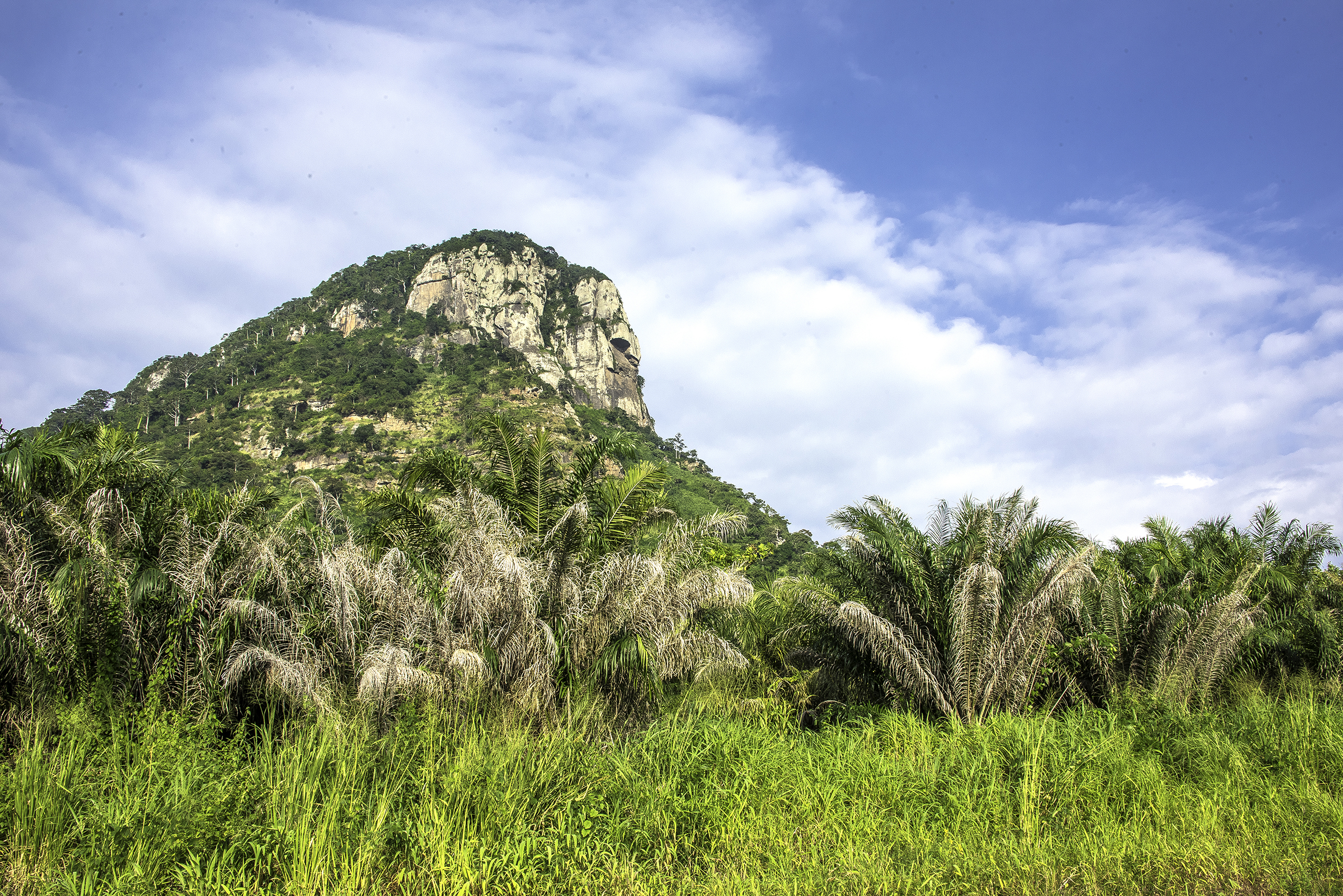
Side view of Mount Adaklu. It is located about 12 km (7.5 mi) from Ho.

The town is situated at the southern edge of the Akwapim Hills (also known as the Togo mountains).

=== Climate ===
Ho, along with the municipality, has a tropical savanna climate (Köppen climate classification Aw), with a wet season and a dry season and the temperature relatively being hot year-round. The yearly mean temperature usually ranges from 16.5 to 37.8 °C (61.7 to 100.0 °F) while the mean monthly temperature is between 22 and 32 °C (72 and 90 °F). The maximum average yearly rainfall was 2,103 mm (6.900 ft) whilst the minimum was 1,168 mm (3.832 ft). The rainy season usually begins from March to June while the dry season is from July to November. The relative humidity can reach 80% on average.

Climate data for Ho (1991–2020; extremes, 1946–present)
Month	Jan	Feb	Mar	Apr	May	Jun	Jul	Aug	Sep	Oct	Nov	Dec	Year
Record high °C (°F)	39.1 (102.4)	40.7 (105.3)	40.0 (104.0)	38.9 (102.0)	37.8 (100.0)	34.2 (93.6)	33.3 (91.9)	35.0 (95.0)	35.5 (95.9)	35.0 (95.0)	36.5 (97.7)	37.8 (100.0)	40.7 (105.3)
Mean daily maximum °C (°F)	34.5 (94.1)	35.7 (96.3)	34.8 (94.6)	33.6 (92.5)	32.6 (90.7)	30.8 (87.4)	29.5 (85.1)	29.4 (84.9)	30.6 (87.1)	31.8 (89.2)	33.3 (91.9)	33.8 (92.8)	32.5 (90.5)
Daily mean °C (°F)	28.7 (83.7)	29.9 (85.8)	29.5 (85.1)	28.9 (84.0)	28.2 (82.8)	26.9 (80.4)	25.9 (78.6)	25.7 (78.3)	26.5 (79.7)	27.2 (81.0)	28.3 (82.9)	28.4 (83.1)	27.8 (82.0)
Mean daily minimum °C (°F)	22.8 (73.0)	24.1 (75.4)	24.2 (75.6)	24.1 (75.4)	23.8 (74.8)	22.9 (73.2)	22.3 (72.1)	22.0 (71.6)	22.4 (72.3)	22.7 (72.9)	23.2 (73.8)	23.0 (73.4)	23.1 (73.6)
Record low °C (°F)	15.5 (59.9)	19.0 (66.2)	18.6 (65.5)	19.5 (67.1)	19.3 (66.7)	18.5 (65.3)	16.0 (60.8)	16.0 (60.8)	18.0 (64.4)	19.0 (66.2)	19.5 (67.1)	15.5 (59.9)	15.5 (59.9)
Average precipitation mm (inches)	20.3 (0.80)	48.2 (1.90)	101.7 (4.00)	139.0 (5.47)	154.0 (6.06)	191.1 (7.52)	114.1 (4.49)	72.5 (2.85)	181.9 (7.16)	162.4 (6.39)	49.8 (1.96)	29.9 (1.18)	1,264.9 (49.78)
Average precipitation days (≥ 1.0 mm)	1.4	3.7	6.9	7.9	10.0	11.4	8.9	7.1	12.1	13.2	4.5	2.4	89.5
Average relative humidity (%)	62	61	68	71	74	78	78	77	78	76	71	51	72
Mean monthly sunshine hours	226.3	217.5	226.3	204.0	229.4	147.0	117.8	145.7	138.0	223.2	249.0	260.4	2,384.6
Mean daily sunshine hours	7.3	7.7	7.3	6.8	7.4	4.9	3.8	4.7	4.6	7.2	8.3	8.4	6.2
Source 1: NOAA
Source 2: Deutscher Wetterdienst (extremes, humidity 1973-1994, sun 1958–1962)

== Sports ==
The Ho Sports Stadium is located in the town.

== Transportation ==
While the roads in the central parts of Ho are paved, the roads outside are not. An airport was completed in 2017 to serve Ho, although it was not opened to commercial traffic until 2021.

== List of settlements ==
NO	SETTLEMENT	POPULATION	POPULATION YEAR
1	HO	200,000	2000
2	HO	177,281	2010
3	HO	180,420	2021

== Human resources ==
=== Health ===
The town's primary health clinic is the Ho Poly Clinic. Also, it has the Ho Municipal Hospital which serves as secondary health facility while the Ho Teaching Hospital which was established in 1999 and upgraded to its current status is affiliated to the University of Health and Allied Sciences (UHAS) and provides service not only patients from the municipality but also ones from Benin, Nigeria, and Togo.

=== Education ===
There are many private and public basic schools in Ho. A list of tertiary institutions in Ho follows:

==== Tertiary institutions ====
- University of Health and Allied Sciences
- Ho Technical University, formally Ho Polytechnic
- Ghana Technology University College,
- Princefield University College
- Evangelical Presbyterian University College
- Ho Nurses Training Schools (Community Health & RGN)
- Ho School of Hygiene
- DataLink Institute, Ho
- GCom Institute of Science and Technology

==== Secondary education ====
- Mawuli School
- EPC Mawuko Girls Senior High School
- OLA Girls' Senior High School
- Sacred Heart Senior High School
- Sonrise Christian High School
- St. Prosper's college
- Wallahs Academy
- Holy Spirit College of Education

== Sister cities ==
Ho's sister cities is of the following:

- (United States) Gainesville, Florida (2022)

== See also ==
- British Togoland
