= List of airports in Ghana =

This is a list of airports in Ghana, sorted by location.

== List ==
Airport names shown in bold indicate that the facility has commercial service on scheduled airlines.

| Location | ICAO | IATA | Airport name |
|---|---|---|---|
| Accra | DGAA | ACC | **Accra International Airport** |
| Ho | DGAH | HZO | Ho Airport |
| Kumasi | DGSI | KMS | **Kumasi Airport** |
| Obuasi | DGSO | | Obuasi Airport |
| Paga | DGLN | | Navrongo Airport |
| Sekondi-Takoradi | DGTK | TKD | **Takoradi Airport** |
| Sunyani | DGSN | NYI | Sunyani Airport |
| Tamale | DGLE | TML | **Tamale Airport** |
| Wa | DGLW | WZA | Wa Airport |
| Yendi | DGLY | | Yendi Airport |

== See also ==
- Transport in Ghana
- List of airports by ICAO code: D#DG - Ghana
- Wikipedia: WikiProject Aviation/Airline destination lists: Africa#Ghana
