= Antrak Air =

Airline in Ghana

IATA	ICAO	Call sign
O4	ABV	ANTRAK
- Founded: September 2003
- Ceased operations: 2012
- Hubs: Accra International Airport
- Focus cities: Kumasi, Tamale, Sunyani, Takoradi, Accra.
- Fleet size: 4
- Destinations: 5
- Parent company: Total Flight Comfort
- Headquarters: Accra, Greater Accra, Ghana
- Website: antrakair.com

Antrak Air was a Ghanaian scheduled airline based in the Airport Residential Area of Accra, Ghana. It started operations in September 2003 and operated scheduled domestic, regional and international services, as well as charter services in West Africa. Its main base was at Accra International Airport, Accra.

The company suspended all operations in May 2012 following a fire on board its only aircraft. The company resumed its domestic flights on 6 August after being grounded for about two months, but no longer operates.

== Destinations ==
Antrak Air operated the following scheduled services (at April 2012):

- Africa
  - Ghana
    - Accra - Accra International Airport
    - Kumasi - Kumasi Airport
    - Tamale - Tamale Airport
    - Sunyani - Sunyani Airport
    - Takoradi - Takoradi Airport

Antrak Air was a legally designated carrier of Ghana to numerous countries worldwide, including the United Kingdom, Germany, South Africa and Saudi Arabia.

In September 2011, Antrak Air filed a legal challenge seeking an injunction to suspend operations of new competitor Starbow Airlines.

== Fleet ==
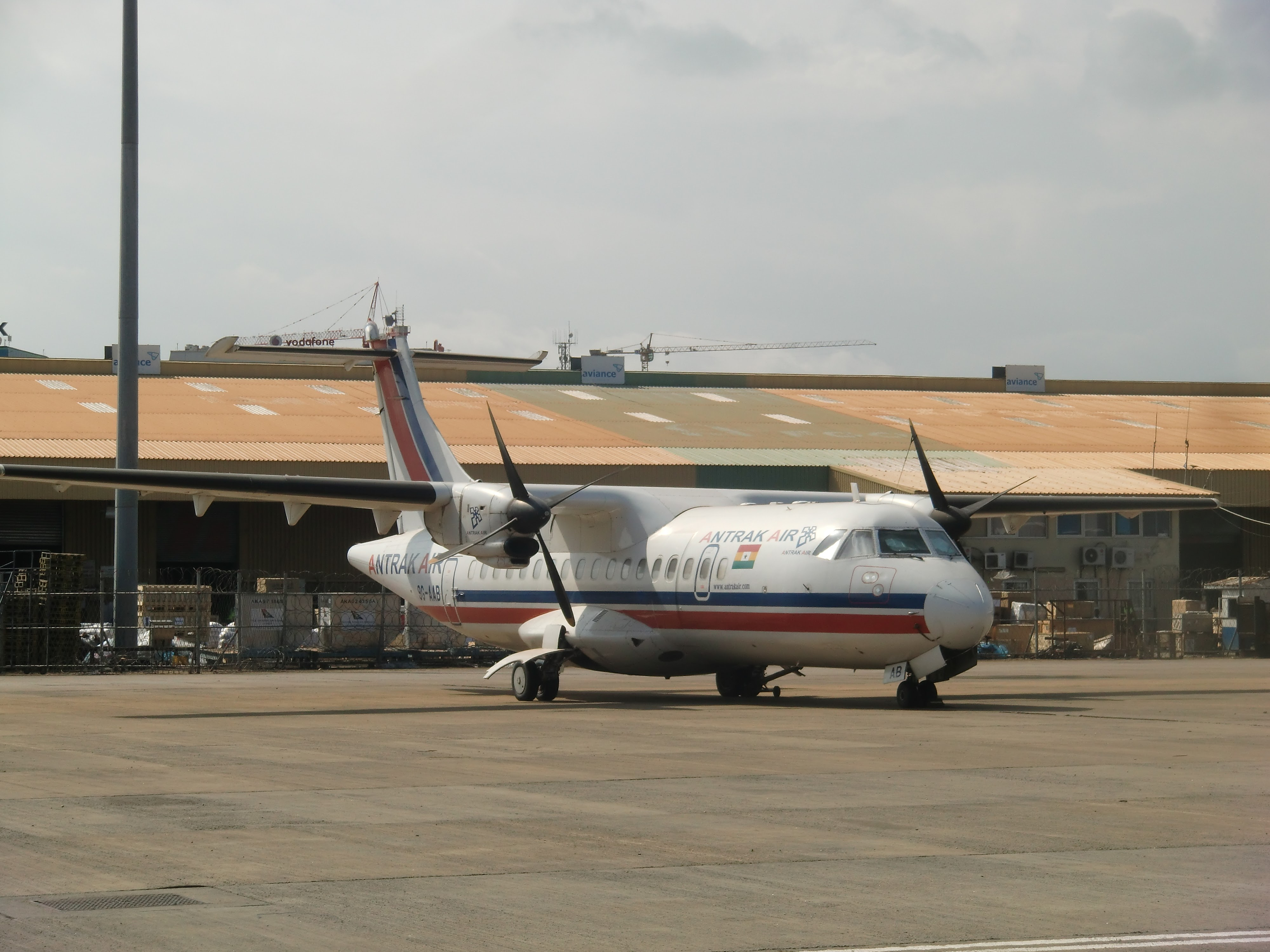
Antrak Air aircraft at Accra International Airport in 2012

The Antrak Air fleet consisted of the following aircraft (as of July 2012):

- 1 ATR-42 (cargo)
- 3 ATR-72 (leased from Swiftair)

== Accidents and incidents ==
- On 22 May 2012, an Antrak Air ATR-42 flying from Tamale to Accra with 33 passengers and four crew caught fire on departure from Tamale Airport. Passengers were evacuated from the aircraft and no fatalities were reported.
- In April 2007, an engine fire occurred on the right engine of an ATR-42 with the registration number of 9G-ANT. This flight was operating the last evening flight from Kumasi to Accra with over 30 passengers. The aircraft landed safely with one engine (left engine) in Accra.
