= Africa World Airlines =

Commercial airline of Ghana

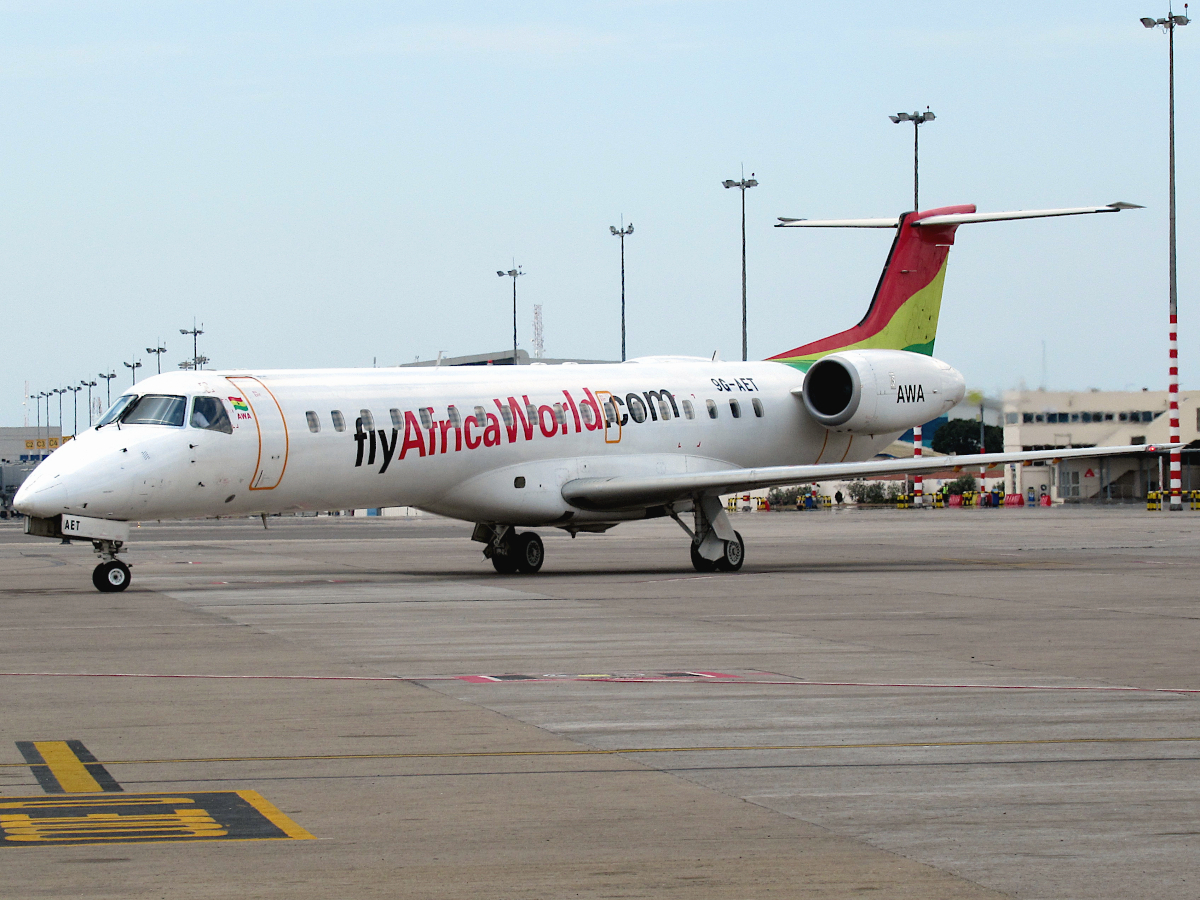
IATA	ICAO	Call sign
AW	AFW	BLACKSTAR
- Founded: 2010; 16 years ago
- Commenced operations: 21 September 2012; 14 years ago
- AOC #: 030
- Hubs: Accra International Airport
- Fleet size: 7
- Destinations: 6
- Headquarters: Accra, Ghana
- Key people: Luolin Cui (CEO)
- Founder: Togbe Afede XIV
- Employees: 381 (2020)
- Website: www.flyafricaworld.com

Africa World Airlines Limited (AWA) is a Ghanaian airline company that was incorporated in 2010 and commenced flights in 2012. It has its head office in Airport City Accra, and its main hub at Accra International Airport in Accra.

It is the largest airline in Ghana with over 600,000 passengers booked in 2022, accounting for 55% of domestic passengers and 20% of all air passengers in the country. The airline has been consistently profitable since 2014.

AWA is a joint venture between Ghanaian shareholders SAS Finance Group and SSNIT, with minority shareholdings also by both HNA Group (now Liaoning Fangda Group Industrial) and China-Africa Development Fund via Zhongjia Investments of China.

== History ==
=== Startup ===
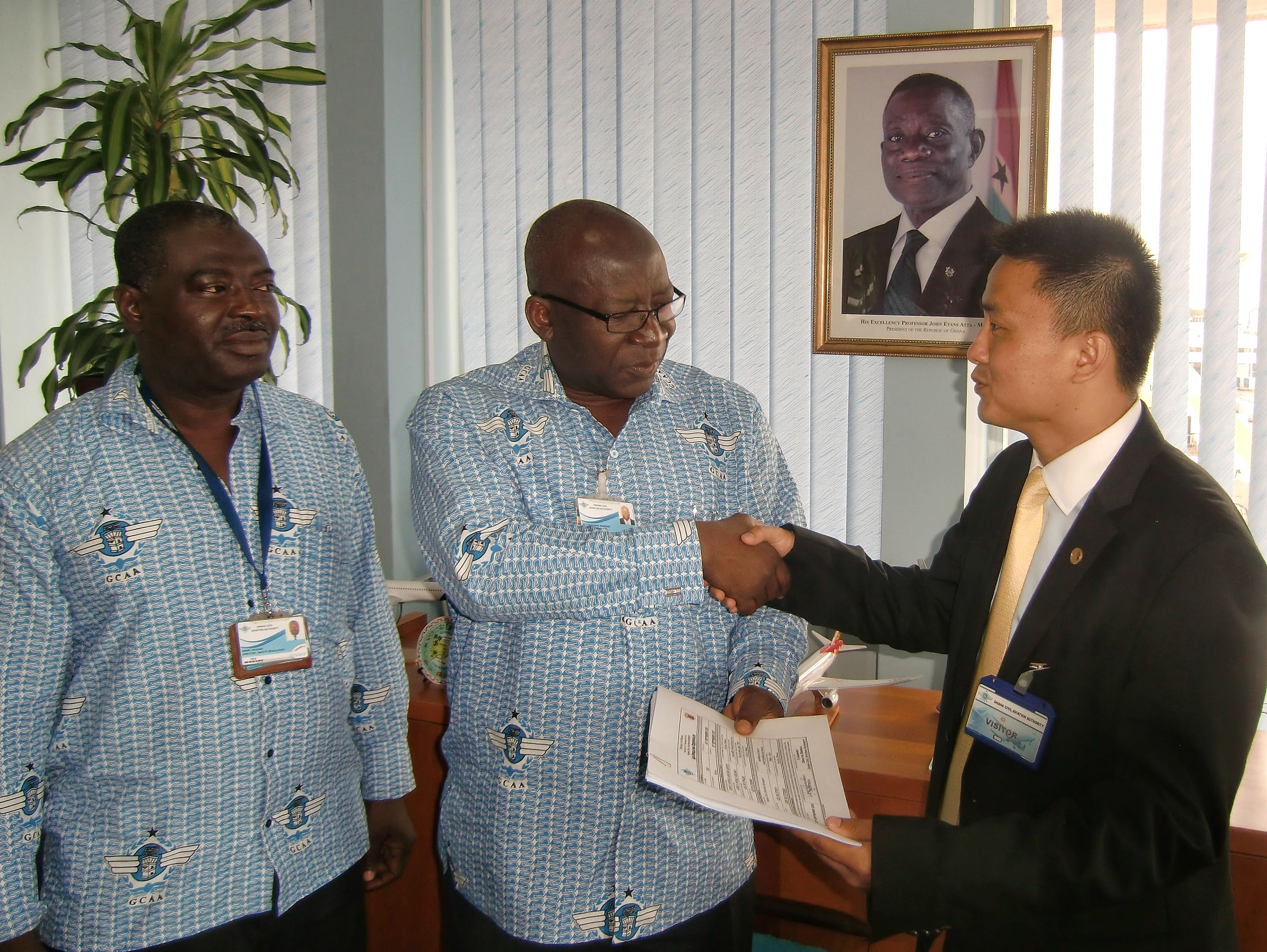
Presentation of AOC to Africa World Airlines on 21 September 2012

AWA was born as the brainchild of noted Ghanaian investment banker and traditional leader Togbe Afede XIV. The airline received its Air Carrier License from Ghana Civil Aviation Authority on 4 March 2011. After securing funding and partnership for the project, the initial management team led by CEO Zhang Jiuhua and COO Sean Mendis proceeded with the technical certification of the airline. AWA took delivery of its first Embraer 145 aircraft in August 2012, immediately followed by a second aircraft in September 2012. It received its Air Operator Certificate on 21 September 2012 and commenced flight operations that same day with daily services between Accra and Kumasi. Flights to Tamale commenced later that year. By 2013, Zhang had been replaced by Michael Cheng Luo as CEO, and Mendis was replaced as COO by Apiigy Afenu. A third Embraer 145 was delivered in November 2013 as the airline increased frequencies on the domestic routes.

=== Consolidation ===
In December 2013, AWA launched its first international route connecting Accra with Murtala Muhammad International Airport in Lagos. Services to its fourth domestic destination of Takoradi commenced in May 2015. Plans for expansion of regional routes were temporarily put on hold due to the outbreak of Ebola in West Africa, but the airline nonetheless recorded its first annual profits in 2014. The airline continued to expand its domestic market share during this period, and focussed on training Ghanaian staff in technical roles such as pilots and engineers to reduce dependence on expatriates. In May 2015, AWA successfully completed its first IOSA audit, making it only the second airline in Ghana to achieve this international safety standard. In October 2015, Samuel Thompson took over from Apiigy Afenu as COO.

=== Expansion ===
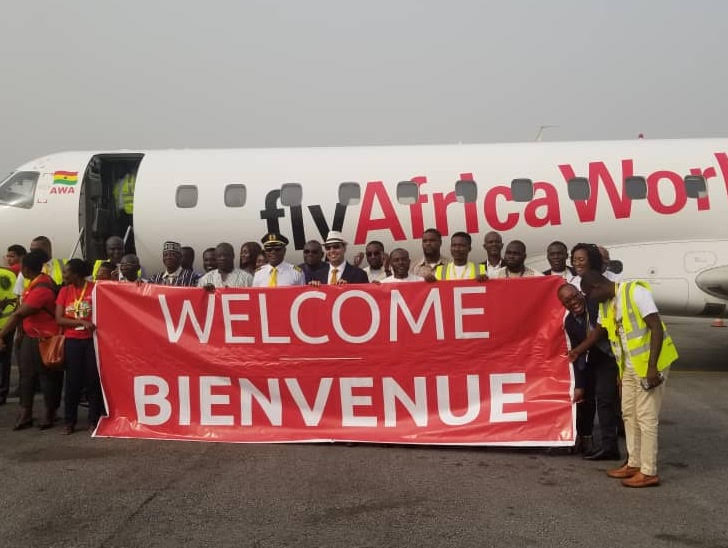
Africa World Airlines inaugural flight to Abidjan on 14 February 2020

AWA began the next phase of its expansion in December 2016, with the delivery of its fourth Embraer 145 aircraft. In 2017, John Xiaoyi Quan, former Managing Director of Air Guilin in China, took over as CEO. Two additional aircraft were also delivered in 2017 taking the fleet up to six. New services to Abuja and Monrovia were launched. AWA became a full member of IATA in 2017, following the completion of its second IOSA audit. The airline is the only IATA member airline in Ghana. In 2018, Sean Mendis returned as COO after 6 years away. The airline launched flights to Freetown in 2018, Wa in 2019, and Abidjan in 2020. Michael Cheng Luo also returned as CEO in 2019 and the airline took delivery of its seventh and eight aircraft in 2018 and 2019 respectively. The airline was the largest international carrier operating to Nigeria by 2019 with 200 monthly frequencies to both Lagos and Abuja. AWA consolidated its position as the premier airline in Anglophone West Africa with its dominance of the Nigerian regional travel market, and its numerous partnerships with international airlines.

=== COVID-19 pandemic ===
AWA temporarily suspended passenger operations on 30 March 2020 due to the spread of COVID-19 in Ghana. Domestic passenger operations resumed on 1 May 2020 under enhanced sanitary protocols, including disinfection of the aircraft after each flight. The airline continued to operate humanitarian flights to repatriate Ghanaians stranded abroad during the period of closed borders, and began a phased resumption of international flights from September 2020. Domestic traffic had recovered to 2019 levels by the end of 2020. AWA received the second highest score among all African airlines for their COVID-19 safety protocols as assessed by independent watchdog Safe Travel Barometer. In 2021, AWA once again booked over 600,000 passengers, thus almost matching the record traffic levels seen in 2019.

=== Post COVID challenges ===
AWA failed to restart flights to Wa after the COVID-19 related disruptions, citing safety concerns at the airport. The airline saw significant staff turnover and changes during the period immediately following the pandemic, with both COO Mendis and CEO Luo exiting the company for the second time at the expiry of their contracts in 2020 and 2022 respectively, and Yingli Zhou taking over as the new Chief Executive. The airline faced significant operational issues that led to the grounding of three aircraft and forced them to suspend flights to Abidjan, Freetown and Monrovia. Increased competition from Passion Air also led to an erosion of AWA's previously dominant domestic market share during 2022. Zhou cited a need to refocus operations away from lower yielding international routes as one of his priorities. In 2023, Adedayo Olawuyi resigned as Head of Commercial to join Uganda Airlines and in 2024, Zhou was replaced by Luolin Cui as CEO

== Fleet ==
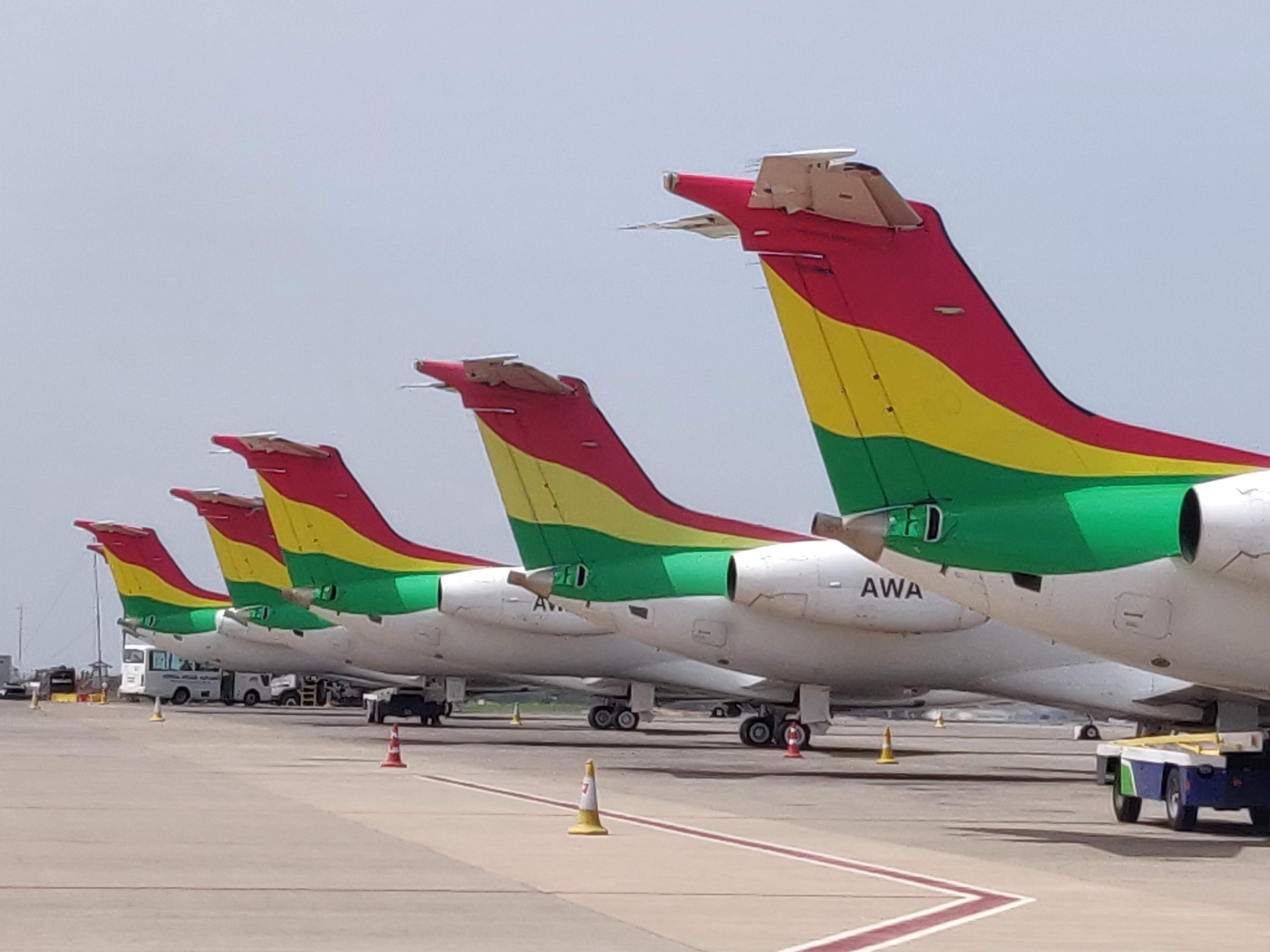
Africa World Airlines ERJ-145s parked at Accra.

=== Current fleet ===
As of July 2026, Africa World Airlines operates the following aircraft:

Africa World Airlines fleet
Aircraft	In service	Passengers			Notes
Aircraft	In service	B	E	Total	Notes
Embraer ERJ-145LR	7	0	50	50	
Total	7				

=== Fleet development ===
Africa World Airlines took delivery on 30 August 2012 of its first Embraer 145 aircraft that was used to operate domestic routes. A second aircraft was delivered on 8 September 2012. The airline added a third aircraft in 2013 and a further five aircraft between 2016 and 2019. All these aircraft were previously operated by Tianjin Airlines which is a sister company within the HNA Group. AWA was the largest operator of the Embraer 145 type in the Middle East and Africa region, but operational constraints have left the fleet with only 4 airworthy aircraft as of September 2022.

Africa World Airlines stated that it intended to introduce two additional ERJ-145s in 2021, as well as a larger capacity aircraft type at the appropriate time to expand its regional routes. In 2019, a three-way MoU was signed between COMAC, CAD Fund and AWA to promote the launch of the ARJ-21 aircraft in the African market, although no specific timeline was given for the introduction of this type.

=== Former fleet ===
As of August 2025, Africa World Airlines operated 8 Embraer ERJ 145.

== Destinations ==
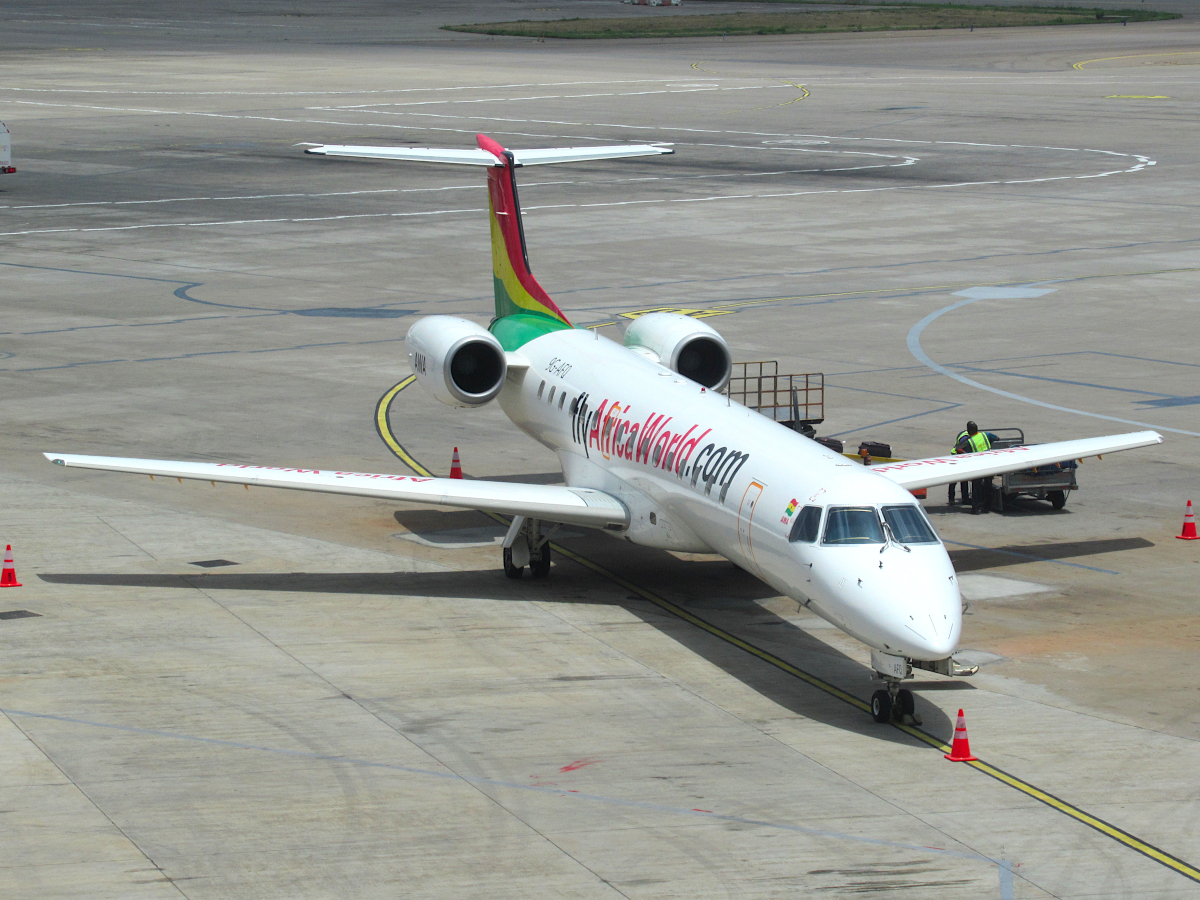
An Africa World Airlines ERJ-145LR at Nnamdi Azikiwe International Airport in Abuja

Africa World Airlines operated the following scheduled services as of July 2025.

Country	City	Airport	Notes	Refs
Burkina Faso	Ouagadougou	Thomas Sankara International Airport		
Cote D'Ivoire	Abidjan	Félix-Houphouët-Boigny International Airport		
Ghana	Accra	Accra International Airport	Hub	
Ghana	Kumasi	Prempeh I International Airport		
Ghana	Takoradi	Takoradi Airport		
Ghana	Tamale	Yakubu Tali International Airport		
Ghana	Wa	Wa Airport	Suspended	
Guinea	Conakry	Ahmed Sékou Touré International Airport	(begins 4 August 2026)	
Liberia	Monrovia	Roberts International Airport	Suspended	
Nigeria	Abuja	Nnamdi Azikiwe International Airport		
Nigeria	Lagos	Murtala Muhammed International Airport		
Sierra Leone	Freetown	Lungi International Airport	Suspended	

On 15 April 2021, Africa World Airlines conducted the first ever test flight by a jet aircraft to Ho Airport in the Volta Region of Ghana. The airline stated that they intended to commence scheduled services between Ho and Accra shortly thereafter. However, in March 2022, AWA confirmed that it had decided not to launch flights on this route due to operational challenges.

In August 2022, AWA made the decision to suspend all flights to Freetown and Monrovia due to operational constraints. Coming on the heels of the cancellation of Abidjan services, it left AWA serving only destinations in Ghana and Nigeria as of September 2022. However, the airline started services to Ouagadougou in Burkina Faso in July 2025.

== Statistics ==
As a privately owned carrier, AWA does not make financial data available to the public. However, traffic statistics are published by the airline as well as Ghana Civil Aviation Authority and Ghana Airports Company Limited. Other figures have been made available via press reports, interviews and other publications.

	2012	2013	2014	2015	2016	2017	2018	2019	2020	2021	2022	2023
Profitability	loss	loss	profit	profit	profit	profit	profit	profit				
Number of employees							276	381				
Number of passengers		85,850	149,940	184,800	251,289	418,889	467,438	601,930	335,989	600,196	601,790	471,675
Passenger load factor (%)					74.8%	75.2%	77.1%	76.7%	76.4%	86.8%	86.1%	80.2%
Number of aircraft (at year end)	2	3	3	3	5	6	7	8	8	8	7	5

== Partnerships ==
Africa World Airlines has interline agreements with the following airlines:

- Air Burkina
- ASKY
- Brussels Airlines
- Cabo Verde Airlines
- Emirates
- Ethiopian Airlines
- Kenya Airways
- Qatar Airways
- South African Airways
- TAP Air Portugal

=== Agreements ===
In 2019, AWA signed a Memorandum of Understanding with South African Airways to jointly pursue opportunities in West Africa, including a system-wide codeshare agreement and other commercial partnerships. The codeshare went into effect in October 2019.

The airline also announced an interline partnership with Emirates to provide domestic and regional feed to their flights at Accra International Airport in Accra.

AWA also signed a tripartite partnership with Ethiopian Airlines and ASKY to offer seamless travel within the West African region.

In October 2019, AWA and Brussels Airlines concluded an interline partnership to connect passengers through their joint networks.

AWA and Air Burkina announced in January 2020 that they had concluded a partnership for passengers to connect from Ouagadougou through Accra to Lagos, Abuja and Abidjan.

Africa World Airlines and Cabo Verde Airlines also announced a partnership effective from February 2020 to improve connectivity in West Africa between their respective networks.

In May 2022, AWA and Kenya Airways announced an expansion of their partnership to enhance West African connectivity between the two airlines over AWA's hub at Accra International Airport in Accra.

== Awards and recognition ==
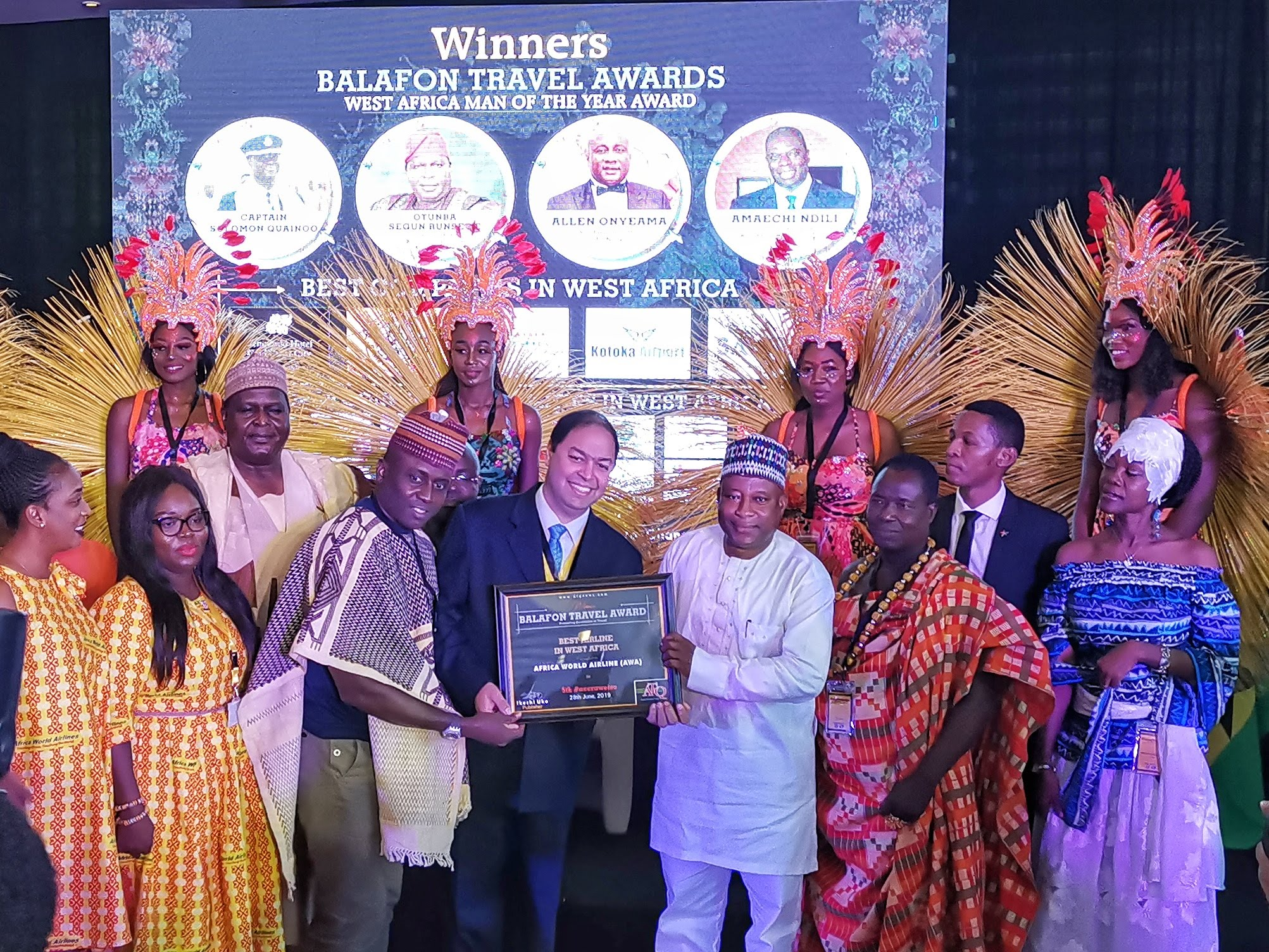
The AWA team receives the award as "Best Airline in West Africa" for 2019

Africa World Airlines has been recognised as "Domestic Airline of the Year" in Ghana every year consecutively since 2015. In September 2019, the airline was inducted into the CIMG Hall of Fame after being voted the winner in the "Domestic Airline of the Year" category for five consecutive years.

Africa World Airlines was also recognised as "Best Airline in West Africa" for 2019 by the Balafon Travel Awards being held during the Accra Weizo 2019 travel conference and exhibition.

In April 2019, AWA was recognised by Embraer for providing the highest quality standard of fleet reliability data among all Embraer 145 operators worldwide.

In October 2019, Africa World Airlines received the 2019 AviaTour award for "Best Passenger Experience".

In December 2019, the prestigious Routes Africa Awards honored the airline with the Airline Excellence Award for "Innovation and Capacity Growth" in recognition for AWA's steady growth and creative marketing.

AWA also received recognition and commendation from the Brazilian Ministry of Foreign Affairs and President Jair Bolsonaro in July 2020, for assisting with the repatriation of Brazilian citizens from 7 countries in West Africa during the COVID-19 pandemic.

Africa World Airlines was the recipient of the Tower Award for "Best African Airline Connectivity (Regional)" at the Aviators Africa conference in October 2021. The airline won the award for the second consecutive year in October 2022.

In February 2022, AWA was recognised as the Best International Carrier in Nigeria for 2021 by the organisers of the Abuja Jabamah Travel Awards.

== Incidents ==
- On 13 February 2018, an Africa World Airlines Embraer 145 from Lagos to Accra with 41 passengers and 4 crew was the target of a robbery plot while taxiing for departure. The pilot discharged hot air from the aircraft's exhaust onto the robbers, scaring them away. The aircraft was subsequently checked by police and departed after a 2 hour delay.
