= DGSN =

DGSN may refer to:

- Direction Générale de Surêté Nationale, or Sûreté Nationale (Morocco)
- Direction Générale de Surêté Nationale, the Algerian police
- Sunyani Airport, Ghana, ICAO code DGSN
