= Ivory Coast (disambiguation) =

The Ivory Coast (officially Côte d'Ivoire or République de Côte d'Ivoire) is a country in West Africa.

Ivory Coast may also refer to:

- Ivory Coast, 1988 album by jazz artist Bob James
- Ivory Coast, another name for the drug Ivory Wave
