= Drug policy of Canada =

Canada's drug regulations are measures of the Food and Drug Act and the Controlled Drugs and Substances Act. In relation to controlled and restricted drug products, the Controlled Drugs and Substances Act establishes eight schedules of drugs and new penalties for the possession, trafficking, exportation and production of controlled substances as defined by the Governor-in-Council. Drug policy of Canada has traditionally favoured punishment for the smallest of offences, but this convention was partially broken in 1996 with the passing of the Controlled Drugs and Substances Act.

== History ==
Until 1908 the use of narcotics, opiates, and especially alcohol and tobacco in Canada was unregulated but were on the path to regulation. From the 1850s onwards, Chinese immigrants came to British Columbia in droves, establishing opium dens in their isolated communities. Canadian employers saw the Chinese immigrants as a source of cheap labour, and the government viewed opium consumption as another way to gain revenue, imposing a tax on opium factories in 1871. However, with the decline of the gold rush in the 1880s resentment towards the Chinese grew, as unemployed Canadians could not compete with cheap Chinese labour. Additionally, Japanese immigration to Canada began to rise sharply, resulting in demonstrations against Asian labour. In 1907, there was a particularly large demonstration against Asian immigrants in Vancouver's Chinatown. In response to the demonstrations, Deputy Minister of Labour Mackenzie King travelled to British Columbia and interviewed two opium merchants. King was concerned with the growing numbers of white opium users and believed that Canada had to set the precedent on drug use worldwide. The following year the government enacted the Opium Act of 1908, which made it an offence to import, manufacture, possess or sell opium, while not making it an imprisonable offence. The same year, Parliament passed the Proprietary and Patent Medicine Act 1908, prohibiting the use of cocaine in medicines and requiring pharmaceutical companies to list on the label the ingredients of any medicine if heroin, morphine, or opium was part of the contents.

The 1908 drug law created a black market for opium, and law enforcement officials believed that the only way to stop this black market was through imprisonment for offenders, so the Opium and Drugs Act 1911 was passed by Parliament. This created harsher penalties for drug offenders and also expanded the list of prohibited drugs to include morphine and cocaine, while cannabis was included in 1923. During World War I, all provinces enacted prohibition, a decision repealed in all areas except Prince Edward Island by 1929. In 1921 the penalties of the Opium and Drugs Act were expanded to provide for a seven-year prison sentence for crimes committed under the Act. The amendment also made it an offence to be in a building that contained narcotics, notably shifting the burden of proof to the defendant for this crime. Whipping and deportation became penalties for violations of the 1911 Act in 1922.

Canada's 1920s drug policy was not all that different from that of the present day. Drug users were considered more as criminals than as those with an illness, and the enforcement of drug laws was given precedence over the treatment of offenders. Additionally, almost three-quarters of those convicted by the 1911 drug laws were Chinese in 1922. This led many white Canadians to believe that the drug laws had no effect on them; they thought they only applied to those of Asiatic descent.

In 1923, the government introduced the Act to Prohibit the Improper Use of Opium and other Drugs; this was a consolidation of other legislation but now listed three new drugs, including marijuana. Historians often point to the 1922 publication of Emily Murphy’s The Black Candle (which was reprinted in 1973) as the inspiration for the addition of the three extra drugs. However, according to Canadian Historian Catherine Carstairs, Murphy was not respected by the Division of Narcotic Control because of the creative liberties she took in presenting research they had assisted her with. "There were insinuations in the records that the bureaucrats at the division of narcotic control did not think very highly of Emily Murphy and did not pay attention to what she was writing about, and they didn't consider her a particularly accurate or valuable source."

In 1929 the Opium and Narcotic Drug Act was enacted, establishing harsher penalties for drug users. This was to become the main drug regulation in Canada until the late 1960s. In 1954, the penalty for drug trafficking was doubled from seven to fourteen years. During that decade, the media published highly sensationalized reports of drug use amongst youths, even though the rate of drug use in Canada was actually declining. In 1961, the Narcotic Control Act made the possession of cannabis, amongst other drugs, an indictable offence and made the minimum sentence for drug trafficking fourteen years (as opposed to the previous maximum sentence).

Between 1969 and 1973 the Commission of Inquiry into the Non Medical Use of Drugs (or the Le Dain Commission) examined the use of narcotics in Canada and recommended that the drug laws were changed to become more lenient and gradually decriminalize illicit drugs. Although consensus in Parliament appeared to be gradually turning in favour of implementing the Commission's recommendations, the drug laws remained unchanged, although a bill to remove cannabis from the Narcotic Control Act and create a new Part V of the Food and Drugs Act reducing sentences for all offences did pass the Senate but failed in the House of Commons.

During the 1980s, federal concern about illicit drug use and trafficking increased, and officials framed drugs as a national social and health problem alongside developments in the United States.

In May 1987, when the Mulroney government launched Canada’s first five‑year National Drug Strategy, national consultations identified alcohol abuse as the most serious substance use problem in Canada, both in terms of health and social costs and its contribution to criminal justice issues such as impaired driving. Tobacco and the misuse of prescription and over-the-counter medications were also singled out, while street drugs such as cannabis, heroin, cocaine and, in some regions, inhalants and solvents were noted as additional but comparatively less prevalent sources of harm and crime. In 1988, Parliament created the Canadian Centre on Substance Abuse (now the Canadian Centre on Substance Use and Addiction) as part of the National Drug Strategy, in response to growing concern about the social and economic harms associated with alcohol and other drug use and the need for a coordinated national approach.

Canada subsequently became a party to the 1988 United Nations Convention Against Illicit Traffic in Narcotic Drugs and Psychotropic Substances, and in 1996 adopted the federal Controlled Drugs and Substances Act, which consolidated and updated earlier drug control statutes while maintaining a largely prohibitionist framework.

=== Cannabis ===
In 1988, advocating the use of cannabis or cannabis-related products (including hemp) became a crime punishable by $100,000 for a first offence and $300,000 for a second offence, meaning that simply publishing an opinion article with a favourable position on cannabis became illegal. The National Organization for the Reform of Marijuana Laws Canada's office in Ontario was raided by police after being charged with breaking Section 462.2 of the Criminal Code for handing out brochures advocating the legalization of cannabis. In 1994, the Ontario Court of Justice ruled that Section 462.2 stifled freedom of expression and overturned the ban on literature, taking effect only in Ontario. The same year, an Ontario farmer was allowed to grow ten acres of cannabis on his property to research its agricultural potential.

In 1996 the Controlled Drugs and Substances Act was passed. This law repealed the Narcotic Control Act and Parts III and IV of the Food and Drug Act (parts dealing with the advertisement of controlled substances). This Act classified drugs into eight schedules, I to VIII. While the punishments for trafficking illicit drugs in Schedules I and II increased to a maximum of life imprisonment, the penalties for the possession of drugs in Schedule VIII (up to 30g of cannabis and 1g of hashish) decreased to a maximum six months imprisonment and/or a maximum fine of $1000.

Since the enactment of the Controlled Drugs and Substances Act, various courts have struck down parts of the law and amendments have been passed by Parliament. In 2001, Canada became the first country in the world to legalize the use of cannabis for the terminally ill and three years later the Minister of Justice Irwin Cotler announced that legislation is being proposed in the House of Commons to allow for lesser penalties for the possession of cannabis, while toughening penalties for large drug operations.

On 31 January 2023, British Columbia began a three-year pilot program of decriminalizing small amounts (deemed a total of 2.5 grams or less) of a range of drugs for personal use, including: morphine, heroin, meth, ecstasy, crack cocaine and fentanyl. Adults who possess the aforementioned total amount of these drugs (or less) for personal use in British Columbia will not be arrested, prosecuted, fined or jailed and their drugs will not be confiscated. Instead, police are directed to offer referrals to health services for those in possession of this amount or less of these drugs. The pilot is intended to be one of multiple steps in tackling drug overdoses, focusing drug use as a health matter, reducing stigma and disassociating the involuntary intervention of police in the lives of drug users, while also helping to make it easier for those with substances issues to approach authorities for help without the fear of arrest or prosecution. On the one year anniversary of the pilot, continued drug overdoses have been attributed to confused messaging from the government and the arbitrary possession limit of 2.5 grams which has "open[ed] the door for things like discretionary policing, which we know kind of is heavily imbued with bias and tends to be targeted towards poor and racialized populations" according to Nicole Luongo of the Canadian Drug Policy Coalition. The unregulated drug supply has also been highlighted as a major issue due to unknown drug potency levels and an absence of regulated drug quality.

On October 17, 2018 cannabis became legal in Canada. The purpose of the Cannabis Act is to protect public health, public safety, and to "[...] create a strict legal framework to control the production, distribution, sale, and possession of cannabis across Canada". The Cannabis Act aims to accomplish 3 goals; keep cannabis out of the hands of youth, keep profits out of the pockets of criminals, and protect public health and safety by allowing adults access to legal cannabis. Individuals who are 18 years of age or older can, "[...] possess, in a public place, cannabis of one or more classes of cannabis the total amount of which, as determined in accordance with Schedule 3, is equivalent to more than 30 g of dried cannabis."

Canada has begun the process to pardon citizens with past convictions for cannabis possession. "Canada also plans to pardon citizens with past convictions for Cannabis possession". Various studies, research and guides are being created now that cannabis is legal. "[...] informational guides have been coupled with an adequate public education strategy that was only available after legalization."

=== Effects on incarceration since 1995 ===
While street prices of cocaine in Canada are higher than they are in South American and East Asian countries, in the four-year period of 1997 to 2001 the street price of the drug fell by almost thirteen US dollars a gram, from $94.3/gram to $81.6/gram. However, since 1995, the Canadian incarceration rate has been decreasing, from 131 persons per 100,000 incarcerated in 1995 to 107 persons per 100,000 in 2004. Canada is a producer and exporter of both cannabis and ecstasy, a trend that harsher penalties for those caught has failed to stop.

=== Drug Treatment Courts ===
Drug treatment court (DTC), pre-sentence courts introduced in Canada in 1998, provide individuals facing criminal charges driven by their substance abuse addiction (SAD) with a voluntary alternative to a prison sentence. The Canadian model is based on the American drug court system. The first DTC in Canada was a pilot project in Toronto, Ontario in 1998 co-founded by Justice Kofi Barnes and financed with Justice Canada's Drug Treatment Court Funding Program. It was inspired by drug courts that originated in the United States in Miami, Florida in 1989.
