= Ho Airport =

Domestic airport in Ghana

- IATA: none; ICAO: DGAH

Summary
- Airport type: Public
- Owner/Operator: Ghana Airports Company Limited
- Serves: Ho, Ghana
- Location: Ho
- Opened: 4 December 2021
- Time zone: Greenwich Mean Time (GMT)
- Coordinates: 6.58190°N 0.52955°E
- Website: gacl.com.gh/ho-airport//

Map
- Location in Ghana

Runways
Direction	Length		Surface
Direction	m	ft	Surface
05/23	1,900	6,234	Asphalt

Statistics (2022)
- Passengers: 969

Ho Airport (ICAO: DGAH) is a regional airport built to serve Ho in the Volta Region of Ghana. Construction was completed in 2017, although the airport was not opened to commercial traffic until 2021.

== History ==
On 18 September 2015, President John Dramani Mahama held a groundbreaking ceremony for Ho Airport. The construction of the airport is in line with the Ghanaian government's goal to have airports in each of the country's regions. The cost of construction is estimated to be US$25 million, provided by Ghana Airports Company Limited. The company building Ho Airport stated in May 2017 that the project would be finished by the end of 2017. Construction began in September 2015 and was expected to cost US$25 million. Ultimately, airport will cover 1,500 acres (610 ha), with a passenger terminal and a 1,900-metre (6,200 ft) runway.

Africa World Airlines expressed interest in flying to Ho Airport once formally commissioned by the relevant authorities. However, the Minister of Transport stated the airport was intentionally being left idle due to the absence of a state owned carrier.

In January 2021, Africa World Airlines announced that services will begin in April 2021 with two weekly services from Accra. On 15 April 2021, Africa World Airlines made the first test flight to Ho Airport with an Embraer 145 jet aircraft. The flight was co-piloted by Togbe Afede XIV, who is also the Agbogbomefia of the Asogli State.

Passion Air had an inaugural flight from the Accra International Airport in Accra to the Ho Airport on 1 December 2021. The airline announced that its first commercial flights will be on 4 December 2021 to and from Accra. The airline initially plans to fly to Ho twice a week. Flights were suspended in March 2022, citing low patronage and high fuel costs.

== Airlines and destinations ==
All scheduled flights to Ho were suspended in March 2022, with Passion Air citing low patronage and high fuel costs as the reasons. Africa World Airlines also confirmed that it had decided not to launch flights to Ho due to operational challenges.

== Statistics ==
These data show number of passengers movements into the airport, according to the Ghana Civil Aviation Authority.

Year	2019	2020	2021	2022
Passengers	0	0	350	969
Reference				

== Infrastructure ==
Ho Airport will cover 1,500 acres (610 ha). It will have a runway with dimensions 1,900 by 30 metres (6,234 ft × 98 ft) and a terminal that can handle 150,000 passengers annually.

== See also ==
- List of airports in Ghana
