= Bath salts (drug) =

Recreational drug often superficially resembling true bath salts

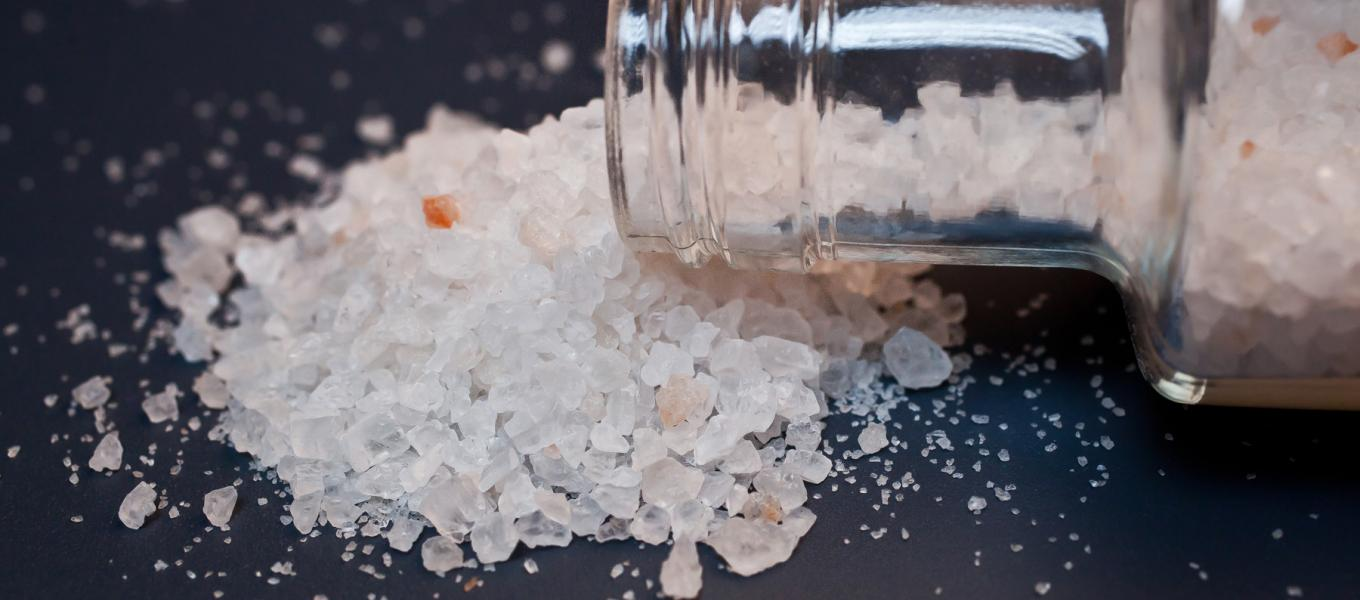
Crystalline bath salts

Bath salts (also called psychoactive bath salts, PABS) are a group of recreational designer drugs. The name derives from instances in which the drugs were disguised as bath salts. The white powder, granules or crystals often resemble Epsom salts, but differ chemically. The drugs' packaging often states "not for human consumption" in an attempt to circumvent drug prohibition laws. Additionally, they may be described as "plant food", "powdered cleaner" or other products.

== Drugs ==
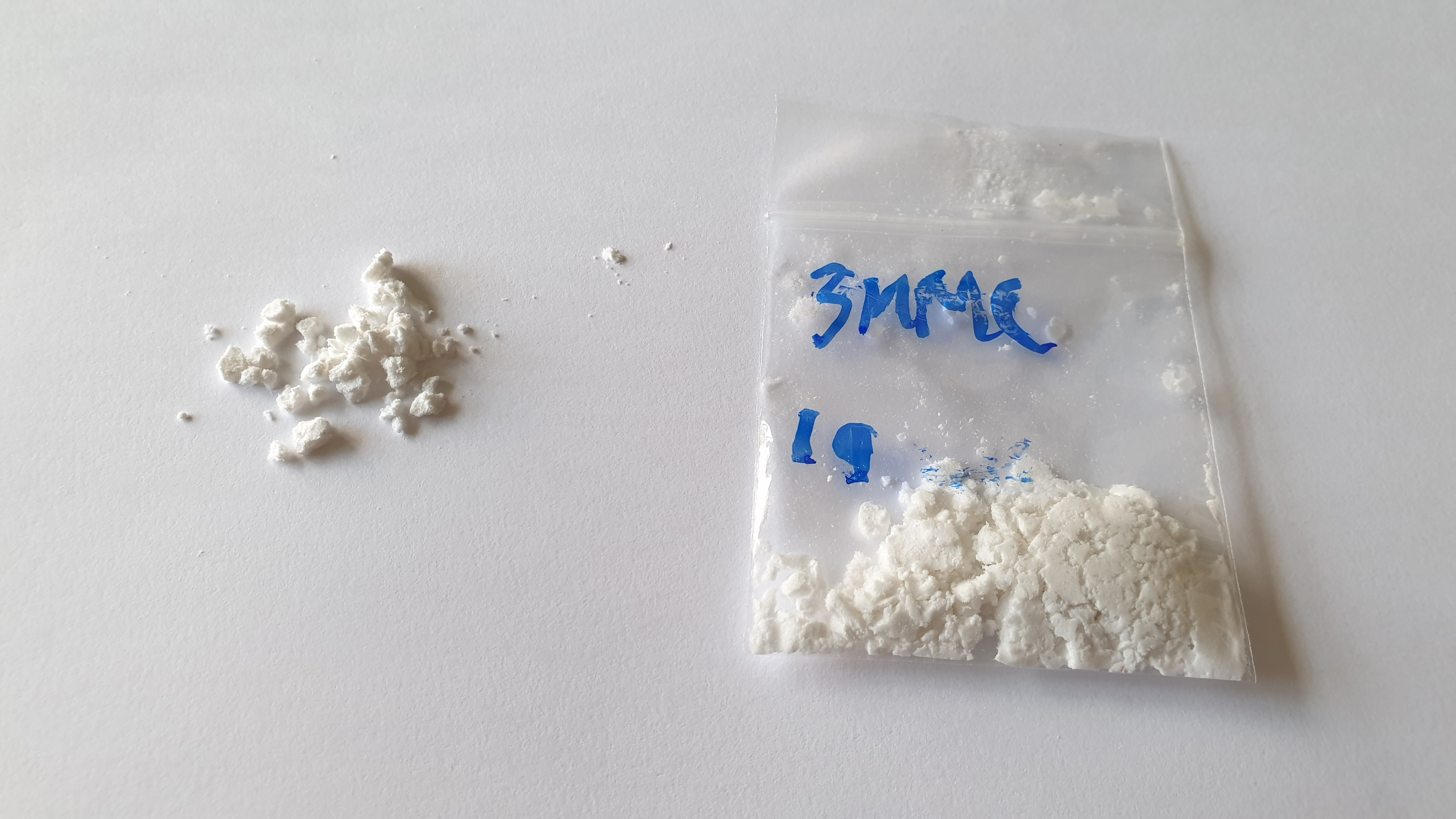
3-MMC has become a popular cathinone in recent years

Bath salts usually contain cathinones, typically methylenedioxypyrovalerone (MDPV, also known as "monkey dust", although this term can refer to MDPHP or α-PVP), methylone or mephedrone; however, the chemical composition varies widely and products labeled with the same name may also contain derivatives of pyrovalerone or pipradrol. In Europe the main synthetic cathinone is mephedrone, whereas in the United States MDPV is more common.

=== Pharmacology ===
Pharmacologically, very little is known about how bath salts interact with the brain and how they are metabolized by the body. Scientists are inclined to believe that bath salts have a powerful addictive potential and can increase users' tolerance. They are similar to amphetamines in that they cause stimulant effects by increasing the concentration of monoamines such as dopamine, serotonin and norepinephrine in synapses. They are generally less able to cross the blood brain barrier than amphetamines due to the presence of a beta-keto group that increases the compound's polarity.

== Usage ==
Bath salts can be ingested orally, snorted, smoked, plugged or injected. Bath salts can be detrimental to human health and can potentially cause erratic behavior, hallucinations and delusions. This is often due to their wakefulness-promoting effect, leading to insomnia.

=== Interaction with alcohol ===
Bath salts are often consumed concurrently with alcohol. A 2015 study has investigated the interrelation between mephedrone and alcohol, focusing on psychostimulant and rewarding effects. It showed that alcohol, at low (non-stimulant) doses, significantly enhances the psychostimulant effects of mephedrone. This effect is mediated by an increase in synaptic dopamine, as haloperidol, but not ketanserin, was capable of blocking the potentiation by alcohol.

=== Subjective effects ===
Bath salts come in a powdered or crystallized form that can be swallowed, smoked, injected, or snorted. Subjective effects are similar to MDMA or cocaine but with a duration of 5–6 hours. Both substances cause a rapid onset of action in the central nervous system, and stimulant toxicity.

== Adverse effects ==
Bath salt/monkey dust users have reported symptoms that include headache, heart palpitations, nausea, cold fingers, hallucinations, paranoia and panic attacks.

Other symptoms similar to those of stimulant overdoses include mydriasis, dyskinesia, tachycardia and hypertension.

In larger doses this class of substances can cause effects similar to those seen in cases of serotonin syndrome. Due to their rapid onset, synthetic cathinones are powerful reward/reinforcers, with high addiction potential. "Monkey dust", "bath salts" or "plant food" are often used at the same time as classical psychoactive drugs. Users who have overdosed often display symptoms of agitation, delirium, hallucinations, seizures, tachycardia, hypertension or hyperthermia.

== Detection ==
MDPV and other synthetic cathinones cannot be smelled by detection dogs and are not detected by typical urinalysis, although they can be detected in urine and hair using gas chromatography-mass spectrometry or liquid chromatography-mass spectrometry. Distributors may disguise the drug as everyday substances such as fertilizer or insect repellent.

== Prevalence ==
Little is known about how many people use bath salts. In the United Kingdom, mephedrone, commonly known as MCAT, is the fourth most commonly used illicit drug among nightclub goers after cannabis, MDMA and cocaine. Based on reports to the American Association of Poison Control Centers, use of bath salts in the United States is thought to have increased significantly between 2010 and 2012. The increase in use is thought to result from their widespread availability, undetectability on many drug tests, and sensationalist media coverage.

User's age tends to range from 15 to 55, with the average age being 28.

== Legal status ==
The drug policy of Canada since 2012 categorizes methylenedioxypyrovalerone (MDPV) as a schedule I substance under the Controlled Drugs and Substances Act, placing it in the same category as heroin and MDMA. Mephedrone and methylone were already illegal in Canada.

In the United Kingdom, all substituted cathinones were made illegal in April 2010, under the Misuse of Drugs Act 1971, but other designer drugs such as naphyrone appeared soon after and some products described as legal contained illegal compounds. To avoid being controlled by the Medicines Act, designer drugs such as mephedrone have been described as "bath salts", or other misnomers such as "plant food" despite the compounds having no history of being used for these purposes.

In July 2012, US federal drug policy was amended to ban the drugs commonly found in bath salts. Prior to that, bath salts were legal in at least 41 states. Prior to the compounds being made illegal, mephedrone, methylone, and MDPV were marketed as bath salts. The "bath salt" name and labels that say "not for human consumption" are an attempt to skirt the Federal Analogue Act, which forbids selling drugs that are substantially similar to drugs already classified for human use.

== Society and the media ==
Use of bath salts or monkey dust has spread through social media. Anecdotal reports of the drug increasing its users' pain thresholds while simultaneously giving them increased strength can largely be attributed to the emergency services and NHS staff. Such reports have been sensationalised by the press. In 2018, in Stoke-on-Trent, Monkey dust was reported to be an entirely new compound, when in fact preparations of MDPV and MDPHP or "bath salts" have been available since the early 2000s. The media have often used textual framing techniques to report on synthetic cathinone use among society's most vulnerable. Terms like "epidemic", "zombie attack" and more recently "incredible hulk" are often used when describing users. In August 2018, Staffordshire police said they were receiving around ten calls per day regarding monkey dust. However, it was not clear whether the incidents actually involved monkey dust, or a combination of substances.

Contrary to popular belief, during the investigation of the 2012 Miami cannibal attack, toxicologists found no trace of the components in bath salts during the autopsy of the attacker.

Bath salts or monkey dust were originally a research chemical or legal highs. Users would purchase the chemicals off the internet, ingest them and blog about the effects.

== History ==
Synthetic cathinones such as mephedrone, which are chemically similar to the cathinone naturally found in the plant Catha edulis (khat), were first synthesised in the 1920s. They remained obscure until the first decade of the 21st century when underground chemists rediscovered them and began to use them in designer drugs, as the compounds were legal in many jurisdictions. In 2009 and 2010 there was a significant rise in the use of synthetic cathinones, initially in the United Kingdom and the rest of Europe, and subsequently in the United States. Drugs marketed as "bath salts" first came to the attention of authorities in the United States in 2010 after reports were made to poison centers. In Europe, the drugs were predominantly purchased from websites, but in the United States they were mainly sold in small independent stores such as gas stations and head shops. In the US, this often made them easier to obtain than cigarettes and alcohol. Bath salts have also been sold online in small packets.

Hundreds of other designer drugs or "legal highs" have been reported, including artificial chemicals such as synthetic cannabis and semi-synthetic substances such as methylhexaneamine. These drugs are primarily developed to avoid being controlled by laws against illegal drugs, thus giving them the label designer drugs.

In the US, the number of calls to poison centers concerning "bath salts" rose from 304 in 2010 to 6,138 in 2011, according to the American Association of Poison Control Centers. Calls related to bath salts then began to decrease; by 2015, the number had declined to 522.

== See also ==
- Illegal drug trade
- Online illicit drug vendor
- Recreational drug use
