= Miami cannibal attack =

2012 attack in Florida, United States

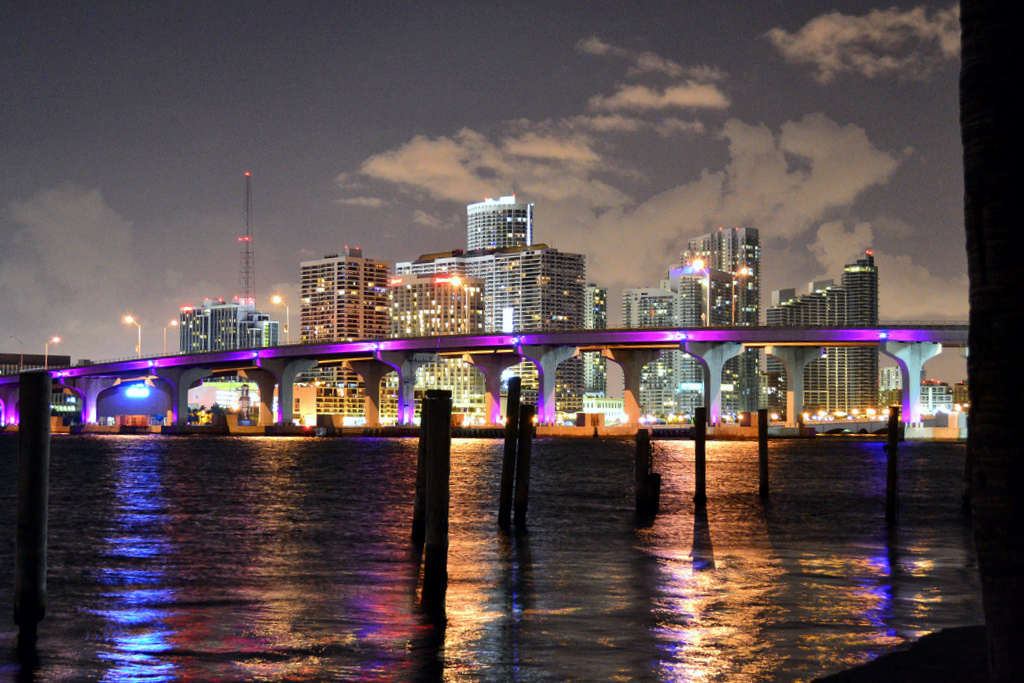
- Arts & Entertainment District neighborhood, where the attack took place.
- Location: 25.78728°N 80.18656°W; Miami, Florida, United States
- Date: May 26, 2012; 1:55 – 2:13 p.m. (EDT)
- Attack type: Cannibalistic
- Deaths: 1 (the perpetrator, shot)
- Injuries: 1 (Ronald Poppo, bitten)
- Perpetrator: Rudy Eugene

On May 26, 2012, Rudy Eugene attacked and maimed Ronald Poppo, a homeless man, on the MacArthur Causeway in Miami, Florida. During the 18-minute filmed encounter, Eugene accused Poppo of stealing his Bible, beat him unconscious, removed his pants, and bit off most of Poppo's face above his beard (including his left eye), leaving him blind in both eyes. As a result of the incident's shocking nature and subsequent worldwide media coverage, Eugene came to be dubbed the "Miami Zombie" and the "Causeway Cannibal". The attack ended when Eugene was fatally shot by an officer of the Miami Police Department.

Although friends and family filled in details of Eugene's life, the reason for the attack remains unclear. Eugene, 31, employed at a car wash at the time, was divorced and had a series of petty criminal arrests from age 16, with the last in 2009. While police sources speculated that the use of a street drug like "bath salts" might have been a factor, experts expressed doubt. Toxicology reports were not able to identify the drugs found in his stomach. Poppo, 65, a graduate of Manhattan's Stuyvesant High School, was homeless and had long been presumed dead by his estranged family.

== Attack ==
On the morning of May 26, 2012, 31-year-old Rudy Eugene drove to Miami Beach, Florida, to Urban Beach Week. After spending 30–40 minutes at the site, as filmed on security video in and around the car, he abandoned it around noon and began to cross the 3-mile-long (4.8 km) span of the MacArthur Causeway, stripping himself of his clothing and disposing of his driver's license as he advanced westward, according to eyewitnesses. His vehicle was eventually discovered and towed by Miami Beach police. Inside the car, police discovered a Bible and five empty water bottles, which they believed had been recently consumed.

Eugene, who eventually became completely naked, discarding even his shoes and his Bible at the crime scene, encountered 65-year-old Ronald Poppo at approximately 1:55 pm. Poppo had been lying underneath the elevated Metromover people mover viaduct when Eugene began to pummel him, strip him of his pants, and bite his face. The attack unfolded at the west end of the MacArthur Causeway, near the headquarters of The Miami Herald in the Arts & Entertainment District neighborhood of Downtown Miami. It was at first believed that neither Eugene or Poppo knew one another before their encounter, until a July 2012 publication revealed that Eugene had met Poppo while working for the homeless community of Miami. A passing cyclist, Larry Vega, came upon the scene and alerted authorities via 9-1-1. A few minutes later, Miami Police Department officer Jose Rivera arrived and, after doing a double take at the spectacle, warned Eugene to desist from attacking Poppo. Eugene ignored the officer's warnings and, instead, reportedly growled at him, then resumed biting his victim. The attack ended at 2:13 pm with Officer Rivera shooting Eugene once at first, which proved ineffective, and then another four times. The ordeal was captured by a security camera on The Miami Herald building. Surveillance video shows that the attack continued for 18 minutes before help arrived.

=== Aftermath ===
Poppo was admitted to Jackson Memorial Hospital in critical condition, with 75–80% of his face above the beard missing and his left eye gouged out. He underwent facial reconstruction surgeries that took months to complete, but he remained permanently disfigured and blind. To help with the costs, a fund was set up and has collected $100,700 since July 17, 2012. Poppo spoke to police, whom he thanked for saving his life, on July 19, explaining that Eugene, whom he hardly knew, approached him in a friendly manner but then, complaining he could not "score" at the beach and "souped up on something," started to talk about how they were going to die, accused Poppo of stealing his Bible, and, suddenly and without provocation, attacked and strangled him with wrestling holds, and then "plucked out" both his eyes.

Poppo lost his eyebrows, his nose, parts of his forehead and cheek, and his left eye, and was left totally blind due to the damage to his remaining right eye. He underwent numerous surgeries to repair the damage to his face. After rehabilitation, he put on 50 pounds (23 kg), and relearned how to dress, eat, shower, and shave. He was granted permission to stay at the medical facility indefinitely.

=== Inconclusive toxicology-investigation ===
Although the autopsy revealed no human flesh in Eugene's stomach, a number of undigested pills were discovered that have not been identified. Although police sources had speculated that the street drug "bath salts" might have been involved, preliminary toxicology reports were positive only for the presence of cannabis. Authorities did not necessarily find the negative results conclusive; Broward County Sheriff Al Lamberti expressed a belief that some new drug not yet tested for played a role, while nationally noted toxicologist Barry Logan said Eugene's behavior was consistent with "bath salts" and that toxicologists "are not testing for everything that may be out there." The director of toxicology at the University of Florida, Dr. Bruce Goldberger, said, "We are not incompetent. We have the tools, we have the sophistication and know-how. But the field is evolving so rapidly it is hard for us to keep track. It's almost as if it is a race we can never win."

== Perpetrator ==
Rudy Eugene
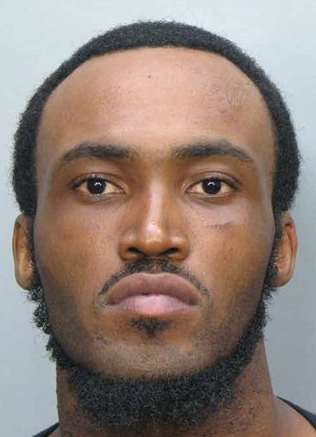
- Eugene in 2009.
- Born: February 4, 1981; Miami, Florida, U.S.
- Died: May 26, 2012 (aged 31); Miami, Florida, U.S.
- Other names: Causeway Cannibal; Miami Cannibal; Miami Zombie

Rudy Eugene (February 4, 1981 – May 26, 2012) was born at the Jackson Memorial Hospital in Miami, Florida. He was of Haitian descent through his immigrant parents, who divorced months after his birth. Eugene never made contact with his father, who died when Eugene was six. As a child he attended the Bethel Evangelical Baptist Church with his family on most Sundays. Eugene attended North Miami Beach High School in the 10th and 11th grades, and he played on its football team in the late 1990s. At the age of 17, he transferred to North Miami High School. After graduating, Eugene acquired money from different sources, such as selling CDs and jobs at McDonald's and in telemarketing. His last known employment was washing cars at a local automobile dealership. Eugene had expressed interest in establishing his own mobile car wash business.

Eugene's marriage, from 2005 to 2008, ended in divorce, with his wife reporting that there had been domestic violence in the relationship. The divorce was granted on January 8, 2008, and there were no children from their relationship. Eugene was estranged from his ex-wife until his death.

=== Criminal history ===
Eugene had been arrested eight times since he was 16, with the first arrest being for an assault in 1997. On February 25, 2004, Eugene broke a table, smashed items around the house, and pushed his mother out of the kitchen. Afterward, his mother told officers that he had said, "I'll put a gun to your head and kill you." This crime led to his serving probation for resisting an officer without violence. The remaining charges were mainly related to marijuana, which he had expressed a desire to quit. His final arrest was in September 2009.

== Victim ==
Ronald Poppo
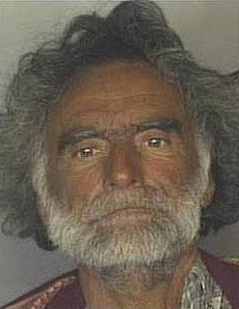
- Poppo in 2004.
- Born: Ronald Edward Poppo; May 17, 1947 (age 79); Brooklyn, New York, U.S.

Ronald Edward Poppo (born May 17, 1947) was born and raised in Brooklyn, New York. He attended Manhattan's prestigious Stuyvesant High School, where he was a member of the Latin Club and worked in the guidance office. A former classmate reported that, after high school, Poppo enrolled at nearby City College but he dropped out in late 1966. Poppo became homeless in early 1976. On May 24, 2012, two days before the attack, workers from the Miami Homeless Assistance Program discovered him and offered him the services of the Miami-Dade County Homeless Trust. However, Poppo declined assistance.

At the time of the attack, Poppo's family – including his daughter – had not heard from him in over 40 years. During that time, they assumed that Poppo was dead and suspected that he had killed himself. They were shocked to learn he was still alive at the time of the incident. Poppo has since completed treatment and was last residing in a Medicaid facility. He received nutritional and occupational therapy and started to learn to play the guitar.

== See also ==
- List of incidents of cannibalism
- Florida Man
