= University of Ghana Primary School Legon =

Location
- Noguchie Link; Legon; Greater Accra Region; Ghana; 05°38′34″N 00°11′17″W

Information
- Former names: The Demonstration School; University Primary School
- Motto: Honesty, Integrity, Diligence
- Established: 1955; 71 years ago
- Locale: University of Ghana Legon campus
- Headmaster: Eric Sifa
- Staff: 96
- Teaching staff: 71
- Gender: Coeducational
- Age: 3 to 14
- Enrollment: 2,221 (2020)
- Campus type: suburban
- Song: Lord Thy Word Abideth
- Sports: Football, Athletics
- Communities served: University of Ghana
- Website: ubsma.ug.edu.gh

The University of Ghana Primary School, now called the University Basic School, is a primary school located on the campus of the University of Ghana in Legon, Greater Accra Region, Ghana. It was established at a temporary location in Achimota in 1955 to educate the children of university faculty and staff.

== Academics and houses ==
The school is organised into four houses; Primary (P), Secondary (S) and University (U). Students in the lower school from age 6-12 have all their lessons in their house groups, however in the Upper School (JSS) students have lessons with other form groups.

There is a broad curriculum at all levels in the school. Students in the lower school study about ten subjects including a local language and French and students in upper school can expect to study at least twelve subjects including a local language and French.

== Student body ==
As of 2025, the school had a student population of 3,221 pupils.

== Traditions ==
The school is, in Ghanaian terms, a relatively old school and, as a result, has many traditions such as Friday morning spelling bees and math quizzes for pupils in the lower school. At the end of every academic year, students with the strongest results are awarded prizes at a ceremony held in the school's great hall. Also, there is an annual intersectional athletics and sports festival which has brought out many sports and athletics giants in Ghana.

== Academic success ==
The school is non-selective, however, the majority of students achieve strong results and are offered places at secondary schools including the Achimota School, Presbyterian Boys' Senior High School (Presec), Holy Child High School, Ghana, Wesley Girls' Senior High School, St. Augustine's College and Mfantsipim Senior High School.

== Headmasters ==
- Mrs. M. E. G. Black 1955-1957
- J. Andrews 1958-1960
- Janet Eavis 1961-1965
- K. O. Budu-Seidu 1970-1982
- E. Y. Attua-Afari 1983-1997
- Mrs. Esi Mensah -Bonsu 1997-2006
- Cecilia Morrison 2006-2013
- Alfred Codjoe-Allotey 2013-2022
- Mrs Christina Armah 2022-2024
- Mr Eric Sifa (Acting Head of School)
- Mrs Eunice Mensah

== Alumni ==
- Senyuiedzorm Awusi Adadevoh - photojournalist
- Bernard Avle - journalist and public speaker
- Kofi Barnes - judge of the Ontario Superior Court of Justice
- Kwaku Bediako - fashion designer
- Kwabena Boahen - professor of Bioengineering and Electrical Engineering at Stanford University
- William Boyd - author and screenwriter
- Kwei Quartey - author
- Cynthia Lamptey - Deputy Special Prosecutor of Ghana
- M.anifest - musician
- Michael McClelland - Professor of Microbiology and Genetics at the University of California, Irvine
- Audrey Esi Swatson - youngest Ghanaian commercial pilot

== See also ==
- Education in Ghana
- List of schools in Ghana

== External links and sources ==
- UBS, Legon | Home
