= Audrey Esi Swatson =

Ghanaian pilot

- Born: 23 February 1997 (age 29)
- Education: Mach1 Aviation Academy
- Alma mater: University of Ghana Basic school
- Occupation: Pilot
- Employer: Passion Air
- Organization: Excel Aviation

Audrey Maame Esi Swatson (born 23 February 23, 1997) is the youngest Ghanaian female pilot who has obtained a commercial license.

== Early life ==
Swatson hails from Saltpond, a town and the capital of the Mfantsiman Municipal District in the Central Region of South Ghana. She had her basic education at the University of Ghana Basic school and her Senior High Education at the Ghana Christian International High School (Dodowa) where she studied General Science.

Having completed Senior High School at the age of 18, she got admission at Mach1 Aviation Academy in Johannesburg (South Africa) to pursue her dream of becoming a pilot.

== Career ==
Maame Esi had her first solo flight with Mach1 Aviation Academy on 4 April 2016 when she was 19. She now holds a commercial pilot license to the standards of the South African Civil Aviation Authority. She has flown a total of 210 hours for the duration of being in school till she obtained her commercial license.

Swatson has set up an aviation company called Excel Aviation Company.

As of 2019, she is a first officer with Passion Air in Ghana, operating the De Havilland Canada Dash 8 aircraft.

== Honours ==
Audrey Esi Swatson was celebrated by the Ministry of Aviation. In 2016 she attended a sponsored conference in the USA as the first African female pilot by International Women in Aviation. She was nominated and honoured at The Future Awards Africa Prize for Young Person of the Year (Ghana)

She was awarded the Female Young Achiever at the 2022 Exclusive Men of the Year Africa Awards.
