= Kwaku Bediako =

Fashion Designer

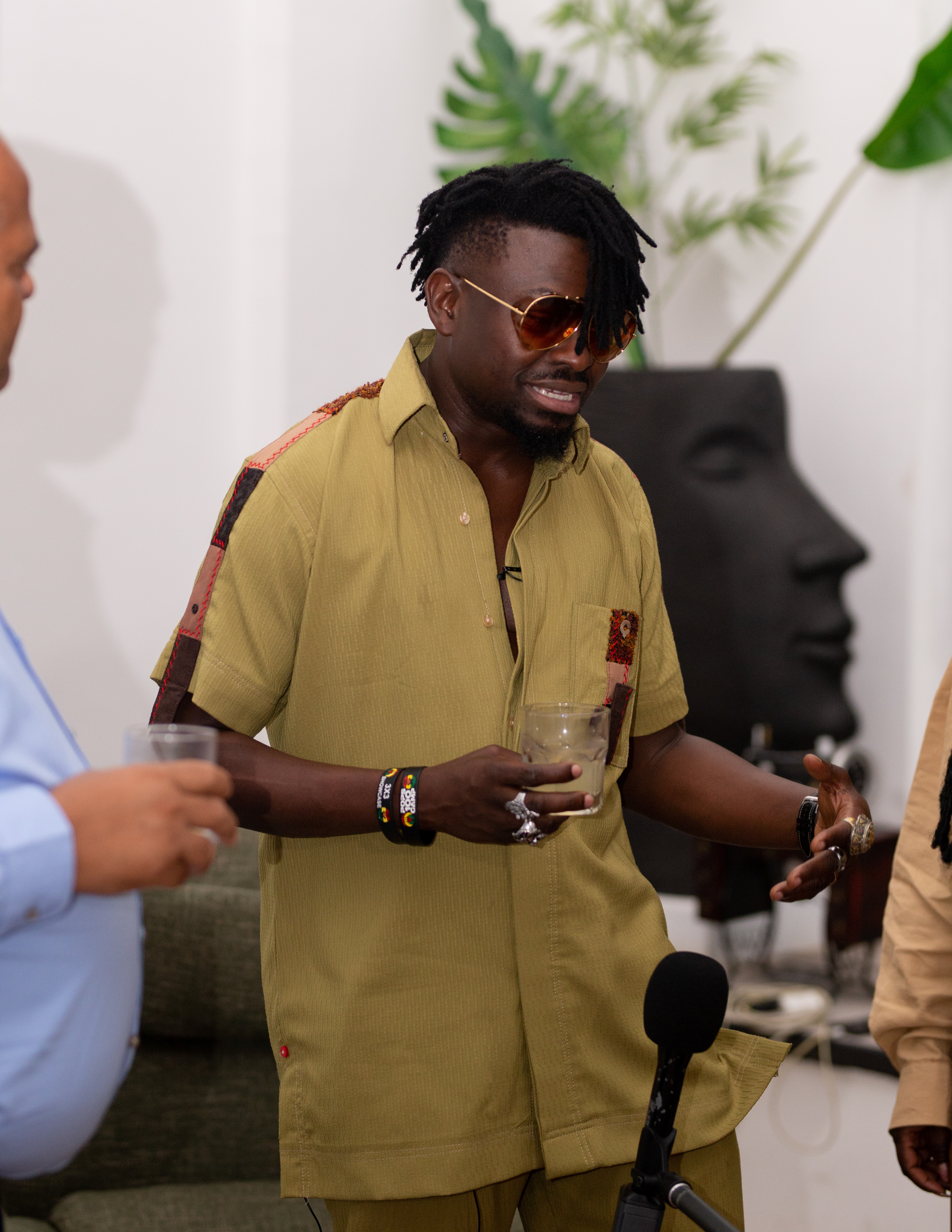
- Portrait of Kwaku Bediako
- Born: 7 May 1986 (age 40); Port Harcourt, Nigeria
- Education: University of Ghana Legon,
- Occupation: Fashion Designer
- Known for: Clothes Designing
- Label: Chocolate Clothes
- Spouse: Melissa Owusu
- Children: unknown
- Awards: Best fashion designer of 2018 EMY Africa Awards
- Website: www.chocolateclothesglobal.com

Kwaku Bediako Oduro also known as Kwaku Bediako (born 7 May 1986) is a Ghanaian contemporary fashion designer and founder of Chocolate Clothing now Chocolate Clothes Global.

== Early life and education ==
Kwaku was born in Port Harcourt, Nigeria before his parents moved to Ghana, where he attended University of Ghana Primary School Legon, then proceeded to Achimota School for his senior high school education. He furthered his education at the University of Ghana where he obtained a Bachelor of Arts and Science in Archaeology and Information Studies.

== Career ==
Kwaku after graduating from the University of Ghana set up an idea company called Checkmates, which provided marketing and business idea services. He evolved from writing movie scripts into designing clothes after encountering Mr. Philip Ayesu of GM Multiproconcepts and the CEO of XMEN Grooming through Checkmates.

He founded the fashion company, Chocolate Clothes now Chocolate Clothes Global which started operating as a clothing line for women in March 2013 but grew into a men's wear and accessories brand and later got incorporated in 2018. Although starting the clothing brand as a single-handedly operated business, Kwaku in recent times has unveiled that the growing fashion house is now capable of handling 1000 orders a month. Chocolate.

The decision to name his brand Chocolate Clothes Global was intended to illuminate the positive aspects of products originating from Ghana and Africa at large to reshape the perception of items made in Ghana, a revelation he made in an interview with CNN on African Start-up.

== Works ==
Kwaku won the best fashion designer of the year award during the 2018 EMY Africa Awards. He also won the maiden edition of Tailored African Fashion 2018, a project by Roberta Annan and African Fashion Fund in collaboration with Joy FM. His winning package comprised a flight to Paris as a speaker for the Change Now Summit as well as a visit to the French fashion house and luxury retail company, Louis Vuitton where he was to acquaint himself with Paris’ lavish products and brands. Through the African Fashion Fund, designs by Chocolate Clothes were featured in the Paris Fashion Week too.

Chocolate again clothed the Black Stars of Ghana during the 2014 World Cup.

Chocolate has been featured in the Congo Airways magazine, CNN African Voices in January 2016, Vogue Magazine in 2017 and BBC radio in 2018.

Designs by Chocolate were among the works of designers displayed at the banquet held by the President of Ghana in honour of His Royal Highness, the Prince of Wales and his wife Camilla Duchess of Cornwall during their five-day state visit in November 2018. Chocolate Clothes’ designs were showcased at the Fashion for Peace show in Paris, organized by the EU, African Fashion Fund, UN ITC-EFI and Ethical Fashion.

Chocolate designs have been displayed at fashion shows including Radiance Fashion Show and Glitz Africa Fashion Week.

Kwaku has worked with a number of Ghanaian and international celebrities, such as Steve Harvey, Idris Elba, Jamie Foxx, T.I., Cardi B, Jack Dorsey, Nasty C, Mr Eazi, Black Boy of GhOne, Majid Michel, Joe Mettle, M.anifest and Kwabena Kwabena patronize Chocolate Clothing. Jussie Smollett, better known as Jamal Lyon from Empire wore a piece by Chocolate Clothing in his music video Hurt People.

== Personal life ==
Kwaku is married to Melissa Owusu, the founder of the make-up brand, Aquia.
