= Michael McClelland (academic) =

Professor of microbiology and genetics

- Education: Accra Academy; King Edward VII School, Sheffield
- Alma mater: University of Bristol; University of Georgia; University of California, Berkeley; Columbia University Vagelos College of Physicians and Surgeons
- Scientific career
- Fields: Biochemistry; Microbiology; Genetics
- Institutions: University of Chicago; University of California, Irvine
- Doctoral advisor: Daniel Vapnek
- Other academic advisors: Charles Cantor; Allan Wilson

Michael McClelland is an academic. He is a professor of microbiology and genetics at the University of California, Irvine.

== Early life and education ==
Mcclelland had his early education at the University of Ghana Primary School, Methodist College, Belfast, and Boynton Junior High School in Ithaca, New York.

He had his secondary education at the Accra Academy from 1970 to 1972, and King Edward VII School, Sheffield from 1973 to 1975. He then proceeded to the University of Bristol, England, where he obtained his bachelor's degree in biochemistry in 1978.

In 1980, McClelland moved to the United States for his postgraduate studies at the University of Georgia, and graduated with a doctorate degree in 1983 with his research studies in Molecular and Population Genetics. He then continued at the University of California, Berkeley for a post doctoral research in Molecular Evolution under the supervision of Evolutionary Biologist, Allan Wilson from 1983 to 1984. After his post doctoral research at the University of California, Berkeley, McClelland entered the Columbia University Vagelos College of Physicians and Surgeons as a Lucille. P. Markey Scholar for a post doctoral research in Molecular Genetics under the direction of molecular geneticist Charles Cantor. His research lasted from 1984 to 1986.

== Career ==
McClelland taught Chemistry and Biology at Beveweerd School prior to entering the University of Georgia for his postgraduate studies. Following his second post doctoral research at the Columbia University Vagelos College of Physicians and Surgeons, he joined the University of Chicago's Biochemistry Molecular Biology Department in 1986 as an L. P. Markey Assistant Professor. In 1989, he became the Research Program Director of the California Institute Biological Research, San Diego, California.

He worked in this capacity until 1995 when he was appointed Professor and Director of Genomics and Bioinformatics at the Sidney Kimmel Cancer Center, San Diego, California.

In 2009, he was appointed Scientific Director of the Vaccine Research Institute. At the said period, McClelland doubled as a visiting researcher at the University of California, Irvine. In April 2011 he was made Adjunct Professor of the university's department of Pathology and Laboratory Medicine. He remained Director of Genomics and Bioinformatics at the Sidney Kimmel Cancer Center, San Diego, California until 2013 when he became a Professor at the Department of Microbiology and Molecular Genetics at the University of California, Irvine.

McClelland is a member of the UCI Cancer Centre. He served on the NCI (National Cancer Institute) Directors Challenge panel; twelve NCI RFA and ad hoc panels, and three USDA and NSF panels. He was the Chairman of Novel Technologies RFA Study Section, and an external reviewer for the Department of Education (UK).

== Research work ==
McClelland's works are in the areas of salmonella, cancer, prostate, breast and DNA Methylation. He serves on the Editorial board of the International Journal of Microbiology. He also works with companies to develop cancer prognosticators and cancer therapies. He served on the Editorial board of Nucleic Acids Research from 1992 to 2007. He has authored over 350 peer reviewed papers and his works have been cited over 40,000 times. He has 13 patents and his works are often featured in journals such as; Nature, Science, Nucleic Acids Research, Nature Genetics, Proceedings of the National Academy of Sciences, International Journal of Systematic and Evolutionary Microbiology, Trends in Genetics, Journal of Bacteriology, Theoretical and Applied Genetics, Molecular Microbiology, Genes & Development, and Genetics.
