= Edward Annan =

Ghanaian entrepreneur and politician (born 1945)

- Born: Edward Annan; 22 February 1945 (age 81); Kumasi, Ashanti Region
- Other names: Eddie Annan, Eddy Annan
- Education: Mfantsipim School; University of Bremen
- Occupation: Entrepreneur
- Known for: Passion Air
- Political party: National Democratic Congress

Edward Annan also as Eddie Annan (born 22 February 1945) is a Ghanaian entrepreneur, politician, and art collector. He is the co-owner and co-founder of the Ghanaian domestic airline Passion Air. He is a member of the National Democratic Congress. He is a former board chairman of the Korle-Bu Teaching Hospital.

== Early life and education ==
Edward Annan was born on 22 February 1945 to William Edward Annan and Beatrice Patricia Davis in Kumasi, Ashanti Region. He had his secondary school education at Mfantsipim School. He obtained a master's degree in mechanical engineering from the University of Bremen in Germany.

== Career ==
Annan returned to Ghana and established Masai Developers Limited, a development company in 1977. He subsequently added Masai Computers Limited which was being operated on IBM Dealership and Masai motors Limited, SEAT Car Dealership to his group of companies. In March 2012, he was appointed as the board chairman Korle-Bu Teaching Hospital by President John Evans Atta Mills. He later resigned in 2014 after agitations between him and the CEO of the hospital.

At the age of 73, in partnership with DAC Aviation of Kenya, he co-founded a Ghanaian domestic airline Passion Air in 2017. The airlines started operations in 2018.

== Politics ==
=== National Democratic Congress ===
Annan is a member of the National Democratic Congress (NDC) and is considered a financier of the party.

=== Presidential bid ===
Ahead of the 2008 elections, Annan declared his intention and stood for the NDC's presidential elections in 2006, he stood against then former Vice President John Evans Atta Mills, former minister Ekwow Spio-Garbrah and former minister Alhaji Mahama Iddrisu. On 21 December 2006, he lost the elections to the previous flag bearer for the 2000 and 2004 elections, John Evans Atta Mills. Mills won with a majority of 81.4% (1,362 votes) with Ekwow Spio-Garbrah coming in second with 8.7% (146 votes), Alhaji Mahama Iddrisu was third with 8.2% (137 votes), and whilst he was fourth with 1.7% (28 votes).

== See also ==
- Passion Air
