= Wa Airport =

Airport in Wa, Upper West, Ghana

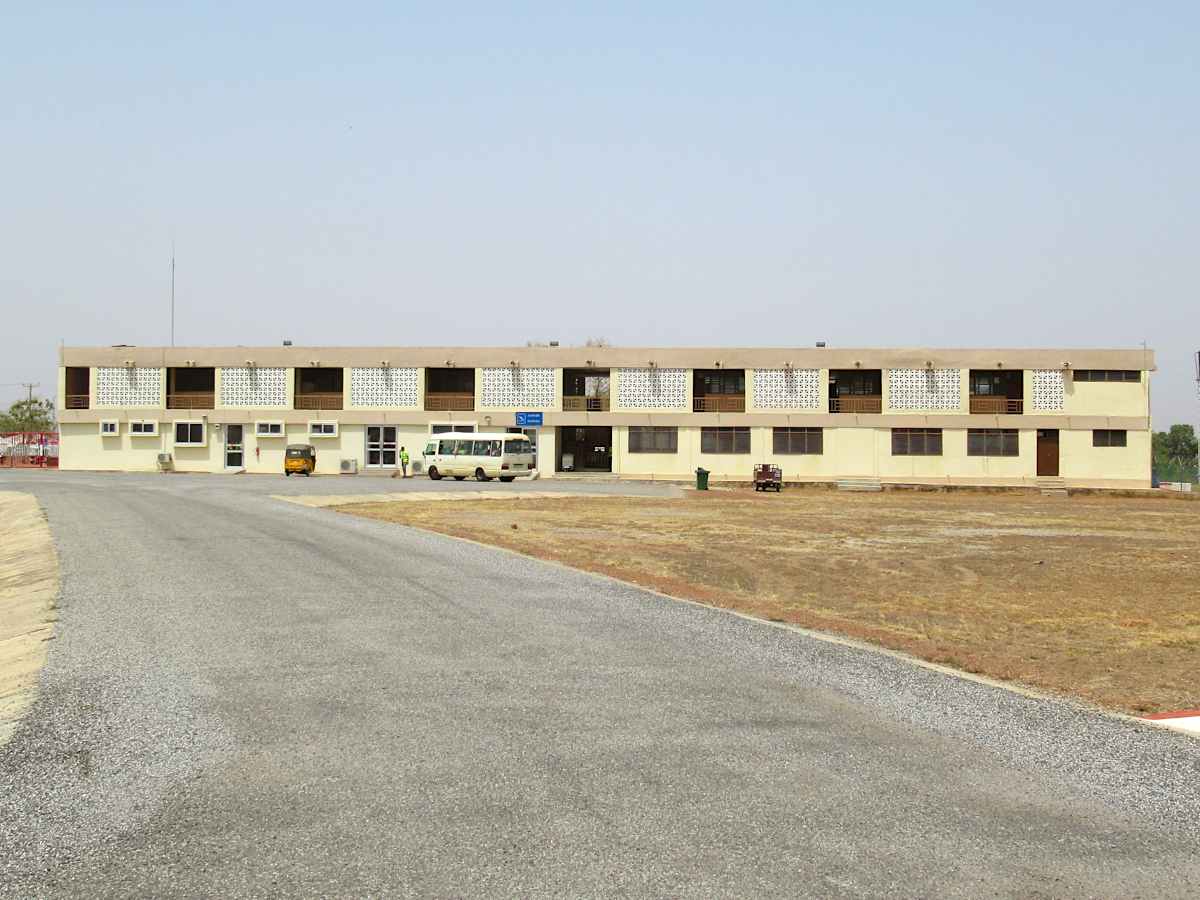
- IATA: WZA; ICAO: DGLW

Summary
- Airport type: Public
- Operator: Ghana Airports Company Limited
- Location: Wa, Ghana
- Elevation AMSL: 1,009 ft / 308 m
- Coordinates: 10°04′57″N 002°30′27″W

Map
- Location in Ghana

Runways
Direction	Length		Surface
Direction	m	ft	Surface
03/21	2,015	6,612	Asphalt

Statistics (2022)
- Passengers: 25,875
- Source: DAFIF

Wa Airport (IATA: WZA, ICAO: DGLW) is an airport serving Wa, a city in the Upper West Region of Ghana which is also its capital. The airport is operated by Ghana Airports Company Limited. It is the fourth busiest commercial airport in Ghana with over 23,352 passengers passing through in 2024.In 2025,24,970 passengers used the airport

== History ==
The land was acquired by the Government in 1958.

== Airlines and destinations ==
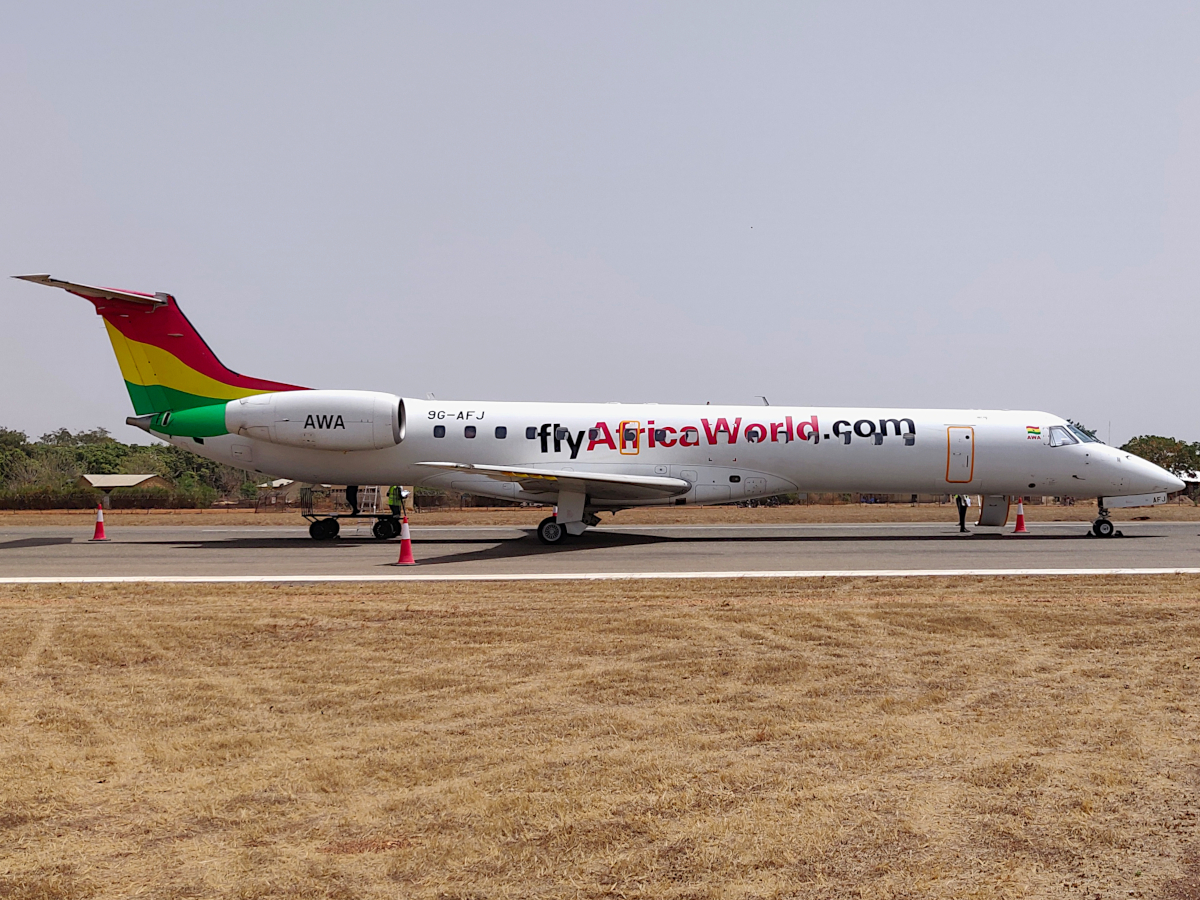
An Africa World Airlines aircraft at Wa Airport

The airport opened to scheduled commercial flight operations on 15 October 2019 with service by Africa World Airlines from Accra via Tamale using an Embraer 145 regional jet. Services were suspended in March 2020 due to the COVID-19 pandemic and remain suspended pending resolution of various safety challenges.

In December 2021, Passion Air announced three weekly services to Accra via Tamale. This service was subsequently increased to five weekly non-stop services using a Dash 8 aircraft.

=== Passenger ===
Airlines	Destinations
Passion Air	Accra, Kumasi

== Statistics ==
These data show number of passengers movements through the airport, according to the Ghana Civil Aviation Authority.

Year	2019	2020	2021	2022	2023
Passengers	653	2,698	4,696	25,875	25,357
Reference					
