= Kofi Barnes =

Ghanaian-Canadian judge

Honourable Justice Kofi N. Barnes

Judge of the Ontario Superior Court
- Incumbent
- Assumed office 8 February 2013

Personal details
- Born: Ghana
- Parents: Samuel Obiba Kwamina Barnes (father); Mrs. Cecilia Barnes (mother)
- Education: Osgoode Hall Law School
- Profession: Judge
- Known for: Expert in Therapeutic Jurisprudence
- Awards: Queen Elizabeth II Golden Jubilee Commemorative Medal; The African-Canadian Achievement Awards for Excellence in Law

Justice Kofi N. Barnes is a Ghanaian-born judge of the Ontario Superior Court of Justice in Canada.

== Early life and education ==
Kofi Barnes was born in Ghana to Samuel Kwamina Barnes and his wife Cecilia. His primary school education was at the University Basic School, Legon. He then attended the Presbyterian Boys' Senior High School also in Legon, Ghana. He originally wanted to train in medicine but switched to law after a friend suggested he could not get into law school. He obtained the BA (degree) from Trent University in 1988. He later completed the LL. B. degree at Osgoode Hall Law School, York University in 1991.

== Work ==
Barnes was admitted to the Ontario Bar in 1993. He started working with the Department of Justice in Canada in the same year. He was appointed the deputy director of the Federal Prosecution Service, Ontario Watch in 2002. He was involved in the design and implementation of Canada's first Drug Treatment Court in 1998. He became Canada's 25th African-Canadian judge on 8 February 2004, making him one of Canada's youngest judges at the time. He became the first African-born Justice to be appointed to the bench in Canada. Kofi Barnes is the founder of the Metro West Youth Community Restoration Court, the Durham Mental Health and Drug Treatment Court and is also co-founder of Canada's first Drug Treatment Court. He was Canada's first Drug Treatment Court prosecutor. Barnes was appointed as a Judge of the Ontario Superior Court on 8 February 2013.

== Honours ==
- Queen Elizabeth II Golden Jubilee Commemorative Medal in 2003 for his work on the Drug Treatment Court.
- Queen Elizabeth Silver Jubilee Commemorative medal
- Trent University Distinguished Alumni Award
- The Bryden Awards
- The African-Canadian Achievement Awards for Excellence in Law

== Books ==
- Barnes, Kofi N.; Connors, Tanya; Humphrey, Joanne; Schachar, Annie, eds. (28 November 2017). People, Places and Things: Inspirational Voices from Canada's Drug Treatment Courts. FriesenPress. ISBN 978-1460286500.
