= Ghana Airports Company Limited =

Company of Ghana

- Company type: State-owned entity
- Industry: Aviation
- Founded: 2006
- Headquarters: Accra, Ghana
- Key people: Pamela Djamson – Tettey (MD)
- Services: Airport management
- Website: Official website

Ghana Airports Company Limited (GACL) is a state-owned company with responsibility for developing, maintaining, planning, and managing airports in Ghana.

It was registered in 2006 and presently manages airports such as Accra International Airport, Nana Agyemang Prempeh I International Airport, Tamale International Airport, Wa Airport, Sunyani Airport, Ho Airport and other airstrips in Ghana. It was established by result of the decoupling of the existing Ghana Civil Aviation Authority (GCAA), which was in line with current trends that are in the aviation industry.

== History ==
The GACL assumed some functions of the GCAA and also managed the airports after the amendment of the GCAA Act 2004, which was renewed on 12 April 2007, and was licensed for continuous term of 7 years. The company started business on 1 January 2007.

== Functions of GACL ==
The functions of the company are to:

- Provide rescue and firefighting equipment and services at the airports.
- Provide safety and security for aircraft, passengers, and cargo in accordance with best international practices.
- Coordinate operations of agencies that provide support services at the airport to enhance overall efficiency.
- Facilitate aircraft, passenger, cargo, and mail movements.
- Develop, manage, and maintain airports and airstrips in Ghana.

== Projects ==
The GACL constructed Terminal 3 at the KIA in March 2016; it was completed in June 2018 and was opened to the public after 3 months.

It was claimed that about US$350 million was spent on the building of Terminal 3 and other projects at KIA. The construction of a new runway at the Tamale Airport also was claimed to have cost about US$130 million. Also, about US$25 million was used for the building of a new airport at Ho in the Volta Region of Ghana.

Airport City Accra is an urban development centered around Accra International Airport. The development is promoted by Ghana Airports Company Limited on the principle that airports have ceased to be mere terminals, but rather economic growth outlets to promote trade and generate employment.

== Controversies ==
It was alleged that the Government of Ghana, through the Ministry of Aviation, planned to hand over the company to a Turkish investor. The workers of GACL embarked on a demonstration to show their disapproval of privatization of the company.

The GACL clarified that travelers who did not pay for the COVID-19 test would be handed to state security officials. They made this statement after it was alleged that some people were treated badly in a video that was circulating on social media.

In over two years, the Ghana Airports Company Limited (GACL) accrued a total revenue exceeding $6.4 million which represent 6.8% from the operations conducted by Frontiers Healthcare Services at Accra International Airport (KIA) for COVID-19 testing.

== Challenges ==
Due to the impact of COVID-19, the company has been affected, as it is struggling with a lack of demand and increased unit charges. This has led to costs being passed on to other sectors of the travel value chain to cover up the space.
