= Drug Treatment Courts (Canada) =

Alternative voluntary specialized Canadian courts

Drug Treatment Courts are pre-sentence courts introduced in Canada in 1998 that provide individuals facing criminal charges driven by their substance abuse addiction (SAD) with a voluntary alternative to a prison sentence.

Participants in these intensive 18- to 24-month-long programs must plead guilty to the non-violent crimes of which they are accused.

== History ==
The first DTC in Canada was a pilot project in Toronto, Ontario in 1998 co-founded by Justice Kofi Barnes and financed with Justice Canada's Drug Treatment Court Funding Program. It was inspired by drug courts that originated in the United States in Miami, Florida in 1989. In Canada, the program expanded to Vancouver, British Columbia in 2001, Edmonton, Alberta in December 2005, Winnipeg, Manitoba in January 2006, and Calgary in 2007. By 2022, there were 14 DTCs in Ontario alone. The first DTC in Saskatchewan opened in Regina in 2006, the second in Moose Jaw in 2009, and the third in Battleford in 2025.

== Program model ==
Drug Treatment Courts (DTCs) in Canada are provincial and territorial courts that target adult, non-violent offenders charged under the Controlled Drugs and Substances Act or the Criminal Code where a substance use disorder was a factor in the offence. Applicants who wish to take part and enter a guilty plea are assessed by the Crown with input from the DTC team against the court's eligibility criteria, and most DTCs prioritize high-risk, high-need applicants.

Federally funded DTCs share three core elements which are, a dedicated court that monitors each participant's compliance and progress; drug treatment and case management; and community support, including referrals to services such as housing and employment. Participants appear in court regularly and are subject to random urine screening and the judge may respond with rewards for progress or sanctions for non-compliance. Completion criteria typically include compliance with program conditions, no further criminal convictions, indicators of social stability and a period of abstinence and those who complete the program may receive a non-custodial sentence. Program length, team composition and graduation requirements vary between sites.

== Legal framework ==
Section 720(2) of the Criminal Code allows a sentencing court with the consent of the Attorney General and the offender to delay sentencing so that the offender can attend a treatment program approved by the province under the court's supervision, such as an addiction treatment program. At the time of Justice Canada's 2015 evaluation, federal law also exempted offenders who completed a DTC program from certain mandatory minimum penalties under the Criminal Code and the Controlled Drugs and Substances Act.

== Federal funding ==
Justice Canada administers the Drug Treatment Court Funding Program (DTCFP), a contributions program under the treatment component of the National Anti-Drug Strategy. The Toronto (1998) and Vancouver (2001) courts began operating before the program was established. A 2009 evaluation recommended that provincial or territorial governments, rather than non-governmental organizations, be the funding recipients, and Justice Canada's 2015 evaluation reported that new funding agreements would be made with provinces and territories. By the time of the 2021 evaluation, the program had funding agreements with ten provinces and territories supporting 13 DTCs, with a total transfer payment budget of $18.7 million over the 2016–17 to 2020–21 evaluation period.
