= Sunyani Airport =

Airport serving Sunyani, Bono Region, Ghana

- IATA: NYI; ICAO: DGSN

Summary
- Airport type: Public
- Operator: Ghana Airports Company Limited
- Serves: Bono
- Location: Sunyani, Bono
- Opened: 1974
- Hub for: Passion Air
- Elevation AMSL: 1,014 ft (309 m)
- Coordinates: 07°21′42″N 002°19′43″W
- Website: gacl.com.gh

Map
- Location of airport in Bono, Ghana NYI (Africa)

Runways
Direction	Length		Surface
Direction	m	ft	Surface
07/25	1,400	4,800	Asphalt
- Source: DAFIF, official website, Google Maps.

Sunyani Airport (IATA: NYI, ICAO: DGSN) is a regional airport serving the city of Sunyani, Bono, Ghana. Thee airport is located about 3 km (1.9 mi) from the city centre and 110 km (68 mi) from Kumasi. It is own and operated by Ghana Airports Company Limited. The airport closed in 2015 and reopened in 2022 after the first phase of its rehabilitation project was completed. The airport handled 36,632 passengers in 2024 and 36,163 in 2025

== History ==
The airport was originally built in 1942 as an airstrip used by the Allies during World War II. The airstrip was later abandoned. In 1969, the Busia government started a project to upgrade the airstrip into an fully-fledged airport and it officially opened on 13 July 1974.

Due to reasons such as visible deterioration of the airport's overall infrastructural status, which included fractures and portholes seen on the runway, in 2016 the facility's operations were halted. In 2019, a rehabilitation project consisting of three phases commenced. The first phase of the project was anticipated to be completed in around nine months, but after delays as a result of the COVID-19 pandemic the due date was pushed back and it was completed in July 2022.

The second phase, which is estimated to cost around US$36,345,025.1, focuses on making the airport more suited for full commercial operations and accessibility for larger aircraft. This phase would extend the existing runway to a minimum length of 1,900 metres (6,200 ft) including the runway safety areas.

== Facilities ==
Accounting for all of the facilities below, the airport have the maximum capacity of handling around 100 passengers per hour.

=== Runway ===
The airport has one runway, which as of 2022 is currently undergoing upgrades during the airport's rehabilitation project. After the initial works, the airport's total runway's length is 1,520 metres (4,990 ft), consisting of 1,400 metres (4,600 ft) of paved surface and 60 metres (200 ft) of unpaved runway safety area on both ends of the runway.

== Airlines and destinations ==
Airlines	Destinations	Refs.
Passion Air	Accra	

== See also ==
- List of airports in Ghana

== Sources ==
- "Airport information for DGSN". World Aero Data. Archived from the original on 5 March 2019.
- Commissioning of Sunyani Airport Project (PDF) (Report). Ghana Airports Company Limited. 3 August 2022.
- "Sunyani Airport resumes operations after six years". Ghana Business News. 20 September 2022.
- "CATALOGUE OF INVESTMENT PROJECTS" (PDF). Government of Ghana. Ministry of Transport. December 2023.
- "Sunyani Airport" (Map). Google Maps.
- "Nana Addo commissions phase 1 of Sunyani Airport". Citi Newsroom. 3 August 2022.
