= Passion Air =

Commercial airline in Ghana

PassionAir
IATA	ICAO	Call sign
OP	DIG	PASSION
- Founded: 2017
- Commenced operations: 2018
- Operating bases: Accra International Airport
- Fleet size: 5
- Destinations: 6
- Headquarters: Accra, Greater Accra, Ghana
- Key people: Edward Annan (Founder), Billionaire Boateng, Duncan Sambu
- Website: flypassionair.com

Pisces Aviation (dba as PassionAir) is a domestic airline of Ghana with its head office in Accra, Ghana, and its main hub at Accra International Airport in Accra.

It is the largest domestic airline in Ghana, having transported 386,294 passengers in 2023, and holds a 51% share of the domestic market as of 2023.

== History ==
Passion Air was founded as DAC International Airlines (Ghana) by notable local businessman Edward Annan, in partnership with DAC Aviation of Kenya. The company was founded in 2017 and achieved its Air Operator Certificate in December that year. Flight operations commenced under the PassionAir brand in August 2018 using a single Bombardier Dash 8 Q400.

On 20 February 2021, Passion Air operated its first flight with an all female crew from Accra to Tamale. The airline is also notable for hiring Ghana's youngest female pilot, Audrey Esi Swatson.

== Fleet ==
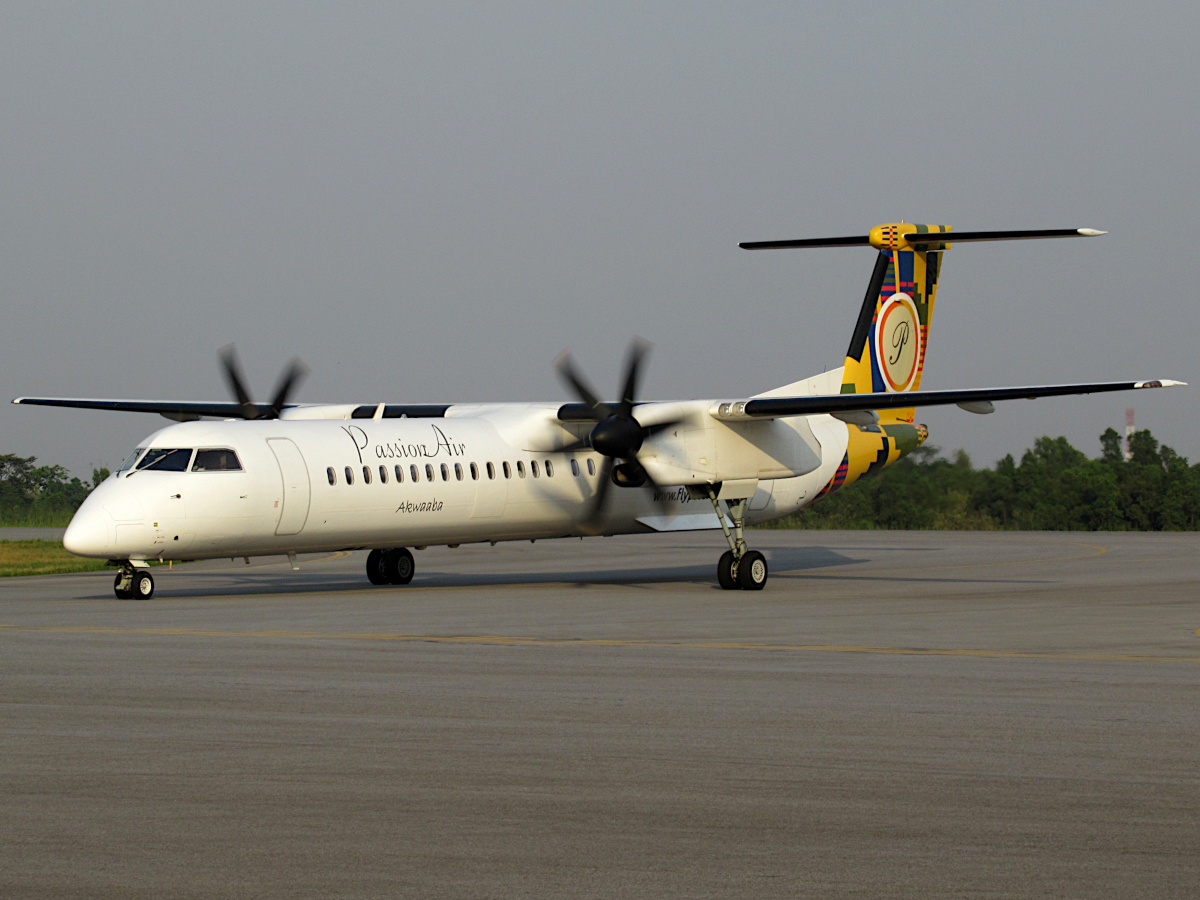
Passion Air Bombardier Q400

=== Current fleet ===
As of July 2026, Passion Air operates the following aircraft:

PassionAir fleet
Aircraft	In Service	Passengers		
Aircraft	In Service	B	E	Total
Bombardier Dash 8 Q400	2	0	78	78
Bombardier Dash 8 Q300	3	0	50	50
Total	5			

=== Former fleet ===
As of August 2025, Passion Air operated 3 De Havilland Canada DHC-8-Q300 and 2 De Havilland Canada DHC-8-Q400.

== Destinations ==
PassionAir operates the following scheduled services as of March 2022.

Ghana

- Accra – Accra International Airport
- Kumasi – Kumasi Airport
- Tamale - Tamale Airport
- Takoradi – Takoradi Airport
- Wa - Wa Airport
- Sunyani – Sunyani Airport

Destinations map
Destinations for Passion Air
Red = Year-round destination
Green = Seasonal destination
Blue = Future destination

== Incidents ==
- On 10 October 2018, a PassionAir Bombardier Dash 8 from Kumasi to Accra experienced a taxiway excursion incident upon arrival. No injuries were reported, but the aircraft was grounded for further investigation.

== Brand Ambassadors ==
1. Caroline Sampson - A Ghanaian media personality
