= Takoradi Airport =

Military airport in Ghana

Takoradi Airport Takoradi Air Base
- IATA: TKD; ICAO: DGTK

Summary
- Airport type: Military
- Owner: Ghana Air Force
- Operator: Ghana Air Force
- Location: Takoradi, Western Region
- Elevation AMSL: 22 ft (6.7 m)
- Coordinates: 04°53′45″N 001°46′29″W

Map
- Location in Ghana

Runways
Direction	Length		Surface
Direction	m	ft	Surface
03/21	1,751	5,745	Asphalt
- Source: DAFIF; Runway 21 has a 200 metres (656 ft) displaced threshold.

Takoradi Airport (IATA: TKD, ICAO: DGTK) is an airport in Sekondi-Takoradi, a city and capital of Western Region southern Ghana. It is the fourth busiest airport in Ghana, with 124,930 passengers in 2024.Passenger traffic further increased to 133,069 in 2025

== History ==
=== Second World War: Takoradi air route ===
During World War II, the United States Army Air Forces Air Transport Command Trans-Africa Ferry Route, was a major transportation link between the Atlantic Ocean port of Lagos in Nigeria, and the Sudan. This was one of the main routes for Lend-Lease aircraft sent to Russia, and other supplies sent to British forces in Egypt and the Middle East. The route had been pioneered in 1936 by Imperial Airways, but was dramatically expanded during the war.

Takoradi Airport was a major refueling stop between Robertsfield, the airport the U.S. built to serve Liberia's capital Monrovia, and Apapa Airport, Nigeria. Takoradi Airport was used as a Royal Air Force station known as "RAF Takoradi", where crated aircraft, that had been shipped over the Atlantic, were assembled prior to being flown to operational areas in North Africa. 26 Squadron SAAF was also based in Takoradi during World War II flying Vickers Wellington bombers on anti-submarine and convoy protection patrols over the Atlantic. A number of South African Air Force airmen are buried in the Takoradi European Public cemetery adjoining the Airport.

== Airlines and destinations ==
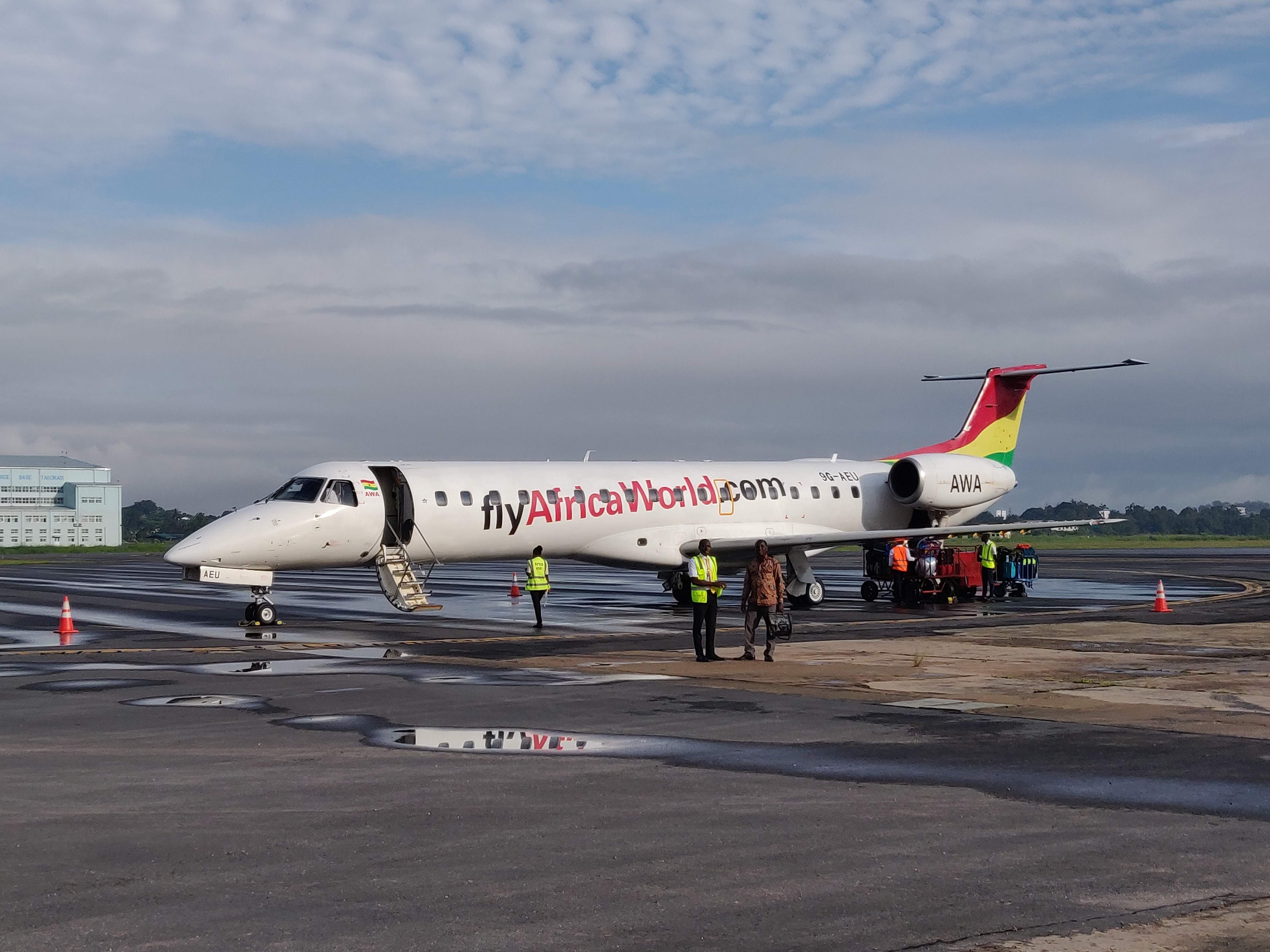
Africa World Airlines Embraer ERJ-145 at Takoradi Airport

=== Scheduled flights ===
Scheduled air services from Takoradi Airport are provided by:

Airlines	Destinations
Africa World Airlines	Accra
Passion Air	Accra

=== Offshore support ===
Takoradi Airport serves as the primary shore base for helicopter transfer to offshore oil platforms in Ghana's Jubilee Oil Field.

=== Military ===
Ghana Air Force's 1 Squadron operating Harbin Z-9H and Flight Training School (FTS) operating Diamond DA-42 are based out of Takoradi Air Base.

== Accidents and incidents ==
- On 24 April 1969, Douglas C-47A 9G-AAF of Ghana Airways crashed on approach to Takoradi Airport, killing one passenger of the 33 passengers and crew. The aircraft was operating a domestic scheduled passenger flight from Kotoka Airport, Accra.
- On 8 May 2014, a Eurocopter AS365 Dauphin helicopter operated for Volta River Aviation crashed off the coast of the Western Region en route from Takoradi Airport to the Jack Ryan oil rig. Four out of the eight persons on board were killed in the accident. The investigation revealed that an oil leak had resulted in a fire on board.
