= List of Nigerian Islamic religious leaders =

Imams in Nigeria

This is a list of notable Islamic religious leaders in Nigeria.

== Sunni ==
=== Salafis ===
- Abubakar Gumi
- Dr. Ahmad Ibrahim BAMBA
- Ja'afar Mahmud Adam
- Muhammad Auwal Albani Zaria
- Sheikh AbdurRazzaq Yahaya Haifan
- Dr.idris Abdulaziz dutsen tanshi
- Isa Ali Pantami
- Sani Yahaya Jingir
- Ahmad Sulaiman Ibrahim
- Abdullahi Bala lau
- Isma'ila Idris
- Aminu Ibrahim Daurawa
- Kabiru gwambe
- Sulaiman Muhammad Adam
- Yakubu Musa Katsina
- Sheikh Ahmad tijjani guruntum
- Sheikh Murtala Asada
- Prof.Sani Umar R/Lemo
- Dr.Abdullahi Usman Gadon Kaya
- Sheikh Najeem Ibn Sulaiman
- Dr. Bashir Aliyu Umar
- Ahmad abubakar gumi

=== Sufist ===
- Abduljabbar Nasiru Kabara
- Qaribullah Nasiru Kabara
- Dahiru Usman Bauchi
- Nasuru Kabara
- Sa'adu Abubakar
- Siddiq Abubakar III
- Muhammed Bello
- Abdullahi dan Fodio
- Usman dan Fodio
- Ibrahim Ibn Saleh al-Hussaini
- Modibbo Raji
- Sanusi Lamido Sanusi
- Usman Umar Kibiya
- Ibrahim Ahmad Maqary

== Shi'ites ==
- Ibrahim Zakzaky
- Qasim Umar Sokoto
