= Muhammad Auwal Albani Zaria =

Nigerian Islamic scholar

Sheikh Muhammad Auwal Adam
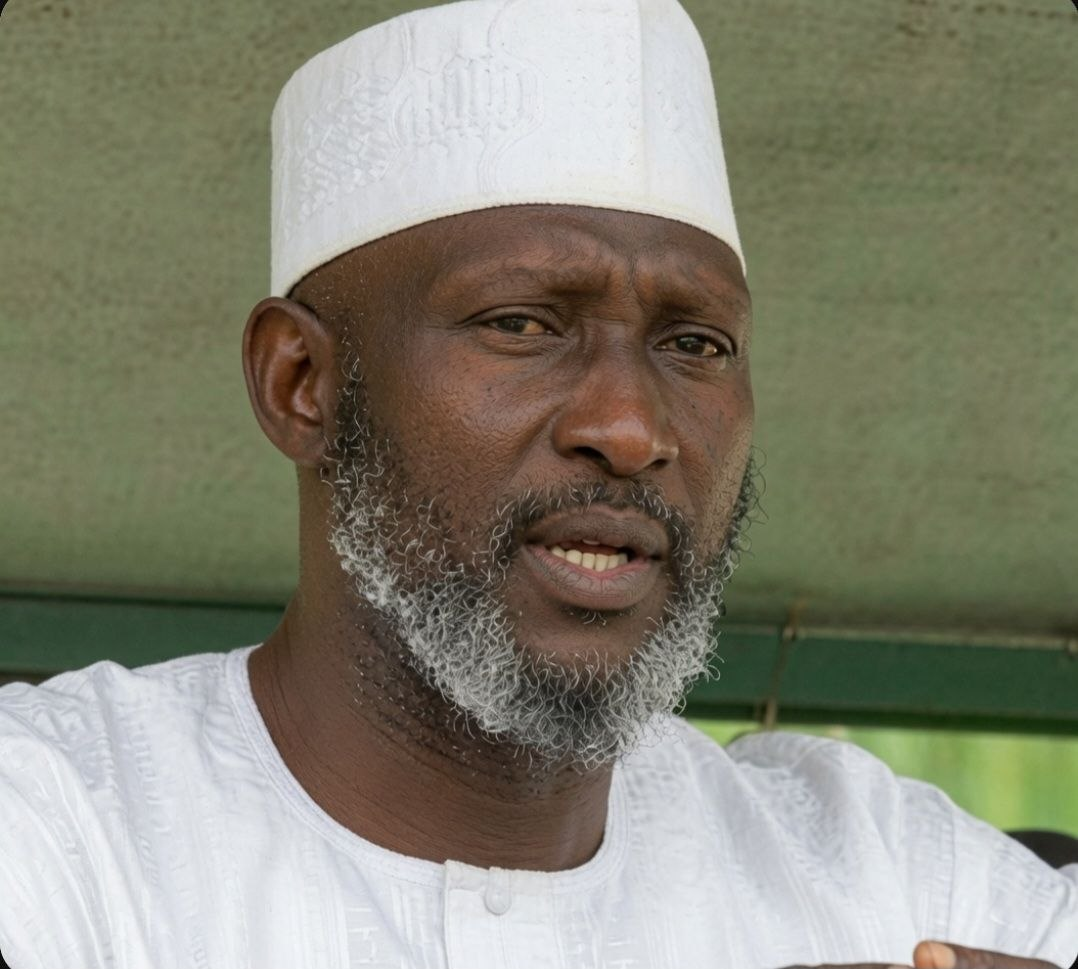
- Title: Sheikh Muhammad Auwal Adam (Albani Zaria)

Personal life
- Born: September 27, 1960 Zaria, Kaduna State
- Died: February 1, 2014 (aged 53) Hospital Zaria
- Cause of death: Assassination
- Resting place: JIBWIS Dambo Cemetery
- Era: Modern era
- Region: Northern Nigeria
- Main interest(s): Hadith and Tafsir
- Notable idea(s): Quran and Hadith bases on salafus-salih
- Notable work: Eradicating Bidi'ah and Shi'ites. He was the leader of Salafiyyah in Nigeria
- Education: Bayero University Kano, American University of Nigeria, Ahmadu Bello University
- Occupation: Mufassir, Islamic cleric, Teacher, and Mufassir, Tailor.

Religious life
- Religion: Islam
- Denomination: Sunni
- Jurisprudence: Quran and Sunnah
- Tariqa: Not interested
- Movement: Quran and sunnah according to the teachings of Salafiyyun

Muslim leader
- Influenced by: Ibn Taymiyyah, Sheikh Muhammad Nasiruddin Al-Albani and Abubakar Gumi

Muhammad Auwal Adam (also known as Albani Zaria; 27 September 1960 – 1 February 2014) was a Nigerian Islamic scholar who specialised in Hadith and Fiqh. He also studied Islamic law, mass communication, telecommunications engineering and information and communications technology. He was a leading figure in the Salafi movement in Nigeria and was regarded by many of his contemporaries as one of the most influential Salafi scholars of his generation.

He was among the first scholars in Nigeria to popularise the use of the term “Salafiyah” among a generation of students and teachers of Islamic knowledge.

== Early life and education ==
Muhammad Auwal Adam was born on 27 September 1960 in Zaria, Kaduna State. He received his primary education locally and later attended Barewa College. He studied mass communication at Bayero University, Kano, and obtained a degree in information technology from the Federal University of Technology, Yola (now Modibbo Adama University). At the time of his death he was a postgraduate student in the Department of Electrical Engineering at Ahmadu Bello University, Zaria.

Alongside his secular studies he devoted many years to the study of Islamic sciences, particularly Hadith. He adopted the nickname “Albani” in reference to the Syrian-Albanian Hadith scholar Muhammad Nasiruddin al-Albani. His students were spread across northern Nigeria, especially in the states of Kaduna, Kano, Katsina, Plateau and Bauchi, as well as in other parts of Nigeria and neighbouring West African countries.

== Career and activities ==
Adam established and led the Daarul Hadeethis-Salafiyyah school and the Markazu-Salafiyya centre in Tudun Wada, Zaria. He also founded the Albaniy Science Academy in the Gaskiya layout of Zaria. He delivered regular weekly lectures and annual Tafsir sessions, focusing on Hadith and the interpretation of the Qur’an according to the understanding of the early generations of Muslims (salaf).

He combined his religious teaching with professional work in information technology and telecommunications. He was known for travelling to other states in northern Nigeria and occasionally to neighbouring countries to deliver lectures.

== Notable works ==
Adam’s teaching and recorded lectures focused on the study of authentic Hadith collections, the rejection of religious innovations (bid‘ah), and the promotion of a Salafi understanding of Islam. Recordings of his lessons on Sahih al-Bukhari and other classical texts remain widely circulated among his students and listeners.

== Death ==
On the evening of 1 February 2014, Adam delivered his regular Tafsir lecture at Markazu-Salafiyya in Tudun Wada, Zaria. After the lecture he drove home with one of his wives and some of his children. Near Magume junction gunmen attacked the vehicle, smashed the windscreen and opened fire. Adam was shot and later pronounced dead at St. Luke Hospital in Wusasa, Zaria. His wife and one of his sons also died in the attack.

Boko Haram leader Abubakar Shekau later claimed responsibility for the killing.

The killing was widely reported in Nigerian media. Premium Times described him as a prominent Islamic preacher whose death, together with that of his wife, shocked many in Zaria and beyond.

== See also ==
- Sheikh Abubakar Gumi
- Sheikh Ja'afar Mahmud Adam
- Sheikh, Dr. Ahmad Bamba
- Prof. Isa Ali Pantami
- Sheikh, Dr. Idris Abdul'aziz Dutsen Tanshi
- Sheikh, Dr. Ahmad Abubakar Gumi
- Sheikh Abdullahi Bala Lau
- Sheikh, Dr. Kabiru Gombe
- Sheikh Sani Yahaya Jingir
- Sheikh, Dr. Aminu Ibrahim Daurawa
- Izala Society
