= Kabir Ahmad Azare =

Islamic scholar and educator (1960–2023)

Sheikh Kabir Ahmad Azare
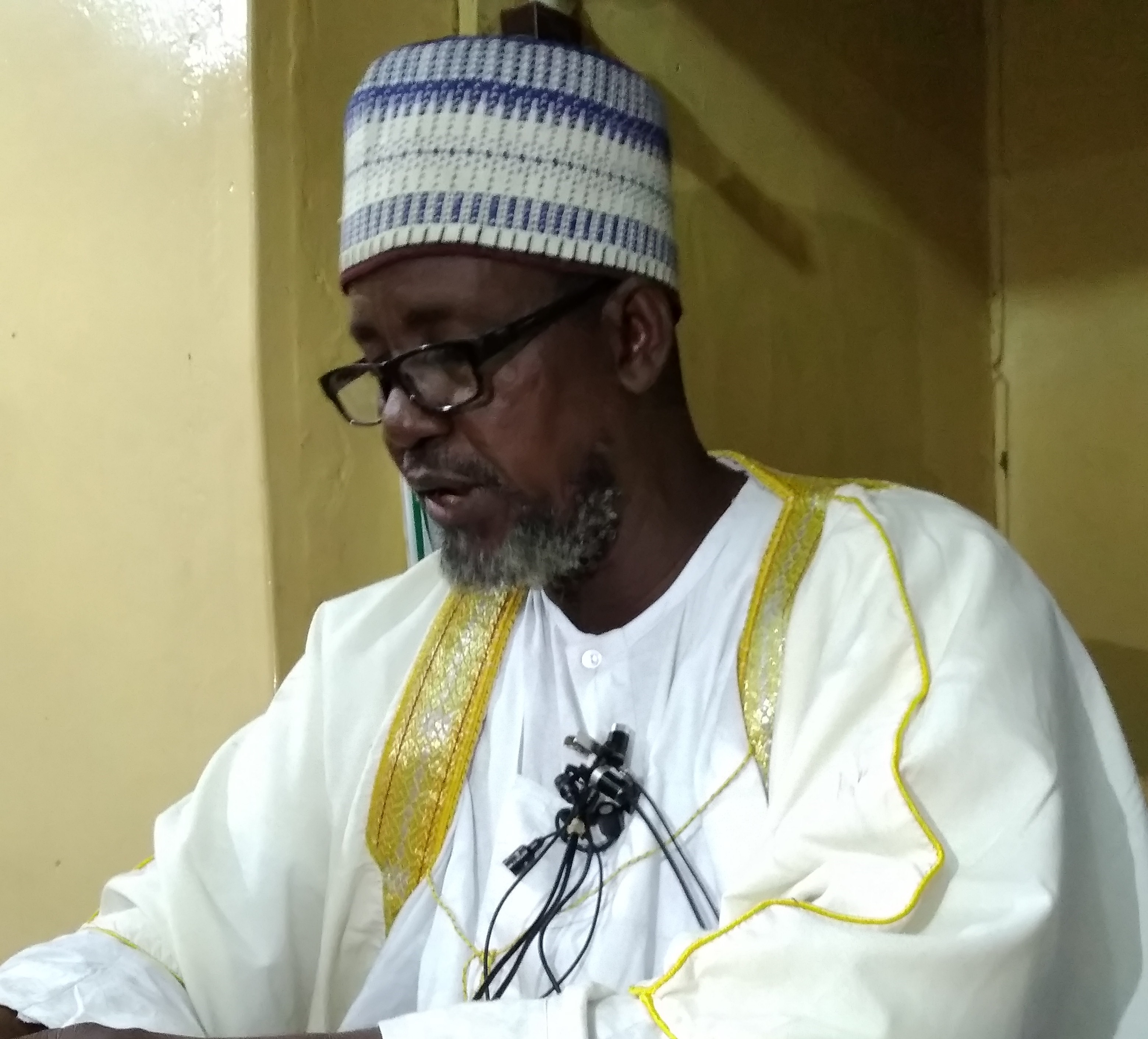

Chairman Council of Ulama', IZALA Katagum Zone
- Title: Sheikh

Personal life
- Born: 11 February 1960 Azare, Bauchi State
- Died: 27 April 2023 (aged 63) FUHSATH Azare
- Cause of death: Short Illness
- Spouse: 3
- Children: 29
- Region: Northern Nigeria
- Main interest(s): Fiqh, Hadith and Tafsir
- Notable work: Eradicating Bidi'ah
- Occupation: Mufassir, Islamic Cleric, Teacher and Religious Leader

Religious life
- Religion: Islam
- Denomination: Sunni
- Jurisprudence: Maliki
- Movement: Malikiyya

Muslim leader
- Students: Kabiru Gombe
- Influenced by: Malik Ibn Anas and Abubakar Gumi

Kabir Ahmad Azare (11 February 1960 – 27 April 2023) was a Nigerian Islamic scholar, preacher, and leader of the Council of Ulama' of JIBWIS Katagum Zone. He was a follower of the Sunni school of thought and a prominent member of the Jama'atu Izalatil Bid'ah Wa'Ikamatis Sunnah (JIBWIS) movement. He was known for his vast knowledge of the Quran, Hadith, Fiqh, and Arabic language, as well as his eloquent lectures.

== Early life and education ==
Kabir Ahmad Azare was born on 11 February 1960 in Azare town of Katagum Local Government, Bauchi State, Nigeria. He started his Islamic education at a young age under the guidance of his father and other local scholars, he memorized the entire Quran with Malam Baban Ma'ruf, a renowned Quranic reciter and teacher.

He attended elementary school in Azare town and then moved to Katagun of Zaki Local Government for his secondary school education. He graduated from the Government Secondary School (Kuranga) in 1979. He then proceeded to the Aminu Kano College for Legal and Islamic Studies, where he obtained a diploma in Sharia and Civil Law in 1982. He also enrolled in the Bayero University Kano for a degree in Islamic Studies, but he did not complete it due to his involvement in preaching activities.

== Islamic scholarship and preaching ==
Azare was passionate about seeking and spreading Islamic knowledge. He traveled to various places in Northern Nigeria to learn from different scholars and to teach and preach to the masses. He studied the explanation of the Quran with Malam Ɗan Gambo, the cousin of Sheikh Nasiru Kabara, the founder of the Qadiriyya movement in Nigeria. Malam Ɗan Gambo also gave him permission to translate the Quran into Hausa language any time and any place he found himself.

He studied Fiqh, Arabic language, Usul al-Fiqh, and Hadith with several eminent scholars. He also studied Nahwu (Arabic grammar) with Sheikh Abdulkarim Tahir, the Chief Imam of Kitabu Was-Sunnah Masjid Azare, and the late Sheikh Dr. Ahmad Bamba, a PhD holder and lecturer of Arabic and Islamic Studies at Bayero University Kano. During his Islamic education journey, he studied together with Late Sheikh Ja'afar Mahmud Adam, Dr. Ibrahim Jalo Jalingo, Sheikh Muhammad Bn Uthman Kano, and Sheikh Aminu Ibrahim Daurawa among others.

He was a staunch follower of the Sunni school of thought and a loyal disciple of Sheikh Abubakar Mahmud Gumi, the leader of the JIBWIS movement in Nigeria. He was appointed as the Chairman of the Council of Ulama' of JIBWIS Katagum Zone, a position he held until his death. He was also a member of the National Executive Council of JIBWIS and a close associate of Sheikh Abdullahi Bala Lau, the National Chairman of JIBWIS.

He delivered lectures and sermons on various topics of Islamic jurisprudence, theology, history, and ethics. He was known for his eloquence, clarity, charisma, and humor. He successfully taught and delivered the following books to thousand of his followers in different mosques; Ramadan Tafsir of the complete Qur'an (three times), Sifatu Salatin Nabiyy, Ahkaamul Jana'iz, Arrijaalu Wan-Nisa'u Haular Rasuul, Nurul Albaab (Usmanul Fodi), I hya'ussunah Wa Ikhmadul Bidi'a, Kitabut Tauhiid, Riyadus Swalihiin, Al'akhdari, Al'ashmawiy, Iziyya, and Ar-Risaala. He was a vocal critic of religious extremism, sectarianism, and innovation. He advocated for peace, unity, and tolerance among Muslims and other faiths. Among his notable students are Sheikh Kabir Haruna Gombe.

== Personal life and death ==
Azare was married to three wives and had 29 children. He died on 27 April 2023 after a brief illness. He was buried in his hometown of Azare, according to Islamic rites. He was described as a great loss to the Muslim Ummah and a source of inspiration for many.
