= Ja'afar Mahmud Adam =

Nigerian Islamic scholar (1960–2007)

Sheikh Ja'far Mahmud Adam
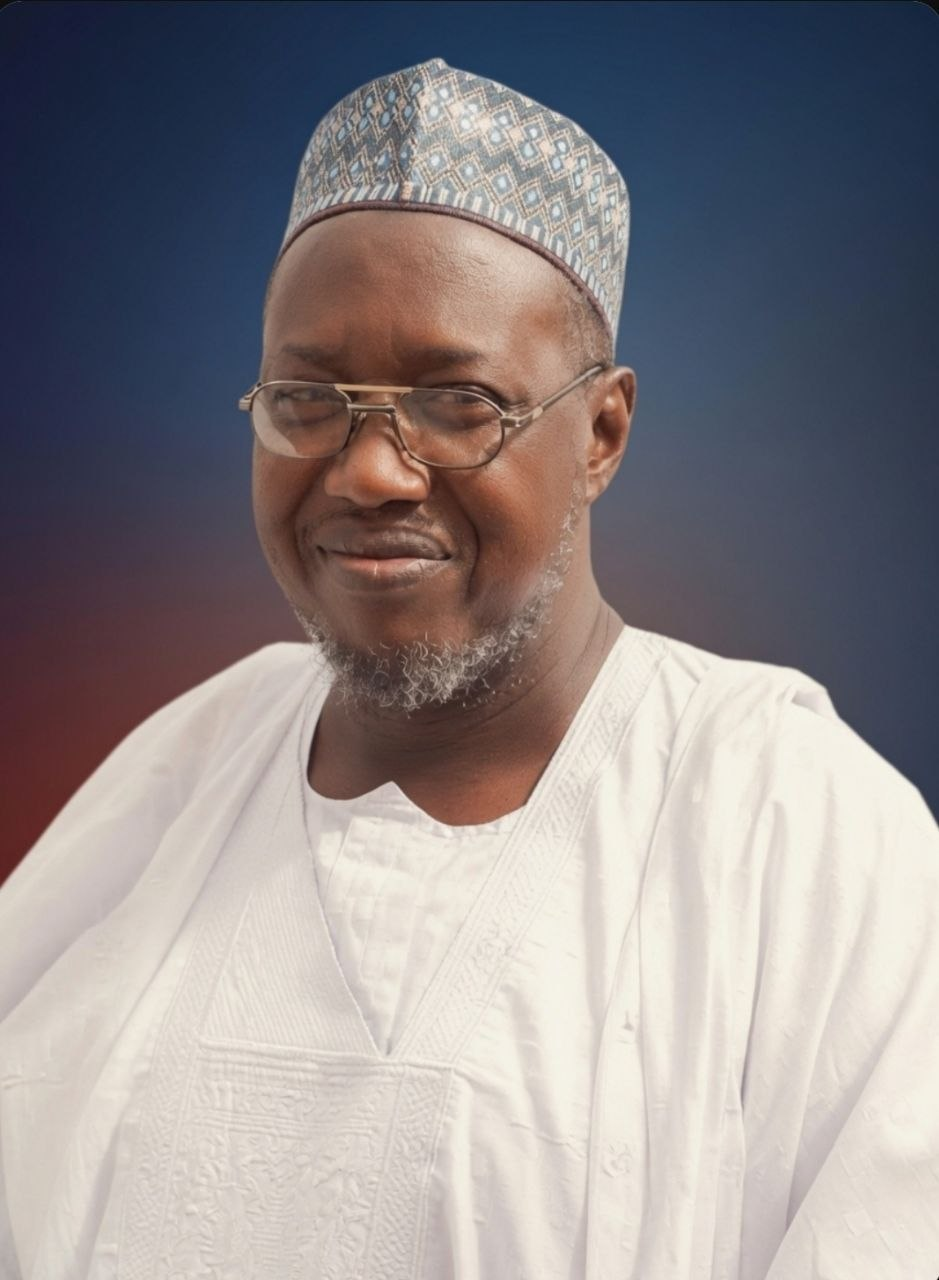
- Sheikh Ja'afar Mahmud Adam
- Title: Sheikh Ja'afar

Personal life
- Born: Ja'afar Mahmud Adam; February 12, 1960 Daura, Katsina State
- Died: April 13, 2007 (aged 47) Kano
- Cause of death: Assassination
- Main interest(s): Hadith, Tafsir and Tawhid
- Notable idea: Steadfastness to the traditions of prophet Muhammad (Sallallahu-'Alaihi-wa-Sallam)
- Notable work(s): Complete Translation of the Holy Qur'an, Teaching the true religion of Allah, and forewarning against whatsoever negates it (Bid'a and kufr, etc.)
- Education: Islamic University of Madinah

Religious life
- Religion: Islam
- Denomination: Salafi, and Sunni
- Jurisprudence: Maliki

Muslim leader
- Teacher: Sheikh Ahmad Bamba (Rahimahullah)
- Influenced by: Ibn Taymiyyah, Muhammad ibn Abd al-Wahhab and Abubakar Gumi

Ja'afar Mahmud Adam (also known as Sheikh Ja'afar; 12 February 1960 – 13 April 2007) was a Nigerian Salafi Islamic scholar and a member of the Jama’at Izalat al Bid’a Wa Iqamat as Sunna, a religio-political organisation with headquarters in Abuja. He lived mainly in Kano and travelled regularly to Maiduguri to deliver his annual Ramadan Tafsir.

== Early life and education ==
Ja'afar Mahmud Adam was born on 12 February 1960 in Daura, Katsina State. He later studied at the Islamic University of Madinah in Saudi Arabia. His teachers included Sheikh,Dr. Ahmad Bamba. His scholarly interests centred on Hadith, Tafsir and Tawhid, and he was influenced by the writings of Ibn Taymiyyah, Muhammad ibn Abd al-Wahhab and Sheikh Abubakar Gumi.

== Career and activities ==
Sheikh Jafar was a well-known preacher in northern Nigeria. He was associated with the Izala movement and delivered regular lessons and Qur’anic commentary (Tafsir). He lived primarily in Kano and was known for his annual Ramadan Tafsir sessions in Maiduguri. His teaching focused on returning to the Qur’an and Sunnah and warning against practices he considered innovations (bid’a).

== Death ==
Sheikh Ja'afar Mahmud was assassinated in his mosque during the Subh (dawn) prayer in Kano on 13 April 2007.

At the time, opinions differed about who was responsible. Some blamed Boko Haram, while others pointed to political motives linked to then-Kano governor Ibrahim Shekarau, whom Adam had criticised.

In a 2018 book, Abu Musab al-Barnawi (son of Boko Haram founder Mohammed Yusuf) stated that Adam was killed by the Kanana Taliban, also known as the Nigerian Taliban.

Later analysis by researchers, including work published by the Council on Foreign Relations, has pointed to internal factional violence within early Boko Haram-related groups as the most likely explanation.

== Notable works ==
Sheikh Ja'afar Mahmud Adam was a prolific scholar and preacher whose educational efforts primarily focused on scriptural exegesis (Tafsir) and the propagation of orthodox Islamic teachings as understood within Salafi methodology.

His major contributions include:

- Complete Translation and Tafsir of the Holy Qur'an: One of his most enduring legacies is his comprehensive audio recording of the Quranic *Tafsir*, delivered annually during Ramadan in Kano. These sessions were widely recorded, distributed across Northern Nigeria on cassette tapes and compact discs, and later broadcast on radio and television.
- Da'wah and Religious Instruction: Dedicated to teaching what he regarded as the true principles of Islam, his lectures frequently emphasized strict monotheism (Tawhid) and warned against practices he considered innovations (Bid'a) or forms of disbelief (Kufr). His instructional framework sought to reform local religious practices by grounding worship strictly in Quranic texts and prophetic traditions (Sunnah).

== See also ==
- Sheikh Abubakar Gumi
- Sheikh Muhammad Auwal Albani Zaria
- Sheikh, Dr. Ahmad Bamba
- Prof. Isa Ali Pantami
- Sheikh, Dr. Idris Abdul'aziz Dutsen Tanshi
- Sheikh, Dr. Ahmad Abubakar Gumi
- Sheikh Abdullahi Bala Lau
- Sheikh, Dr. Kabiru Gombe
- Sheikh Sani Yahaya Jingir
- Sheikh, Dr. Aminu Ibrahim Daurawa
- Izala Society
