= Kabiru Gombe =

Islamic Cleric

Sheikh Muhammad Kabir Haruna
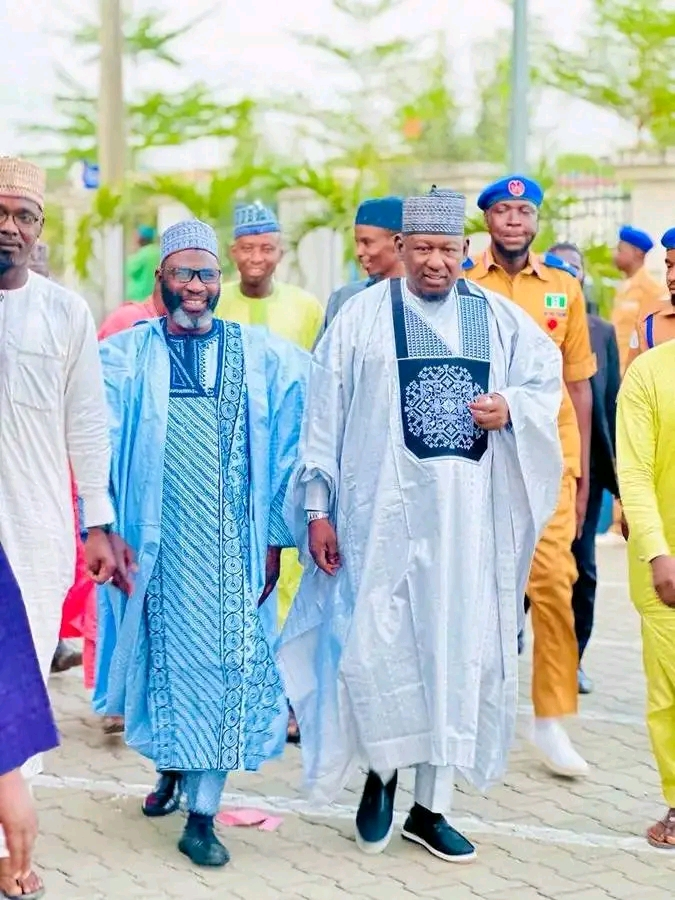

National Secretary, JIBWIS Nigeria
- Preceded by: Sheikh Bashir Makama Zaria

Personal life
- Born: Muhammad Kabir Haruna; 1 June 1969 (age 57) Yamaltu/Deba, Gombe State
- Spouse: 4
- Children: 20
- Era: Modern era
- Region: Northeastern Nigeria
- Main interest(s): Qur'an, Fiqh and Tafsir
- Occupation: Islamic scholar

Religious life
- Religion: Islam
- Denomination: Sunni
- Jurisprudence: Maliki
- Movement: Malikiyya

Muslim leader
- Influenced by: Malik Ibn Anas and Abubakar Gumi

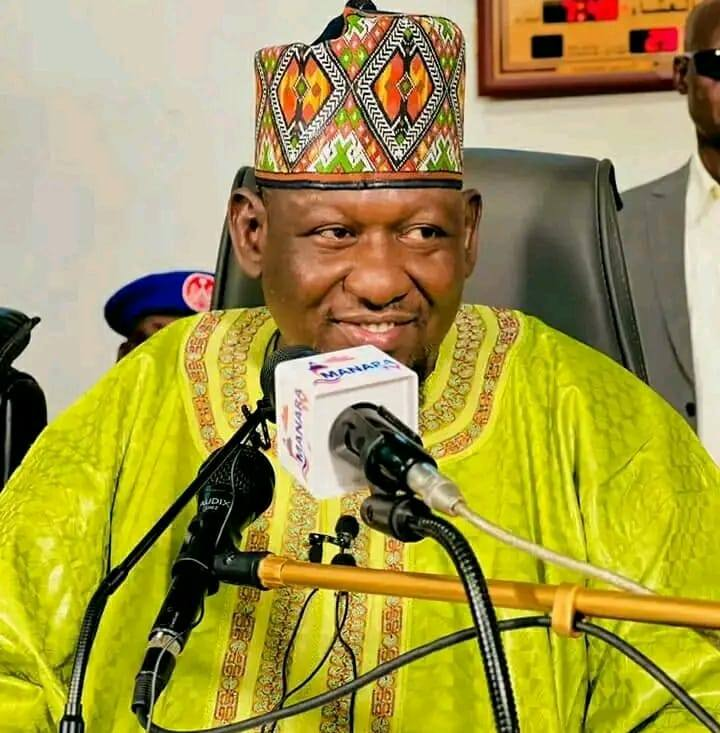
Kabiru Muhammad Haruna

Kabir Muhammad Haruna popularly known as Kabiru Gombe is a Nigerian Islamic scholar and preacher. He has been the present National Secretary General of the Jama'atu Izalatil Bid'ah wa Iqamatus Sunnah, the largest Salafiyyah movement in Nigeria since December 2011.

== Career ==
Muhammad Kabir Haruna started as a youth member of first aid group of JIBWIS who were called "Ƴan Agaji" in Hausa; he later went to Saudi Arabia to further his religious knowledge and study Qur'an science. Muhammad Kabir Haruna has been the present Secretary General of the Izala Society since December 2011. He performs annual Ramadan Tafsir and undergoes several Da'wah across Nigeria and other countries including Niger, Cameroun, Chad, Ghana, the United Kingdom etc. Muhammad Kabir Haruna also gives deep sermons about women's affairs. Currently, Muhammad Kabir Haruna is the national secretary of JIBWIS

== Islam ==
Muhammad Kabir Haruna is seen as one of the major critics of what Salafism considers as bid'a in Nigeria; he has taken a strong stance against Sufism (notably the Tijaniyya group) and Shi'ism.

== Politics ==
Muhammad Kabir Haruna and Ahmad Sulaiman Ibrahim supported Abdullahi Umar Ganduje over the candidate of the People's Democratic Party during the 2019 gubernatorial election in Kano State, saying that Ganduje had converted many pagans to Islam. When JIBWIS was accused of collecting money that was meant to support the fight against Boko Haram from the government of Goodluck Jonathan under the administration of Sambo Dasuki, Muhammad Kabir Gombe addressed the matter by saying the Izala Society did not collect any form of arms money from the government.

== See also ==
- JIBWIS
- Sani Yahaya Jingir
- Ahmad Abubakar Gumi
- Isa Ali Pantami
- Ja'afar Mahmud Adam
- Ahmad Sulaiman Ibrahim
- List of Imams in Nigeria
