= Kano State Hisbah Corps =

Religious police force in Kano state, Nigeria

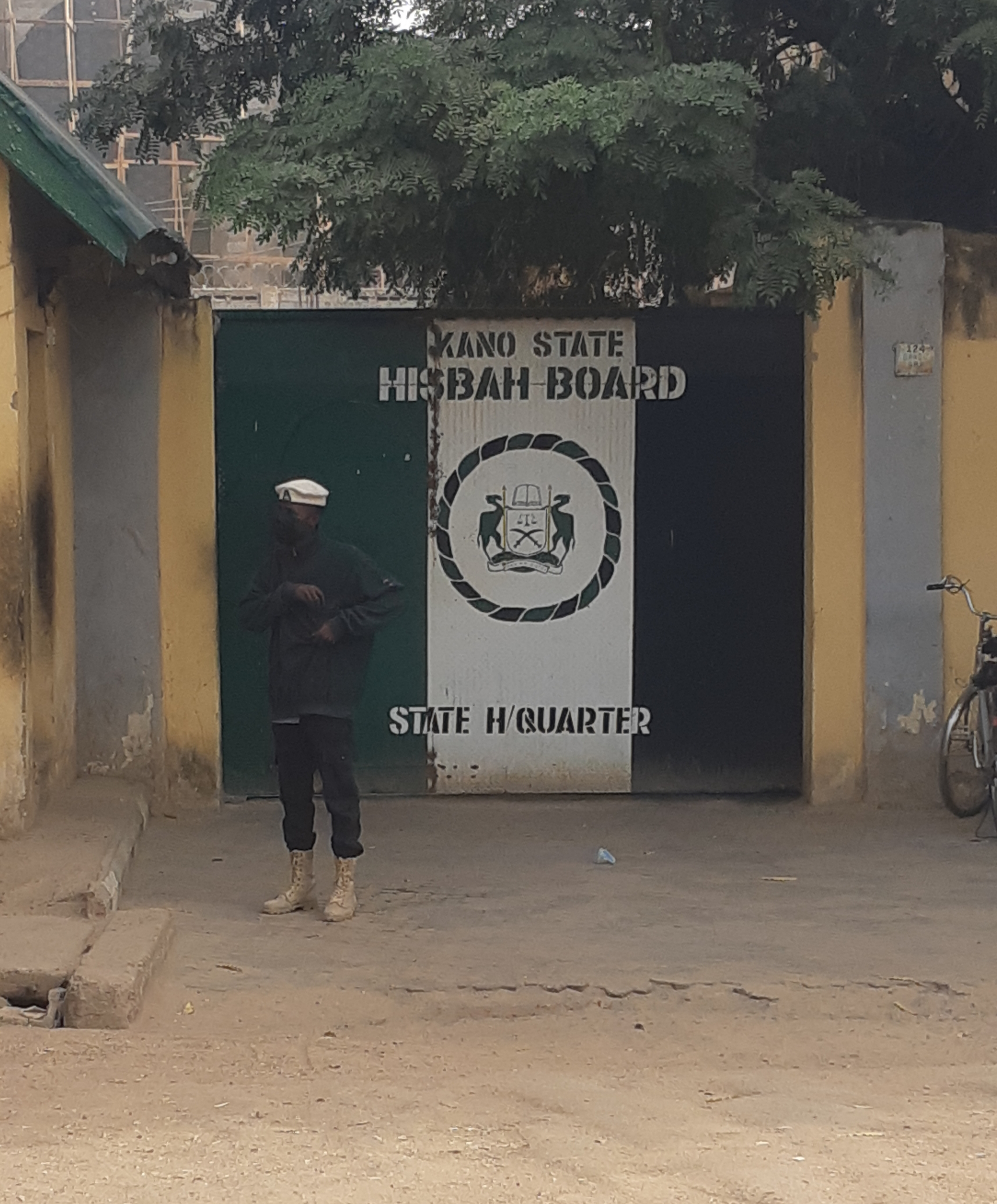
Kano State Hisba Board

The Kano State Hisbah Corps is a religious police force in Kano state, Nigeria responsible for the enforcement of Shari'a to only Muslims in Kano state and other parts of the northern Nigeria. Malam yahaya faruk chedi is the first commander General of Hisba, followed by Sheik Ibrahim Mu'azzam Maibushra and then Sheik Aminu Ibrahim Daurawa. Sheikh Daurawa resigned as commander of Hisbah Kano in 2019, as of 2022, its commander is Haruna Ibn-Sina. Sheikh Daurawa was reappointed by Kano State governor Abba Kabir Yusuf in 2023 as its commander.

== History ==
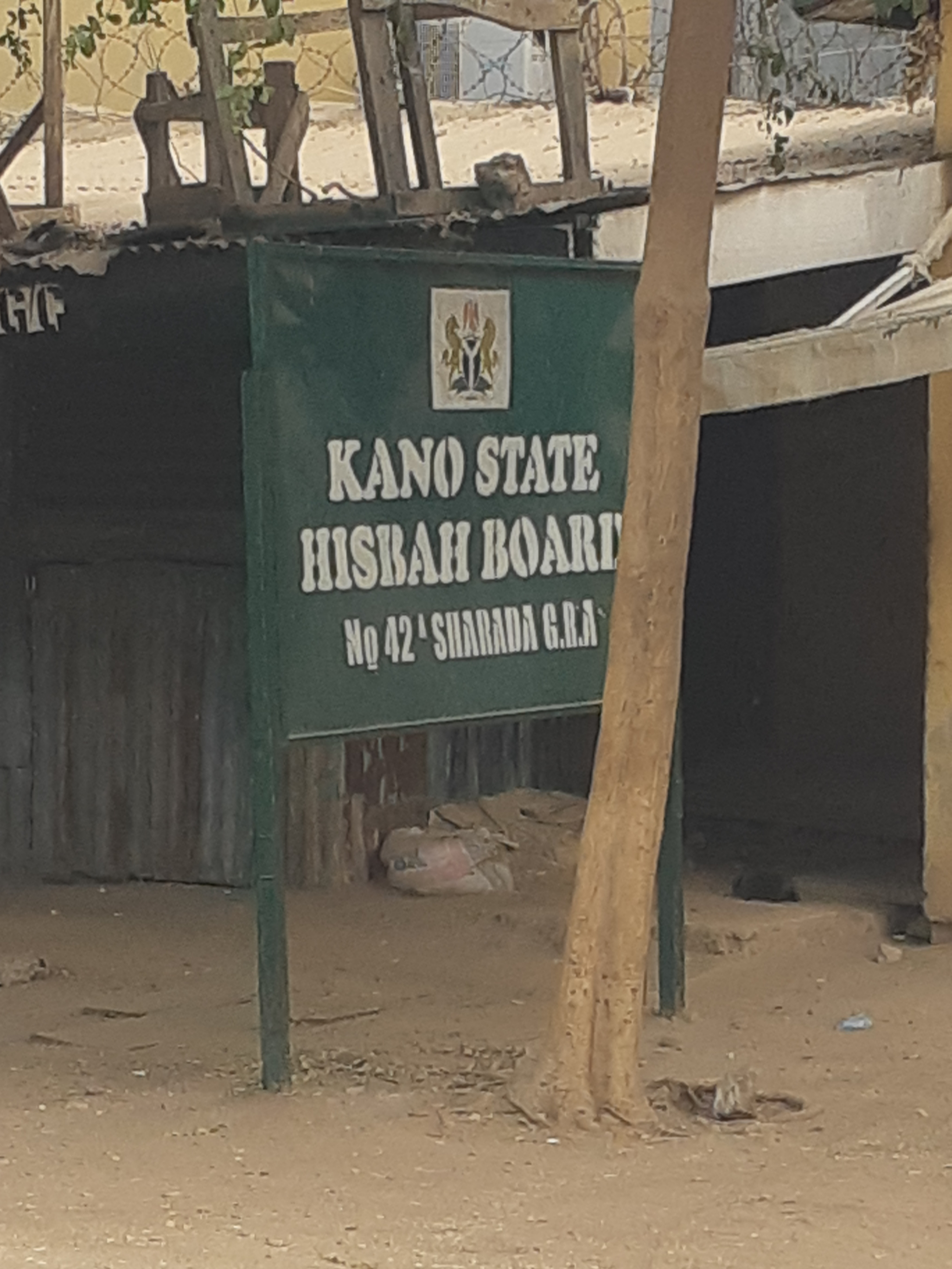
Kano Hisba signboard

The Kano State Hisbah Corps was established by the state government in 2000 and was improved in 2003 with the institutionalization of formerly local and privately maintained hisbah security units. Hisbah, which is an Arabic word meaning "accountability", is an Islamic religious concept that calls for "enjoining what is right and forbidding what is wrong on every Muslim." The Hisbah Corps, which operates under the jurisdiction of a Hisbah Board composed of government officials, secular police officers, and religious leaders, is highly decentralized with local units supervised by committees composed of officials and citizens in the communities in which they operate.

The relationship between the Hisbah Corps and civil police has been sometimes acrimonious. The Nigeria Police Force (NPF), to whom the Hisbah must report crimes, frequently refuse to cooperate in enforcement of religious law. On multiple occasions, NPF officers have arrested Hisbah members for trespassing when the latter have attempted to enter private property to enforce Sharia. And, in 2006, two senior Hisbah officers were detained by federal police and questioned on suspicion they were seeking foreign funding to train militants.

As of 2010 there were approximately 9,000 male and female officers of the Kano State Hisbah Corps.

The Kano State Hisbah court has extended its rule to some Northern States with high population of Muslims in Nigeria. Some regions in States like Kaduna and Kwara now have rules from the court that governs them. The court set up rules that bans women and girls from using Mobile phones and sunglasses amongst other things listed.

== Authority and jurisdiction ==
The Hisbah Corps does not have authority to execute arrests and officers are armed only with non-lethal weapons for self-defense, such as batons. Hisbah officers who observe violations of Sharia are expected to alert the Nigeria Police Force. Other duties of the Hisbah Corps include arbitrating the voluntary reconciliation of disputes, verbally chastising violators of Sharia, and maintaining order at religious celebrations. Hisbah are also trained to assist with disaster response operations.

An example of a Kano State Hisbah Board activity is the destruction of 1,975,000 bottles of beer worth over N200 million (almost US$500,000) in 2020 that had been confiscated within metropolitan Kano.

According to the BBC, hisbah in Nigeria is supposed to apply only to Muslims, "but in reality, non-Muslims come under pressure to adhere to the Hisbah's rulings". At least some trucks "carrying alcoholic beverages belonging to non-Muslims were destroyed and bars were raided by the hisbah after it accused owners of 'corrupt acts'."

An example of the Hisbah's verbally chastising violators of Sharia is Ibn-Sina's criticism of Zahrah Bayero, the fiancée of President Muhammadu Buhari's son, Yusuf, who exposed her shoulders in photos from her bridal shower, allegedly failing "to set a good example to other Muslims". Ibn-Sina has also declared activities forbidden where his orders were "largely ignored by radio stations and shopping malls and they faced no sanctions". Such as barring the use of "the term Black Friday to advertise sales, saying that Friday was a holy day in Islam".

== Criticism ==
=== Comparison with other vigilante groups ===
Some observers have compared hisbah activities in Nigeria to vigilante groups that have operated in other parts of the country, partly based on local tradition and partly as a response to failings of the police. However, as of 2004, Human Rights Watch was not aware of killings by hisba members, in contrast to other vigilante groups like the Bakassi Boys in the southeast and the Oodua Peoples Congress in the southwest of the country, who have committed numerous extrajudicial killings and other abuses. It is also compared to the newly formed Operation Amotekun in the South West of the country.

=== Human rights violations ===
In 2022, Observations and interviews with people arrested by the Hisbah showcased potential human rights violations by the agency with reports of forced HIV and pregnancy tests, brutal beatings of inmates, and prolonged underage imprisonments. Several victims noted that they were non-Muslims and/or did not belief in sharia law with the state government countering that all people residing in Kano State fall under the jurisdiction of Hisbah, regardless of religion. Public outcry also arose over the alleged selective enforcement of Hisbah guidelines as critics noted that the lower and middle classes were targeted significantly more than wealthy residents.
