= Izala Society =

Islamic organisation

Jama'atu Izalatil Bid'a Wa Iqamatus Sunnah
- Ƙungiyar Kawar da Bidi'a da Sake Aiwatar da Sunnah
- Abbreviation: JIBWIS
- Nickname: Ƴan Izala
- Predecessor: Sheikh Isma'ila Idris
- Merged into: Hadaddiyar Ƙungiyar JIBWIS Jos Nigeria
- Successor: Sani Yahaya Jingir
- Founder: Sheikh Isma'ila Idris
- Purpose: Opposing Bid'ah
- Headquarters: Jos, Abuja, Nigeria
- Location: Has 36 state headquarters including the Federal Capital Territory (Abuja)
- Region served: West Africa
- National Chairman: Sheikh Abdullahi Bala Lau
- Key people: Sheikh Kabir Gombe
- Affiliations: Salafism

Izala Society or Jama'atu Izalatil Bid'ah Wa Iqamatus Sunnah (Society for the Removal of Bid'ah and Re-establishment of the Sunnah), also known as JIBWIS or by its Hausa nickname, Ƴan Izala is a Salafi organization originally established in Northern Nigeria to fight what it sees as the Bid'ah and Shirk practiced by the Sufi orders. It is one of the largest Sunni societies in Nigeria, Chad, Ghana, Niger, and Cameroon.

== History and organisation ==
JIBWIS was established in February 1978 in Jos, Nigeria by Sheikh Isma'ila Idris (1937-2000) in reaction to the Sufi orders, specifically the Qadiriyya and Tijjaniyya who practice Sufism. In the early days of the society, JIBWIS was involved in violent conflict with Sufi societies, before in the 1990s, the movement split into two competing factions based in Jos and Kaduna.

Today JIBWIS is one of the largest Salafi societies not only in Northern Nigeria, but also in the South and even in the neighbouring countries (Chad, Niger, and Cameroon). It is very active in Dawah (propagation of the faith) and especially in education. The Izala has many institutions all over the country and is influential at the local, state, and federal levels.

The group has been called a Salafi organisation "that embraces a legalist and scripture centred upon understanding of Islam". David Commins has described it as the fruit of missionary work by the Saudi Arabian funded and led by the World Muslim League. "Essential texts" for members of the JIBWIS are "Muhammad ibn Abd al-Wahhab's treatise of God's unity and commentaries by his grandsons". Ibn Abd al-Wahhab was the founder of the Wahhabi mission, the official Islamic interpretation of Saudi Arabia. He saw Sufism as rife with Shirk. The Izala Society has been considered the most nonviolent and educated Islamist group, among there activities include public preaching, Qur'anic recitation competition, lectures, seminars, workshops and other public insights.

== Beliefs ==
According to Roman Loimeier, the fundamental tenets of the Yan Izala can be summarized as follows:

- There are no saints in Islam; all believers are equally holy.
- Believing in a special status for Muhammad and his family is un-Islamic; All Muslims are equal.
- The practice of intercession is un-Islamic; at the graves of the deceased, prayers may only be offered for the dead themselves.
- The pilgrimage to Mecca is more important than ziyarat (visiting the graves of saints).
- No one other than the Prophet can perform miracles.
- No one except God knows the unseen—not even Sufis.
- Jinn exist, but they cannot be seen.
- God cannot be seen in dreams, in trance states, or in a waking state.
- The recitation of praise songs for the Prophet is un-Islamic.
- Sufism is un-Islamic because the veneration of Sufi sheikhs can lead to shirk.
- Imams of Friday mosques should not ask believers to perform additional prayers after the regular prayer, as these constitute bid'ah.

The society opposes the rituals of the Qadiriyya and Tijjaniyya brotherhoods. They reject the Salat al-Fatih, which is the primary prayer formula of the Tijjaniyya. In the early days, they declared anyone who recited this formula a kafir, arguing that it originated not with Muhammad, but with Abu al-Hasan Bakri, making it constitute as bid'ah.

== Prominent members ==
- Sheikh Abubakar Gumi (1924-1992)
- Sheikh Isma'ila Idris
- Sheikh Sani Yahaya Jingir
- Sheikh Isah Ali Pantami
- Dr Ahmad Abubakar Gumi
- Sheikh Yakubu Musa Katsina
- Alaramma Ahmad Sulaiman
- Sheikh Aminu Ibrahim Daurawa
- Sheikh Bello Yabo
- Prof Sani Rijiyar Lemu
- Sheikh Kabiru Gombe
- Sheikh Abdullahi Bala Lau
- Sheikh Jalo Jalingo
- Dr Sulaiman Adam (chief Imam Sultan Bello Mosque)
- Dr Bashir Aliyu Umar

== See also ==
- Islamic extremism in Northern Nigeria
- Islamic fundamentalism
- Salafism
- Wahhabism
- Idrisiyya
- Qadiriyya
- Tijaniyya
