= Muhammad Bello Yabo =

Islamic Cleric

Sheikh Muhammad Bello Aliyu Yabo
- Title: Bello Yabo

Personal life
- Born: Muhammad Bello Aliyu Yabo; 1962 (age 63–64) Yabo, Sokoto State
- Region: Northern Nigeria
- Main interest: Sunnah
- Notable work: Preaching
- Occupation: Preacher, Islamic cleric, Teacher

Religious life
- Religion: Islam
- Denomination: Sunni
- Jurisprudence: Maliki
- Movement: Malikiyya

Muhammad Bello Aliyu Yabo popularly known as Bello Yabo. (born 1 January 1962), is a Nigerian Islamic scholar and cleric from Yabo local government in Sokoto state, Nigeria. Sheikh Yabo criticises Muhammad Buhari administration for insecurity in Northern Nigeria, (Northwest) particularly in Zamfara, Sokoto, Kaduna, Katsina and Niger States.

== Education and Work ==
Bello Yabo attended Islamic school in his early age. After he graduated, Yabo started his primary school at Yabo primary school and later on proceeded to Government Day Secondary School. Bello Yabo was appointed as Special Adviser on Rural road maintenance, he served as internal auditor in Dange-Shuni local government, Director Finance Special Hospital Sokoto, Director Finance, SUDA and Ministry of Education Sokoto.

== Criticizing El-Rufae ==
In 2020 during the COVID-19 pandemic, Bello Yabo, Sokoto State Islamic cleric was nabbed after his video calling other Muslim followers to confront authorities for banning Eid-el fitr Prayer after fasting the month of Ramadan over COVID-19. He made a video which has gone viral condemning ban on Eid prayers, precisely in Kaduna State. He also criticised El-Rufae and other governors for the banning of the Eid-el fitr prayer in their states. He was arrested by Nigeria Police forces for calling El-Rufae as "a small bird".

== See also ==
- Izala Society
