= Sani Yahaya Jingir =

Islamic cleric

Sheikh Sani Yahaya Jingir
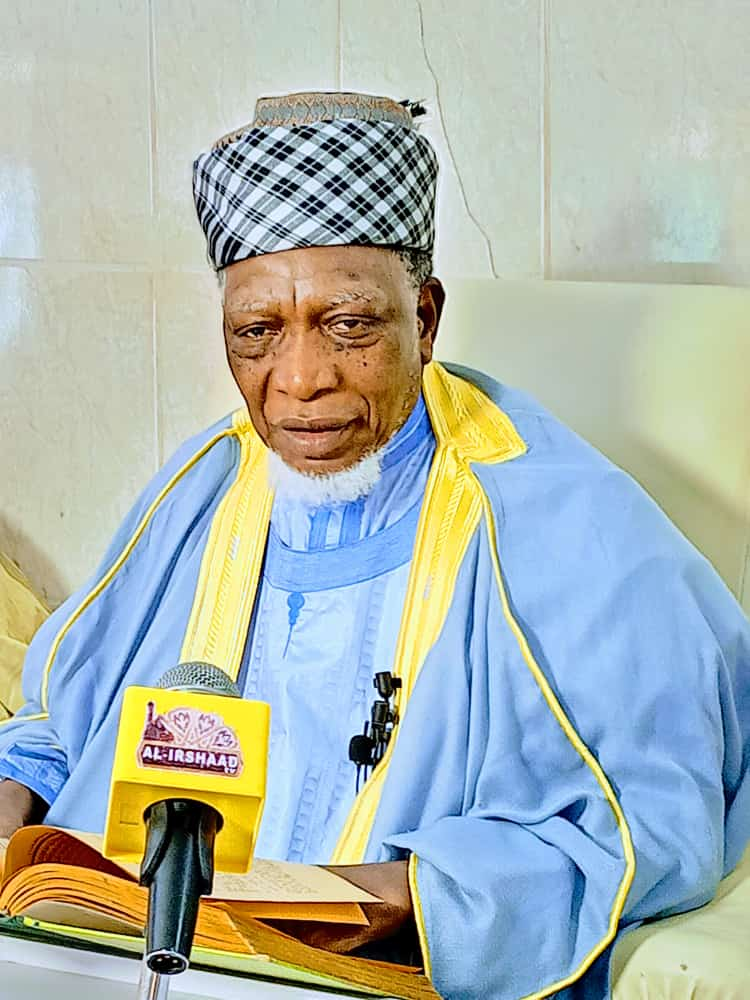

National Chairman Ulama’u council of JIBWIS

Personal life
- Born: Jos, Plateau State, Nigeria
- Era: Modern era
- Region: Northern Nigeria
- Main interest(s): Fiqh, Tafsir
- Notable idea: Boko Halal
- Notable work(s): Jangen, Nduren, Ndumen
- Occupation: Mufassir Consultant, Islamic cleric, Teacher, and Mufassir

Religious life
- Religion: Islam
- Denomination: Sunni
- Jurisprudence: Maliki
- Movement: Malikiyya

Muslim leader
- Teacher: Sheikh Abubakar Mahmoud Gumi, Sheikh Isma'ila Idris
- Predecessor: Sheikh Isma'ila Idris
- Influenced by: Malik Ibn Anas
- Influenced: Sunnah

Sani Yahaya Jingir is an Islamic cleric scholar living in Plateau State, he is the National Chairman Council of Ulama Jama’atu Izalatul Bid’ah Wa’Ikamatis Sunnah JIBWIS National Headquarters Jos. On May 25, 2015 he was elected chairman of the council when a decision is made after a council meeting in Jos made by the Ulama’u's elders Council while Sheikh Alhassan Saed Adam to be the second chairman. The election was made when the council lost its chairman Sheikh Zakariyya Balarabe Dawud.

== Islamic notable work ==
Jingir performs annual Ramadan tafseer in Jos, He is one of the most prominent scholars in Northern Nigeria. Jingir preaches teachings on the importance and benefits of imparting education among children of both genders. Jingir also made a firmly fatwa that anyone who associates Ibrahim Inyass with Allah in worship is a Kafir. Jingir shows the importance of optional Sittu shawwal fasting after Ramadan mandatory fasting, Jingir called the government of Nigeria to work with Saudi Arabiya on what happened in Saudi Arabia during Hajj on 24 September 2015 as 2015 Mina disaster, to take foresight measures to prevent similar future crowd accident on building collapse. Jingir makes hard preach on Boko haram by disbelieving that their act of Jihad is not according to the Islamic Shari'ah. Jingir during an opening ceremony of Juma’at Mosque on top of the Zinariya Hill in North of Jos. He warned kidnappers across the country to seek a forgiveness from Allah, and repent likewise he will organize special prayers and fasting until Allah destroys them, some people failed an attempt of his murder after being paid 500 thousand Naira.

== Criticism ==
Jingir was invited by the state government of Plateau State after performing a Friday congregational prayer on 27, March 2020, when a curfew and a lockdown is declared on Christians and Muslims of Nigeria not to have a congregational prayers to avoid the spread of the virus, Jingir said; Coronavirus was implemented to stop Muslim from Salah, also on Friday at his residence in Jos, Jingir said “Coronavirus is a hoax, a propaganda meant to fight Islam and to also execute economic war between China and America”. He also called the attention of federal and state government not to ban congregational prayers in Mosques, Jingir also said “I am calling the Saudi Arabian authority to open the grand Mosques in Makkah and Madinah so that Muslims can observe prayers.”Jingir also state further reasons and his view about the pandemic. Afterwards, Jingir made an announcement that he will follow all the laws and implementations provided by the government of Nigeria to tackle the virus because he fully understands that the Virus is real not as he was thinking before.

== See also ==
- JIBWIS
- Kabiru Gombe
- Ja'afar Mahmud Adam
- Dahiru Usman Bauchi
