= Sulaiman Muhammad Adam =

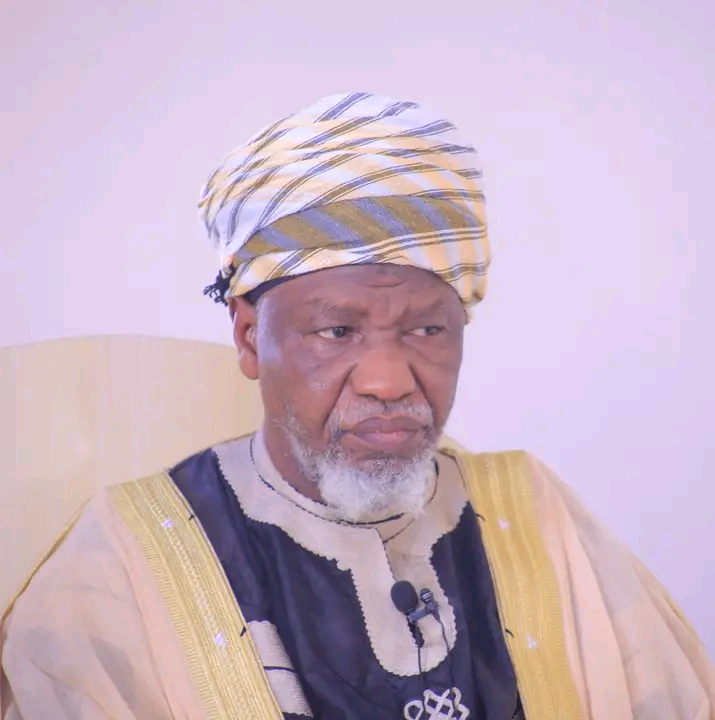
- Title: Imam

Personal life
- Born: Sulaiman Muhammad Adam; 14 June 1962 (age 64) Nigeria
- Era: Modern era
- Region: Northern Nigeria
- Main interest: Sunnah
- Occupation: Islamic cleric and Imam

Religious life
- Religion: Islam
- Denomination: Sunni
- Jurisprudence: Maliki
- Movement: Malikiyya

Sulaiman Muhammad Adam (born 14 June 1962) is the Chief Imam of Sultan Bello Mosque in Kaduna State, (also known as Sultan Bello Central Mosque), Sulaiman began leading the Juma'at prayer on 6 January 2017.

== Education ==
Sulaiman attended primary school in Umoko village, located in the southern region of Nigeria, Rivers State. After completing his primary education, he enrolled in secondary school where he pursued Higher Islamic Studies (HIS) in Jos. At the same time, he joined Arabic Teachers College for Grade 3. He then went on to study at the National College of Education in Kano. Additionally, he obtained a BSc in Arabic, Shari'a, and Islamic Studies from institutions in Madina and Malaysia. He is a PhD holder and a lecturer at Kaduna State University.

== See also ==
- Sultan Bello Mosque
- Izala Nigeria
