= Dahiru Usman Bauchi =

Nigerian religious leader (1927–2025)

Grand Leader of the Tijaniyya Movement in Nigeria Sheikh Dahiru Usman Bauchi
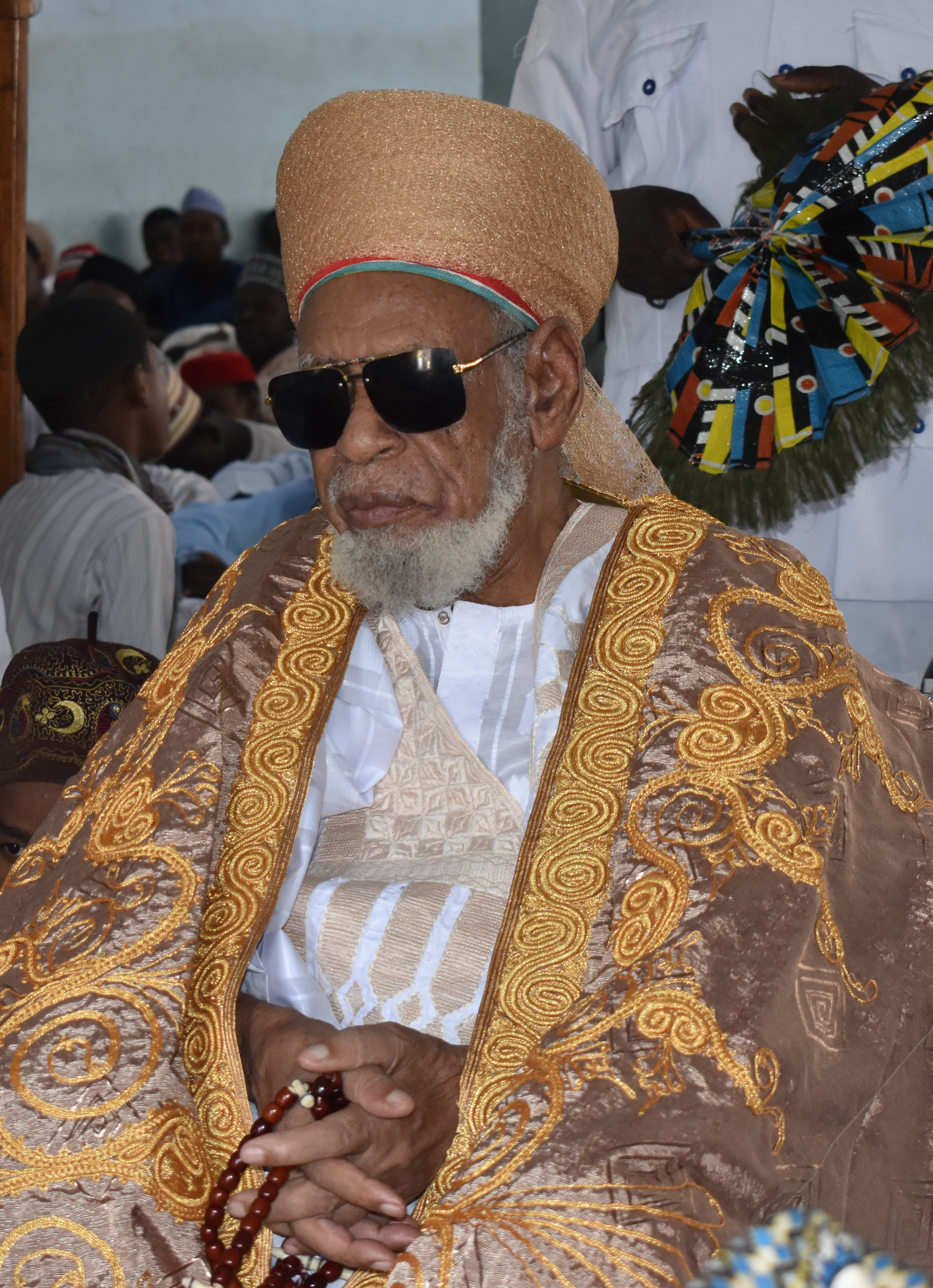
- Bauchi in 2021
- Title: Sheikh

Personal life
- Born: Dahiru Usman; 29 June 1927 Northern Region, Colony and Protectorate of Nigeria
- Died: 26 November 2025 (aged 98)
- Children: 95 (estimate) Ibrahim Dahiru Bauchi, Tijani Dahiru Bauchi, Bashir Dahiru Bauchi
- Era: Modern era
- Region: Northern Nigeria
- Main interest(s): Qur'an Teaching and Commentaries (Tafsir), Preaching.
- Notable work: Tafsir al Quran
- Occupation: Scholar

Religious life
- Religion: Islam
- Denomination: Sunni, Sufi
- Jurisprudence: Maliki
- Movement: Tijaniyya

Muslim leader
- Teacher: 15,000+
- Students: 10,000,000+

Sheikh Dahiru Usman OFR (29 June 1927 – 26 November 2025) was a Nigerian Islamic scholar. He was part of the Islamic Sufi group known as the Tijaniyyah and prominent in Nigeria.

== Early life ==
Sheikh Dahiru Bauchi was born in East Gombe at Northern Region, Nigeria. His parents were from Bauchi in East Gombe. His maternal roots are from Gombe. Dahiru Bauchi was born in the Hijri year 1346 (Gregorian calendar: 29 June 1927).

== Education ==
As a youth Dahiru Bauchi studied the Holy Qur’an under the tutelage of his father Alhaji Usman. Eventually he learned to recite the entire Qur’an from memory as could his father. He studied under scholars like Shaykh Tijani Usman Zangon-Bare-bari, Shaykh Abubakar Atiku and Shaykh Abdulqadir Zaria He received the Tijjaniyyah Tariqah. His father was a Tijani muqaddam (Imam), who was granted authorization (ijāzah) for tariqa. Dahiru Bauchi is deputy chair of the Fatwa Committee of the Supreme Council Of Islamic Affairs (NSCIA) in Nigeria.

Mosque of Shaykh Tahir Usman Bauchi

== Criticism ==
Bauchi was detained in 2009 in Saudi Arabia by Saudi security forces while performing his pilgrimage in Mecca. The cause of the arrest was the ongoing doctrinal dispute between three major Nigerian Islamic groups, Darika, Izala, and Shi'ah, that broke out during Ramadan of that year.

== Shi'a killings ==
Bauchi blamed the 2015 Zaria massacre on Nigerian authorities.

== Personal life and death ==
Bauchi had more than 80 children, and was married to the daughter of the renowned 20th-century Tijani scholar Sheikh Ibrahim Niasse. Sheikh Baba Laminu Niasse of Kaolack, Senegal, officiated the marriage in Ibrahim Niasse Mosque, Senegal.

Bauchi died peacefully in his home after a prolonged illness in the early hours of 26 November 2025, at the age of 98.

== See also ==
- Ibrahim Niass
