= Yakubu Musa Katsina =

Islamic scholar (born 1950)

Sheikh Yakubu Musa Katsina

Personal life
- Born: 1 January 1950 (age 76) Gwaram, Jigawa State, Nigeria
- Era: Modern era
- Region: Northern Nigeria
- Main interest: Da'awah
- Occupation: Teacher; Farmer

Religious life
- Religion: Islam
- Creed: Sunni
- Movement: Izala

Muslim leader
- Influenced by: Sheikh Abubakar Mahmud Gumi (teacher)

Yakubu Musa Katsina (born 1 January 1950) also known as Yakubu Musa Hassan is a Nigerian Islamic scholar and a member of the founding leaders of one of the largest Islamic organizations in West Africa JIBWIS, where he still serves as the Chairman Board of Trustees.

== Early life and education ==
Sheikh Yakubu Musa Katsina was born in Gwaram local government of Jigawa State and bred in Kano, Jos, Plateau and Katsina State. He started his early Islamic education under his father. At the age of seven, he was carried by his sister's husband who was also a relative to Kano for the usual Qur'anic education. He stayed in the house of his sister where he learnt the Quran and memorized it. He equally studied some classical Islamic books in Kano. At the time he reached seven years, he already started learning some crafts activities in order to be self-reliant. He already knew the art of pottery from his father as well as metal box making. While in Kano, he learnt fishing and was recognized as a skilled fisherman by his mates.

Later on, he came back to Gwaram. But he stayed not much until he traveled to Jos to further his education with his paternal uncle, Sheik Ibrahim Mushaddadu, a renowned Tijjaniyya Muqaddam. At that period, Sheikh Ibrahim Niass visited Jos, where the young Yakubu Musa established acquaintance with him. In Jos, Yakubu Musa enrolled into Modern Islamiyya school established by The JNI for the training of graduate students of makarantun allo. In that school, Yakubu Musa excelled and was promoted to the secondary school section of the JNI school. He was equally trained as a murshid of the JNI. The same training had influenced his future career as an Islamic propagator.

== Journey from Tijjaniyya to Izala ==
When Islam got a momentous expansion at Kafanchan, now in Kaduna State, the people of the town requested for teachers and preachers. Yakubu Musa was sent along three others. By then they were all following the Tijjaniyya Sufi order in Kafanchan, the developed schools for both children and adults.

At that moment, the dawah of Sheikh Abubakar Gumi was gaining ground and was aired by the Radio Nigeria Kaduna. His constant criticisms of Sufism were appealing to Yakubu Musa. He then began to make analysis of what were obtained in the Quran and Sunnah of the prophets with what Sheikh Gumi pointed out as negation to Sufism. Hence, Yakubu Musa changed from adhering to Sufism. He then established allegiance with Sheikh Gumi and became a very close student of his. He attended the Arabic Teachers College in Katsina and also went to Hassan Usman Katsina Polytechnic, Department Of Legal Studies before later becoming an Islamic cleric in Nigeria.

== Teaching ==
He founded the Riyadhul Qur’an Islamic School and Sautussunnah Comprehensive Secondary School both in Katsina State.

Being an indegene of Katsina State, a predominantly Muslim city in northern Nigeria, Sheikh Katsina has been seen outspoken in several occasions against corruption and other injustices in the country.

== Honour ==
In July 2020, Yakubu was listed in "The 500 Muslims" magazine as one of the 500 most influential Muslims in the world, by the 2020 edition.
