= Independent (Nigeria) =

Nigerian daily newspaper

- Type: Daily newspaper
- Publisher: Independent Newspapers Limited
- Editor-in-chief: Steve Omanufeme
- Editor: Don Okere
- Managing editor: Steve Omanufeme
- Founded: October 2001; 24 years ago
- Headquarters: Lagos
- Website: www.independent.ng

The Independent is a daily newspaper published in Lagos, Nigeria. Independent Newspapers Limited was incorporated on 17 July 2001 and started operations in October 2001. The company publishes the flagship Independent newspaper and two editions on weekends: the Saturday Independent and Sunday Independent.

== History ==
The Independent is a successor to the Diet newspaper established in 1997 by James Ibori, a close friend of the military ruler General Sani Abacha. By 1999, most of the Diet staff had left since they had not been paid for some months. Ibori, who had been elected governor of Delta State in April 1999, relaunched the paper in a more colorful and attractive format, but without success. In 2001, the Daily Independent, largely owned by the same publisher, took the place of Diet.

In June 2006, Rotimi Durojaiye, an Independent reporter, was arrested and charged with sedition after writing a report questioning the cost and airworthiness of Olusegun Obasanjo's new presidential jet. The charges were dropped later.

In October 2009, the Nigerian Union of Journalists forced a closure of the newspaper. Reasons given were that the paper's management had refused to pay four months' salary arrears and had sacked 21 workers for no just reason. Owner James Ibori intervened, promising to pay the arrears and re-hire the workers, and the strike was called off. The former managing editor, Ted Iwere, left the paper because of these problems. In January 2010, James Akpadem, the new managing editor, said that Ibori was actively involved in efforts to restructure the paper, which was struggling with debt and unpaid salaries.

In March 2010, the Economic and Financial Crimes Commission (EFCC) asked that Ibori attend the Abuja headquarters of the Commission on 17 April 2010 "for interview". The Daily Independent published an editorial that indignantly defended Ibori. Ibori was arrested in May 2010 in Dubai, in the United Arab Emirates. He lost an appeal against a ruling that he should be extradited to Britain.

By April 2011, the EFCC had Ibori on its "most wanted" list, saying "The suspect is wanted in connection with a N9.2 billion case of Criminal Conspiracy, Theft and Misappriopriation of Public funds belonging to Delta State of Nigeria". On 16 April 2011, Ibori appeared in a British court to charged with a various money laundering and fraud offences.
