= Ahmad Sulaiman Ibrahim =

Islamic Cleric (born 1966)

Alaramma Ahmad Sulaiman Ibrahim
- Title: Alaramma

Personal life
- Born: Ahmad Suleiman Ibrahim; 1966 (age 59–60) Kakumi, Kankara, Katsina State, Nigeria
- Era: Modern era
- Region: Northern Nigeria
- Main interest: Sunnah
- Occupation: Islamic cleric and Qari

Religious life
- Religion: Islam
- Denomination: Sunni
- Jurisprudence: Maliki
- Movement: Malikiyya

Ahmad Sulaiman Ibrahim (born in 1966), popularly known as Alaramma Ahmad Sulaiman, is a Nigerian Reciter, Islamic scholar, cleric, and the famous Qur'anic reciter he also received many awards worldwide for his excellence in reciting The Holy Qur'an.

== Early life ==
Ahmad Sulaiman is a Nigerian Islamic scholar and Qari. His recitation of the holy Qur'an was notable in Nigeria and west Africa where many reciters adopts his style of recitation. He was born into the family Malam Suleiman Ibrahim in Kakuma Kankara local government of Katsina State, Nigeria. Suleiman's father died when he was only six years old. At the age of nine, Ahmad attended an Islamic school where he received both Islamic and Western education. He showed remarkable dedication to his studies and memorized the Qur'an at a very young age. During Ramadan Tafsir, Ahmad recites with Sheikh Kabir Haruna Gombe who is a well-known Islamic scholar in Nigeria who has taught and influenced many students in the country.

Sulaiman Ibrahim is an active member of the Jama'atu Izalatil Bid'ah wa Iqamatus Sunnah (JIBWIS), which is the largest Salafiyyah movement in Nigeria. The movement is focused on returning to the Islamic practices of the Prophet Muhammad and his companions, and rejecting any innovations that have been introduced into the religion.

== Abduction of Ahmad Sulaiman ==
In March 2019, Sheikh Ahmad Sulaiman was abducted by some kidnapers on his way from his home town to Kano after his visit to Kebbi state, Sheikh Ahmad Sulaiman has been reportedly kidnapped by unknown gunmen in Katsina State, multiple sources, have confirmed that Sheikh Sulaiman was abducted together with five others along Sheme to Ƙanƙara local government areas of Katsina State. Sheikh has been released after 15 days from his captivity.

=== Work Background ===
Ahmad Sulaiman Ibrahim was appointed as a commissioner II of education in Kano state, he was appointed by former governor Abdullahi Umar Ganduje of Kano State.

== See also ==
- Izala Society
