= Sultan Bello Mosque =

Mosque in Kaduna State, Nigeria

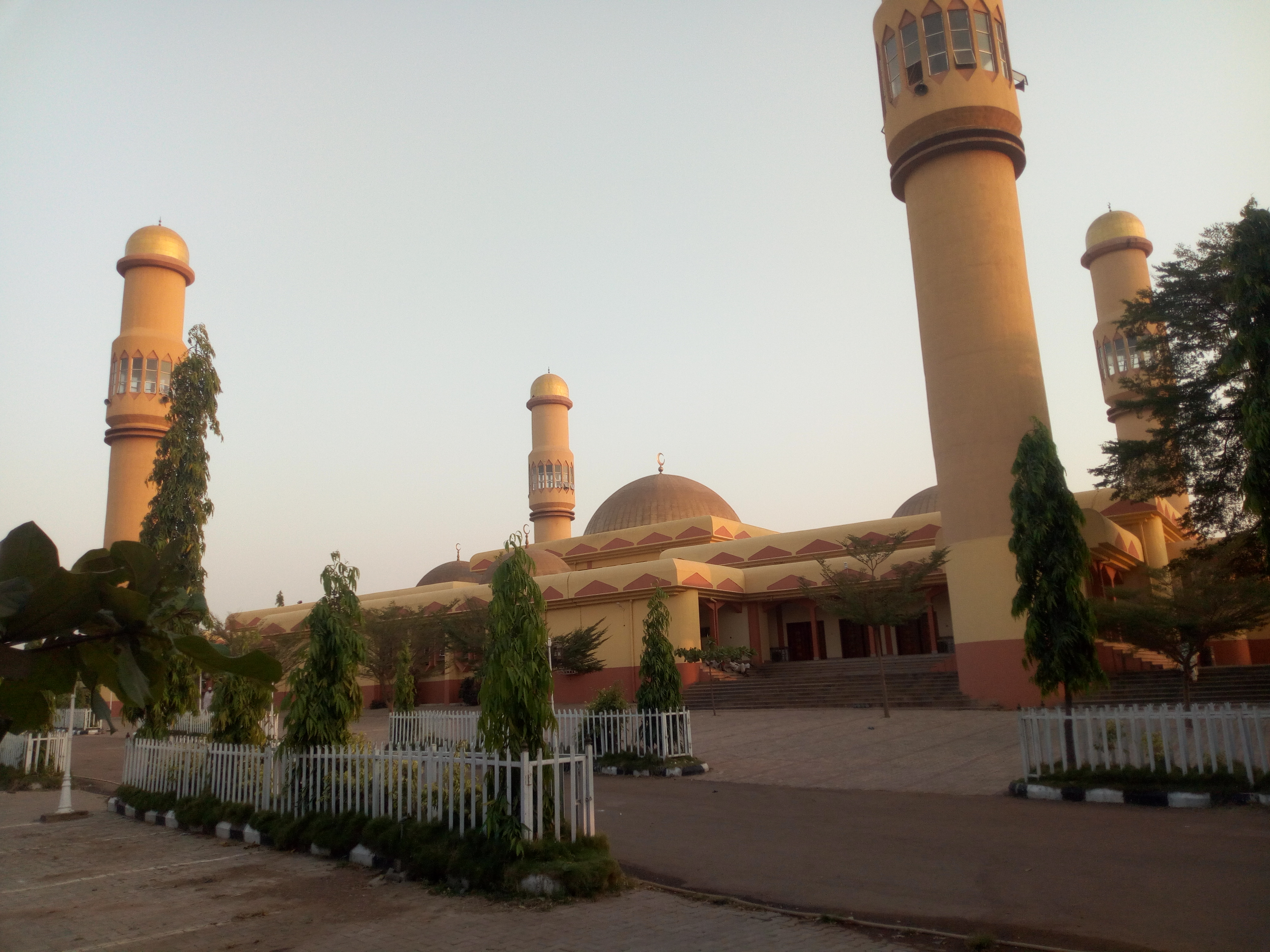

- Location within Nigeria

Religion
- Affiliation: Sunni Islam
- Ecclesiastical or organizational status: Mosque
- Leadership: Imams: Shaykh Dr Sulaiman Muhammad Adam; (Mufti) Shaykh Dr Ahmad Abubakar Gumi
- Status: Active

Location
- Location: Sultan Bello Road, Ungwan Sarki Muslimi 800282, Kaduna, Kaduna State
- Country: Nigeria
- Interactive map of Sultan Bello Mosque
- Coordinates: 10°33′03″N 7°26′45″E

Architecture
- Architect: Abdullahi Saidu Bello
- Type: Mosque
- Completed: 1962

Specifications
- Interior area: 2,300 m^{2} (25,000 sq ft)
- Dome: 5
- Minaret: 4

The Sultan Bello Mosque (Arabic: مسجد السلطان بلو) also known as the Kaduna Central Mosque, is one of the largest mosques in the city of Kaduna, in Kaduna State, Nigeria. Built in 1962, it is named after the then Sultan of Sokoto, Muhammadu Bello the son of Usman dan Fodio. The present Chief Imam of the mosque is Sulaiman Muhammad Adam, a former lecturer in the department of Arabic and Islamic Studies at Kaduna State University.

== Overview ==
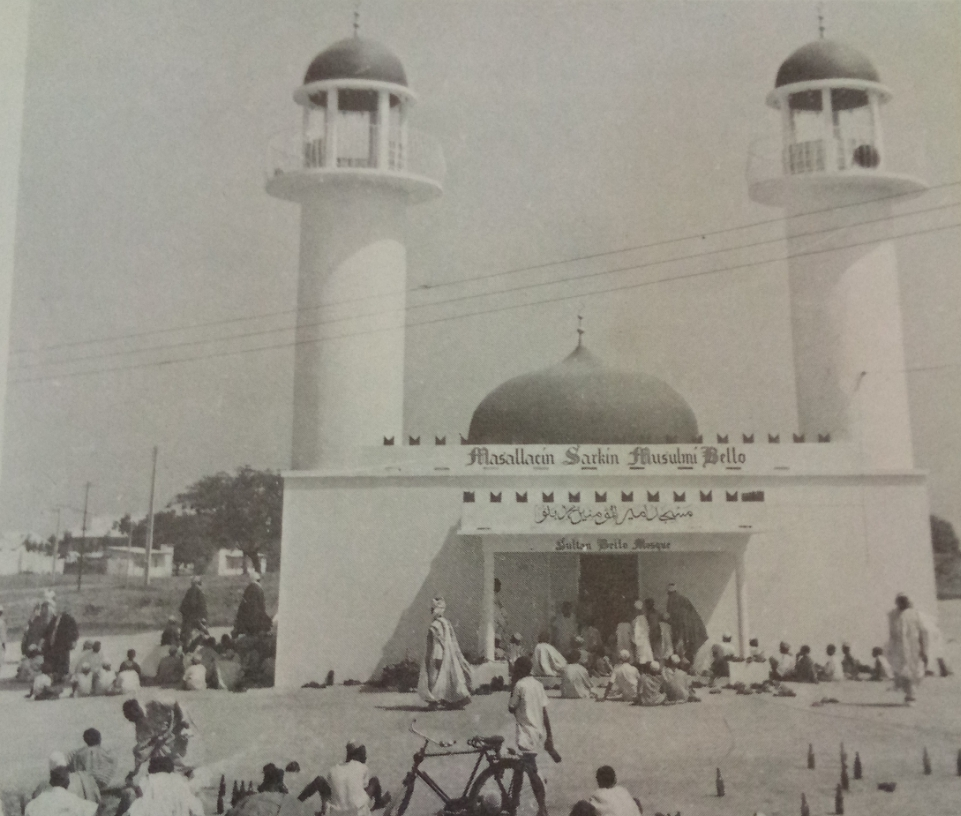
The mosque in late 1960

The mosque was named after Muhammad Bello, who was the then Sultan of Sokoto the son of Usman dan Fodio.

The Sultan Bello Mosque was expanded from its original existing prayer area of 220 square metres (2,400 sq ft) into a larger prayer area of 2,300 square metres (25,000 sq ft). The original structure was constructed in 1962, expanded in 1994, but the current structure is a massive building with five domes and four minarets.

The design was completed by architect, Abdullahi Saidu Bello.

== Gallery ==
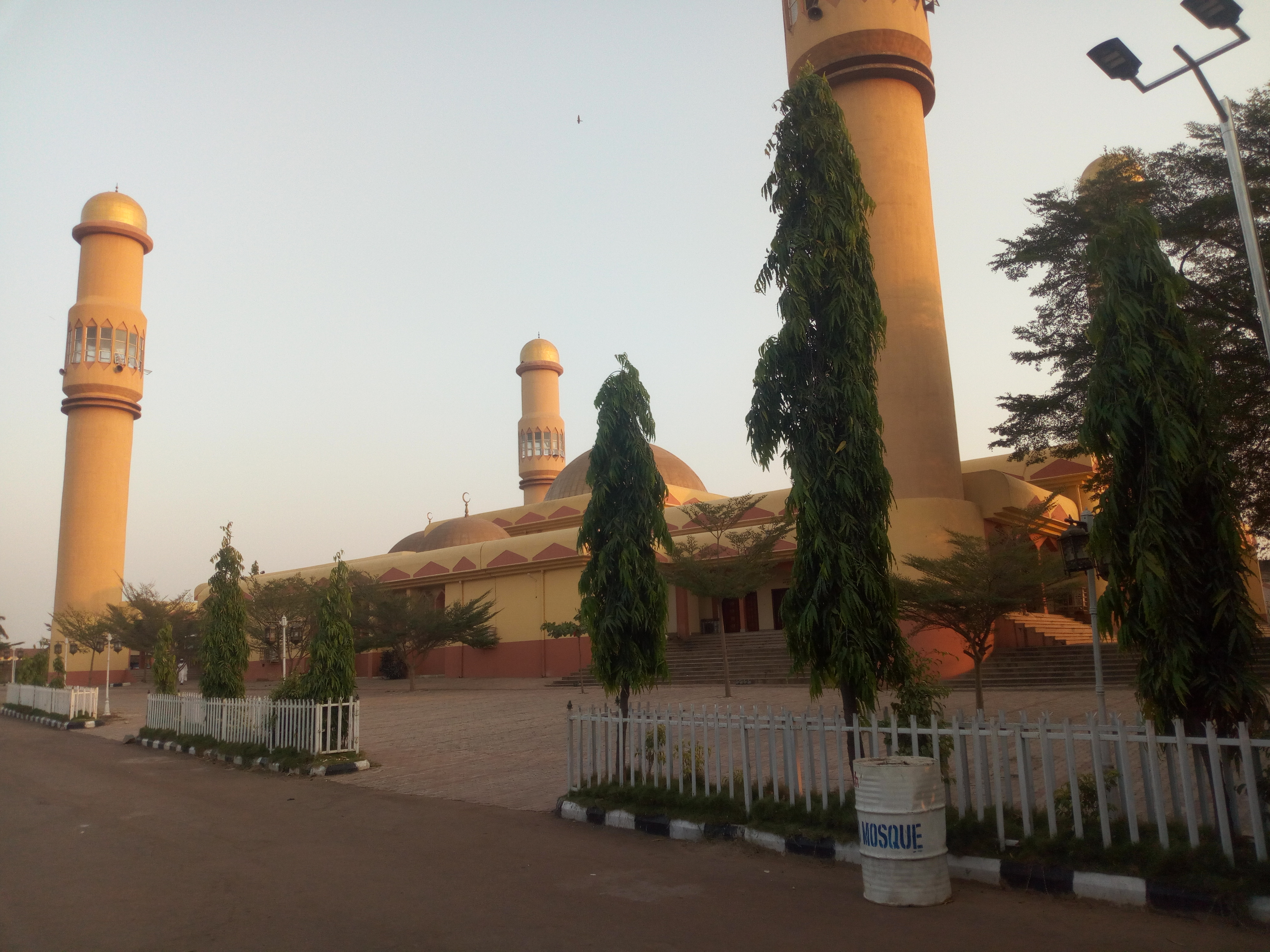
Aerial view

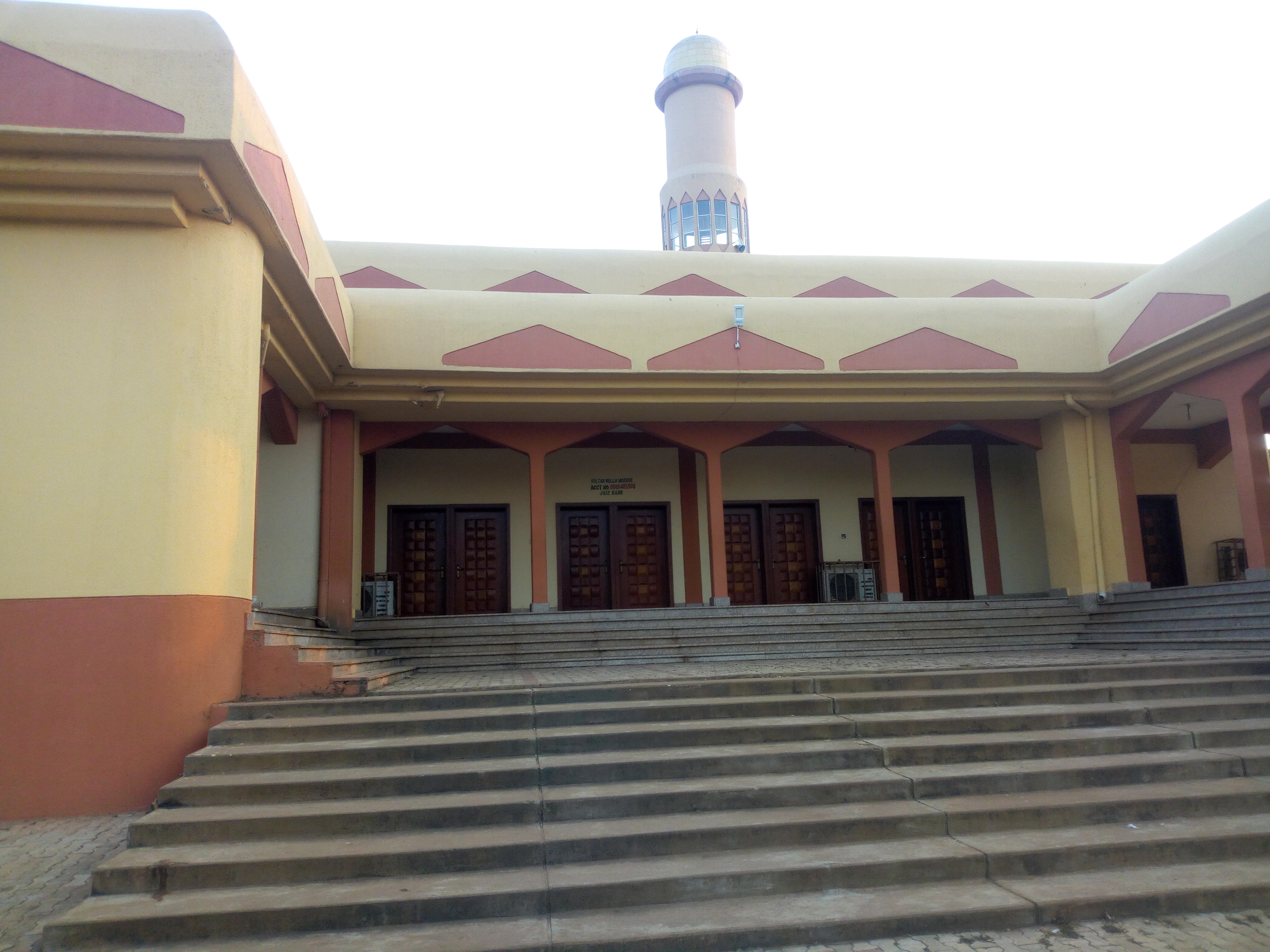
Main entrance with four doors

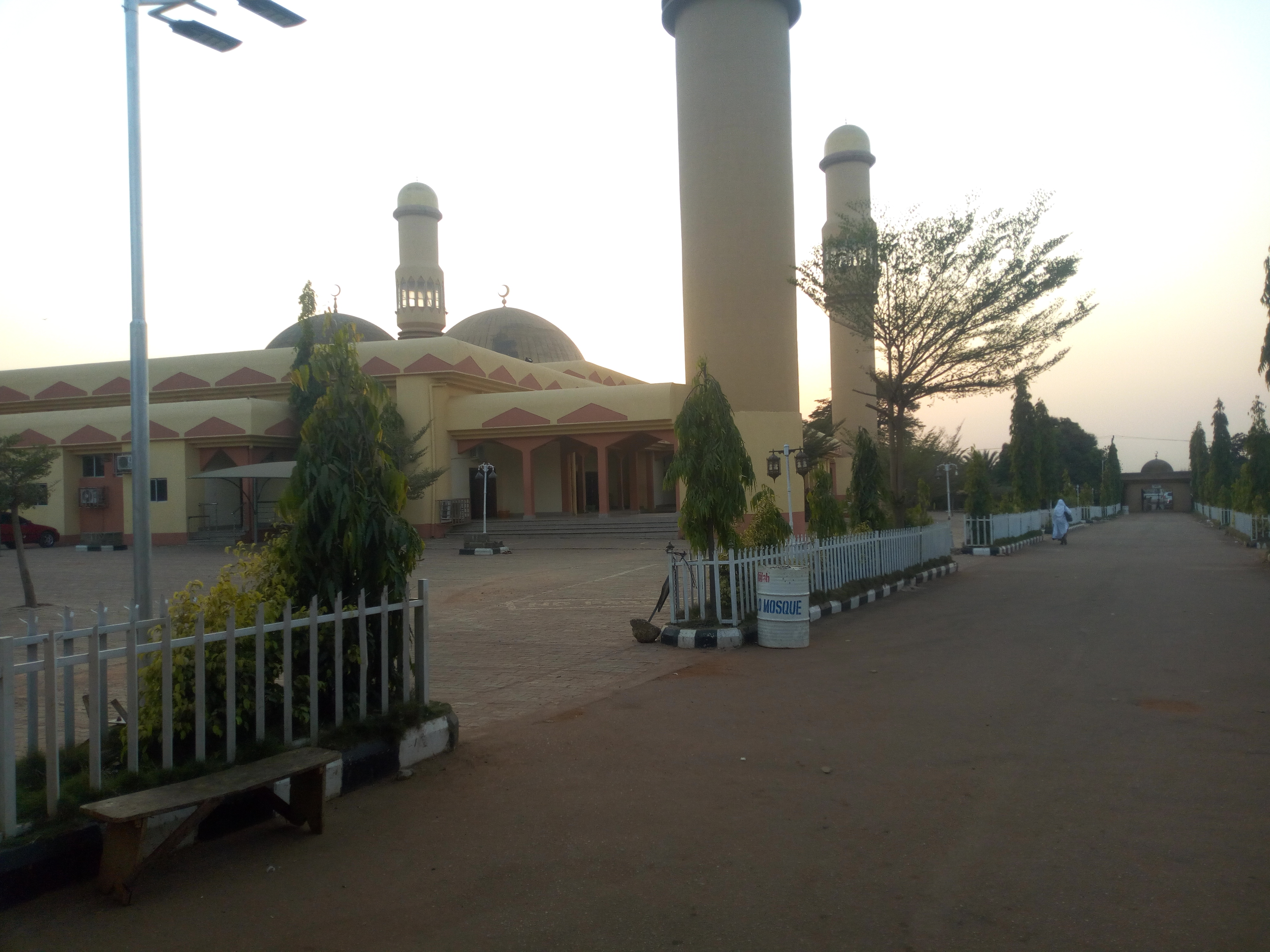
The passage

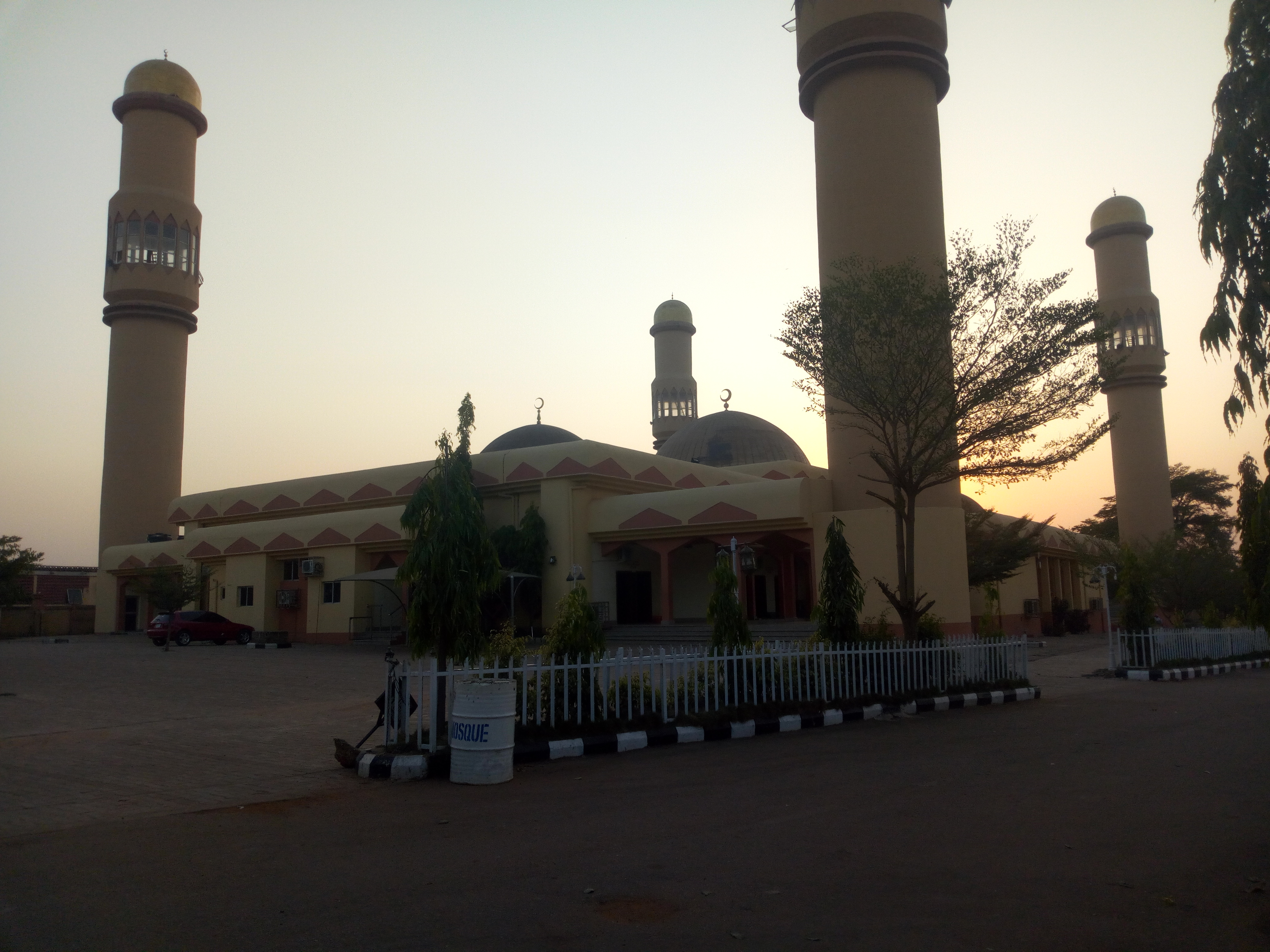
In the evening

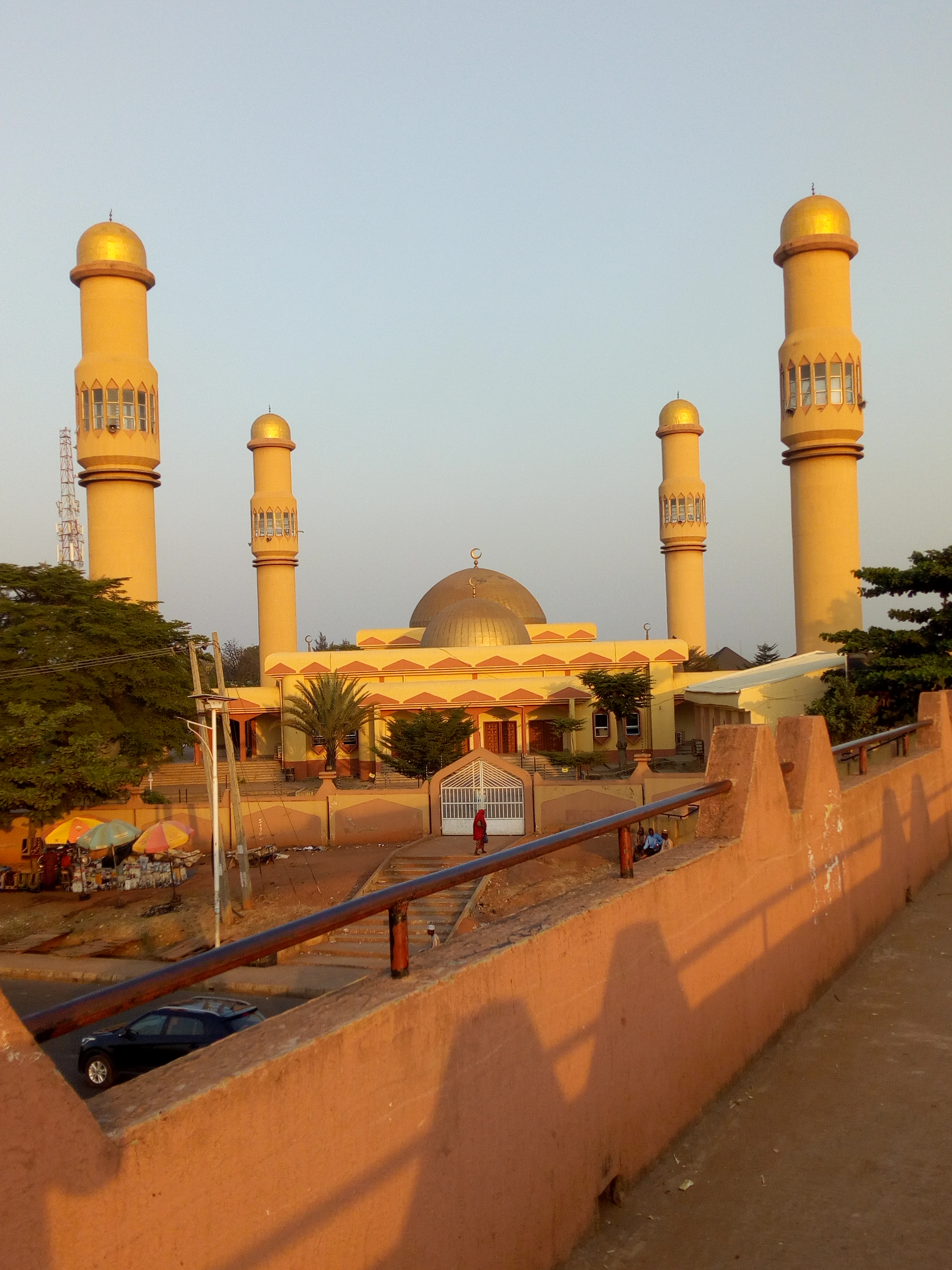
View of the mosque from a bridge

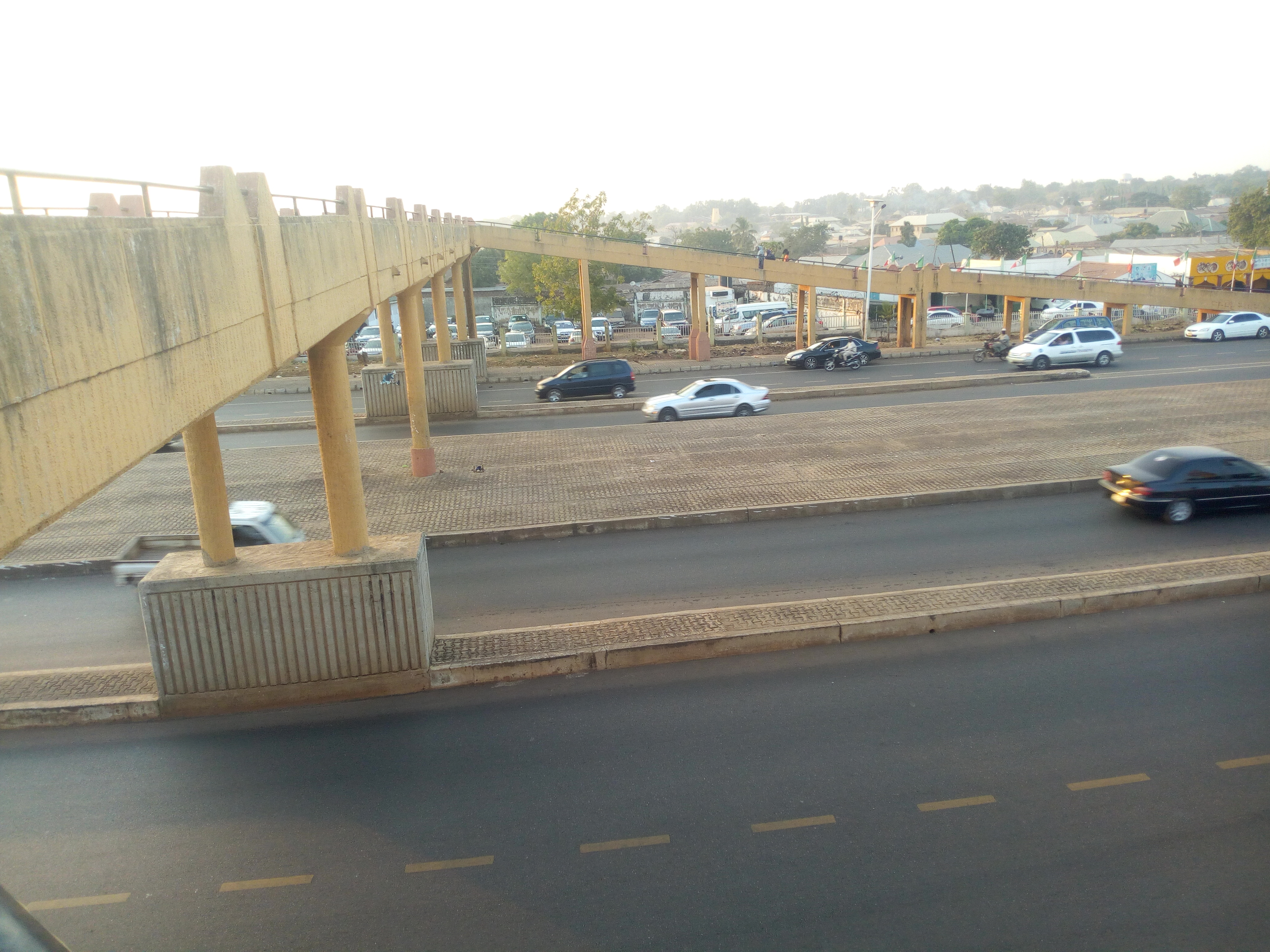
Abdulwahab Folawiyo bridge outside of the mosque

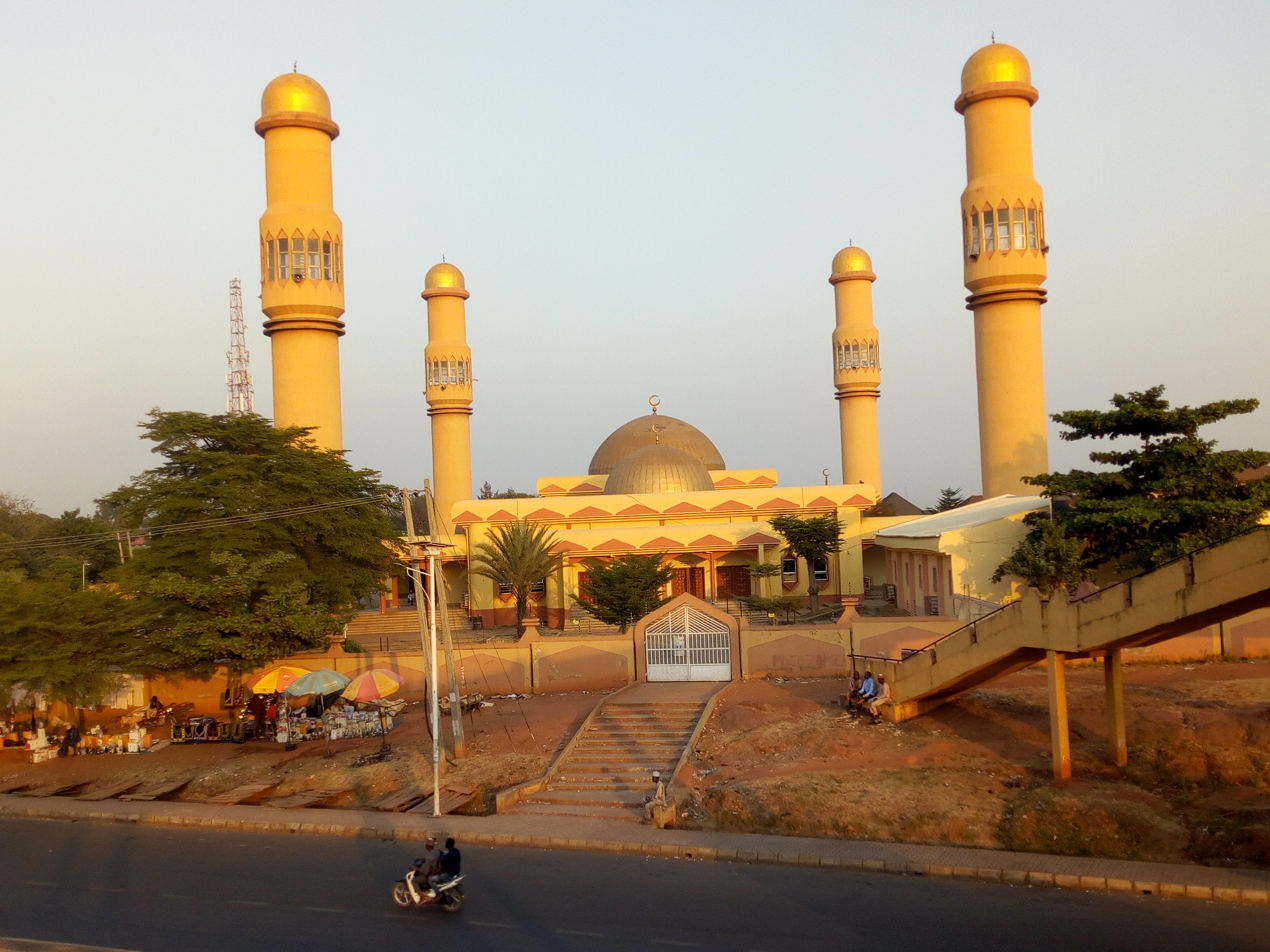
Entrance

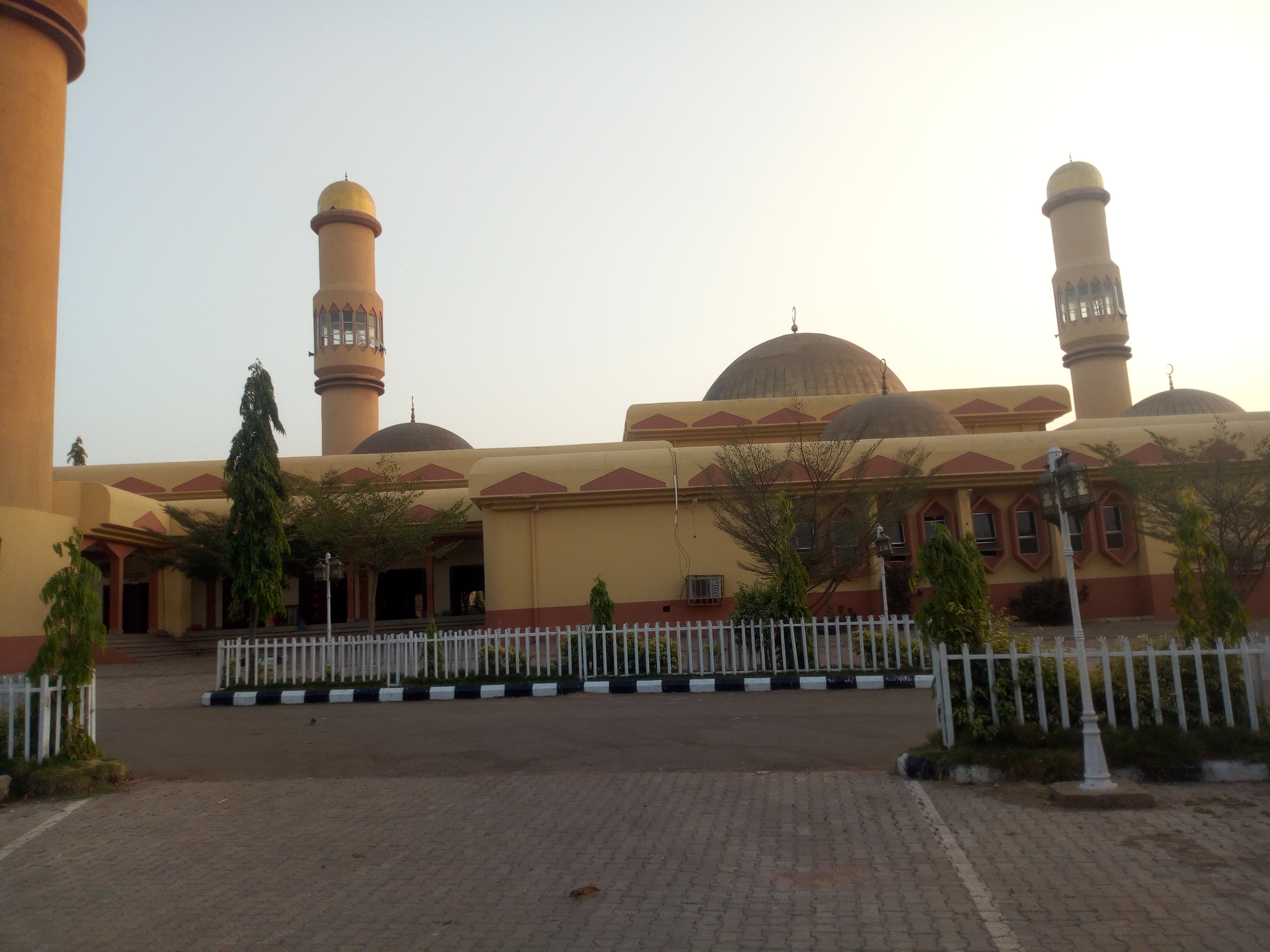
Elevation

== See also ==
- Islam in Nigeria
- List of mosques in Nigeria
