= Sani Umar Rijiyar Lemo =

Nigerian Islamic scholar and academic

- ثاني عمر ريجييار ليمو
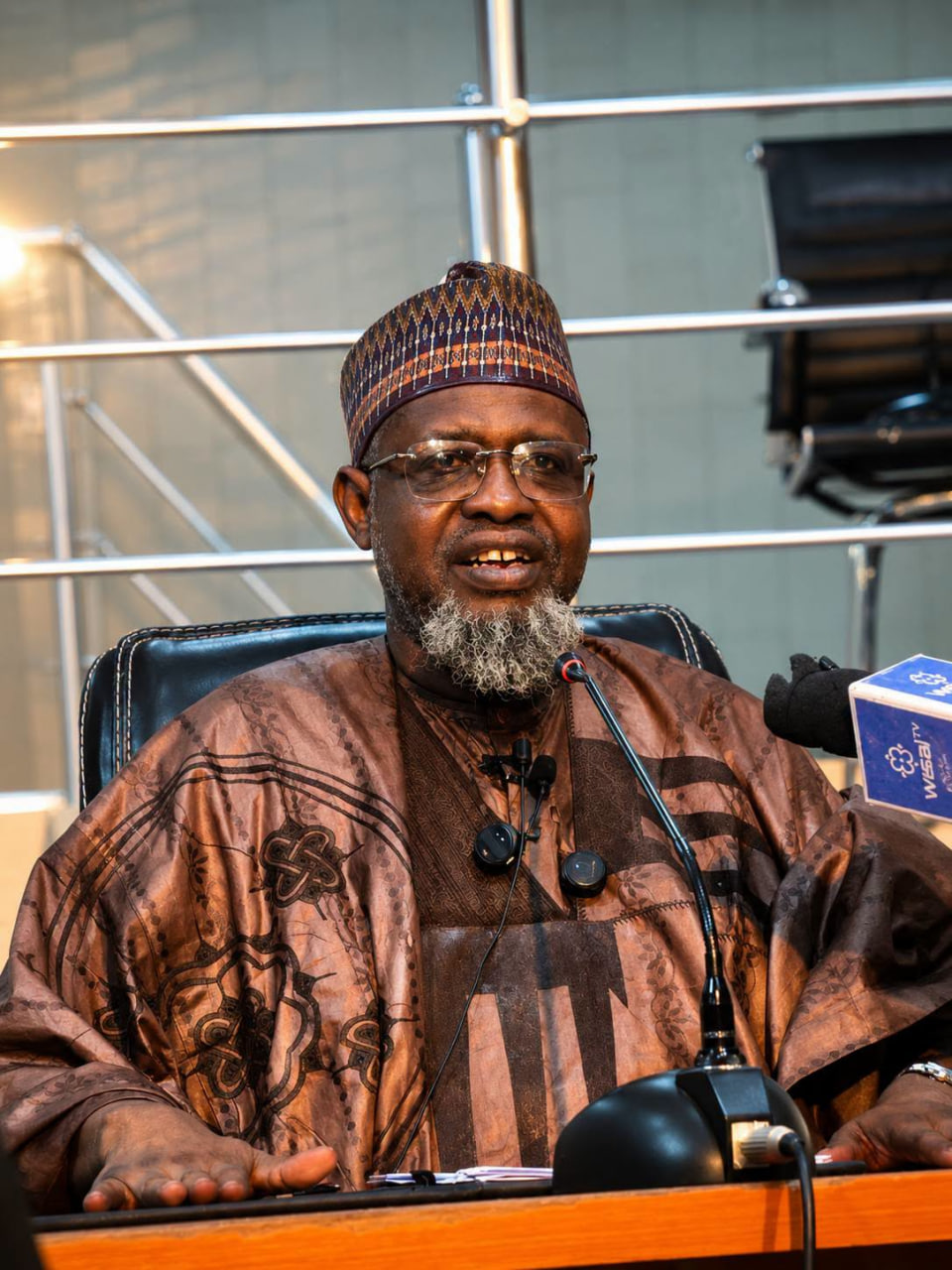
- Portrait of Professor Sani Umar Rijiyar Lemo
- Title: Sheikh, Professor

Personal life
- Born: Sani Umar Rijiyar Lemo; July 1, 1970 (age 56) Mecca, Saudi Arabia
- Citizenship: Nigerian, Saudi Arabian
- Main interest(s): Sunnah, Hadith and Tafsir
- Notable work: Da'awah
- Education: Islamic University of Madinah (B.A., M.A.)
- Occupation: Professor

Religious life
- Religion: Islam
- Denomination: Sunni
- Jurisprudence: Maliki

Muslim leader
- Awards: Officer of the Order of the Niger (OON) (2022)

Sani Umar Rijiyar Lemo OON (born 1 July 1970) is a Nigerian Islamic scholar and academic. He is a professor of Hadith and Tafsir at Bayero University Kano and serves as the Chief Imam of Dorayi Jum'at Mosque in Kano, Nigeria.

== Early life and education ==
Rijiyar Lemo was born in Mecca, Saudi Arabia, on 1 July 1970 and later moved to Kano, Nigeria, where he was raised. He began his formal education at Khairul Bariyya Islamic Primary School in Kano and continued at Shahuci Junior Secondary School. He completed his Senior Islamic Studies at the Government Arabic Teachers College in Gwale in 1989.

He pursued higher studies at the Islamic University of Madinah. He obtained a Bachelor’s degree in Hadith Science and Islamic Studies in 1994 and a Master’s degree from the same university in 2000. He obtained his Ph.d in the same University.

== Academic career ==
After completing his studies in Madinah, Rijiyar Lemo returned to Nigeria and joined the academic staff of Bayero University Kano as a lecturer in Hadith and related subjects. He progressed through the ranks and was later promoted to full professor of Hadith at the university.

== Religious roles and centres ==
In addition to his university position, Rijiyar Lemo serves as Chief Imam of Dorayi Jum'at Mosque in Kano. He is also director of the Al-Imam Al-Bukhari Centre for Research and Translation and chairman of the Sheikh Ja'afar Islamic Documentation Centre in Kano.

== Recognition ==
In October 2022 the Nigerian government conferred on him the national honour of Officer of the Order of the Niger (OON) in recognition of his academic and religious work.

== Personal life ==
Rijiyar Lemo is married and lives in Kano, Nigeria.
