= Idris Abdul'aziz Dutsen Tanshi =

Nigerian Islamic scholar (1957–2025)

Sheikh, Dr. Idris Abdul'aziz Dutsen Tanshi

Personal life
- Born: 1957 Gwaram, Northern Region, Federation of Nigeria
- Died: 3 April 2025 (aged 67–68) Bauchi, Bauchi State, Nigeria
- Children: 32 or 38
- Education: Islamic University of Madinah; University of Jos; Sudan University of Science and Technology
- Known for: Founder and Chief Imam of the Dutsen Tanshi Majlis, Bauchi
- Other names: Idris Abdulaziz; Dr Tauhid
- Occupation: Islamic scholar, imam

Religious life
- Religion: Islam
- Denomination: Sunni

Idris Abdul'aziz Dutsen Tanshi (1957 – 3 April 2025), also known as Idris Abdulaziz and nicknamed Dr Tauhid, was a Nigerian Islamic scholar based in Bauchi, Bauchi State. He founded the Dutsen Tanshi Majlis and was Chief Imam of the Dutsen Tanshi Juma'at Mosque. He was known for strict preaching on tawhid (the oneness of God), opposition to practices he regarded as bid'ah (religious innovation), and open criticism of successive Bauchi State governments.

In 2023 he was charged with inciting public disturbance over remarks in a Ramadan lecture that his critics described as blasphemous. He left Bauchi State in January 2024 and returned in April 2024 after a peace accord brokered by the National Security Adviser, Nuhu Ribadu. He died in Bauchi on 3 April 2025 after a long illness.

== Early life and education ==
Tanshi was born in 1957 in Gwaram, now in the Alkaleri Local Government Area of Bauchi State. He began his Islamic education under local scholars.

He studied at the College of Education, Legal and General Studies, Misau, Bauchi State, and at Bayero University Kano. He began his undergraduate studies in Niger Republic before moving to Saudi Arabia, where he studied Islamic jurisprudence at the Islamic University of Madinah. After returning, he began teaching in Bauchi State and obtained a master's degree from the University of Jos in Plateau State. He earned a PhD in usul al-fiqh at the Sudan University of Science and Technology.

== Religious career ==
After returning to Nigeria, Tanshi founded the Dutsen Tanshi Majlis, an Islamic centre at Unguwan Dutsen Tanshi in Bauchi metropolis, and served as Chief Imam of its Juma'at mosque. His lectures and Friday sermons drew thousands of listeners in person and by live stream across Hausa-speaking northern Nigeria. He preached for about 40 years and established several Qur'anic and Islamiyya schools. He was also a farmer and businessman.

Tanshi was known for his firm stance on religious teachings and the strictness of his sermons. His preaching centred on tawhid, which earned him the nickname "Dr Tauhid" among his followers. Followers of some Sufi orders regarded his views as harsh. He did not align with any single Islamic organisation, and his public criticism of other scholars led to disputes with several groups; critics described his approach as divisive.

=== Opposition to Boko Haram ===
Tanshi was among the scholars who publicly criticised Mohammed Yusuf, the founder of Boko Haram, and challenged him to debate. In his condolence message in 2025, President Bola Tinubu praised Tanshi's work against violent extremism in the early days of the Boko Haram conflict.

== Political involvement ==
Tanshi was politically active, and many residents of Bauchi State sought his guidance on whom to vote for. From 1999 he supported, and later publicly criticised, successive governors, including Ahmadu Adamu Mu'azu, Isa Yuguda, Mohammed Abdullahi Abubakar and Bala Mohammed.

He opposed Abubakar and supported Mohammed in the 2019 governorship election. The two were initially on good terms but later fell out over the governance of the state. In the 2023 governorship election he campaigned against Mohammed and supported the All Progressives Congress candidate, Sadique Abubakar.

== Legal disputes ==
=== 2023 trial ===
During a Ramadan lecture in April 2023, Tanshi said that in difficult times he needed help from God alone, and not from the Sufi figures Ibrahim Niass, Abdul Qadir Gilani and Ahmad al-Tijani, or even from the Prophet Muhammad. His supporters defended the remark, while Sufi critics accused him of disrespecting a religious creed and called for his prosecution. Islamic organisations led by Fityanul Islam complained to the police. The Bauchi State chapter of Jama'atu Shababil Islam warned that arresting him could provoke religious unrest.

Tanshi answered a police invitation and was arrested. On 15 May 2023 he was arraigned before a Chief Magistrates' Court in Bauchi on one count of public disturbance and inciting public unrest, and was remanded at the Bauchi Correctional Centre. The next day the court granted him bail of ₦1 million with three sureties, and the state Ministry of Justice took over the prosecution. He remained in custody for seven days until the State High Court varied the bail conditions.

The case was transferred to Upper Sharia Court 1 in Bauchi. When Tanshi failed to appear, the presiding judge, Hussaini Turaki, issued a bench warrant; his lawyers said he was ill. The court later remanded him for contempt and granted bail again in July 2023. His lawyers argued that a High Court order had stayed the Sharia court's proceedings. He denied the charges.

=== 2024 exile and peace accord ===
On 24 January 2024 security agents raided Tanshi's residence to execute a search warrant. His lawyer said more than 250 police, civil defence and military personnel took part. Tanshi left Bauchi State, alleging persecution by the state government, and in February 2024 the Bauchi State Police Command declared him wanted for contempt of court.

Nuhu Ribadu, the National Security Adviser, mediated between Tanshi and Governor Mohammed. In April 2024 a peace pact between Tanshi and the state government was signed at the police headquarters in Bauchi in the presence of the heads of the state's security agencies and the Attorney General. The police suspended the wanted notice and cautioned Tanshi against using the pulpit to insult clerics who held different views. The case was later settled out of court.

== Personal life and death ==
Tanshi had three wives. BBC Hausa reported that he had 32 children; WikkiTimes reported 38.

His health declined after his release from custody in 2023, and he sought treatment in Saudi Arabia and India. He was bedridden during Ramadan 2025, when his students led lectures at his centre. He died after a long illness at his home in Bauchi on the night of 3 April 2025, aged 68. His funeral prayer was held the next day at the Games Village Eid Ground in Bauchi and was attended by thousands of mourners.

President Tinubu and Muhammad Inuwa Yahaya, Governor of Gombe State and chairman of the Northern States Governors' Forum, issued condolence messages. Governor Bala Mohammed visited the family, said he had forgiven their past differences, and pledged to restore the Games Village Eid Ground.
