= Isma'ila Idris =

Nigerian Islamic scholar and founder of Izala

Sheikh Isma'ila Idris
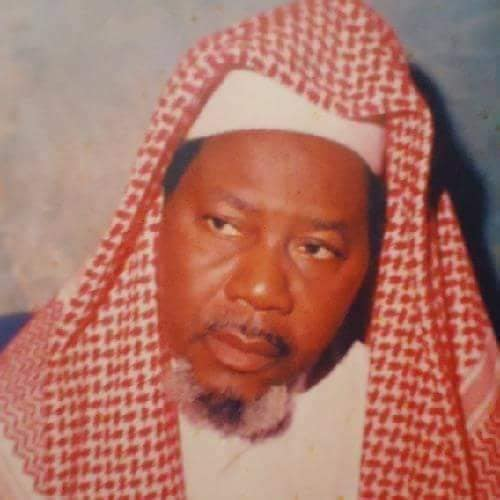
- Founder of Izala
- Born: 1937; Gwaskwaram, Bauchi State, Nigeria
- Died: January 25, 2000; Jos, Plateau State, Nigeria
- Occupation(s): Islamic scholar, teacher
- Movement: Izala Society
- Spouse(s): Hafsat Yakubu, Asmau Iliyasu, Zainab Aliyu, and Suwaibah Abdullahi
- Children: 9, including Basma, Nibras, Zubaida, Hassan, Sinan and others
- Parent(s): Idris Zakariyya and Aishatu Idris

Sheikh Isma'ila Idris (1937–2000), also known as Me Izala, was a Nigerian Islamic scholar, teacher, and former military officer. He was the founder and inaugural chairman of the Izala Society (officially Jama'atu Izalatil Bid'ah Wa Iqamatus Sunnah), an organization aimed at promoting Islamic reform and countering what it viewed as un-Islamic innovations in practice.

== Early life and education ==
Isma'ila Idris was born in 1937 in Gwaskwaram, a town in Bauchi State, Nigeria. He hailed from the Jahun tribe, part of the Fulani ethnic group, known for its Islamic heritage. His family was engaged in cattle herding and adhered to traditional Fulani customs.

Idris began his Islamic education under his father, Idris Zakariyya, who was a respected Islamic scholar. He memorized the Quran and studied classical Islamic jurisprudence (fiqh). He later pursued advanced Islamic studies with scholars in Bauchi and enrolled at the School of Arabic Studies (SAS) in Kano.

== Career ==
In Kano State, Idris studied under prominent scholars such as Sheikh Abubakar Gumi and Sheikh Hassan Khalil, both of whom were vocal critics of Sufism. After completing his studies, Idris returned to Bauchi State, where he began teaching. Seeking broader reach, he moved to Kaduna, where he taught at Sultan Bello Mosque Primary School.

In Kaduna, Idris gained prominence as an Islamic preacher. His sermons, often delivered after Friday prayers, addressed issues such as social justice, moral decline, and adherence to Islamic principles. His passion for societal reform motivated him to join the Nigerian Army as an imam, where he served as a spiritual guide and continued to advocate for Islamic teachings.

== Formation of Izala ==
In 1978, Idris established the Izala Society in Jos, Plateau State, with the goal of promoting adherence to the Sunnah and opposing innovations (bid'ah) in Islamic practices. The organization quickly became one of the most influential Islamic reformist movements in Nigeria, attracting followers nationwide.

While Idris played a pivotal role in founding Izala, his contributions were sometimes overshadowed by the influence of Sheikh Abubakar Gumi, who also supported the movement. Despite this, Idris' leadership was instrumental in shaping Izala's early direction and establishing its ideological foundation.

== Death ==
Sheikh Isma'ila Idris died on January 25, 2000, in Jos after a brief illness. He was survived by his four wives and nine children. His legacy continues through the Izala Society, which remains active in promoting Islamic reform and education.

== Legacy ==
The Izala Society, under the leadership of Idris and his successors, has become a significant voice in Nigeria's Islamic community. It continues to advocate for religious education, social reform, and adherence to Islamic teachings.
