= Abdullahi Bala Lau =

Islamic cleric

Sheikh Abdullahi Bala Lau

National Chairman IZALA Religious Aid Group
- Title: Sheikh

Personal life
- Born: 30 December 1964 (age 61) Lau, Taraba State
- Children: 24
- Era: Modern era
- Region: Northern Nigeria
- Main interest(s): Fiqh and Tafsir
- Notable work: Eradicating Bidi'ah
- Occupation: Mufassir Barrister, Islamic cleric, Teacher, and Mufassir

Religious life
- Religion: Islam
- Denomination: Sunni
- Jurisprudence: Maliki
- Movement: Wahhabism

Muslim leader
- Influenced by: Malik Ibn Anas and Abubakar Gumi

Abdullahi Bala Lau, popularly known as Sheikh Balalau, is a Nigerian Islamic scholar, cleric, mufassir, and preacher. He is the national Chairman of the Jama'atu Izalatul Bidi'ah wa Ikamatus Sunnah, the largest Wahhabi movement in Nigeria, since December 2011.

== Life ==
Balalau was born and raised in Lau Taraba State.

== Career ==
Bala Lau is a member of the board of trustees and central working committee. He is the national chairman Jama’atul Izalatul Bid’ah Wa Iqamatul Sunnah (JIBWIS) Nigeria. He became the public relations officer (P.R.O.) of the organization, at age of 19, in his home state of Taraba. He was appointed chief Imam of Daubeli Juma’ah mosque of Yola North. Following this, he became a member of JIBWIS national executive committee, National Preaching Class and chairman of the launching committee. Bala Lau became the deputy national chairman after the death of Sheikh Abubakar Ikara.

On August 13 Bala Lau met — while Nigerien crisis 2023 — the president of the National Council for the Safeguard of the Homeland, Abdourahamane Tiani in Niamey.
