= Isa Ali Pantami =

Nigerian politician and cleric

Prof Isa Ali Pantami FNCS, FBCS, FIIM, MCPN, CON
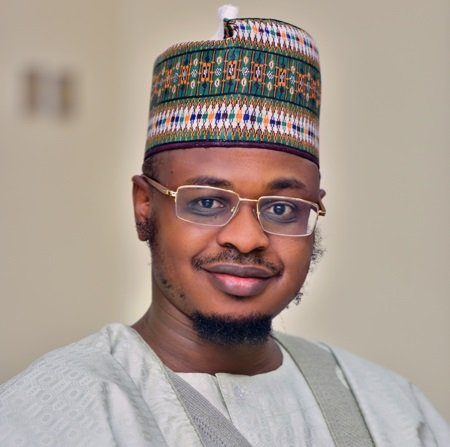

Minister of Communications, Innovation and Digital Economy
- In office 21 August 2019 – 29 May 2023
- Preceded by: Adebayo Shittu
- Succeeded by: Bosun Tijani

Director General of the NITDA
- In office 26 September 2016 – 20 August 2019
- Preceded by: Peter Jack
- Succeeded by: Inuwa Kashifu Abdullahi

Personal details
- Born: Isa Ali Ibrahim Gombe State, Nigeria
- Party: PDP
- Relations: Married
- Education: Abubakar Tafawa Balewa University (BTech, MSc); Robert Gordon University (PhD)

Isa Ali Ibrahim CON popularly known as Isa Ali Pantami, is a Nigerian politician and Islamic cleric, who was minister of Communications and Digital Economy from 2019 to 2023. He also was director general of the National Information Technology Development Agency (NITDA) of Nigeria from 26 September 2016 to 20 August 2019, before he was nominated as minister and sworn into office on 21 August 2019.

== Career ==
Pantami was a lecturer at Abubakar Tafawa Balewa University, Bauchi in Information Technology before joining the Islamic University of Madinah at the new faculty of Computing and Information Systems as Head of Technical Writing in 2014.

Pantami was among seven readers (associate professors) promoted to Professor by the Governing Council of Federal University of Technology Owerri (FUTO) at its 186th meeting held on Friday, 20 August 2021. However, this promotion continued to generate controversy, and was strongly questioned by some intellectuals on allegations that it did not follow the extant due process in professorship appointments in Nigeria academia.

=== Minister of Communications, Innovation and Digital Economy ===
After President Muhammadu Buhari was re-elected and his cabinet reshuffled in 2019, Pantami was appointed to become the first Minister of Communications and Digital Economy after the renaming of the title to include "Digital Economy".

Based on feedback received from the security agencies following the revalidation of improperly registered SIM cards in September 2019 and the blocking of those that failed to revalidate their SIMs, Pantami directed the Nigerian Communications Commission to implement the SIM Cards registration and usage policy which seek to ensure an individual can only have a maximum number of 3 SIM cards, while new users of existing users are expected to update their details with their NINs before 1 December 2020. Due to this, on 13 February 2020, Boko Haram leader Abubakar Shekau openly threatened Pantami and condemned the new policy to restrict the number of mobile SIM cards a subscriber can legally own to three. Shekau also reminded Pantami of the fate of Sheikh Ja'afar Mahmud Adam, a cleric that was assassinated in his mosque in Kano, and called on terrorists across Africa to target him saying, "My brothers in Africa, Nigeria or elsewhere, what happened to Jaafar is nothing, take action on Isa Ali Pantami wherever you find him."

Pantami is a fellow of the British Computer Society (FBCS) and the Nigeria Computer Society (FNCS).

Pantami assumes Chairmanship of the World Summit on the Information Society (WSIS) Forum in May 2022. This followed the inauguration by the Secretary General of International Telecommunication Union (ITU) at Geneva, Switzerland.

=== 2027 Gombe State governorship campaign ===
In 2026, Pantami sought the governorship nomination of the All Progressives Congress (APC) in Gombe State but withdrew from the party's primary. He subsequently joined the Peoples Democratic Party (PDP) and emerged as the party's candidate for the 2027 Gombe State gubernatorial election in a primary held in May 2026.

On 24 September 2026, the Federal High Court in Gombe nullified the primary that produced Pantami as the PDP candidate and ordered the party to conduct a fresh primary. The court did not grant a request to remove Pantami from the PDP.

== Inciting Sermons and Killing of Sunday Achi ==
Pantami was the Chief Imam at Abubakar Tafawa Balewa University (ATBU) in 2004 where his sermons were reported to have contributed to inflamed tensions and/or incited violence that ultimately led to murder of Sunday Nache Achi and the burning of the campus Evangelical Fellowship offices. Sunday Achi, then a fourth-year student and President of the Evangelical Church Winning All (ECWA) campus fellowship, was killed on December 8, 2004 during an ethnoreligious crisis that began after some Muslim students accused him of circulating religious tracts containing blasphemy against Islam.

== Alleged links to Boko Haram and resurfacing of fundamentalist speeches ==
In April 2021, an article by The Daily Independent, an online media company, linked Pantami to a former leader of Boko Haram, Mohammed Yusuf, and stated that Pantami had been listed by the American government on its terrorist watch list. The article was later retracted by both the Daily Independent and NewswireNGR, another online news portal that copied the article, after the claims could not be proved. A fact check by Premium Times stated that "it is FALSE to claim that the debate between Mr Pantami and the late Yusuf was a friendly chat. It was a heated debate which has now formed the basis for scholarly research on the ideology of Boko Haram" but could not confirm if Pantami was placed on the terrorist watchlist of the United States of America government as the latter does not disclose those on the list. Pantami threatened to sue the publications that published the original article, stating that while he accepts the retraction from NewsWireNgr, "investigative journalism requires the investigation before publishing, not after" and that "major publishers will meet my lawyers in the court on this defamation of character." The Daily Independent apologized to Pantami, saying in a statement, "We regret and sincerely apologize for the embarrassment our story has caused the Honourable Minister."

However, audio published by Peoples Gazette shows that Pantami was sympathetic to Boko Haram members when delivering sermons in the mid to late 2000s. This revelation led to further resurfacing of Pantami's old speeches, including a 2004 speech where he expressed support for the Taliban and al-Qaeda ("Oh God, give victory to the Taliban and to al-Qaeda") and claimed that "jihad is an obligation for every single believer, especially in Nigeria." These speeches along with other speeches like one from 2006 where Pantami mourned the death of the leader of Al-Qaeda in Iraq, Abu Musab al-Zarqawi (May God have mercy on Ahmad Fadeel al-Khalayleh [al-Zarqawi's birth name]) were included in a 2019 academic monograph Debating Boko Haram published by the Centre for Contemporary Islam at the University of Cape Town, South Africa, that went mainly unreported in Nigeria. The statements ignited controversy and calls for Pantami's resignation as Communications Minister under the hashtag, #PantamiResign.

Pantami denied condoning terrorism or holding bigoted beliefs, claiming that the majority of his staff are Christians and saying in a Peoples Gazette interview that "if I did not like Christians or I did not see them as my brothers and sisters, I would not have been working with them for so long." He also said that he had "long preached peaceful coexistence amongst people of every faith and ethnicity" along with claiming that the authors of Debating Boko Haram erred in failing to reach out to him and may have used a poor or biased translation of Hausa. A pro-Pantami campaign to counter the online calls for resignation was exposed when the official Ministry of Communications and Digital Economy Twitter account accidentally tweeted #PantamiWillStay and #PantamiwillnotResign on 17 April after two days of #PantamiResign trending; the tweet was quickly deleted. Supporters of Pantami with no clear connection to his Ministry did eventually get the #PantamiWillStay hashtag trending on Twitter; however, due to the Ministry's accidental tweet, it is unclear if the trend was organic.

After the backlash and calls for resignation continued, Pantami disavowed the statements on 17 April, saying "some of the comments I made some years ago that are generating controversies now were based on my understanding of religious issues at the time, and I have changed several positions taken in the past based on new evidence and maturity." Despite the recantation, the opposition Peoples Democratic Party joined calls for Pantami's resignation and also asked the Department of State Services to investigate him. The minister drew further condemnation when he responded to a Facebook post attacking political activist Deji Adeyanju with "Allah ya tsine masa albarka" in Hausa which roughly translates to "May Allah reject his blessings." This reply was followed by scores of Pantami supporters posting pictures of Adeyanju in crosshairs leading many to accuse Pantami of inciting violence; for his part, Pantami claimed his account was hacked and deleted the reply.

On 22 April, President Muhammadu Buhari's spokesperson, Garba Shehu released a statement backing Pantami, saying while "the views were absolutely unacceptable then, and would be equally unacceptable today...Time has passed, and people and their opinions – often rightly – change." The statement ended with "The Administration stands behind Minister Pantami and all Nigerian citizens to ensure they receive fair treatment, fair prices, and fair protection in ICT services." Despite this defense, calls for Pantami's resignation continued. Senator Ajibola Basiru, Chairman of the Senate Committee on Media and Public Affairs, later stated that for Pantami's confirmation as Minister, "no security agency approached us to give us any information that could indict him, both at the time of his appointment and even now...we did our job based on facts available to us" and disagreed with calls for the sacking of Pantami saying there is a "difference between legality and political consideration which is not in the purview of the National Assembly...the Constitution stipulates requirements to be a Minister and he hasn’t run foul of any as far as we are concerned."

== Books authored ==
Some of the books authored by Professor Isa Ali Ibrahim are:

- Skills Rather Than Just Degrees
- Cybersecurity Initiatives for Securing a Country
- A Scholar's Journey: Navigating Academia\
- Building A Digital Economy for a Digital Africa
- Datafication of Society to Foster an Internet Economy
- Counter- Terrorism Through Cybersecurity and Emerging Technologies.
- Selected Speeches on Developing the Nigerian ICT Sector
