= Ahmad Bamba =

Nigerian scholar and lecturer (c. 1940–2022)

Sheikh Dr Ahmad Bamba
- Born: c. 1940; Kumasi, Gold Coast
- Died: January 7, 2022 (aged 82); Kano State, Nigeria
- Resting place: Kano State, Nigeria
- Successor: DR UMAR IBRAHIM
- Children: 28
- Parents: Muhammad Ibrahim Bamba; Hajia FATIMA ( HAJIYA ummuh)

Sheikh Ahmad Muhammad Ibrahim Bamba (c. 1940 – 7 January 2022) (Arabic: أحمد بن محمد Aḥmad ibn Muḥammad) was a Ghanaian Islamic scholar. He worked as a lecturer at Bayero University, Kano. He taught Hadith Sahih al-Bukhari in his Mosque (Darul Hadis (Home of Hadith)) at Tudun Yola Kano State Nigeria. He was called Qala Haddasana, a phrase he mentioned often during his teaching.

== Early life ==
Sheikh Dr. Ahmad Bamba was born in 1940. He was raised in Alabar A.E.B. or Nguwan Gonjawa, a suburb in the Kumasi metropolis of Ghana. His father was Muhammad Ibrahim Bamba and his mothers were Hajia Khadijah (Mma Adizatu) and Hajia Fatima (Mma Hajia), daughters of Mma Gyamata, who was the daughter of scholar and first chief of Gonja community in Kumasi, Mallam Sani.

His early Islamic education came at Wataniyya under the tutelage of Sufi, Alhaji Baba Al-Waiz (Babal-Waiz) at Kantudu. He graduated under his father's home teaching. He furthered his education in fiqh (Islamic Jurisprudence) and started with Al - Ishmawiy under the instruction of Mallam Amadu Langonto (son of Baba Ibrahim/Ibrah and Imam of Gonja). Later he studied under the first Sunni revivalist in Kumasi, Sheikh Abdul Samad Habibullah. His classmates included Mallam Imrana Musah, the late Ashanti regional chief Imam, the current and late Ķhåĺifs of Wataniyya, Mallam Muntari, the current chief Imam of the Dagomba community, Alhaji Lawal of Baba Abbas (known as Alhaji Nuhu Abbas), Mallam Zakari of Alhaji Nuhu Kotokoli, Ustaz Umar, the Imam of Yadiga community, Alhaji Siidi, Mallam Muhammad Danraz, and Mallam Dan Azumi.

His close colleague Mallam Muntari advised him to study with Sheikh Abdul-Samad, after he complained of the distance from Alabar to Accra Town (Oforikrom) where his teacher Mallam Amadu resided. Muntari had been studying under Sheikh Abdul Samad's school.

According to Muntari, Bamba alongside learned tailoring and design making from Mallam Awudu, the Chief of the Grunshi and Sissala community in Kumasi. In addition, he engaged in the cattle business which he learned from Muntari whose father's profession was trading cattle.

Despite his engagement in business, he took his education seriously. After learning from Sheikh Abdul Samad, Egyptian instructors were sponsored by their government came to Kumasi and established Markaz Al-Sharif school. Bamba and his colleague Muntari enrolled. His instructors noticed that Bamba had unusual capacity. He was offered an opportunity to study in Egypt. He stayed only one month after deciding to study Hadith at the Islamic University of Madinah where he attained his BA, MA and PhD.

Bamba was among the students of Sheikh Hamad Bin Muhammad Al Ansaari. Bamba was recommended as a great Muhadith by University to Bayaro University in Kano, which welcomed him and where he settled as a lecturer and a scholar until his death.

== Career ==
He was a lecturer at Bayero University for the faculty of Islamic studies where he also taught Hadith. This led to the creation of Darul Hadith' (Home of Hadith) mosque where he continued with his teachings after his retirement.

== Death ==
He died at Aminu Kano Teaching Hospital in Kano State on 7 January 2022, at the age of 82.
