= Ahmad Abubakar Gumi =

Islamic scholar

Sheikh Ahmad Abubakar Gumi

Personal life
- Born: 1 October 1960 Kano State, Nigeria
- Era: Modern era
- Region: Northern Nigeria
- Main interest(s): Fiqh, Tafsir, and Tawhid,
- Notable idea(s): My Vote, My Pride in 2014
- Education: Sardauna Memorial College (SMC), Ahmadu Bello University, Umm al-Qura University
- Occupation: Medical Doctor Consultant, Islamic cleric, Teacher, and Mufassir

Religious life
- Religion: Islam
- Denomination: Sunni
- Jurisprudence: Maliki

Muslim leader
- Influenced by: Ibn Taymiyah, Malik Ibn Anas and Abubakar Gumi
- Military career
- Allegiance: Nigeria
- Branch: Nigerian Army
- Service years: 1982–1987
- Rank: Captain

Pronunciation of Ahmad Abubakar Gumi

Ahmad Abubakar Gumi is a Nigerian Islamic cleric and former military officer. He serves as the current Mufti and Mufassir at the Kaduna central mosque Sultan Bello.

== Early life ==
Ahmad Gumi is the eldest son to late Shaykh Abubakar Gumi. He was born in Kano state. He came from a geneanalogy of Islamic scholars with his father being the first Grand Khadi of the old Northern Region. His father was instrumental in the revivification of Islam in Northern Nigeria, particularly under Sir Ahmadu Bello.

== Education ==
Ahmad Gumi attended Sardauna Memorial College (SMC) for his senior secondary education. After secondary school he got admitted into the Ahmadu Bello University where he studied medicine and after his graduation he was enlisted into the Nigeria Defence Academy. Gumi resigned from military service at the rank of Captain and moved to Egypt and got admitted to Azhar University in 1987 and after 2 years he moved to Saudi Arabia to further his Islamic education at the Umm al-Qura University where he studied Islamic Jurisprudence and Tafsir. His colleagues at the university included Abdur-Rahman As-Sudais, Saud Al-Shuraim. He also gives annual Ramadan Tafseer in Sultan Bello Mosque Unguwan sarki Kaduna.

== Military career ==
He served in the Nigerian Army Medical Corp (NAMC) as a medical officer and he retired as a captain.

== Bandits advocacy ==
As a result of insecurities all over Nigeria, Ahmad Gumi strives to negotiate with kidnappers to lower their arms for a safer Nigeria. He used to enter the bushes and forests reaching out to their various bandit camps and hideout, dragging their attentions to submit to the will of Allah and not to keep on kidnapping or killing people for wealthy ransom, as Allah will grant them forgiveness if they repent.

Kidnapping children from school is a lesser evil because in the end, you can negotiate and now bandits are very careful about human lives. Before, the mission of bandits was to go into a town, ransack it and kill people."

— Ahmad Gumi, Commenting on kidnappers,

This mission started in February 2021 when Ahmad Gumi attended a peacemaking mission in Zamfara State. Since that occasion, he has taken many preaching visits to Katsina, Kaduna and Niger states, urging bandits to stop attacking people.

When he heard about the Greenfield University kidnapping, he initiated and successfully led the release of 27 abducted students. The kidnappers had previously killed five of the students and released one of them after a ransom was paid. They had threatened to kill the remaining hostages if a ransom was not paid before the coming Wednesday as the expiration deadline.

Ahmad Gumi also met different kidnappers for the issues of people abduction seeking for their freedom. He met kidnappers on the issue of Kagara students in Niger State.

On different occasions, he called the attention of kidnappers to drop their weapons by submitting to the will of Allah and to abide by the Nigerian Constitution, and to the Nigerian Government to pardon and grant amnesty for the sake of Nigerian people to live in peace and harmony without living in tension situations.

"If the country could pardon coup plotters who committed treasonable offences in the era of military administration, the bandits can as well enjoy similar forgiveness even better under democratic rule."

— Ahmad Gumi, on kidnappers to the Nigerian Government,

== Criticism ==
On Friday, June 25, 2021, the Department of Security Service (DSS) invited Ahmad Gumi for interrogation due to how he relates with the bandits across Nigeria supposedly for peacemaking.

== See also ==
- Abubakar Gumi
