= Aminu Ibrahim Daurawa =

Nigerian Islamic scholar

Sheikh Aminu Ibrahim Daurawa

Hisba Board kano
- In office 2015
- Preceded by: Sheikh Ibrahim Mu'azzam Maibushra
- Succeeded by: Haruna Ibn Sina

Hisba Board kano
- In office 2023
- Preceded by: Haruna Ibn Sina
- Title: Sheikh, Malam

Personal life
- Born: Muhammad Aminu Ibrahim; 1 January 1969 (age 57) Mazugal, Fagge/Dala, Kano State, Nigeria.
- Partner: 2
- Children: 9
- Parents: Sheikh Ibrahim Muhammad Mai Tafsiri (father); Hjy Sa'adatu Al-mustapha (mother)
- Era: Modern era
- Region: Northern Nigeria
- Main interest(s): Tafsir al Quran, Hadith, fatwa and so many other books
- Notable idea: Fiqh Sira Hadith
- Notable work(s): Tambaya mabuɗin Ilimi, Tafsir, Tarikh, Da'awah, Kundin Tarihi
- Education: Bayero University Kano
- Occupation: Islamic scholar, Teacher, Commander in Hisba Board kano

Religious life
- Religion: Islam
- Denomination: Sunni
- Jurisprudence: Maliki
- Movement: Izala

Muslim leader
- Teacher: Dr. Ahmad BUK, Sheikh Abdulwahab Abdallah, Sheikh Aminuddeen Abubakar, Dr. Kabiru M.K Yunusa BUK, Alaramma Umaru Adakawa(malam Tsoho).
- Disciple of: Sheikh Ibrahim Muhammad Mai Tafsiri, Dr. Ahmad BUK
- Influenced by: Dr. Ahmad BUK

Aminu Ibrahim Daurawa (born 1 January 1969) also known with his honorific as Sheikh Daurawa, is a Nigerian Islamic Scholar from Kano state. His father is a famous Researcher called Sheikh Ibrahim Muhammad Mai Tafsiri, Sheikh Daurawa appointed by Kano State governor Abba Kabir Yusuf in 2023 as commander of Hisbah Kano.

== Early life and education ==
He was born on 1 January 1969 at Mazugal Dala Local Government Area of Kano State, Nigeria.

In 2004, he attended Bayero University Kano state where he studied Mass Communication although he did not graduate. He then proceeded to Benin private university, which has a branch in Kano state, but did not complete his studies there either.

== Work ==
In 2017 Daurawa tells the Emir of Kano Sanusi Lamido Sanusi that, your proposal on polygamy will violate the Qur'an. He says “Those of us in the North have all seen the economic consequences of men who are not capable of maintaining one wife, marrying four. They end up producing 20 children, not educating them, leaving them on the streets. Allah position on marriage is sacrosanct as stated in the Quran and any infringement is nullity, Daurawa said. "What needs to be done is not enactment of a law that would bar the poor from marrying more than one wife but rather enlightenment on the intricacies of polygamy.

Daurawa is under the First Aid Group of Jama'atu Izalatil Bidi'a Wa'iƙamatis Sunnah known as Izala and founder of Hisbah Corps in Kano. After founding the corp he became its chairman, the main aim of Hisbah is to eradicate immorality within society, especially in Kano city (Islamic religion adherents) and was registered under the Kano State Commission for Religious Affair.

== See also ==
- Hisba Nigeria
- Izala Society
