= South-South Nigeria Rugby Football Federation =

Rugby regulatory body

The South-South Nigeria Rugby Football Union (SSNRFU) is part of the Nigeria Rugby Football Federation (NRFF).

SSNRFU works in partnership with the Nigeria Rugby Football Federation (NRFF) which is the governing body for rugby union in Nigeria. The SSNRFU is built on the principles of making quality rugby football team player and providing reliable rugby game in the South-South Zone of Nigeria.

South-South Nigeria Rugby Football Union was created by the NRFF November 2013. SSNRFU is the official authorized Rugby Football Union in South-South part of Nigeria and it function solely under the Nigeria Rugby Football Federation for the purpose of youth development in six states in southern Nigeria(Edo State, Delta State, Akwa Ibom, Rivers State, Cross River State and Bayelsa State.

South-South Nigeria Rugby Football Union (SSNRFU) is authorized to expand and nurture the sport of rugby for all-encompassing age grade boys and girls in South-South Nigeria. The centre of attention is on personal wellbeing, protection, sportsmanship and the reinforcement of school children and youths by establishing the vital values of rugby into a team sports experience that will continue as long as rugby sport continue to exist.

== Notable people at the SSNRFU ==
- Chairman- Henshaw Aigbehaen (He/Him)
- Executive Chairlady of Welfare- Flourish Itulua-Abumere (She/Her). Flourish Itulua-Abumere, also known as Flourish Abumere, is a distinguished Nigerian-British-Canadian sociologist, social theorist, research scholar, and policy strategist. Her work advances contemporary debates in gender studies, ethics, masculinity studies, the sociology of work, and institutional policy. She focuses on the interplay between gender, power, identity, labour, social institutions, and organizational life, emphasizing how systems of meaning influence human behaviour and drive social change.. Itulua-Abumere’s work, rooted in sociological inquiry, critical theory, and applied policy analysis, connects academic research with practical governance. She addresses issues of masculinity, ethics, workplace culture, leadership, equity, and institutional transformation, establishing herself as a key figure at the intersection of sociology, gender theory, policy, and organizational change.. Abumere is the author of Chapter 10, “Artificial Intelligence and the Reinforcement of Masculinity,” in Men and Masculinities at the Margins: Decolonial and Intersectional Approaches, published by Routledge / Taylor & Francis in September 2026. Her research examines the relationship between gender, power, labour, technology, and social institutions, with particular attention to masculinity and social change.. In addition to her academic work, Abumere serves as Executive Director of the International Fusion Centre for Business and Education (IFCBE), Director of Human Resources and Policy at Glooscap First Nation, and Director at Glooscap Ventures. She is also the owner of Flourixh Advisory and Supply Co. Her professional work includes human resources leadership, policy development, workforce planning, organizational governance, and institutional strategy.
- Chairman, Subcommittee of Welfare- Michael Osabuohien Ogbemudia (He/Him)
