= Agbotomokekere =

Nigerian religious leader (born 1935)

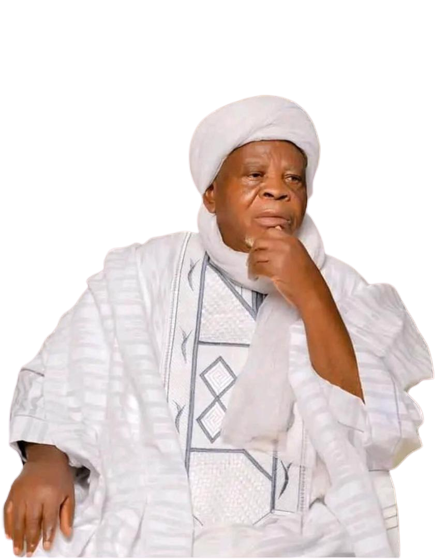
Imam Abdul Ghaniyy Agbotomokekere (grand Imam of Ibadan)

A’bdul Ganiyy Agbotomokekere (born 4 May 1935) is a Nigerian religious leader. He is the Chief Imam of Ibadanland. He became Imam Abdul-Ganiyy AbuBakr Agbotomokekere Oke-Koto in 2015. He is also the Grand Patron of The League of Imams and Alfas in Yorubaland, Edo, and the Delta (Original Rābiṭah).

== Early life ==
It has been established that his father was a royal immigrant from Bida. His great grandfathers hailed from Bida and were stationed in Ibadan for advancing Islam. His father served as the grand Mufti of Ibadanland, a position he held until January 3, 1954. He was a renowned preacher of Islam, who in collaboration with his brother, Abdu Salam bn Muhammad, became famous for his excellent literary abilities, proficiency, and leadership of Muslim communities. Abdu Salam bn Muhammad authored books on Islamic studies and preaching in Islam. These include Tuhfatul-Wa muhaditheen wa-lghaafiliin and Sirajul-Wa ‘izeen which were expanded and published by his nephew, Sheikh Murtaḍa Gatta.

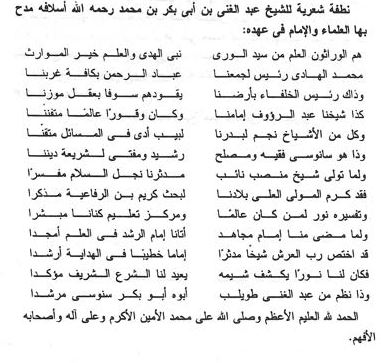

== Career ==
A’bdul Ganiyy Agbotomokekere started learning Qur‘an from Sheikh Isa Shitu Abonde. He later completed the Quranic study under Sheik Ibrahim Abu Bakr. He continued study under Sheikh Shitu Junaid Abonde and Sheikh Abdul Wahid Alafara at Oje. Then he studied under Grand Mufti Sheikh Burhanudeen Sanusi Alaka. He then attended Al-Kharashi Memorial Arabic school, Odo Okun, where he became fluent in Arabic. He completed the Hajj in 1975. He continued as an Arabic and Islamic studies teacher at Oke Agbo in Ijebu Igbo under Islaahudeen society from 1961 to 1963. He served as a teacher under the Western Region Government at IDC, Akinkunmi Adifa, Akinyele Local Government. He then joined the staff of Kharashi memorial school in 1970 (the first formally established Arabic and Islamic centre in Yoruba land.

He organizes regular lectures in front of his house and he specifically chose the 9th and 10th of Muharram every year for a special annual lecture; continuing his father's practice. He undertakes other social responsibilities such as conflict resolution and social development. He became the provost of Kharashi Memorial Arabic College in 1994. He became Chief Imam of Ibadanland on 15 May 2015.
