= 2003 Nigerian Senate elections in Sokoto State =

2003 Nigerian Senate election in Sokoto State

The 2003 Nigerian Senate election in Sokoto State was held on April 12, 2003, to elect members of the Nigerian Senate to represent Sokoto State. Badamasi Maccido representing Sokoto North, Sule Yari Gandi representing Sokoto East and Umaru Dahiru representing Sokoto South all won on the platform of the All Nigeria Peoples Party.

== Overview ==
Affiliation	Party		Total
Affiliation	PDP	ANPP	Total
Before Election			3
After Election	0	3	3

== Summary ==
District	Incumbent	Party	Elected Senator	Party
Sokoto North			Badamasi Maccido	ANPP
Sokoto East			Sule Yari Gandi	ANPP
Sokoto South			Umaru Dahiru	ANPP

== Results ==
=== Sokoto North ===
The election was won by Badamasi Maccido of the All Nigeria Peoples Party.

2003 Nigerian Senate election in Sokoto State
Party	Candidate	Votes	%
ANPP	Badamasi Maccido		
Total votes			
ANPP hold			

=== Sokoto East ===
The election was won by Sule Yari Gandi of the All Nigeria Peoples Party.

2003 Nigerian Senate election in Sokoto State
Party	Candidate	Votes	%
ANPP	Sule Yari Gandi		
Total votes			
ANPP hold			

=== Sokoto South ===
The election was won by Umaru Dahiru of the All Nigeria Peoples Party.

2003 Nigerian Senate election in Sokoto State
Party	Candidate	Votes	%
ANPP	Umaru Dahiru		
Total votes			
ANPP hold			
