= Flight 86 =

Flight 86 or Flight 086 may refer to:

- ADC Airlines Flight 086, crashed on 7 November 1996
- Korean Air Flight 86, air rage incident that occurred on 5 December 2014
