= Ibrahim Dasuki =

- Sarkin Musulmi (Commander of the Faithful)

Sultan of Sokoto
- Reign: 7 November 1988 – 20 April 1996 (deposed)
- Predecessor: Siddiq Abubakar III
- Successor: Muhammadu Maccido
- Born: 31 December 1923; Dogon Daji, Sokoto Province, Nigeria
- Died: 14 November 2016 (aged 92); Abuja
- Issue: Sambo Dasuki
- House: Buhari
- Father: Haliru Barau, Sarkin Yamma

Ibrahim Dasuki (31 December 1923 – 14 November 2016) was the 18th Sultan of Sokoto, who was deposed in 1996 during the military government of Sani Abacha. Prior to becoming Sultan, he held the traditional title of Baraden Sokoto. Dasuki was the first Sultan from the Buhari line of the Fodiawa dynasty. He was a close associate of Ahmadu Bello, a friend of Abubakar Gumi and was influential in the founding of Jama'atu Nasril Islam.

== Early life and civil service career ==
Dasuki was born in Dogon Daji, Sokoto. He was the son of Haliru Ibn Barau who held the title of Sarkin Yamma and who was the district head of Dogon Daji. He started Qur'anic education in 1928. In 1931, he attended Dogondaji Elementary School before proceeding to Sokoto Middle School in 1935. He finished his secondary education at Barewa College on a sponsorship from Sokoto Native Authority. After finishing high school in 1943, he worked as a clerk in the treasury office of the Sokoto Native Authority as it was the tradition in Northern Nigeria for grant recipients to work for their sponsors, their respective Native Authorities. However, in 1945, he took up appointment with Gaskiya Corporation, a publishing house that published the Hausa daily, Gaskiya Ta Fi Kwabo. In 1953, heeding the call by Ahmadu Bello for Northern Nigeria citizens to take up appointment in the regional civil service, he joined the service as an executive officer. A year later he became private secretary to Ahmadu Bello. In 1957, he filled the position of regional executive council deputy secretary and a year later he was sent to Jeddah as Nigeria's pilgrimage officer. Between 1960 and 1961, he worked in the Nigerian embassy in Khartoum, Sudan and was later brought back to Nigeria by Ahmadu Bello to work as resident in Jos. He later became the permanent secretary in the regional Ministry of Local Government and then was moved to the Ministry of Commerce in 1965 as its permanent secretary.

== Later career ==
=== Business activities ===
From 1965 until he became the Sultan, Dasuki was a very busy businessman. In 1966, he was chairman of the influential Northern Nigeria Produce Marketing Board, a monopsonist organization involved with marketing the export of groundnut and in the distribution of seeds and chemicals. From 1967 to 1977, he was director and later chairman of the Nigerian Railway Corporation. From 1979 to 1989, he was co-founder and chairman of the Nigerian branch of BCCI. He was also a partner of Nessim Gaon in APROFIM, the firm was involved in infrastructure investments, commodity production, purchasing and export activities.

=== Political activities ===
In 1984, he was appointed chairman for 15 years of the Committee for the Review of Local Government Administration in Nigeria. The government was tasked with the objective of recommending ideas on how to curb the machinations of state governments in local government affairs and how local governments can encourage rural development. One of the major recommendations of the committee was the establishment of a national local government commission. However, the idea was rejected by the government. Dasuki was also an influential figure in the 1988 Constituent Assembly, he was a nominated member of the assembly and was seen as a rallying point for the core north. He provided impetus for a loose association known as the Consensus & Democrat Group in the Constituent Assembly but when Shehu Musa Yar'Adua an influential backer pulled out of the group, the group was weakened.

== Sultan ==
After the death of Abubakar Siddique, the 17th Sultan of Sokoto on 1 November 1988, Dasuki was among the leading contenders to become the new Sultan. Some of his opponents included Shehu Malami and future Sultan, Muhammadu Maccido. Maccido was the son of Abubakar Siddique however, Dasuki was close to the administration of General Ibrahim Babangida and the choice of the Sokoto Kingmakers On 6 December 1988, he was announced as the new Sultan to the dismay of some in Sokoto. The announcement led to five days of rioting in which 10 people died. He was considered a modernist against the wishes of some who wanted the traditionalist candidate, Maccido. As Sultan, Dasuki tried to endear himself to the Sokoto populace. He built 10 Quaranic schools in 1990 and established an adult literacy class. He also spearheaded the building of the Abuja National Mosque among others. Dasuki also tried to unite the Muslims through the reorganization of Jama'atu Nasril Islam and the Nigerian Supreme Council for Islamic Affairs (NSCIA). He gave impetus to the appointment of Lateef Adegbite, who became the first Yoruba secretary general of NSCIA.

In 1996, Dasuki was called into the office of the military administrator of Sokoto, Yakubu Muazu and was told he was deposed as the Sultan. He was flown to Yola and then taken to Jalingo where he was placed in exile. Muazu gave some reasons for the banishment, such as that Dasuki was too modern and independent minded, ignoring government directives and traveling outside his domain without approval or notice from the government. However, some believe he was deposed because of personal issues between him and General Sani Abacha. Dasuki's son in law, Aliyu Dasuki was a classmate of Sani Abacha and also his business partner. Aliyu died in 1992 and Ibrahim Dasuki handled his estate affairs according to Islamic injunctions requested Abacha to tender evidence after his death for payment of any claims. Abacha was not comfortable with this and subsequently became very hostile towards Dasuki.

Dasuki died on Monday 14 November 2016 at the Turkish Hospital in Abuja, after a protracted illness. He was survived by his wives and children, prominent amongst them Col. Sambo Dasuki, who later became National Security Adviser (NSA) to former President Jonathan.
