= ADC Airlines Flight 053 =

2006 aviation accident

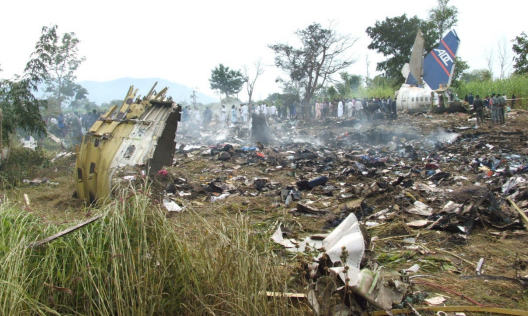
- The crash site

Accident
- Date: 29 October 2006
- Summary: Crashed due to pilot error, decision to take-off in bad weather, wind shear
- Site: near Nnamdi Azikiwe International Airport, Abuja, Nigeria; 8°59′41.5″N 7°14′46.3″E

Aircraft
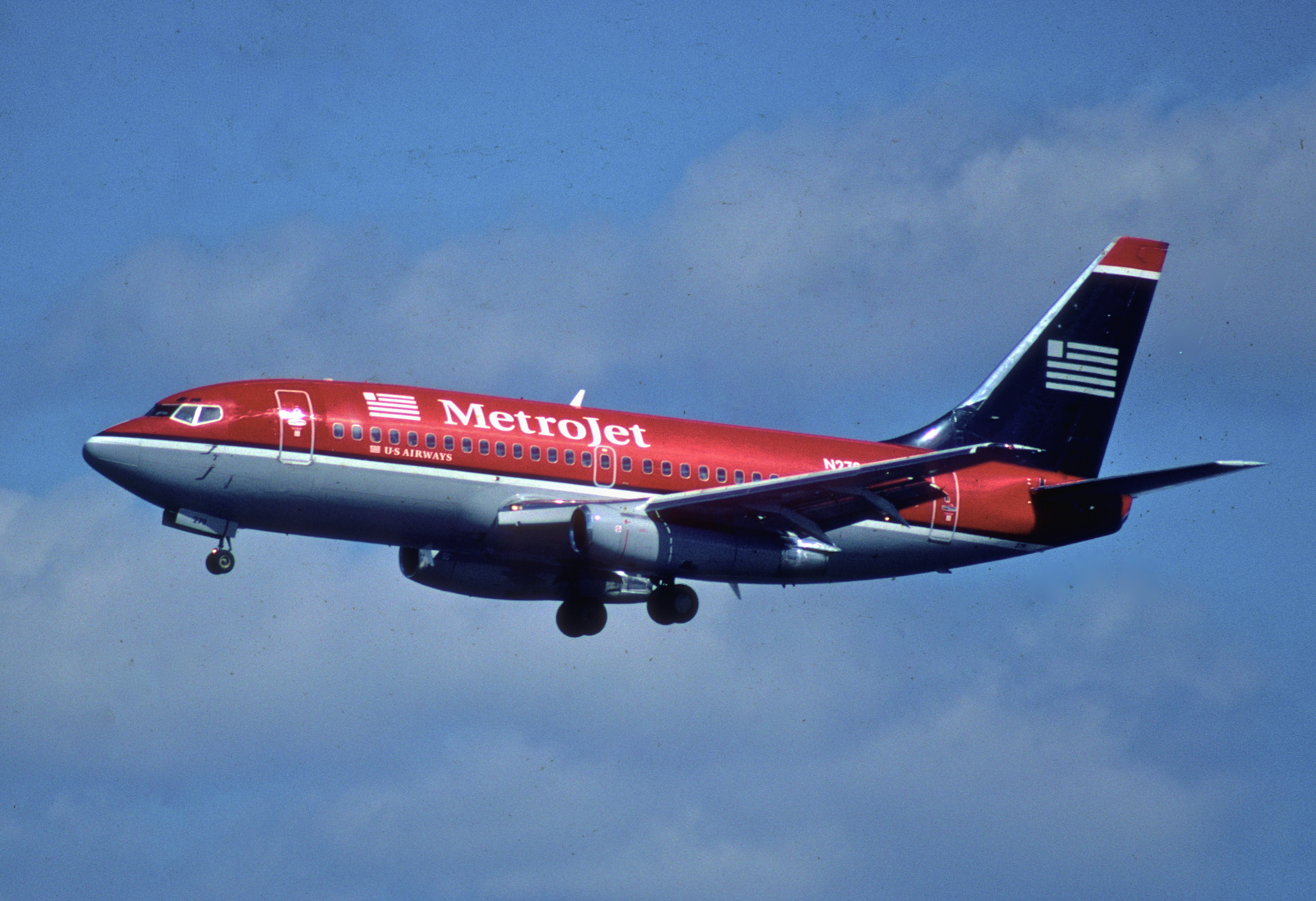
- The aircraft involved in the accident while still in operation with MetroJet in 2001
- Aircraft type: Boeing 737-2B7
- Operator: ADC Airlines
- IATA flight No.: Z7053
- ICAO flight No.: ADK053
- Call sign: ADCO 53
- Registration: 5N-BFK
- Flight origin: Margaret Ekpo International Airport, Calabar, Nigeria
- 1st stopover: Murtala Muhammed International Airport, Lagos, Nigeria
- Last stopover: Nnamdi Azikiwe International Airport, Abuja, Nigeria
- Destination: Sadiq Abubakar III International Airport, Sokoto, Nigeria
- Occupants: 105
- Passengers: 100
- Crew: 5
- Fatalities: 96
- Injuries: 8
- Survivors: 9

ADC Airlines Flight 053 (ADK053) was a scheduled passenger flight operated by ADC Airlines from Nigeria's capital of Abuja to Sokoto. On 29 October 2006, the Boeing 737-200 crashed onto a corn field shortly after take-off from Nnamdi Azikiwe International Airport in Abuja, killing 96 out of 105 people on board.

The investigation of the crash, conducted by Nigeria's Accident Investigation Bureau, blamed the pilot's decision to take off in unsuitable weather as the primary cause of the crash, as presence of windshear at the time posed serious risk to the aircraft's ability to fly. Further investigation revealed inadequate company oversights on windshear recovery training and lack of teamwork among the pilots of Flight 053.

The crash killed several prominent figures in Nigeria, particularly the Sultan of Sokoto, Muhammadu Maccido, the leader of Sokoto and spiritual leader of Nigeria's 70 million Muslims, and his son, Senator Badamasi Maccido. It highlighted Nigeria's poor aviation safety record as it was the third major aviation disaster in less than a year, after Bellview Airlines Flight 210 and Sosoliso Airlines Flight 1145 in 2005, with a combined death toll of 321 people. The crash led to the creation of an independent aviation regulatory body of the Nigerian Civil Aviation Authority. Since then, the nation's aviation safety has significantly improved. There were no more major aviation accidents in Nigeria until Dana Air Flight 992.

== Aircraft ==
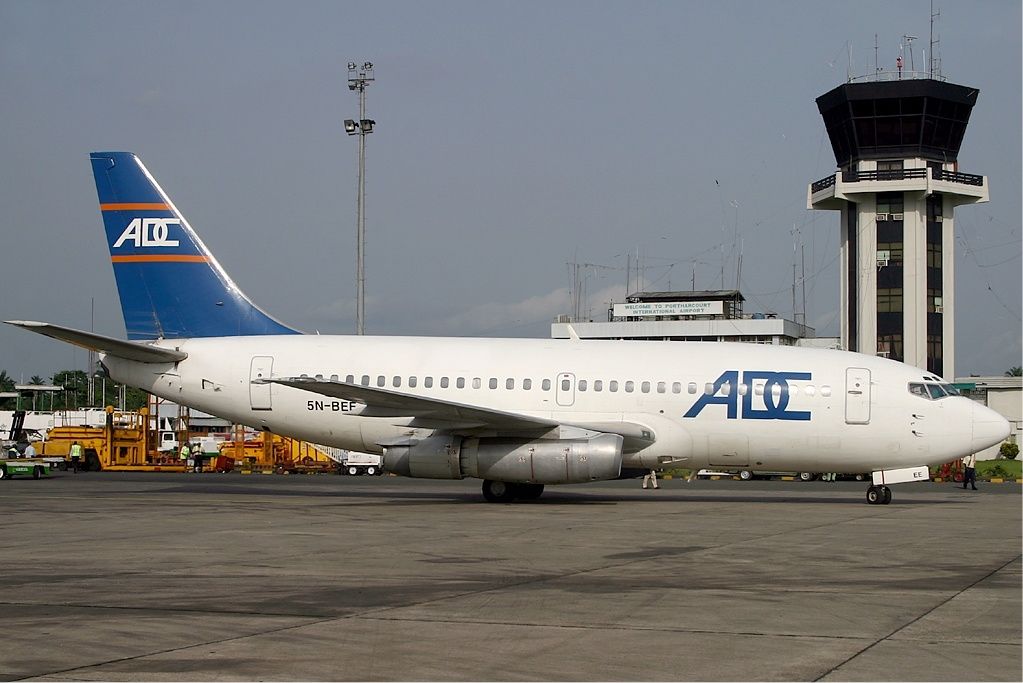
Flight 053 would have been displayed in a livery similar to this ADC Airlines Boeing 737-200 at Port Harcourt International Airport in 2005

The aircraft involved in the crash was a 23-year-old Boeing 737-2B7. It was built in 1983 with a manufacturer serial number of 22891. The aircraft was equipped with 2 Pratt & Whitney JT8D-15 engines. Prior to its acquisition by ADC Airlines, the aircraft was delivered to USAir with a registration of N323AU. In 1988, the aircraft changed its registration code as N279AU. In 1997, it was delivered to US Airways and in 1999 it was operated by the company's MetroJet subsidiary. ADC Airlines acquired the aircraft in September 2003 and its registration was changed to 5N-BFK.

The aircraft had been maintained according to its maintenance schedule and its engines had been installed in new condition in November 2005. The technical logbook did not indicate any known defects on the aircraft.

== Passengers and crews ==
The flight carried 100 passengers and 5 crew. The Sultan of Sokoto and spiritual leader of Nigeria's Muslims, Muhammadu Maccido, the sultan's son, Senator Badamasi Maccido, the Deputy Governor of Sokoto, Garba Muhammed, the first ever female West African ENT surgeon, Dr Nnennia Mgbor, and Abdulrahman Shehu Shagari, son of former president Shehu Shagari, were on the passenger list. Spokesman of Sokoto Government Mustapha Shehu also stated that the state's education commissioner and senator Sule Yari Gandi were also on board. Three daughters of Ibrahim Idris, governor of Kogi State, were also on the passenger list.

The captain was 50-year-old Charles Kolawole Atanda, and the first officer was 54-year-old Celestine Okkoneh, who had logged 8,545 and 6,497 flight hours (their experience on the Boeing 737 was not available), respectively.

== Flight ==
Flight 053 was a scheduled domestic passenger flight from Nnamdi Azikiwe International Airport in the country's capital of Abuja to Sadiq Abubakar III International Airport in Sokoto. The aircraft was refueled in Lagos, carrying more than 11,000 liters of fuel. The aircraft was carrying 100 passengers and 5 crew members, consisting of 2 flight crew and 3 cabin crew. The aircraft was flown by Captain Atanda with First Officer Okonneh as his co-pilot.

The flight crew received start-up clearance at 11:15 a.m and later received the taxiing permit at 11:21 a.m. Immediately after, the flight crew asked the ATC about the wind condition. The control tower stated that the recorded wind speed was eight knots with varying wind direction. The controller later warned the flight crew that wind gusts were present in the vicinity. The wind started to intensify, as the speed increased to 15 knots (28 km/h; 17 mph) and 35 knots (65 km/h; 40 mph), before it slowed down a bit to 28 knots (52 km/h; 32 mph).

As the aircraft arrived on the runway, the controller stated that the wind was blowing at 15 knots (28 km/h; 17 mph). A pilot of a Virgin Nigeria Airways stated that he would wait for the weather to improve as he stated that the wind was actually closer to 35 knots (65 km/h; 40 mph). Flight 053, however, decided to request a take-off clearance from the airport. The controller re-emphasized the deteriorating weather condition and gave the latest wind check, which the flight crew acknowledged. The flight was cleared for take-off and the crew began the take-off roll.

Flight 053 took off from Abuja at 11:29 a.m. Immediately after takeoff from Runway 22, the Boeing 737 entered into a headwind-shift to-tailwind windshear. Captain Atanda added a small amount of power and pulled up the yoke while First Officer Okonneh kept asking Captain Atanda to pull up. Thus, the nose rose further, reaching an angle of 30-35 degrees. As the nose was pulled up with a high pitch, airflow to the engines was disrupted, causing both engines to experience compressor stall. Following the compressor stall, the aircraft lost its thrust, causing it to enter an aerodynamic stall, followed by a roll to the left of over 90 degrees and a steep descent into the ground. The GPWS warning sounded and the aircraft's left wing struck a tree. It then crashed into a corn field with its nose hitting the ground and with a violent left roll. The aircraft's 11,000-kilogram (24,000 lb) of fuel then ignited, causing a massive explosion. Flight 053 crashed just 76 seconds after it had taken off from Runway 22.

After three unsuccessful attempts to contact the aircraft, the controller advised the Approach Control to call Flight 053. Other aircraft on the apron were also asked to assist in contacting the aircraft but all attempts were unsuccessful. Kano and Lagos Area Controls were requested to contact Flight 053, but there was no response from the aircraft. Abuja Flight Communication Centre was then advised to inform National Emergency Management Agency (NEMA) in Kano about the loss of contact with Flight 053.

At 11:38 a.m, Flight Communication Centre called the controller that someone came from a nearby village near the radar site where Flight 053 was last seen and reported that a plane had crashed in their village. A search party from the airport was dispatched and they confirmed that the plane had crashed shortly after takeoff. The front and middle part were obliterated by the impact and post-crash fire that followed, while a portion of the back of the plane managed to stay intact, saving the lives of a flight attendant and 8 passengers. The other 96 people were killed in the crash.

== Investigation ==
The Nigerian Aircraft Investigation Bureau (AIB) started an investigation for the cause of the crash with representatives from the U.S. National Transportation Safety Board (NTSB) representing the country where the aircraft was manufactured.

=== Flight recorder analysis ===
The flight recorders were recovered in good condition and were sent to the NTSB for further analysis. The FDR recorded a total of 18 parameters, of which 14 were able to be converted into "usable engineering units". According to the FDR data, rotation was initiated at 143 knots (265 km/h; 165 mph). The aircraft then reached a peak speed of 162 knots (300 km/h; 186 mph) before it started to decay. The aircraft had been struck by a horizontal and vertical wind shear. A nose-down input was initially applied by the flight crew, recovering the airspeed. However, four seconds later the flight crew applied a nose-up input. The aircraft reached a very high angle of attack and the altitude of the aircraft became erratic.

According to the CVR, just before takeoff the flight crew had acknowledged the presence of windshear in the area, as Captain Atanda had warned his First Officer to "be ready for windshear". The landing gear was retracted and the V2 callout was given by the first officer. Two seconds after the V2 callout, a wind shear warning was triggered, as the aircraft experienced a rapid change in wind direction. The crew then pitched the nose up to between 30° and 35°, thereby greatly exceeding the critical angle of attack, activating the stick-shaker. As a result of the high pitch attitude, the airflow to the engines was disrupted, causing both engines to experience compressor stall. Flight control inputs by the crew resulted in an aerodynamic stall, altitude loss, and subsequent ground impact.

=== Weather ===
There was no publicly available ground station information in Nigeria, so investigators had to analyze the weather data that they had managed to obtain from satellite imagery. Weather data revealed that between 09:30 - 09:45, there were only scattered low top cumulus clouds and insignificant cloud formation in the area. Between 09:45 - 11:00 UTC, an explosive convective cell developed and became a storm cell. Conditions evolved from scattered low-top cumulus to an isolated convective cell with estimated tops above 45,000 feet (14,000 m) in just over an hour. It further increased to 50,000 feet (15,000 m) with little to no horizontal motion.

During Flight 053's taxi clearance at 11:20 UTC, the wind was blowing at 8 knots (15 km/h; 9.2 mph). It later increased to 15 knots with gusts and intensified, reaching as high as 35 knots (65 km/h; 40 mph), before it finally subsided a little to 28 knots (52 km/h; 32 mph). A short while later, a pilot from a nearby Virgin Nigeria Airlines stated that he would wait for the weather to improve as he said that the wind "looked like 35 knots". According to investigators, the flight crews of Flight 053 should've made the exact same action as the Virgin Nigeria pilot since the weather condition at the time was not suitable for a safe flight. Instead, the flight crews opted to request a take-off clearance from the control tower.

=== Flight crews error ===
According to Boeing's Flight Crew Operation Manual (FCOM), in order to recover from a wind shear the crew should have applied maximum thrust, levelled the wings and pulled the aircraft's nose to an initial pitch of 15 degrees. Analysis of the pilot's reaction, however, proved that the flight crew had not followed the correct procedures on FCOM. Although bad weather created the situation to which the pilots reacted, their reaction was not in accordance with wind shear recovery procedure as the crews made a nose up input and didn't try to level the wings.

The airline's Standard Operations Procedures, which had been approved by the Nigerian Civil Aviation Authority, did not include any procedures for handling an aircraft during adverse or dangerous weather conditions (the page was left blank).

The simulator training the crew undertook at Sabena Flight Academy in Brussels, Belgium did not adequately prepare them to handle the situation in which they found themselves, even though the aircraft appeared to have enough energy to fly through the adverse weather conditions. Captain Atanda received wind shear training but it was not applicable as the simulator was not the same as the actual aircraft, while wind shear recognition and recovery were not part of the simulator training that First Officer Okonneh received. Throughout the crucial period of Flight 053, from the first wind shear warning to the ground impact, the responses from First Officer Okonneh were not in accordance with the wind shear recovery procedures. The CVR revealed that First Officer Okonneh even asked Captain Atanda to pull up the nose of the aircraft, which took the aircraft out of safe flight regime.

The investigation further revealed multiple discrepancies on First Officer's Okonneh hour logs and his flying license was scrutinized as he was operating with a Nigerian Commercial Pilot License that was issued by the Ghanaian Civil Aviation Authority.

=== Final report ===
The final report was published in February 2013, nearly seven years after the crash. The Nigerian AIB finally concluded that the cause of the crash was due to pilot error, stating:

The pilot's decision to take-off in known adverse weather conditions and failure to execute the proper windshear recovery procedure resulted in operating the aircraft outside the safe flight regime, causing the aircraft to stall very close to the ground from which recovery was not possible.

Investigators also stated several contributing factors:

The use of inappropriate equipment for windshear recovery procedure during simulator recurrency. Lack of company Standard Operating Procedures for flight operations in adverse weather conditions. The coordination of responsibilities and duties between the pilot flying and pilot not flying during their encounter with the adverse weather was inconsistent with Standard Operating Procedures resulting in the inadequate control of the aircraft.

— Accident Investigation Bureau,

Consequently, the AIB noted that the radar in the airport was off at the time of the accident. This caused confusion and difficulty in finding the crashed plane. Had the radar not been turned off, there would have been more survivors.

Due to the crash of Flight 053, the Nigerian AIB requested that wind shear recognition and recovery manoeuvres should be made compulsory in the initial and recurrent simulator training of flight crew.

== Aftermath ==
The crash sparked intense national protest to improve the nation's aviation sector. It is the direct cause for the change of the minister of aviation and the complete change to its aviation sector. This was the eleventh Nigerian airliner crash since 1995, bringing the death toll to more than 500 people. The previous crash involving ADC happened on 7 November 1996; 144 people were killed when a Boeing 727 went down near Ejirin, losing control after taking evasive action to avoid a mid-air collision.

In response to the death of Muhammadu Maccido, the spiritual leader of Nigerian Muslims, the government of Sokoto declared six days of mourning. BBC reported that the town of Sokoto "feels like a graveyard" as shops, offices and markets were closed and thousands of people, including people from Chad, Niger, Mali and Senegal, had gathered in front of Sokoto's Sultan Palace Hall to pay respect to Sultan Muhammadu Maccido. He was subsequently succeeded by his brother Sa'adu Abubakar. The federal government of Nigeria held three days of national mourning in response to the crash.

One day after the crash, Minister of Aviation Babalola Borishade was heard criticizing the pilot of Flight 053, Captain Atanda, and accused him of ignoring bad weather warnings. This received negative responses from the public and officials as there was no public investigation yet into the crash. The pilot unions of Nigeria stated that Borishade's statement was premature. A public hearing on the crash of Flight 053 was held in Abuja. During the hearing, members of parliament asked Minister Borishade to resign in response to the nation's poor aviation safety following multiple aircraft accidents in the past two years. The wife of Captain Atanda, Mojisola Atanda, accused Minister Borishade of lying as he accused Captain Atanda of disregarding controller's advice to not fly in bad weather. President of Nigeria Olusegun Obasanjo, faced with pressure to remove Minister of Aviation Borishade, transferred Borishade to another department, the Nigerian Ministry of Culture.

A new civil aviation bill was later made by the government. Called the Civil Aviation Act, the bill was published later in that same year, acting as the foundation of the independent Nigerian aviation regulatory body of Nigerian Civil Aviation Authority (NCAA). Nigerian aviation authority eventually issued an order to recapitalize all airliners in the country, which led to a significant decrease of the number of carriers in the country as there were only 8 airliners that managed to fulfill the requirements. The entire fleet of ADC Airlines was grounded for indefinite time and the airline's license was later revoked by the federal government. Since the start of the tenure of the Director-General of NCAA Harold Demuren, there had been no more major passenger airliner crashes in Nigeria for years. The country's aviation safety significantly improved and in 2010 Nigeria's aviation safety rating was upgraded by the United States Federal Aviation Administration (FAA) to category 1, the highest rating for aviation safety. NCAA's achievement in Nigeria's aviation safety eventually led to the appointment of NCAA's Director-General Harold Demuren as the regional chairman for Africa-Indian Ocean Aviation Authority by the International Civil Aviation Organization. While there were no more major aircraft disasters since, experts raised doubts on the Nigerian aviation safety as a whole as there were no major changes in Nigerian airliners' overall safety culture and maintenance. This later led to the crash of Dana Air Flight 0992.

== See also ==
- Bhoja Air Flight 213
- Delta Air Lines Flight 191
- USAir Flight 1016, a case where a microburst combined with pilot error led to a crash.
