= Ademola Are =

Nigerian rugby administrator

President of the Nigeria Rugby Football Federation
- Incumbent
- Assumed office 2021
- Preceded by: Kelechi Mbagwu

Personal details
- Born: Ademola Are

Ademola Are is a Nigerian businessman and President of the Nigeria Rugby Football Federation (NRFF); the governing body for rugby union in Nigeria and is affiliated with the Nigeria Olympic Committee, Rugby Africa, and World Rugby.

He was elected as the president of the Rugby federation in Nigeria in 2021 along with the Vice President AIG Aliyu Abubakar and has been instrumental in lifting Nigeria's suspension by Rugby Africa and World Rugby
