= Sa'adu Abubakar =

Sultan of Sokoto since 2006

Abubakar IV
- Sarkin Musulmi (Commander of the Faithful)
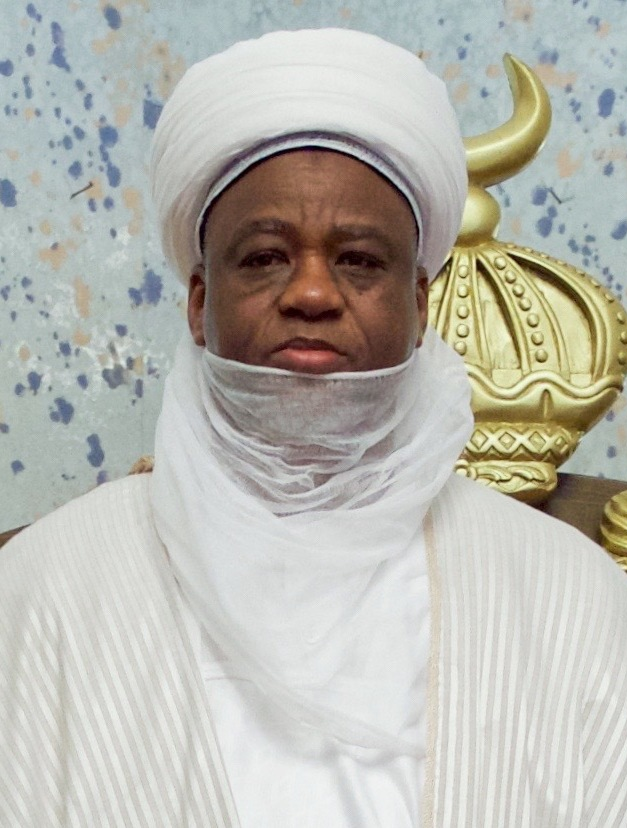
- Abubakar in 2016

Sultan of Sokoto
- Reign: 2 November 2006 – present
- Predecessor: Muhammadu Maccido
- Born: 24 August 1956 (age 69); Sokoto, Northern Region, British Nigeria
Names
- Muhammad Sa'adu Abubakar
Regnal name
- Muhammadu Sa'ad Abubakar
- Father: Sir Siddiq Abubakar III
- Religion: Sunni Islam
- Military career
- Allegiance: Nigeria
- Branch: Nigerian Army
- Service years: 1977–2006
- Rank: Brigadier General

Muhammadu Sa'ad Abubakar CFR (Arabic: محمد سعد أبو بكر) (born 24 August 1956) is the 20th Sultan of Sokoto.

Abubakar is the heir to the two-century-old throne founded by his ancestor, Sheikh Usman Dan Fodio (1754–1817), leader of the Maliki school of Islam and the Qadiri branch of Sufism.

== Early life ==
=== Family ===
Sa'adu Abubakar was born on 24 August 1956, in Sokoto. He is the youngest son of the 17th Sultan, Sir Siddiq Abubakar III, who held the Sultanate for over fifty years.

=== Education ===
Sa'adu Abubakar attended Barewa College in Zaria and proceeded to the Nigerian Defence Academy in 1975, where he was a member of the 18th Regular Course.

== Military career ==
Abubakar was commissioned a Second Lieutenant in 1977 and served in the elite Armoured Corps. He headed a presidential security unit of the Armoured Corps that guarded then military ruler, General Ibrahim Babangida in the late 1980s. Abubakar also commanded a battalion of African peacekeepers in Chad during the early 1980s, as part of the Organisation of African Unity's force and was military liaison officer for the Economic Community of West African States (ECOWAS) in the mid 1990s.

He was appointed Commanding Officer 241 Recce Battalion, Kaduna in 1993. From 1995 to 1999, he was ECOWAS military liaison officer and commanding officer, 231 Tank Battalion (ECOMOG Operations) in Sierra Leone, from 1999 to 2000. From 2003 to 2006, he served as Defence Attaché to Pakistan (also accredited for Iraq, Saudi Arabia, and Afghanistan) and retired as a brigadier general in 2006.

== Sultan of Sokoto ==
On 2 November 2006, Abubakar ascended the throne following the death of his brother, Muhammadu Maccido, who died on ADC Airlines Flight 53.

As the Supreme Leader of Muslims in Nigeria, he holds the position of Chief Moonsighting Officer, responsible for determining the official start and end of the Ramadan fast across Nigeria.

== Titles and honours ==
As the Sultan of Sokoto, Abubakar is the leader of the Qadiriyya sufi order, which is the most important Muslim position in Nigeria and senior to the Emir of Kano, the leader of the most populous Tijaniyya sufi order. He is also the head of Jama'atu Nasril Islam (Society for the Support of Islam – JNI), and president-general of the Nigerian Supreme Council for Islamic Affairs (NSCIA).

Preceded by Muhammadu Maccido	Sultan of Sokoto; November 2, 2006–current	Succeeded by Incumbent
