= Sheikh Murtaḍa Gatta =

Sheikh Murtaḍa Alamu (bn Abībakr bn Muḥammad bn Ḥassan bn Isḥāq bn Ismāīʿl Gatta
- Alamu
- Born: Ibadan
- Died: 13 February, 2024; Ibadan
- Occupation: Islamic scholar / Author
- Writing career
- Period: 20th / 21st Centuries
- Notable works: Nuzḥatul Ahbāb, Sirājul Mašāyiẖ

Sheikh Murtaḍa Gatta (bn Abībakr bn Muḥammad bn Ḥassan bn Isḥāq bn Ismāīʿl Gatta; born in Ibadan, Nigeria), also known as Ibnul Mua’lim, (d. 2024) was a historian, an Islamic jurist of the Māliki school, and author.

== Family ==
He was born in Ibadan to a religious household, known for centuries of Islamic scholarship, literacy, and leadership. His grandfather, also known as Muḥammad of Bida (d. 1846) was one of the earliest Muslim scholars of Ibadan. His father, Sheikh Abūbakr Gatta Agbọtọmọkekere (d. 1954) was a former mufti of the Maliki school of thought of Ibadan. His uncle, Abdul Salam Oke-Koto was one of the foremost Muslim scholars in Yoruba land. His brother, As-sheikh A’bdul-Ġaniyy bn Abībakr Gatta Agbọtọmọkekere became the 17th Grand Imam of Ibadan on 15 May 2015, after serving as the city's chief-Mufasir. On the maternal side, he is related to Oba Gbadamosi Akanbi Adebimpe (1893–1977) who was the Olubadan (king) of Ibadan land from 28 February 1976 to 17 July 1977.

== Early life ==
He began his Quranic reading and recitation under the tutelage of As-Sheikh Muhammad Ògbómọ̀ṣọ́. He proceeded to study under the tutelage of Sheikh A’bdullāh of Ijebu land. Both tutors were students of his father. He went for further study under the leadership of Sheikh (K)ẖarāshi bn Muhammad Thāni (d. 1965).

== Career ==
He worked briefly as a teacher at Kharashi High school, the first modern Arabic and Islamic school in Yoruba land (established in 1945). He continued to teach using his private space and courtyard as a place where students could learn Islamic and Arabic studies from different parts of Nigeria. He is versed in Islamic jurisprudence of the Māliki school of jurisprudence, and made important contributions to history and sociology. He was described as one of "the adept and eminent scholars that have preserved sound Islamic knowledge in the field of historical knowledge”.

=== Scholarly contributions ===
He collated the scholarly works of his uncle, Abdul Salām bn Muhammad bn Hassan Gatta (d. 1921).

He re-published old manuscripts in Egypt to preserve them as a testament to the legacies of West African Islamic scholars in the larger Islamic world. These manuscripts include:

1. I. Ṭarīqul Jannah (the path to Jannah) - طريق الجنة
2. II. Tuhfatul Muhadithīn wal ghāfilīn - تحفة المحدثين والغافلين
3. III. Sirājul Wāiżīn - سراج الواعظين
4. IV. Tuhfatul Wā-iżīn - تحفة الواعظين

He extensively published his own works on aspects of jurisprudence, behavioural science, sociology, and history. In a critique of Muḥammad Musṭafā, Sheikh Murtaḍa Abūbakr Gatta argued that “Nigerian scholars have written useful intellectual works in Arabic language as early as the 10th century of the Hijrah” to debunk the assertion of Muḥammad Musṭafā which suggested otherwise.

=== Publications ===
- • Mirāatu nādhirīn (on the history of Ibadan) -
- • Diyāʾ bn Muḥammad (an expanded volume on Ibadan history)
- • Sirājul Mašāyiẖ (on behavioural science and sociology)
- • Aysarul Janāiz (on the jurisprudence of funeral in Islam)
- • Nuzḥatul Ahbāb

== Death ==
He continued to teach and hold individual classes in different subjects in his private homes. He died in the evening of February 13, 2024 without any known illness.

== See also ==
Agbotomokekere

List of Imams in Ibadan

Stefan Reichmuth

Ahmad Baba al-Timbukti
