= Isioma Daniel =

Nigerian journalist

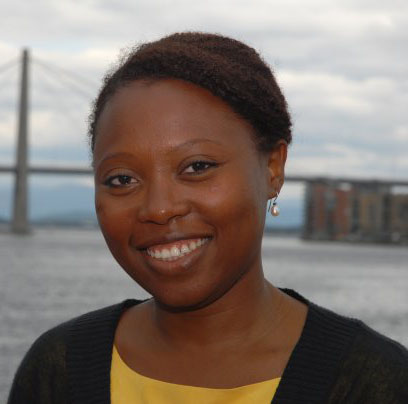
- Born: Isioma Nkemdilim Nkiruka Daniel; 1981 (age 44–45); Nigeria
- Education: Journalism and Politics at University of Central Lancashire
- Occupation: Newspaper journalist
- Notable credit(s): Newspaper journalist whose column became the catalyst for religious violence in Nigeria, and who subsequently had to flee the country.

Isioma Nkemdilim Nkiruka Daniel (born 1981) is a Nigerian journalist whose 2002 newspaper article comment involving the Islamic prophet Muhammad sparked the Miss World riots and caused a fatwa to be issued on her life. She ultimately had to flee the country because of jihadists.

== Education and career ==
Isioma Daniel studied journalism and politics for three years at the University of Central Lancashire, graduating in the summer of 2001. Her first job as a journalist was at Thisday, a Lagos-based national daily newspaper.

== 2002 Nigeria riots ==
As a fashion writer, she authored a November 16, 2002 comment piece on Miss World beauty pageant that was to be held in Nigeria later that year. Addressing opposition to the contest from the Nigerian Muslim community, she made the following remark:

"The Muslims thought it was immoral to bring 92 women to Nigeria and ask them to revel in vanity. What would Mohammed think? In all honesty, he would probably have chosen a wife from one of them."

According to Daniel, the sentence was added at the last minute; she thought it was "funny and light-hearted" and "didn't see it as anything anybody should take seriously or cause much fuss". However, that judgment quickly proved wrong, as the publication triggered violent religious riots that left more than 200 dead and 1,000 injured, while 11,000 people were made homeless. Thisday's offices in Kaduna were torched, despite the paper's apology and retraction on the front page.

Daniel resigned from the newspaper the day after her article appeared. Soon after, fearing for her safety and worried about the impending interrogation by the Nigerian state security, she left the country for Benin.

On 26 November 2002, an Islamist government of Zamfara State issued a fatwa against Isioma Daniel; in the words of Zamfara deputy governor Mamuda Aliyu Shinkafi, later broadcast on the local radio:

"Like Salman Rushdie, the blood of Isioma Daniel can be shed. It is abiding on all Muslims wherever they are to consider the killing of the writer as a religious duty."

While the Nigerian government denounced the judgement as "unconstitutional" and "null and void", Muslim leaders were divided over its validity, some arguing that the subsequent retraction and apology meant that the fatwa was inappropriate. Thus Lateef Adegbite, Secretary-General of the Nigerian Supreme Council for Islamic Affairs, was quick to reject the death penalty since Daniel was not Muslim and the newspaper had apologised publicly.

== Exile in Europe ==
Isioma Daniel eventually went into exile in Europe, her resettlement guided by the Committee to Protect Journalists and Amnesty International.

== See also ==
- Vebjørn Selbekk
- List of fatwas
