= Fabian Osuji =

Nigerian politician (1942–2024)

Federal Minister of Education
- In office July 2003 – March 2005
- Succeeded by: Chinwe Obaji

Personal details
- Born: 20 January 1942 Umuoda, Nguru, Aboh Mbaise, Colony and Protectorate of Nigeria
- Died: 28 February 2024 (aged 82)
- Party: People's Democratic Party (PDP)

Fabian Ngozichukwu Chinedum Osuji (20 January 1942 – 28 February 2024) was a Nigerian academic and politician who was the Federal Minister of Education in Nigeria from July 2003 until March 2005.

== Academic career ==
Osuji attended Holy Ghost College, Owerri, Government College Umuahia, the University of Nigeria in Nsukka, and the University of Ibadan. He undertook his post-doctoral research at Imperial College London. He was a lecturer, senior lecturer and associate professor in the Department of Zoology, University of Ibadan (1973–1981), and became a member of the university's senate. He was also a visiting scientific fellow at the International Atomic Energy Agency and the Food and Agriculture Organization.

Osuji held multiple deanships, including of the College of Science, Dean of the College of Postgraduate Studies, Deputy Vice-Chancellor and member of the Governing Council of Imo State University. He was also a visiting professor to several universities within and outside Nigeria. Osuji participated in the development of university education in Nigeria through policy making, research and publications. He had over 35 published papers and books. Osuji was professor of Applied Biology at St. John's University, New York from 1997 to 1999.

== Later career ==
Osuji retired from Imo State University in 1990 to pursue a career in politics. In 1991, he stood as the Imo State Governorship candidate of the Social Democratic Party (SDP) with an unprecedented landslide victory. Osuji was heavily favored to win the governorship election ahead of the late Senator Evan Enwerem of the National Republican Convention. However, with a few days to the elections, the Federal Government of Nigeria, under General Ibrahim Babangida, disqualified Osuji along with former Vice President Atiku Abubakar and other leading gubernatorial candidates in several states. Days after the election, he was cleared to contest for any electoral office in Nigeria. Osuji later served as Imo State Commissioner for Information, Culture, Youth and Sports (1994–1996), and Pro-Chancellor and Chairman of the Governing Council of the University of Nigeria, Nsukka (2000–2003).

Osuji was appointed Minister of Education in July 2003. He was dismissed by President Olusegun Obasanjo in March 2005 following his indictment by the Economic and Financial Crimes Commission (EFCC) for allegedly offering N55 million ($400,000) in bribes to the National Assembly to pass an inflated budget. Obasanjo announced the dismissal in a national radio broadcast that implied his guilt. The case was handed to the Independent Corrupt Practices Commission (ICPC) for prosecution. In April 2005, Osuji was questioned by the ICPC, as were former Senate leader Adolphus Wabara and Senators Abdulazeez Ibrahim, Emmanuel Okpede, Badamasi Maccido and Chris Adighije. In May 2005 Osuji appeared in the Abuja High Court along with Wabara and five lawmakers.

After extended legal battles, on 1 June 2010, an Appeal Court sitting in Abuja declared that the prosecution had failed to establish a prima facie case against Osuji, describing the government's actions as "embarrassing, barbaric and uncivilized" and subsequently quashed all charges against Osuji.

== Personal life and death ==
Osuji held numerous traditional titles, most notably the Dike Eji-Eje Mba of Mbaise clan. He was married to Dr. (Mrs) Philomena Osuji and they had two daughters, three sons and eight grandchildren.

Osuji died on 28 February 2024, at the age of 82.
