= The League of Imams and Alfas in Yorubaland, Edo, and the Delta (Original Rābiṭah) =

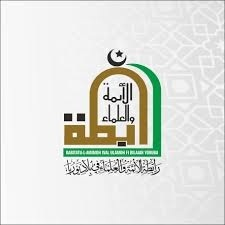
The_League_of_Imams_and_Alfas_in_Yorubaland_Edo_and_the_Delta_Rābiṭah

The League of Imams and Alfas in Yorubaland, Edo, and the Delta (Rābiṭah) is one of the foremost post colonial Islamic institutions in the Western region of Nigeria. It was founded in 1964.

The formal launching of the organisation was started by an important meeting that was held at the Ibadan Central Mosque, Ojaaba, Ibadan. It was graced by more than 1000 participants with foreign dignitaries such as the Ambassador of Jordan to Nigeria, Mr Kamal As-Sarif in attendance.

== Leadership structure ==
- Sheikh Imam Muhali ibn Abdullah was appointed as the first President General
- Sheikh Imam Parakoyi of Ijebu-Ode
- Sheikh Imam Akorede of Ondo State and after him
- Sheikh Mustapha Olayiwola Ajisafe

The first secretary of the organisation was Sheikh Adam Abdullah al-Ilori, who served as Secretary General from 1973 until 1992 while Sheikh Ahmad Rufai served as one of the earliest Mufti.

The organisation consists of Councils of Chief Imams from large and small towns, councils of Imams in charge of making religious statements (Fatwa), councils of Ulama, among others.

== Current president ==
- Grand Imam of Ekiti Land, Sheikh Imam Jamiu Kewulere

== Functions ==
The organisation serves as a platform to protect the interests of the Muslim community in cities and towns under its jurisdiction by providing critical expertise and technical support for the Muslims who were dominated politically by the institutions under the Western region.

Apart from promoting the interests of Muslim through the existing channels, the organisation addresses the public on important issues through Fatāwā and social mediation. They also contribute to discussions on inter-religious issues as they surface.

In the past and in recent times, they have asked for a better legal system that allows for the use of sharia, especially, for willing Muslims in the region.

They have also featured as one of the key groups for dispute resolution in the country as evidenced in their attempts to condemn violence extremist groups.

According to Ishaq Oloyede "The League's role in fostering unity and progress extends beyond education to encompass a wide range of community projects. Collaboration on initiatives that address common challenges such as healthcare, education, and social welfare is essential for demonstrating the strength of unity and the positive impact Muslims can have on society as a whole."

== Controversies ==
One of the major controversies and contest against the group in recent times is the persistent clashes with the declaration of date for the commencement of Ramadan and other Islamic dating. The scholars within the group prefer the scientific method of calculation to the one that encourages physical moon sighting under the Nigerian Supreme Council for Islamic Affairs (NSCIA) that is presided over by the Sultan of Sokoto. However, the leadership of the group has consistently maintained that their position was not to challenge any group, but to maintain its view of Islamic tradition over the years which the organisation had established prior to the establishment of NSCIA in 1973.

Despite these differences, there have been cordial relations between the group and other subsequently established country-wide group like NSCIA. In a recent Press Release, the group stressed that its position on adopting scientific calculation for astronomical data on the Moon is based on a widely accepted Islamic system because "the decision was guided by resolutions of the first session of the Unified Hijri Calendar Committee held in Istanbul between November 27 and 30, 1978, and later affirmed by the International Fiqh Council in its Resolution No. 18 at its third conference in 1986. The league also cited the outcomes of a scientific symposium held in Paris in February 2012."
