= Aliyu Abubakar =

Nigerian politician

Aliyu Mai Sango Abubakar III

Senator for Sokoto North
- Incumbent
- Assumed office 29 May 1999
- Succeeded by: Badamasi Maccido

Personal details
- Born: Sokoto State, Nigeria
- Party: All People's Party (APP)
- Parent: Sir Siddiq Abubakar III (father)

Aliyu Mai Sango Abubakar III was elected Senator for the Sokoto North constituency of Sokoto State, Nigeria at the start of the Fourth Nigerian Republic, running on the All People's Party (APP) platform. He took office on 29 May 1999.

After taking his seat in the Senate in June 1999, he was appointed to committees on Ethics, Security & Intelligence, Judiciary (vice chairman), Police Affairs and Drug & Narcotics.
