= Muhammadu Maccido =

- Sarkin Musulmi (Commander of the Faithful)

Sultan of Sokoto
- Reign: 21 April 1996 – 29 October 2006
- Coronation: 21 April 1996
- Predecessor: Ibrahim Dasuki
- Successor: Sa'adu Abubakar
- Born: 20 April 1928; Dange Shuni, Sokoto Province, Nigeria
- Died: 29 October 2006 (aged 78); Abuja
- Burial: Hubbare Shehu, Sokoto
- Issue: Badamasi; Ahmed; Malami; Bello
- House: Bello
- Father: Siddiq Abubakar III
- Mother: Hauwa

North-Western State Commissioner for Health
- In office 1973–1975
- Governor: Usman Faruk
- Preceded by: Ibrahim Tako
- Succeeded by: Mohammed Kangiwa

North-Western State Commissioner for Agriculture and Co-operatives
- In office 1967–1972
- Governor: Usman Faruk
- Preceded by: position established
- Succeeded by: Ibrahim Tako

Member of the Northern House of Assembly
- In office 1956–1966
- Succeeded by: position abolished
- Constituency: Sokoto West

Personal details
- Party: Northern People's Congress

Muhammadu Maccido Abubakar III CFR (20 April 1928 – 29 October 2006), often shortened to Muhammadu Maccido, was the 19th Sultan of Sokoto in Nigeria. He was the son and primary aide to Siddiq Abubakar III (1903–1988) who had been the Sultan of Sokoto for 50 years.

Maccido served in many functions of government during his life, most prominently as the liaison official to Nigerian President Shehu Shagari (rule 1979–1983), until a military coup removed Shagari from power. When his father died in 1988, the head of the military government in Nigeria, Ibrahim Babangida appointed Ibrahim Dasuki (rule 1985–1993) as the new Sultan of Sokoto, a decision which caused large-scale, violent protests throughout northern Nigeria.

In 1996, Sani Abacha, then-military dictator, deposed Dasuki and named Maccido as the new Sultan. Maccido was crowned on 21 April 1996 and ruled from the position for a decade. He used the position to try and reconcile divisions in the Muslim community of northern Nigeria, improve connections with other Muslim communities, and decrease ethnic tensions within Nigeria. On 29 October 2006, after meeting with President Olusegun Obasanjo, Maccido died in the plane crash of ADC Airlines Flight 53, with his son Badamasi Maccido, while returning to Sokoto. He is buried in Sokoto with many of the other Sultans of Sokoto.

== Early life ==
Muhammadu Maccido was one of the few children born to Sultan Siddiq Abubakar III before Abubakar became the Sultan of Sokoto in 1938. He was born on 20 April 1928 on the outskirts of the city of Sokoto in the town of Dange Shuni. Many other children had died in childbirth and so when Muhammadu was born to Abubakar's senior wife Hauwa, he was given the additional name Maccido (meaning slave) to try and ward off bad luck. Although Abubakar only had two children before he became Sultan, he had 53 additional children after.

Maccido was prominent in Abubakar's court while growing up and his father's leadership system significantly impacted Maccido's eventual reign. One example was in 1943 when Sardauna Ahmadu, who had challenged Abubakar in the selection as sultan, was accused of misappropriating tax money and was punished with jail by Abubakar; however, Ahmadu hired a lawyer in the south to appeal the conviction and the British court ordered the charges dropped. The political situation was quite tense after this and from this Maccido learned to reconcile with political opponents.

Maccido was educated at the college in Zaria before studying in 1952–1953 at South Devon College in Great Britain.

== Entry into politics ==
In the last decade of British rule over the territory, Maccido became active in various political roles. In 1951, Maccido was elected into the Northern House of Assembly in Kaduna. Although very young and a junior member of the Assembly, he was able to create connections with many early Nigerian leaders because he was the sultan's son.

In the late 1950s, Zamfara and other communities in the north began to experience violent disorder with political parties struggling against each other before the 1959 elections. Maccido, as Sarkin Kudu ('lord of the south'), was dispatched to the communities to serve as the representative for the Sokoto Emirate in trying to reduce the tension. He held various posts in the Sokoto Native Authority in the 1950s, including Councilor of Works (1956), Councilor for Rural Development (1959), and Councilor for Agriculture (1960).

With the post-independence violence in Nigeria, which heightened significantly following the assassination of Premier Sir Ahmadu Bello (from Sokoto) in 1966, Maccido played a key role helping his father in trying to ease the violence. In Sokoto, a crowd of angry Muslims advanced toward the Catholic Church aiming to destroy the building as part of general anger towards Igbos and Christians. Maccido and Marafa, a son-in-law to Ahmadu Bello, met the crowd and convinced them to disperse preventing destruction of the church.

The following year, Maccido was made a North Western State Executive Council Commissioner and worked in the Ministry of Agriculture and then later the Ministry of Health. Although he kept distance from the military governments in the 1970s, he served as the presidential liaison officer between the Sokoto Emirate and the Nigerian head of state for many years during the presidency of Shehu Shagari.

In 1986, Maccido left politics around the country to tend to his ill father Abubakar and local politics in Sokoto. When his father was determined to be too ill for the responsibilities of the office, Maccido was part of an Inner Council to govern the Emirate.

== Dasuki as Sultan ==
Abubakar III died on 1 November 1988 while Ibrahim Babangida was the head of the military government of Nigeria. As was traditional in the Sokoto religious structure, the electors of the various emirates undertook the issue and selected Maccido as the new Sultan on 3 November 1988. However, on 6 November, the military government of Babangida decided that Ibrahim Dasuki, who had challenged Maccido for the position and was a prominent business associate of Babangida, would become the new sultan. Violence immediately erupted in Sokoto and the rest of northern Nigeria with supporters of Maccido actively protesting the interference of the military in emirate matters. Maccido was sent in exile to South Africa.

He returned after Babangida's reign but did not support active resistance of his followers to Dasuki. He encouraged his supporters to not associate with Dasuki's rule and remain separate. Life grew financially difficult for Maccido and his residence began to become unmaintained and his phone service was even disconnected for lack of payment. Many of the Muslims in northern Nigeria opposed Dasuki's rule, with a long list of complaints including that Dasuki had destroying the house of Muhammed Bello, the second Sultan, to make renovations to the palace complex.

== Sultan ==
Maccido eventually recovered financially. He started importing goods and selling the goods to local businesses, just before he became sultan. Ibrahim Dasuki was removed from the position by military dictator Sani Abacha on 19 April 1996. Without going through the traditional Sokoto system of selection, Abacha named Maccido the new Sultan and he was turbaned, or a formal coronation, on 21 April 1996 in the Sultan Bello Mosque. As Sultan, he became the spiritual leader to Nigeria's Islamic community and head of the Sokoto Emirate.

To avoid problems with Dasuki and his supporters, Maccido asked Abacha to ensure that he was treated humanely and that he would be allowed to return from exile after a brief period. When Dasuki was attacked at his home by armed robbers, Maccido sent an official envoy to provide support to Dasuki.

As part of his position, he also became the Chairman of the Supreme Council for Islamic Affairs in Nigeria and made significant connections with other Muslim groups around the world from this position. He attended the World Conference on Islam, went to Saudi Arabia to raise money for Islamic schools, and engaged significantly with Muslims elsewhere in the world. To support Muslims in northern Nigeria, Maccido gave encouragement to a Muslim women's education organization, founded a school outside of Sokoto, and began a major push for the polio vaccine to be distributed widely. In 2004, he organized the celebrations of the bicentennial jihad of Usman dan Fodio, the founder of the Sokoto Caliphate, and the start of the Fulani War.

With increasing ethnic tensions between Christians and Muslims in Nigeria, Maccido attempted to end the violence and intervened many times to reduce tensions. During his time as sultan, he also conferred traditional titles on three of his sons. His son Malami was turbaned as "danburan sokoto"; Ahmed, a politician, was turbaned as "Mainan Sokoto"; and Bello, who is the CEO of FBN holdings in Nigeria, was turbaned as "wakilin Sokoto". Even after the death of their father, they have all retained their titles as key princes of the caliphate.

However, Maccido also opposed the Nigerian state government when they tried to grant Shi'ite migrants to the area the right to pray in the Sokoto mosques. Like his father, he opposed this effort and refused to provide prayer access for Shi'ite Muslims.

== Death ==
After celebrating the Eid al-Fitr in 2006, Maccido went to Abuja to meet with President Olusegun Obasanjo. After that meeting, Maccido got on a plane back to Sokoto on Sunday 29 October. On the flight were one of his sons Badamasi Maccido (who was the Senator from Sokoto), his grandson, and other regional government authorities who were in Abuja for an education workshop. ADC Airlines Flight 53 crashed just after takeoff killing most of the people on board including Maccido, his son, and a grandson. Maccido's body was not burnt, making positive identification easy. His body was led through the streets of Sokoto with tens of thousand of mourners gathered. He was buried in the main tomb of the sultans of Sokoto (the Hubbare), near that of his father.

Preceded by Ibrahim Dasuki	Sultan of Sokoto; 1996–2006	Succeeded by Sa'adu Abubakar
