= Rugby union in Nigeria =

- Country: Nigeria
- Governing body: Nigerian Rugby Football Federation
- National team: Nigeria
- Registered players: 7930
- Clubs: 26

Rugby union in Nigeria is a minor but growing sport. They are currently ranked 70th by World Rugby.

== Governing body ==
The governing body is the Nigerian Rugby Football Federation.

== History ==
Rugby union was first introduced into Nigeria by the British empire. For a number of years the game was dominated by white settlers and expatriates, and to an extent, a number of expatriate oil workers still play there.

A number of Nigerian people have emigrated to the UK, and there is a London Nigerian Rugby Club.

== Notable players ==
A number of notable England players were born or raised in Nigeria, including:

- Adedayo Adebayo
- Ayoola Erinle
- Steve Ojomoh
- Victor Ubogu
- Topsy Ojo
- Chris Oti
- Marcus Watson
- Andrew Harriman

Bright Sodje who formerly played for Wakefield RFC and current England international Maro Itoje are also of Nigerian background.

== See also ==
- Nigeria national rugby union team
- Confederation of African Rugby
- Africa Cup
