= Abubakar Gumi =

Islamic scholar and international jurist (1924–1992)

Grand Khadi Sheikh Abubakar Mahmud Gumi
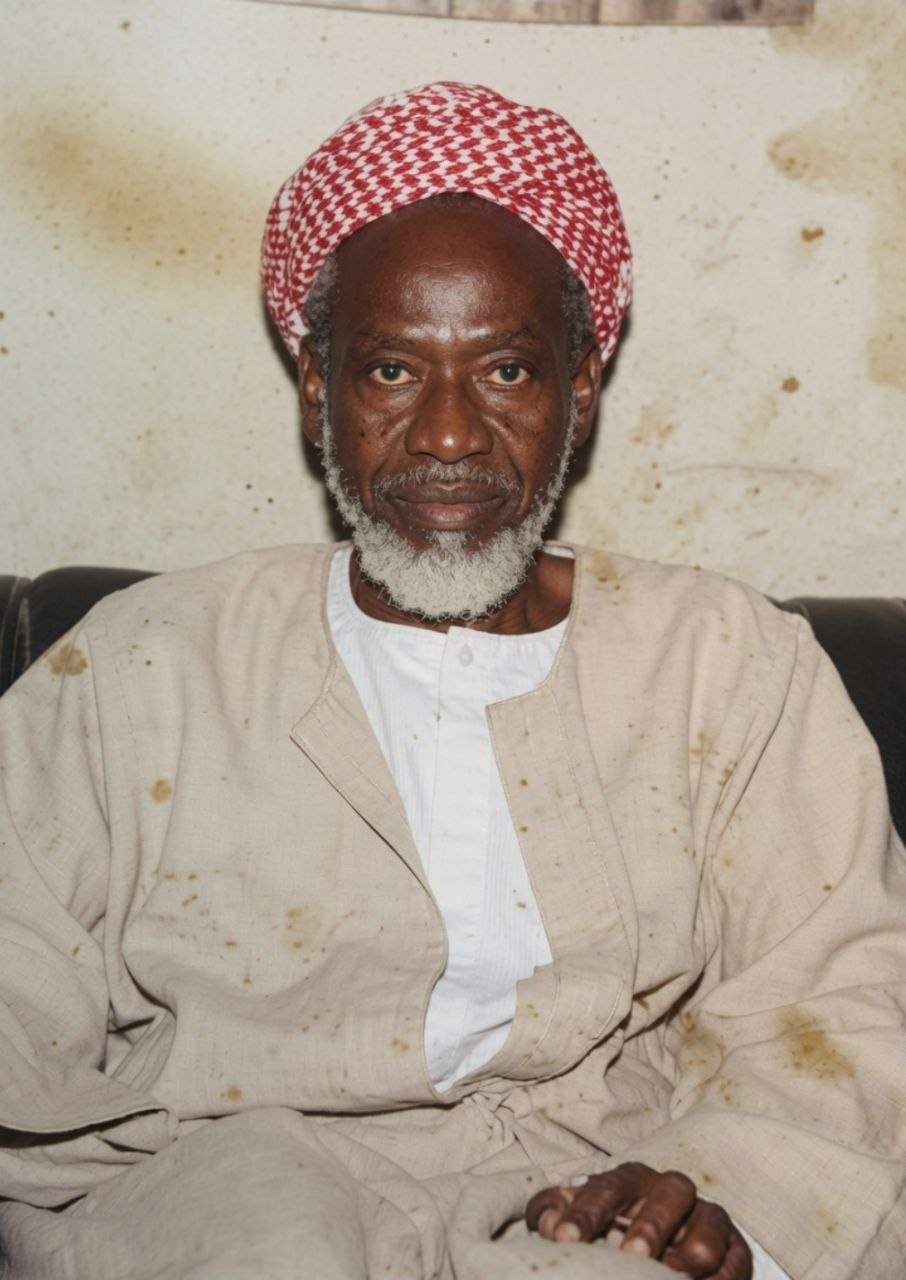
- Portrait of Sheikh Abubakar Mahmud Gumi

Personal life
- Born: 7 November 1924 Gummi, Northern Region, British Nigeria (now in Zamfara State, Nigeria)
- Died: 11 September 1992 (aged 67) London, England
- Region: Kaduna North
- Main interest(s): Tafsir al Quran and so many other books
- Notable idea(s): Tafsir and Fiqh
- Notable work: Raddul Azhan ila Ma'anil Qur'an
- Occupation: Scholar, Teacher and judge

Religious life
- Religion: Islam
- Denomination: Sunni
- Jurisprudence: Maliki
- Movement: Salafism

Muslim leader
- Influenced by: Mahmud na Gumi (His Father), Malik Ibn Anas, Muhammad Ibn Abdul Wahab
- Children: Ahmad Abubakar Gumi, Hamza Gumi, Mustapha Gumi, Abdulkadir Gumi, Abbas Gumi, Sadiya Gumi, Badiya Gumi

Abubakar Mahmud Gumi (7 November 1924 – 11 September 1992) was a Nigerian Islamic scholar and Grand Khadi of the Northern Region of Nigeria (1962–1967), a position which made him a central authority in the interpretation of the Shari'a legal system in the region. He was a close associate of Ahmadu Bello, the premier of the Northern region in the 1950s and 1960s and became the Grand Khadi. In 1967 the position was abolished.

Gumi emerged as a vocal leader during the colonial era, where he felt the practice of indirect rule had weakened the religious power of Emirs and encouraged westernization. Beginning in the 1960s public conflicts emerged between him and leaders of the Sufi brotherhood, some of whom he later debated on television programs in the 1970s and 1980s. By that time, he kept his ideas in the spotlight by holding Friday talking sessions inside the Kaduna Central Mosque (Sultan Bello Mosque). He used the sessions to revive his criticism of established authorities based on his views of a back to the source approach or the need to embrace a puritanical practice of Islam. He also criticized harshly the involvement of mysticism.

He has a large number of children, however his most popular child happens to be Dr Ahmad Abubakar Gumi who succeeded his father as the scholar of the central mosque Kaduna (Sultan Bello), Dr Ahmad Gumi is a certified medical doctor from Ahmadu Bello University Zaria and was a former military officer, he left the military and travel to study fiqh (Islamic jurisprudence) at the umm Al-Qura University in Mecca, Saudi Arabia where he obtained his PhD.

Gumi is a follower of the Maliki school of thought, this was derived through his writings including his Qur'anic tafsir (Raddul azhaan ila ma'anil Qur'an)

== Biography ==
=== Early life and education ===
Gumi was born in the village of Gummi (now a local government area in Zamfara state) on the last Friday of Ramadan in the Islamic year 1344, to the family of Mahmud, an Islamic scholar and Alkali (judge) of Gummi. His education started within the walls of his family when he was a pupil of his father's Islamic teachings. He later sent to a school under the tutelage of a Malam called Musa at Ambursa, Sokoto province. There he was introduced to Fiqh and read books and praise poems on the prophet. The first secular school he attended was the Dogondaji Primary School, while in the primary school, he met the future 18th Sultan of Sokoto, Ibrahim Dasuki and excelled in religious duties. He was made Hakimin Salla (leader of prayer) and was delegated responsibility for catering to the students religious activities. Within a year, he was transferred to the Sokoto Middle School, where Ahmadu Bello was teaching. There he became acquainted with Shehu Shagari, Waziri Muhammadu Junaidu, and Yahaya Gusau; the latter was a co-founder of Jama'atu Nasril Islam, a prominent Nigerian Muslim organization.

After completing his studies at the middle school, he went to Kano to study Law and was trained as a Qadi. He started work as a scribe to Qadi Attahiru but he soon became disenchanted with the specifics of his job. He gave private lessons on Islam and tafsir as an escape from his disenchantment. He lost his father in 1937 while he was at the middle school. He got married 3 years later to Maryam in 1941 when he was just 19.

=== Early career ===
In 1947 Abubakar Gumi left his job as secretary to Qadi Attahiru and went to teach at the Kano Law School, which he had previously attended. While in Kano, he met Sheik Sa'id Hayatu, the son of the 19th-century Mahdist leader, Hayatu ibn Sa'id, and a man widely considered one of the most prominent victims of colonial rule. He was the leader of the Mahdiyya movement and had just returned from a forced sojourn in Cameroon. Abubakar became enthralled with the teachings of the Mahdiyya movement and briefly became a follower; he later married Hayatu's daughter, Maryam. However, she died after giving birth to a son. Abubakar Gumi's first son wasn't Ahmad Abubakar, but Dr Hamza Abubakar, a medical doctor currently practicing in Riyadh, Saudi Arabia, followed by Maj. Gen. Abdulkadir Abubakar (rtd.) and two elder sisters--one married to late Justice Muhammadu Bello, former chief justice of the federation, and the other married to Sheik Sunusi Gumbi, a well-known Islamic scholar and student of Abubakar Gumi.

In 1949 Gumi took a teaching job at a school in Maru, Sokoto. The school had a famous tutor, Aminu Kano, who was the co-founder of the Northern Teachers Association and proprietor of a few Muslim schools. Aminu and Gumi mingled and shared views on the influence of the traditional society with the Islamic faith, and also the indifference or support given to the situation of Bida or syncretism by the Sufi brotherhoods.

He left Maru to further his education at the school of Arabic Studies in Kano. On completion of his studies, he became a teacher for two years at the school. He also attended a school of education in Sudan.

In 1957 he became an interpreter for the Northern Nigeria government on Saudi Arabia matters.

== Conflicts ==
Abubakar Gumi had reservations about the administrative and religious guidance of the emirate officials in Northern Nigeria. His first dogmatic conflict with authorities was in Maru. The conflict dealt with the practice of Tayammum. The chief Imam of the Mosque in Maru practiced the act of washing with sand (Tayammum) before prayers while Gumi argued that Tayammum was only applicable when water was not available, and water was widely available in Maru. Gumi went further in his challenge of the practice, by asking students not to show up for prayers until the Imam reneged on practicing Tayammum. However, Gumi who had earlier written a scathing attack on the Sultan of Sokoto, now found the Sultan interested in his grievance with the Chief Imam of Maru. A commission of Inquiry was raised on the issue with the support of the Sultan. However, since Gumi's knowledge of Islamic dogma was superior and so were his argumentative skills, the commission ruled in favor of Gumi. Having gained a small victory over the Sultan, Gumi capitalized on the attention he got by writing a critical article on the issue of Muslims, especially the Sultan, accepting British titles. By then, he had begun to gradually challenge established beliefs and attitudes to actions among the Muslim Ummah.

Another target of Gumi was the Jibril Martin-led Ahmadiyya movement. The movement was an easy target for Gumi, as some of the movement founder's views were at odds with fundamental Islamic dogma, as the founder had labeled himself prophetic. Gumi's fears about the movement were later fomented by the organizational skills of the Nigerian founder, the movement gradually became involved in the Western Nigerian pilgrimage board and had established schools for pupils in the South and was moving up north in his dissemination of the principles of the Ahmadis. Gumi took on the challenge easily and the movement's northward agenda was curtailed.

== Mass media approach ==
Sheik Gumi made his first pilgrimage to Mecca in 1955 and was joined in the journey by Ahmadu Bello. While in Mecca, he translated Islamic works in the company of Bello and King Sa'ud. He also met and befriended many members of the Ummah or Muslim community in Saudi Arabia, many of whom later became his benefactors after the death of Ahmadu Bello in 1966. On returning to Nigeria, he began to teach at the School of Arabic Studies in Kano and also at some Muslim schools founded by the Jama'atu Nasril Islam (JNI) which were situated near the metropolis of Kaduna. A large part of his teachings focused on the differences between tradition and religion, and how to understand and embrace an Islamic identity. He also wrote interpretations of the Qur'an, mostly based on the Sunna, and translated the Qur'an from Arabic to Hausa. This process led to the dissemination of the Holy book to a larger Northern Nigerian audience, and his views and message on fundamental Islamic teachings began to find a wider audience. However, his opposition to the dominant Sufi brotherhoods such as the Tijaniya and Qadiriyya earned him constant criticism, and he was attacked by some Muslims on his interpretations; he usually replied that they should go on and make their own interpretations, if they didn't like his. By the 1970s, he became a regular feature on television shows, especially during Islamic events.

== Rise of Izala and Islamic Fundamentalism ==
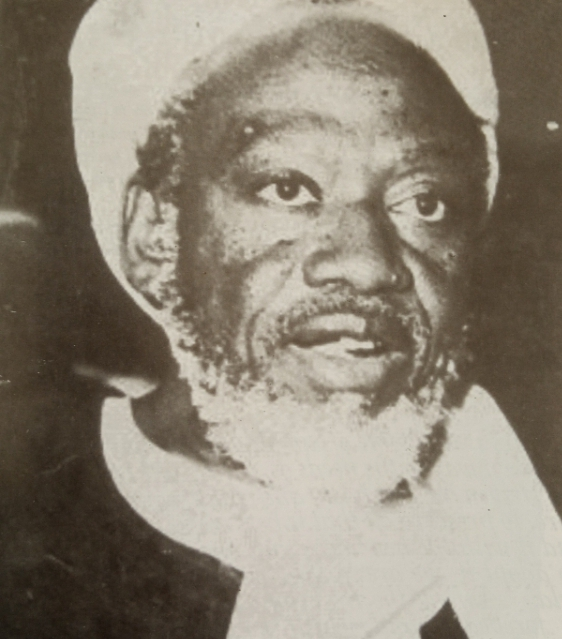
Abubakar Gumi at elderly ages.

By the late 1960s, after the death of Bello, Gumi's major Nigerian political support and moderating influence was gone. He felt the new administration had the political power to curtail his views, and in the process, he resorted to consulting his friends in Saudi Arabia for moral, dogmatic and financial support to promote a Wahabbist interpretation of Islam centering on the rejection of mysticism, return to puritanical Islamic teaching, and rejection of the then dominant Sufi brotherhoods. He also wanted to find mass support in his battle with the brotherhoods and what he felt was their hold on the political process. Gumi became more interested in ensuring political support for his ideas, based on his perception that a political Muslim has the power to change the course of lives of a larger number of people than publishing scholarly works or engaging in private debates and gradually became more interested in political means to achieve an Islamic reformist end. In the process, he became a supporter of women's rights to vote. By the early 1970s, he wished to contest what he felt was the hijacking of major Islamic political organizations by the Fityan al-Islam, an organization founded in Kano by Mudi Salga, a leader of the Salgawa network, who was opposed to some of the policies of the late Ahmadu Bello and his Jamaat Nasr al-Islam (the Association for the Support of Islam). He decided to start a movement and relied on his old students to spread his views on Islamic dogma, prodding many to take jobs at the JNI and enter into legislative duties. He used one of his students, Sheikh Ismaila Idris Ibn Zakariyya, as a founder for the new movement to challenge the Sufi brotherhoods and ensure a return of Islam to a fundamental way. The rise of this movement Izalatul Bidi'a Wa Ikamatul Sunnah or Movement for the Demolition of Bid'ah and Revival of the Sunnah, popularly called Izala, heralded the radicalization of Northern Nigeria.

Many within the political cycles and Sufi Brotherhoods of Northern Nigeria held that Gumi was the principal who drove a wedge between Muslims and non-Muslims in Northern Nigeria; that his interpretations of the Hadith and Qur'an were based on his own personal views and not the Sunnah; and that he was monopolizing the mass media for his personal views. He was also criticized for his rebellious views on traditional authorities.

Gumi believed that Nigerian Muslims should never accept a non-Muslim ruler, but he also advocated peaceful coexistence with non-Muslim groups.

== Awards and honors ==
He received the Commander of the Order of the Federal Republic. In 1987, he received the King Faisal International Prize from Saudi Arabia for his translation of the Quran into the Hausa language.

Abubakar Gumi who was referred to as the father of Izala as he usually mentioned during his Islamic teaching process, succeeded in overwhelming the establishment of the 1970s organisation by name Izalatul Bidi'ah wa Iqamatussunah co-founded by one of his prominent student whom Gumi tutor in his previous job as a school teacher at School of Arabic Studies (SAS) in Kano, though he also maintain his membership in Jama'atu Nasrul Islam (JNI) which favour him to proceed in his Islamic teachings at Kaduna central mosque handed by the above-mentioned organisation, JNI.

== See also ==
- Ahmad Abubakar Gumi
- Sheikh Muhammad Auwal Albani Zaria
- Sheikh, Dr. Ahmad Bamba
- Sheikh Ja'afar Mahmud Adam
- Prof. Isa Ali Pantami
- Sheikh, Dr. Idris Abdul'aziz Dutsen Tanshi
- Sheikh, Dr. Ahmad Abubakar Gumi
- Sheikh Abdullahi Bala Lau
- Sheikh, Dr. Kabiru Gombe
- Sheikh Sani Yahaya Jingir
- Sheikh, Dr. Aminu Ibrahim Daurawa
- Izala Society
