= Nigerian Supreme Council for Islamic Affairs =

Nigerian Islamic organization

- Abbreviation: NSCIA
- Founded: 1 January 1974 (52 years ago) in Kaduna, Kaduna State, Nigeria
- Type: Non-profit religious organization
- Headquarters: Abuja National Mosque, Abuja, Nigeria
- Location: Nigeria
- President General: Muhammadu Sa'ad Abubakar
- Website: nscia.com.ng/

The Nigeria Supreme Council for Islamic Affairs (NSCIA) was established in 1973 at a national conference of Nigerian Muslim leaders in Kaduna under the auspices of Jama'atu Nasril Islam (JNI), the group for all the Islamic organisations in Northern Nigeria. In the South-West, prior to this conference, the first Muslim organisation to be formed after independence in 1960 was the United Muslim Council (UMC), but this was embraced by few Muslims in the Western Zone as it was championed by the ruling political party. According to Adegbite, the emergence and coming together of the Western Joint Muslim Organisation (WESJOMO), the Najah Joint Muslim Organisation (NAJOMO) and the Nigerian Muslim Council (NMC) of Lagos State enabled the region to work hand-in-hand with the JNI to create in 1973 the Nigerian Supreme Council for Islamic Affairs.

The landmark convergence in Kaduna came as an answer to the call for an all-embracing central leadership that would serve as the unifier and bridge among different Muslim groups in the country, as stipulated in Article One of the NSCIA Charter: "Muslim Communities, Islamic organisations and individual Muslims are hereby constituted into a central body to be known and called the Nigerian Supreme Council of Islamic Affairs." It has also been described as a turning point for it, starting from then, enables Muslims all over the country to interact with the government in one voice on all matters of concern to Islam, an intractable challenge until the founding of the council. The council's mandate to serve as the apex leadership body for the Nigerian Muslim community was first undertaken by the first President-General, Sultan Siddiq Abubakar III of Sokoto, joined by the first Secretary-General, Ibrahim Dasuki, who later rose to sultan. The former Nigerian Minister of Works, Isa Kaita, was appointed National Treasurer while Lateef Adegbite, the chairman of the Constitution Drafting Committee and the Attorney-General and Commissioner of Justice of the Western Region of Nigeria, was made the first National Legal Adviser. He later became the Secretary-General in 1988.

== Leadership ==
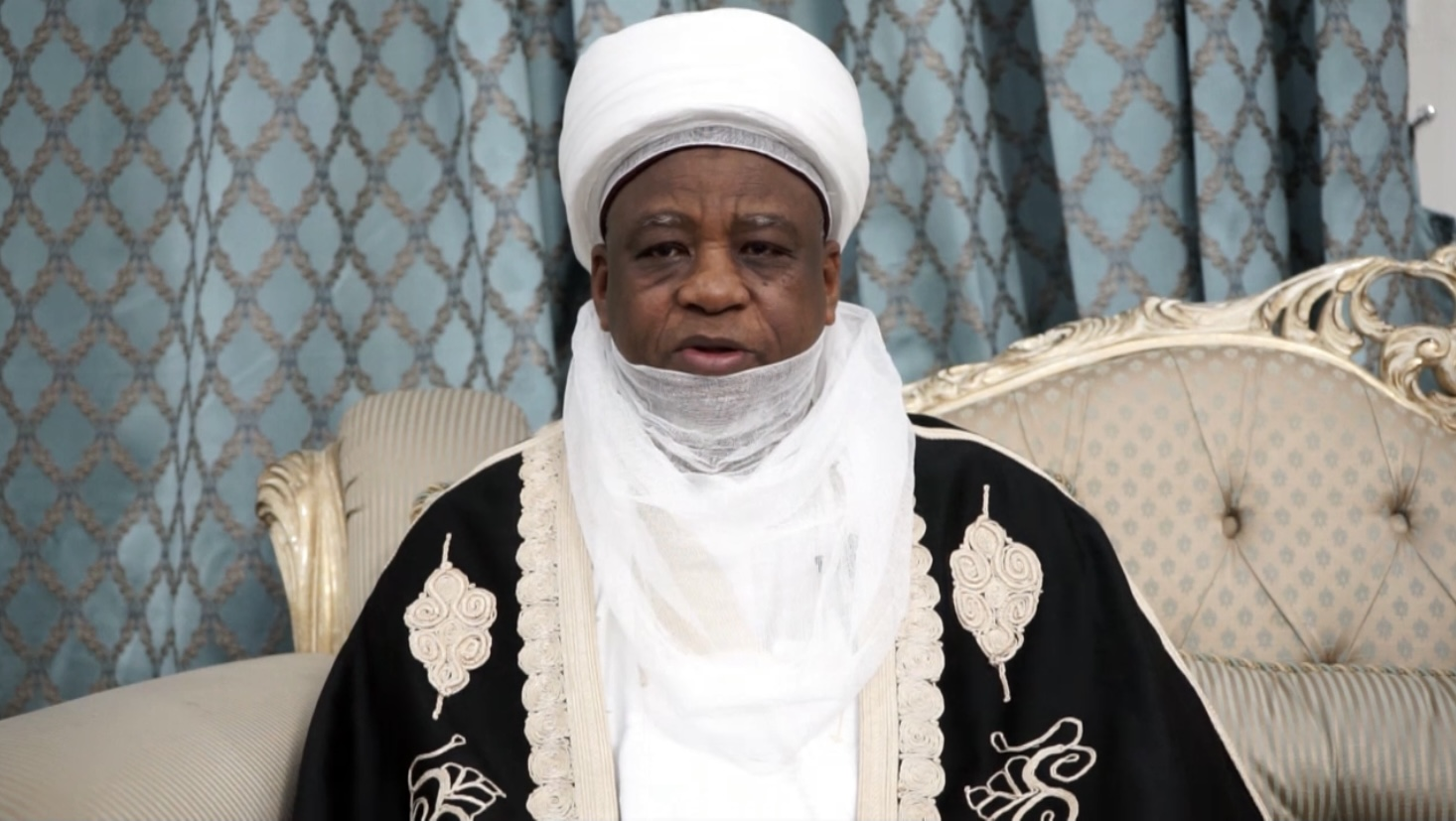
Muhammad Sa’ad Abubakar CFR, mni, the Sultan of Sokoto and NSCIA President-General

The leadership of the NSCIA includes the President-General, two Deputies President-General for the North and South (with the Shehu of Borno as the permanent Deputy President-General for the North), Secretary-General, Deputy Secretary-General (3), National Treasurer, National Legal Adviser, Deputy National Legal Adviser and Chairmen of the 36 states and FCT Councils of the NSCIA. The council is led by the Sultan of Sokoto, Muhammad Sa’ad Abubakar since 2006, with Is-haq O. Oloyede, former Vice Chancellor of the University of Ilorin and current Registrar and Chief Executive of Nigeria's Joint Admissions and Matriculation Board (JAMB), as the Secretary-General since May 2013. The Shehu of Borno Abubakar Ibn Umar Garba serves as the Deputy President General North, while Rasaki Oladejo serves as the Deputy President General South of the council.

== Structure ==
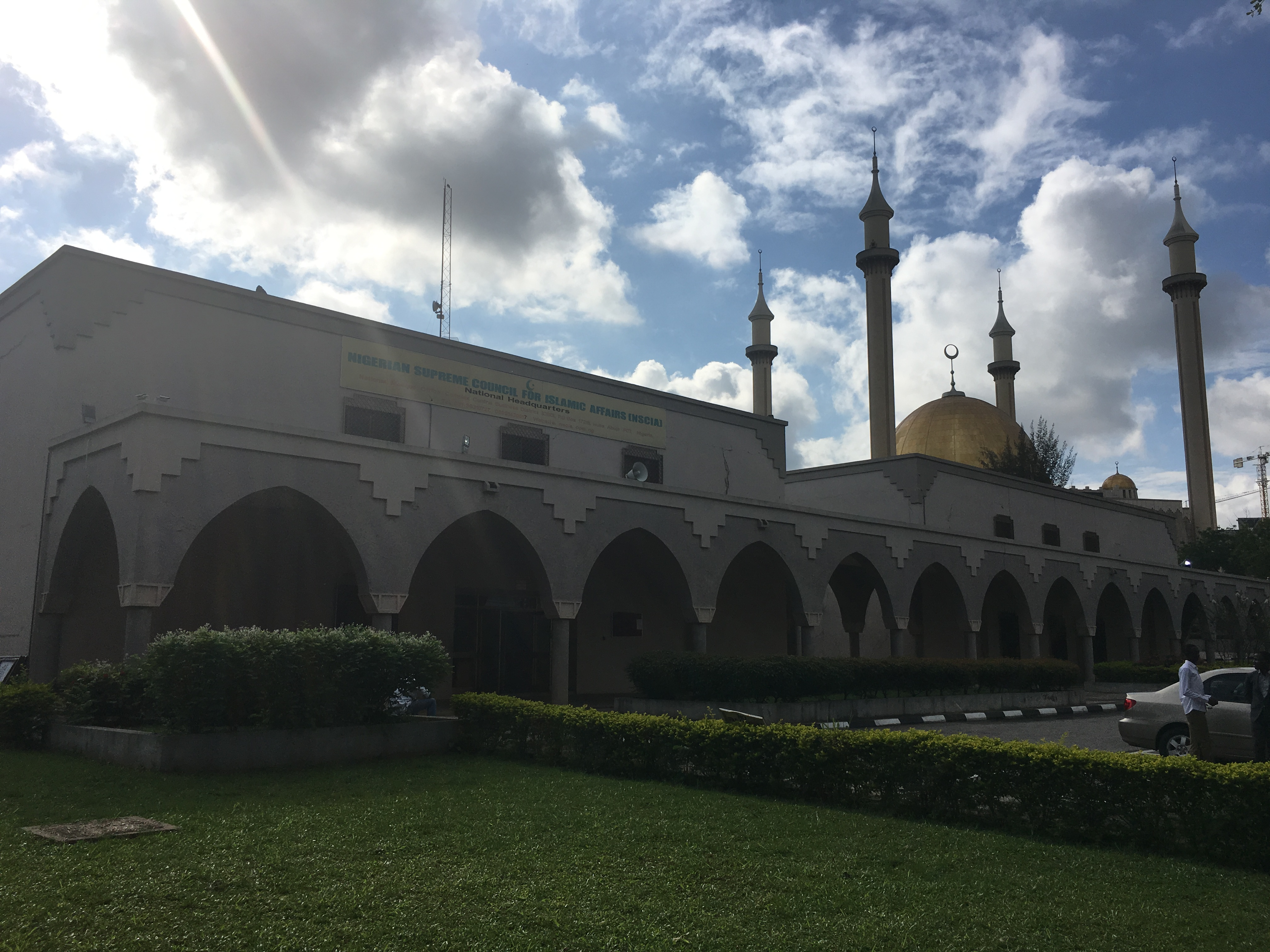
NSCIA Secretariat, Abuja

The Nigeria Supreme Council for Islamic Affairs system is based on five active organs: Legislative organ, the General Assembly, Executive organ, National Executive Council and the National Secretariat.

=== Legislative organ ===
The General Assembly is the supreme legislative organ of the council, and subject to the provisions of the Constitution, the General Assembly sitting in plenary session exercises final authority in all matters dealt with in the Constitution guiding the affairs of the council or affecting Islam and the Muslims in Nigeria generally.

=== General assembly ===
The membership of the General Assembly is stipulated in Article 6 of the NSCIA Constitution. The General Assembly consists of the President-General of the Council, National Officers of the council, and State Council Representatives selected by their respective State Councils in accordance with the provision of paragraph (2) of the Article. Such individuals are co-opted from time to time by the General Assembly itself for a stated period and on the basis of the status or individual contributions of such persons to the cause of Islam.

=== Executive organ ===
The NSCIA has a National Executive Council which is the executive organ to whom all Officers and Committees established by the council are primarily accountable in the discharge of their functions and in the exercise of their powers.

=== National Executive Council ===
The National Executive Council comprises:

- National Officers of the Council
- One member representing each State Council
- Co-opted members from the General Assembly not exceeding one-tenth of the total membership of the National Executive Council.

=== National Secretariat ===
The NSCIA's National Secretariat, headquartered in Abuja, is headed by the Secretary-General. It provides information, monthly moon-sighting reports, studies, and facilities needed by other organs for their effective operations. It also executes tasks as instructed by the Legislative Organ, the Sultan – the President-General – and other Council's bodies. The council also employs the services of a full-time Administrative Director-General who is hired on terms and conditions as the National Executive Council deems fit. The Director-General handles the day-to-day affairs of the Secretariat, coordinate the activities of the Zonal Directors and is responsible to the NEC through the Secretary-General.

== NSCIA and the quest for a multi-religious Nigeria ==
In 1975, when the Federal Government of Nigeria inaugurated the Constitution Drafting Committee, there was a hot debate on a proposed section of the constitution on the state and its fundamental objectives. Objecting to the suggestion that Nigeria be described as "One and indivisible sovereign Republic, secular, democratic and social," intellectuals and public opinion leaders began to debate the appropriateness or otherwise of the term "secular" for the Nigerian state. According to several sources, the NSCIA, standing on the argument that Nigeria is a multi-religious state, maintained that the country could not be a secular state in that the concept of secularism is ultimately rooted in the doctrine that morality should be based solely on regard to the well-being of mankind with exclusion of religious considerations. The NCIA argues that this is not the case of Nigeria—although not a theocratic state such as Saudi Arabia, nor a secular state like Turkey—is a multi-religious state by default. Not only does Nigeria recognises religions, the "Nigerian government also facilitates pilgrimages (to the holy lands), provides for the teaching of religious studies in schools, and declares public holidays for religious festivals." The Council added that "Nigerians have a work-free day on Sunday because Christians are required to worship on that day owing to the insistence of their religion that the day be work-free and that the government also recognises the Vatican and allows them to have an ambassador in Nigeria and in response, sent an ambassador to the state of Vatican." Relying on the foregoing arguments, the Council successfully objected to Nigeria being considered a secular state.

== Contributions and achievements ==
The Nigerian Supreme Council for Islamic Affairs (NSCIA) takes charge of some responsibilities in Nigeria from Islamic Affairs to promoting education and contributing to participatory governance and national development. Some of the contributions and achievements include:

=== Religious tolerance and peaceful co-existence ===
Despite the challenges of sectoral divisions, the NSCIA has become a leading voice for religious tolerance in Nigeria through active steps on improving peace and peaceful coexistence in the country. The President-General of the Council and the Sultan of Sokoto, Alhaji Muhammad Sa’d Abubakar, have been at the forefront of this campaign through several initiatives and appearances at local and high-level international panels such as the Wilson Centre, diplomatic organisations and the Sultan Foundation for Peace and Development (SFPD) among others. In terms of results, the NSCIA, for instance, prevailed over Muslims, especially those in the North, who were agitated with the burning of mosques in the South East and South South regions following the hijacking of the #EndSARS protests in Nigeria. That particular action quelled religious violence in the country.

Officials of the NSCIA have also participated at the Vienna Conference on Global Peace, Interfaith dialogue on religion and peace-making and several other peace-building platforms. Besides, one notable initiative in the regard of peaceful co-existence is the Nigeria Inter-Religious Council (NIREC), a voluntary association jointly established by the leadership of the NSCIA and the Christian Association of Nigeria (CAN) in 1999. Steered by the joint leadership of the major faiths, NIREC has continued to maintain the ties of religious tolerance and peaceful co-existence in the country.

=== Uniting Muslims ===
In Nigeria, the NSCIA is carrying out the Quranic injunction that Muslims the world over must be one and united regardless of their ethnic, racial and socio-linguistic differences.

=== Muslim financial inclusion in Nigeria ===
Nigerian Muslims are believed to have been marginalised in the country's financial sector and other growth-triggering financial interventions of the Central Bank due largely to the element of interest—forbidden in Islam—that is usually involved in the schemes. For Muslims, who constitute well over half of the country's population, the question of avoiding interest is non-negotiable. In the absence of non-interest finance, the result has been a high rate of financial exclusion of Muslims, over 60% in some Muslim-majority communities. This leads to worsening incidence of abject poverty. The implication is that without non-interest alternatives, the CBN can hardly attain its 80% financial inclusion earlier targeted for 2020 nor can any meaningful poverty alleviation and economic empowerment programme be actualised in the foreseeable future. This explains why the Council engaged the Central Bank on the creation of a non-interest version of all its intervention programmes. As eventually done, the development covers the Anchor Borrowers Programme (ABP), Agri-Business, Small and Medium Enterprises Investment Scheme (AGSMEIS), Creative Industry Financing Initiative, Micro, Small and Medium Enterprise Development Fund (MSMEDF), Real Sector Support Facility (RSSF) and Credit Support for the Healthcare Sector.

=== Moon sighting ===
As the highest Muslim body in Nigeria, the NSCIA takes the responsibility of announcing the commencement and termination of the annual Ramadan fast via sighting of the moon. In previous years this was not done in an orderly way, but became well-organised in 2014, with large numbers of Muslims in Nigeria commencing and ending Ramadan fasting and celebrating the Eid festivals in unison, as the NSCIA Moon-sighting Committee, led by Professor Usman El-Nafaty, gives moon-sighting updates every day of the year.

=== Supervision of Hajj operations ===
In supporting the National Hajj Commission established by the Federal Government to superintend the annual Hajj pilgrimage operation in the country, the NSCIA has been acting as an intermediary between the intending pilgrims, the National Hajj Commission and the Federal Government. The council offers many advisory aids to the commission, and advises the authority on how to achieve successful pilgrimage to Mecca on a yearly basis.

=== Mission for Education, Socials and Health ===
The NSCIA established a project entity called Mission for Education, Socials and Health (MESH), registered by the Corporate Affairs Commission (CAC) in April 2016 as part of its commitment to the social needs of Muslims and poverty alleviation among Nigerians. One of the popular projects of MESH is the partnership with the Future Assured Initiative of the First Lady Aisha Buhari, in 2020 to organise a national conference on Repositioning the Muslim Family for National Development at the Banquet Hall of the Presidential Villa, Abuja.
