= Islamic extremism in Northern Nigeria =

Islamic extremism is adherence to a fundamentalist interpretation of Islam (see Islamic fundamentalism), potentially including the promotion of violence to achieve political goals (see Jihadism). In contemporary times, Islamic extremism in Northern Nigeria is typified by the Boko Haram insurgency and the proselytizing campaigns of Salafist groups such as the Izala Society.

== History ==
The earliest documented instance of extremism in what is now Northern Nigeria was waged in the 14th century by the then Sultan of Kano Ali Yaji, it culminated in the Battle of Santolo and the subsequent transformation of the Habe-Hausa kingdoms of Northern Nigeria into Islamic sultanates. In the 19th century, the Fula people led by Usman dan Fodio overthrew many of these sultanates in another Jihad campaign and replaced them with the more puritanical Sokoto Caliphate. The slow rise of Islamic mysticism in the form of Sufi brotherhoods under the caliphate reversed some of the more puritanical tendencies of the early caliphate.

After the pacification of Northern Nigeria by the British, they preserved most of the native institutions of the Sokoto Caliphate including its emirates which were aligned with the Sufi orders. In the 1960s, the former Grand Qadi of Northern Nigeria, Abubakar Gumi and Sheikh Ismaila Idris with support of Wahabbist organisations from Saudi Arabia established the Jamatul Izalatul Bidia Wa Ikhamatul Sunnah.

Infused with further religious zeal from Gumi, offshoots of Izalatul Bidi'a Wa Ikamatul Sunnah like Boko Haram and Ansaru developed.

== Izala ==
Izala was the first Islamist organization in modern times to openly advocate for a militant transformation of Northern Nigerian institutions in line with fundamentalist interpretations of Islam. Officially founded in 1978 with funding from Saudi Arabia, it is split between the more Militant Ikhwanist-Qutbist view and the more political Maududist view. The Ikhwanists find inspiration from the teachings of the early Wahabist Ikhwan Movement and Sayyid Qutb, who justified the violent overthrow of systems deemed un-Islamic. In 2001, a faction of the Ikhwanist broke away to form Boko Haram. The Maududist faction found inspiration from the teachings of the movement's founder Abubakar Gumi and Abul A'la Maududi and advocated for a 'smart' political jihad that they believe will mitigate any loss of life on their part.

== Boko Haram ==
Jihadist group Boko Haram began their insurgency with an uprising in 2009. They have carried out many attacks since then, killing thousands of people. In the mid-2010s, their insurgency expanded into Cameroon, Chad, Mali, and Niger.
