= Eastern Air Lines Flight 663 =

1965 aviation accident in New York, US

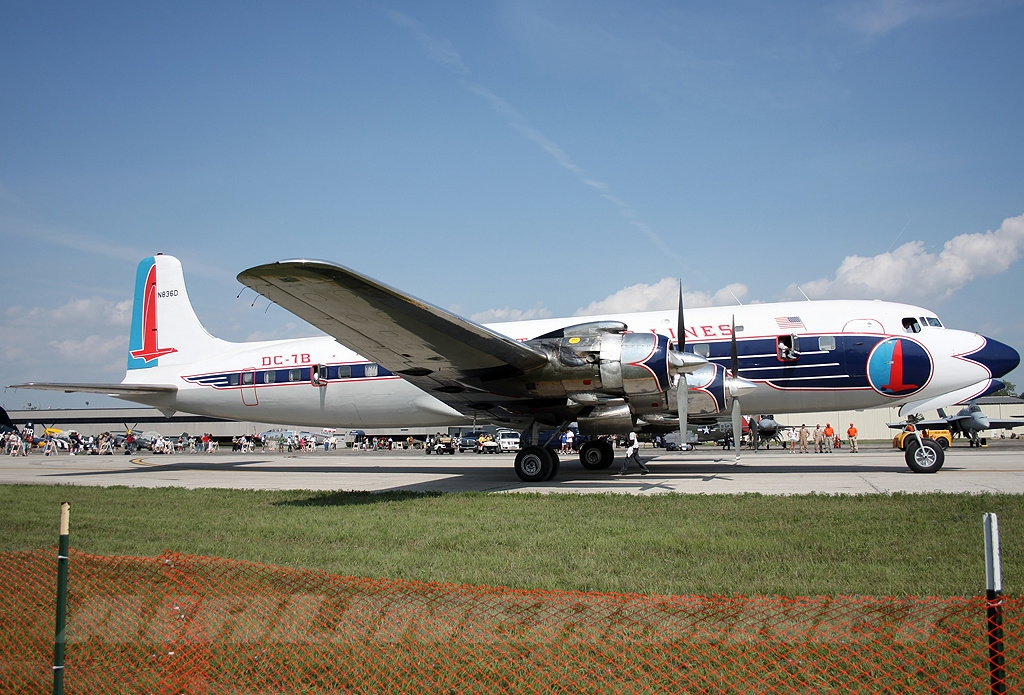
- An Eastern Air Lines Douglas DC-7B

Accident
- Date: February 8, 1965
- Summary: Spatial disorientation while evading a mid-air collision
- Site: 6.7 mi (10.8 km) SSW of Jones Beach State Park, New York, United States; 40°26′10″N 73°33′45″W

Aircraft
- Aircraft type: Douglas DC-7B
- Operator: Eastern Air Lines
- IATA flight No.: EA663
- ICAO flight No.: EAL663
- Call sign: EASTERN 663
- Registration: N849D
- Flight origin: Logan International Airport; Boston, Massachusetts, US
- 1st stopover: New York International Airport; New York City, US
- 2nd stopover: Byrd Field; Richmond, Virginia, US
- 3rd stopover: Charlotte/Douglas Int'l Airport; Charlotte, North Carolina, US
- 4th stopover: Greenville-Spartanburg Int'l Airport; Greenville, South Carolina, US
- Destination: Hartsfield–Jackson Atlanta Int'l Airport; Atlanta, Georgia, US
- Occupants: 84
- Passengers: 79
- Crew: 5
- Fatalities: 84
- Survivors: 0

Eastern Air Lines Flight 663 was an American domestic passenger flight from Boston, Massachusetts, to Atlanta, Georgia, with scheduled stopovers at John F. Kennedy International Airport, New York; Richmond, Virginia; Charlotte, North Carolina; and Greenville, South Carolina. On the night of February 8, 1965, the aircraft serving the flight, a Douglas DC-7, crashed near Jones Beach State Park, New York, just after taking off from JFK Airport. All 79 passengers and five crew aboard died.

The Civil Aeronautics Board (CAB) investigation determined that evasive maneuvers undertaken by Flight 663 to avoid an oncoming Pan Am Boeing 707 caused the pilot to suffer spatial disorientation and lose control of the aircraft. The accident is the third-worst accident involving a DC-7.

== Flight history ==
The Douglas DC-7 serving Flight 663 made its first flight in 1958 and subsequently accumulated a total of 18,500 hours of flight time. It was piloted by Captain Frederick R. Carson, 41, who had been employed by Eastern Air Lines for 19 years and who had accumulated 12,607 hours of flight time. His co-pilot, First Officer Edward R. Dunn, 41, a nine-year veteran of Eastern Airlines, had 8,550 hours of flight time. The flight engineer was Douglas C. Mitchell, 24, with two years' employment and 407 pilot hours, and 141 hours of flight engineer time. All had passed proficiency checks with the DC-7B aircraft.

The flight from Logan International Airport in Boston, Massachusetts, to John F. Kennedy International Airport, in New York, proceeded normally. Flight 663 departed JFK at 6:20 p.m. EST on an instrument flight rules (IFR) clearance to Byrd Field (now Richmond International Airport), in Richmond, Virginia. Take-off proceeded normally, and the airport control tower prepared to hand over control to the New York Air Route Traffic Control Center (ARTCC) on Long Island, noting that Flight 663 was executing a "Dutch seven departure", a routine takeoff procedure that required a series of turns over the Atlantic Ocean to avoid flying over New York City. The New York ARTCC responded with the information that Pan American World Airways (PA) Flight 212, a Boeing 707, was descending to 4,000 feet (1,200 m) in the same airspace.

Radio conversation between the New York Air Route Traffic Control Center and the JFK control tower
Sender	Message	Ref
New York Air Route Traffic Control Center	All right, at three miles north of Dutch is Clipper 212 descending to 4,000.	
New York Air Route Traffic Control Center	How does he shape up with that boy coming in ... the guy at his 1 o'clock position?	
JFK control tower	We're above him.	

Though the control tower responded that EA 663 was at a higher altitude than PA 212, it was, in fact, lower. Subsequently, the control tower radioed the Pan Am flight that there was traffic in his airspace at 11 o'clock, six miles away traveling southeast of Pan Am's position, climbing above 3,000 feet (910 m). Pan Am 212 acknowledged. Air traffic control then radioed Flight 663 a similar advisory: at 2 o'clock, five miles away traveling, below Flight 663's position. In reality, the traffic, Pan Am 212, was above Flight 663, descending from 5,000 feet (1,500 m). Captain Carson acknowledged that he saw the traffic, that he was beginning to turn into the Dutch seven departure, and signed off, saying, "good night".

Radio conversation between the JFK control tower, Pan Am Flight 212, and Eastern Flight 663 (highlighted)
Sender (bold) recipient	Message	Ref
JFK control tower to Pan Am 212	Traffic at 11 o'clock, six miles, southeastbound, just climbing out of three [thousand feet].	
Pan Am 212 to JFK control tower	We have traffic.	
JFK control tower to Eastern 663	Traffic, 2 o'clock, five miles, northeast-bound, below you.	
Eastern 663 to JFK control tower	Okay. We have the traffic. Turning one seven zero, six six three ... good night.	
JFK control tower to Eastern 663	Good night, sir.	

Flight 663's radioed "good night" at 6:25 p.m. was the last transmission received from the flight.

== Crash ==
The night of February 8 was dark, with no visible moon or stars and no visible horizon. As the two airliners approached similar positions, their pilots had no points of reference with which to determine the actual separation distance or position. Flight 663's departure turn, and Pan Am's subsequent turn left to its assigned heading, had placed the two aircraft on an apparent collision course. The Boeing rolled right and initiated a descent in an attempt to avoid a collision. In response, Eastern 663 began an extreme right turn to pass safely. The captain of Pan Am 212 later estimated that the two aircraft had passed between 200 and 500 feet (60 and 150 m) of each other, while the first officer estimated that the distance was only 200 to 300 feet (60 to 90 m).

Flight 663 could not recover from its unusually steep bank and plunged into the icy waters of the Atlantic Ocean, where it exploded with bright orange flames. The Pan American 707 was the first to relay news of the crash, as it was receiving permission to land. Air Canada Flight 627, which had departed a few minutes before Flight 663, also radioed news of an explosion in the water.

Radio conversation between the JFK control tower, Pan Am Flight 212, and Air Canada Flight 627
Sender (bold) recipient	Message	Ref
Pan Am 212 to JFK control tower	Uh ... OK. We had a near miss here. Uh ... we're turning now to ... Uh ... three six zero and ... Uh ... did you have another target in this area at the same spot where we were just a minute ago?	
JFK control tower to Pan Am 212	Uh ... affirmative, however, not on my scope at present time.	
Pan Am 212 to JFK control tower	Is he still on the scope?	
JFK control tower to Pan Am 212	No sir.	
Pan Am 212 to JFK control tower	It looked like he's in the bay then, because we saw him. He looked like he winged over to miss us and we tried to avoid him, and we saw a bright flash about one minute later. He was well over the top of us, and it looked like he went into an absolute vertical turn and kept rolling.	
Air Canada 627 to JFK control tower	There's a big fire going out on the water here about our 2 o'clock position right now. I don't know what it is. It looked like a big explosion.	

After the initial explosion, the wrecked aircraft sank to the bottom in 75 feet (23 m) of water. Numerous air crews, including Pan Am 212, Air Canada 627, and Braniff Airlines Flight 5, radioed ATC controllers in the area with news of an explosion. The aircraft broke up upon impact and was destroyed. All five crew members and 79 passengers died on impact.

== Aftermath and investigation ==
Fifteen ships, accompanied by eleven helicopters and numerous rescue divers, converged on the scene of the crash in hopes of rendering aid to survivors. Two hours after the impact, debris began floating up to the surface. By sunrise, seven bodies had been recovered; three more were discovered in the course of the following three days. In locating the wreckage, the United States Navy provided sonar to assist with the operation. Thirteen Coast Guard vessels helped search the shores of Long Island and provided salvage efforts. Rescue workers and volunteers scoured 40 miles (64 km) of beaches, collecting debris that washed ashore.

The Civil Aeronautics Board (CAB) investigated the accident. The DC-7 was not required to be equipped with a flight recorder, which would have automatically recorded the pilots' every control input. Thus, the CAB was forced to rely on witness testimony, radio recordings, and a best guess based on experience. Nevertheless, the CAB determined that the evasive maneuvers taken by the pilot of Flight 663 to avoid the oncoming Pan Am jet caused spatial disorientation. The disorientation, coupled with the extreme maneuver, made it impossible for the pilot to recover from the roll in the few seconds before the DC-7 crashed into the Atlantic Ocean. The CAB also determined that Captain Carson had neither the time nor adequate information to assess Flight 663's position relative to Pan Am 212 and, given the illusion of a collision course, he had acted appropriately in initiating evasive maneuvers. The CAB made no recommendations in the final accident report. Although early news reports reported the near miss of Flights 663 and 212, the FAA denied that there was ever any danger of a collision.

== See also ==
- Aviation safety
- ADC Airlines Flight 86
- Near miss (safety)
