= Lateef Adegbite =

Nigerian lawyer

DR Lateef Adegbite CON

Attorney General of Western Region
- President: Brigadier Oluwole Rotimi

Personal details
- Born: 20 March 1933
- Died: 28 September 2012 (aged 79)
- Citizenship: Nigeria
- Education: College of Law for Solicitors, Lancaster Gate

Lateef Adegbite (20 March 1933 – 28 September 2012) was a lawyer who became Attorney General of the Western Region of Nigeria, and who later became Secretary-General of the Nigerian Supreme Council for Islamic Affairs.

== Birth and education ==
Abdu-Lateef Oladimeji Adegbite was born on 20 March 1933 into a strictly Muslim Egba family in Abeokuta, Ogun State.

According to one account, he attended Methodist School, Abeokuta.

He says himself that he attended Arabic School, then entered St. Paul's Primary School in Igbore, Abeokuta in 1942, when he was aged nine.

Adegbite obtained a scholarship to attend King's College, Lagos, where he was co-founder and first National president of the Muslim Students Society of Nigeria, graduating in 1956.

In 1959 the Western Region Premier Chief Obafemi Awolowo awarded him a scholarship to travel to England to study for a law degree under a plan drafted by Chief F.R.A. Williams.

Adegbite attended the University of Southampton, graduating with a B.A. in law in July 1962.

He then studied at the College of Law for Solicitors, Lancaster Gate in London, and then at Gray's Inn (1963–1965).

Later he won a Commonwealth Scholarship for post-graduate studies in England.

He began his career teaching law at the University of Lagos, holding this position until retiring to go into private practice in September 1976.

== Later career ==
In 1971 Adegbite was appointed Commissioner for Local Governments and Chieftaincy Matters in the old Western Region of Nigeria during the military administration of Brigadier Christopher Oluwole Rotimi.

He was then appointed Commissioner for Justice and Attorney-General of the Western Region in 1973.

In October 1976 he founded the legal firm of Lateef Adegbite & Co as the Principal Partner, with main office in Lagos and a branch office in Abeokuta, specialising in Commercial and Corporate Law.

The Abeokuta office is in Ago-Oba. He was one of the founders of the Abeokuta Social Club in 1972.

Adegbite was president of the Nigeria Olympic Committee from 1972 to 1985.

He was Pro-Chancellor and Chairman of the Governing Council of the University of Maiduguri from 1984 to 1990.

He became a member of the executive committee of the Lagos State Chamber of Commerce and Industry.

He became a Director of Industrial and General Insurance Plc.

Adegbite was appointed a Commander of the Order of the Niger (CON).

He holds the traditional titles of Seriki of Egbaland and Baba Adinni of Egba Muslims.

On 9 March 2011 President Goodluck Jonathan appointed him Chairman of a Presidential Committee on Public Awareness on Security and Civic Responsibilities.

Dr Lateef Adegbite was a brother of the late famous, renowned historian Professor Saburi Biobaku (1918–2001), a former Vice-Chancellor of the University of Lagos.

== Muslim leader ==
At the constituent assembly in 1976, Adegbite argued in favour of introducing Islamic courts of appeal into the southern states of Nigeria, arguing that Muslims had the right to have their affairs judged according to Sharia law.

He has stated "Muslims have no other constitution and law apart from what Sharia had laid down. Sharia as a divine law supersedes all other civil and moral laws". He was to support efforts by M.K.O. Abiola to introduce Sharia to the southern states in the early 1990s.

He reasserted this position in December 2002 during a period of heightened tension between Christians and Muslims. Adegbite was chairman of the Ogun State Pilgrims Board and a member of the National Pilgrims Board. When Ibrahim Dasuki became Sultan of Sokoto in 1988 and President-General of the Nigeria Supreme Council for Islamic Affairs (NSCIA), Adegbite was appointed Secretary-General of the council. Under the leadership of Adegbite and Dasuki the NSCIA, which had been established in 1974, became much more active.

In late 2002 and early 2003, Adegbite was engaged in a public dispute with the Nobel Prize–winning author Wole Soyinka, who accused Muslim leaders of inciting violence after rioting in Kaduna had led to many people being killed. The origin was opposition by Muslims to staging the Miss World beauty contest in Nigeria.

The riots were triggered by what were taken to be blasphemous statements by a Christian newspaper reporter, Isioma Daniel, who wrote that if the Prophet had attended the event he might have picked one of the contestants as a wife.

Later the deputy governor of Zamfara State, Mamauda Aliyu Shinkafi, was reported to have said in a public speech that it might be lawful for a Muslim to shed the blood of Isioma Daniel. Adegbite immediately rejected this position, since the journalist was not Muslim and the newspaper had apologised publicly.

Adegbite stated in an October 2003 newspaper article that "the US and their allies should be persuaded to accept that the prevailing international terror would reduce considerably if justice is entrenched in the Middle East. Give the Palestinians back their land, there will no longer [be] platforms for the Osama bin Ladens of this world to thrive. Without justice there can be no peace".

When UNESCO arranged a conference on inter-religious dialogue in Abuja in December 2003, Adegbite was invited to speak on The role of religious leaders in conflict resolution.

== Death ==
Dr Adegbite died in Lagos on 28, September 2012.
