= ADC Airlines =

Nigerian airline

Aviation Development Company
IATA	ICAO	Call sign
Z7	ADK	ADCO
- Founded: 1984 (Suspended since 2007)
- Ceased operations: 2007
- Hubs: Lagos, Nigeria
- Focus cities: Abuja, Nigeria; Lagos, Nigeria; Sokoto, Nigeria; Yola, Nigeria; Calabar, Nigeria; Port Harcourt, Nigeria
- Frequent-flyer program: Unicorn Club
- Fleet size: 3 (October 2006)
- Destinations: 6 (February 2005)
- Headquarters: Ikeja, Lagos State, Nigeria
- Key people: Captain Babajide B. Alakija -Chairman; Captain Mfon E. Udom – MD/CEO,
- Website: adcairlines.com

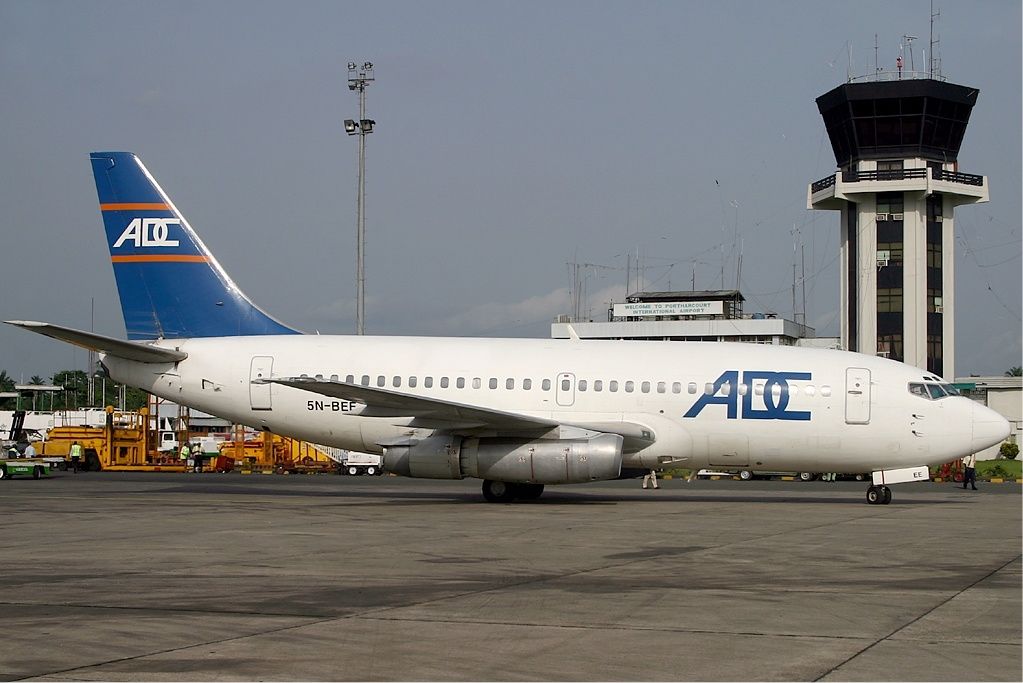
A Boeing 737-200 of ADC at Port Harcourt Airport

ADC Airlines was a Nigerian airline owned by Aviation Development Company plc and headquartered in Ikeja, Lagos State, Nigeria. It operated domestic scheduled services and regional charter flights. It had applied to be designated on international routes. Its main base was Murtala Mohammed International Airport, Lagos.

== History ==
Aviation Development Company plc opened in December 1984. In 1990 the company began to set up ADC Airlines, which became operations on 1 January 1991. In 1994 the airline was listed on the Nigerian Stock Exchange.

Originally it offered domestic services to Calabar, Port Harcourt, Lagos, Abuja and Kaduna and regional services to Monrovia in Liberia, Freetown in Sierra Leone, Conakry in Guinea, Banjul in Gambia and Accra in Ghana.

In 2000 it was decided to temporarily suspend ADC Airlines operations in order to re-capitalise the company. In February 2002 a Boeing 737-200 was acquired and operations restarted to Calabar. Since then three further Boeing 737s have joined the fleet. The airline is owned by the Aviation Development Company (ADC).

== Destinations ==
ADC airlines operated over 120 flights a week on the following services (at February 2005):

1. Abuja to Lagos, Sokoto and Yola
2. Calabar to Lagos and Port Harcourt
3. Lagos to Abuja, Calabar, Port Harcourt, Sokoto and Yola
4. Port Harcourt to Calabar and Lagos
5. Sokoto to Abuja and Lagos
6. Yola to Abuja and Lagos

All flights have been suspended since the crash of Flight 053.

== Accidents and incidents ==
The 1990s saw a number of accidents with ADC Airlines planes. In August 1994 and July 1995 two DC-9-31s were written off in non-fatal accidents, both at Monrovia-Spriggs Payne Airport.

=== Flight 086 ===
On 7 November 1996 a Boeing 727-231 Flight 086 en route from Port Harcourt crashed into the lagoon in Lagos 30 kilometres (19 mi) from Lagos airport while trying to avoid a collision with another aircraft flying out of Lagos airport. The fatal flight was flown by decorated former Nigeria Airways captain, Captain Dafe.

On 29 July 1997 a BAC One-Eleven 203AE landing at Calabar overshot the runway and an engine caught fire. There was one fatality.

=== Flight 053 ===
On 29 October 2006 a passenger plane, crashed near the Nigerian capital, Abuja. Local radio called on doctors to rush to the scene. One hundred and four people were on board the Boeing 737-200, which was traveling to Sokoto, and hospitals report seven survivors were found – six in a stable condition. The spiritual head of Nigerian Muslims, Sultan Maccido of Sokoto, died in the crash. His son, who is a senator, the deputy governor of Sokoto state and at least one other senator were also victims.

The airline was suspended by the Nigerian government until further notice.

== Fleet ==
The ADC Airlines fleet consisted of the following aircraft in October 2006:

- 3 Boeing 737-200

=== Previously operated ===
A variety of aircraft types have been operated in the past including: 1 Boeing 707-338C, 2 BAC One-Elevens, 3 Boeing 727s, 3 Douglas DC-9s, 1 Lockheed L-1011 TriStar and 1 ATR 42.
