= Badamasi Maccido =

Nigerian politician

Senator for Sokoto North
- In office May 2003 – October 2006
- Preceded by: Aliyu Abubakar
- Succeeded by: Ahmed Muhammad Maccido

Personal details
- Born: 1961 Sokoto State, Nigeria
- Died: 29 October 2006 (aged 44–45)
- Children: Mohammed, Fatima, Aisha, Abubakar and Umar

Badamasi Maccido (1961 – 29 October 2006) was elected federal Senator for the Sokoto North constituency of Sokoto State, Nigeria in April 2003 on the All Nigeria People's Party (ANPP) platform. He died in a plane crash in October 2006.

Maccido was born in 1961, son of the Sultan of Sokoto, Alhaji Muhammadu Maccido, and went to school at Federal Government College, Sokoto. He graduated from the Ahmadu Bello University, Zaria with a Bsc in Building Engineering. He once served as a Sokoto State commissioner in the administration of Governor Attahiru Bafarawa.

Maccido was elected Senator for Sokoto North, taking his seat in May 2003. In April 2005 the Independent Corrupt Practices and Other Related Offences Commission (ICPC) arraigned Maccido and others for involvement in an alleged N55 million budget bribe scam. Also charged were former Senate President Adolphus Wabara and former Education Minister Fabian Osuji. They were said to have demanded, received and shared N55 million to facilitate the passage of Education ministry's budget. After extended legal battles, on 1 June 2010 a full panel of the Court of Appeal in Abuja quashed all the charges, discharged and acquitted the accused. In Maccido's case, the acquittal was posthumous.

Maccido was killed in the crash of ADC Airlines Flight 53 with his father and his son, Umaru, on 29 October 2006. The plane, which was said to be in a poor state of maintenance, crashed in a storm shortly after take-off.
