= ADC Airlines Flight 086 =

1996 plane crash in Lagos, Nigeria

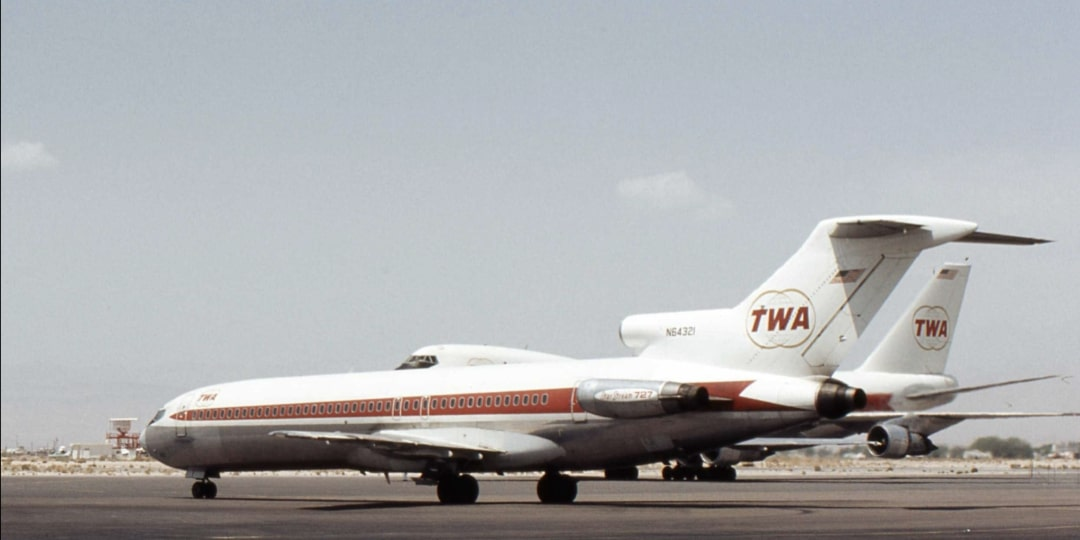
- The aircraft involved in the accident, photographed in 1972, while still in service with Trans World Airlines

Accident
- Date: 7 November 1996
- Summary: Crashed following loss of control after evasive maneuver
- Site: Lagos Lagoon, Epe, Lagos State; 06°37′08″N 03°49′33″E

Aircraft
- Aircraft type: Boeing 727-231
- Operator: ADC Airlines
- IATA flight No.: Z7086
- ICAO flight No.: ADK086
- Call sign: ADCO 86
- Registration: 5N-BBG
- Flight origin: Port Harcourt Airport, Port Harcourt, Nigeria
- Destination: Lagos Airport, Lagos, Nigeria
- Occupants: 144
- Passengers: 134
- Crew: 10
- Fatalities: 144
- Survivors: 0

ADC Airlines Flight 086 (ADK086) was a Nigerian domestic flight operated by ADC Airlines from Port Harcourt to Lagos. On the afternoon of 7 November 1996, the crew of the Boeing 727-231 operating the flight lost control of the aircraft while avoiding a mid-air collision on approach; the aircraft crashed inverted at a very high speed into a lagoon, killing all 144 passengers and crew on board. The crash remains as the fourth deadliest plane crash in Nigerian history after Dana Air Flight 0992, the 1992 Nigerian Air Force C-130 crash, and the 1973 Kano Nigeria Airways Boeing 707 crash.

Investigators determined that the primary cause of the accident was due to air traffic control error, the pilot's decision to continue his turn to a certain heading and his erroneous maneuver in evading from an incoming traffic, which ultimately led to the loss of control of the aircraft.

== Aircraft ==
Flight 086 was operated by a 27-year-old Boeing 727-231 with a registration of 5N-BBG and a manufacturer serial number of 20054. It was built in 1969 and was previously owned by Trans World Airlines with a registration of N64321 before it was acquired by ADC Airlines in 1995. The aircraft was found to be airworthy for flight as it was maintained with good maintenance.

== Passengers and crews ==
The aircraft was carrying 134 passengers and ten crew members. The nationalities of those on board were not disclosed. However, according to Associated Press, there were multiple foreign workers on board the flight. Foreign Office of the British Government confirmed the presence of at least six Britons aboard Flight 86. Employee of ADC Airlines reported that an American and the son of a French general were also on board. As Port Harcourt was known for its oil-production in the country, the route was often used by foreign oil executives.

Among the passengers was Nigerian political scientist Professor Claude Ake.

The flight crews were consisted of Captain Dafieko Emmy Sama, Captain Babajide Afolabi Afonja, Captain Lawrence Usen and Flight Engineer Bashiru Adegonke Folorunsho. Captain Usen was on the final part of his training and was the pilot who was in control of the aircraft for the majority of the flight.

== Accident ==
Flight 086 was a scheduled domestic passenger flight from Port Harcourt, the fifth-largest city in Nigeria, to Lagos, the largest city in the country. Operated by then-major airline ADC Airlines, the flight was operated with a Boeing 727-231, carrying 134 passengers and 10 crew members. The aircraft was flown by Captain Usen, who was on the final part of his training. The pilot in command, Captain Sama, was in charge for the radio exchange.

At 16:52 WAT (UTC +1), the aircraft took off from Port Harcourt and climbed to 24,000 feet (7,300 m). The flight was uneventful until the approach to Lagos.

As the flight was approaching Lagos, the crews intended to descend to 16,000 feet (4,900 m). However, an aircraft with callsign 5N-MPN had crossed Flight 086 at an altitude of 23,000 feet (7,000 m). Since Flight 086 was at 24,000 feet (7,300 m), they had to delay their descent. When 5N-MPN had completely crossed Flight 086, the ATC cleared the Flight 086 to descend to 16,000 feet (4,900 m). The flight crews then put the aircraft in a high rate of descent. During its descent to 16,000 feet (4,900 m), the ATC at Lagos then asked the crew to fly at a heading of 320 and to maintain the flight at FL50. At the same time another 727 operated by Triax was on its way from Lagos to Enugu at FL160. The Lagos Air Traffic Controller erroneously thought that he had earlier cleared Flight 086 to descend to 10,000 feet (3,000 m) and that it was below the Triax aircraft. As such, the controller immediately asked Flight 086 to redirect its heading to 300.

Flight 086 was descending to 16,000 feet (4,900 m) while Triax Flight 185 was climbing through 15,000 feet (4,600 m). This put both aircraft on a collision course. The traffic collision avoidance system (TCAS) of Flight 086 then sounded an alert, warning the flight crews to reduce its descent and start climbing in order to prevent a collision with Flight 185. At this stage, the flight crew had noticed the incoming Triax Flight 185.

CVR Fragment

17.02.41 ATC ADKO 086, what is your actual heading now?

17.02.46 CAM-1 We are heading eh, 3 - - - 15, turning 320

17.02.51 ATC Maintain heading 300, maintain heading 300

17.02.56 CAM-1 Ah, we - - - - -

17.02.57 TCAS Traffic, Traffic

As the TCAS sounded the alert, Captain Sama immediately took over the control from Captain Usen. He decided to disobey the controller's order of heading 300 and turned Flight 086 further to the right towards heading 330. The controller noticed this and encouraged the crews by stating "That's better!". Captain Sama turned the aircraft to the right with a bank angle of 44 degrees.

This however was not maintained. After 10 seconds, the bank angle started to increase, reaching 65.6 and 68,8 degree for 5 seconds. It kept increasing until it had reached a bank angle of 83 degree. It had entered an accelerated stall condition, which was caused by the large bank angle of the aircraft. The aircraft rapidly lost its altitude and nosedived in an inverted condition. The vertical acceleration reached 8.44 G.

17.03.20 CAM [Sound of high speed klacker]

17.03.25 CAM [Sound of horn]

17.03.32 CAM [Sound of screaming]

17.03.40 CAM [Sound of knocking]

End of recording

The flight crew of Flight 086 tried to save the aircraft from crashing. The aircraft appeared to be recovering as the vertical acceleration was reduced to 2.10 G when it crashed into Lagos Lagoon in inverted condition, at a speed of more than 490 knots (560 mph; 910 km/h), killing all 144 people on board.

== Investigation ==
Initially, there were widespread fear of sabotage as one of the victims was Professor Claude Ake, a prominent critic of Sani Abacha, the then-military junta leader in Nigeria. The investigation later concluded that there were no signs of sabotage in the crash of Flight 086.

The primary cause of the accident was determined to be error on part of the air traffic controller, quote "The untidy traffic separation by the radar controller which resulted from the vectoring of ADK086 towards the track of the opposite traffic TIX 185." The pilot was also found to be at fault for proceeding on a heading of 330 and the risky maneuver to avoid a collision with the Triax plane.

== Memorial ==
A cenotaph was erected at the riverside of Itoikin River in Ejirin to commemorate the victims of Flight 086. It was unveiled in November 1997 by then-Minister of Aviation Ita Udo-Ime. The memorial site, however, was left overgrown with weeds. The last renovation was conducted in 2010 and no government official has ever visited the site since then.

On 7 November 2021, 25 years after the crash, a memorial event was held in Ejirin by families and friends of the victims and former employees of ADC Airlines.

== See also ==
- Eastern Air Lines Flight 663
- Air Caribbean Flight 309
