= Imams in Ibadan =

The history of Islam in the ancient city of Ibadan can be traced to as far back as the early 19th century. It has been reported by various scholars that as at 1830 the city was full of Muslims from Yoruba, Hausa and many other tribes and varying origins. Islamic activities thus sprang up at this initial stage, though in its low ebb. Mosques were later built individually and collectively and Islamic scholars, who later became prominent Imam also migrated to the city. The actual time for the beginning of Islam have not been ascertained by the historian. However, as at 1839 mosque was found in the central Ibadan with its first Imam Shaykh Abdullah Igun Olohun.

== The Imam position in Ibadan ==
Imam literally means a Leader. He is the spiritual leader of the Muslims who mostly lead them in prayer (Salah) and performs some other functions as sermonising them (most especially on Fridays). There are rules guiding the selection of Imams in Islam. These rules vary from one school of thought to another and are sometimes influenced by tribal and geographical factors. In the modern time, Ibadan people adopt a unique system of selecting their Imams in consonance with the situation of things in the city and the Islamic teaching of Imamship. There are two routes through which Imams are chosen on a rotational basis to the position of Imams in Ibadan namely: the Mogaji (The Heirs) and Alfa (Scholar) Lines. The first line comprises those who succeeds ancestors who have either been an Imam or contributed immensely to the development of Islamic scholarship of the city and who are close to the position before their death. Meanwhile, the second line consist of the Islamic scholars whose their roots in Ibadan have been useful in the passing judgement on Islamic matters and are still useful in sermonising and educating people on Islamic matters. The Mufassir al-‘Am (Chief Interpreter of the Qur’an) and Mufti (Chief Judge) use to come from this side of the two lines. Although, those who are in the Mogaji line are not also found wanting in discharging the duties of Islamic sermons and giving Fatwa, the Alfa line is expected to be in the front when it comes to finding solution to the Islamic issues affecting Muslims in the city.

== The Ibadan Imam-in-Council ==
The administrative Structure of Ibadan Imams are divided into two namely: The Imam-in-Council and the General Assembly. The Imam-in-Council is an Eleven-Man committee, which is the supreme and the highest in the rank of the decision in the Central Mosque of Ibadanland. The composition of the council include top Five members from the Mogaji and Alfa Line together with the Chief Imam of Ibadan land who is the head of the council and the paramount leader of all Imams in the city. The highest in rank in the Mogaji line is known as Mogaji Agba (Chief Heir) while that of the Alfa line is Alfa Agba (Chief Scholar) who also double as the Grand Mufti and Chief Mufassir of the city. Both Mogaji and Alfa Agba are the heirs apparent, on rotational basis, to the throne of Chief Imam of the city whenever the position is vacant.

=== The Current Imam-in-Council of Ibadan land ===
Sheikh Alhaj Imam Abdul-Ganiyy Abubakr Agbotomokekere (Chief Imam of Ibadanland)

Mogaji Line

- Sheikh Alhaj Shittu Alagunfon (Mogaji Agba)
- Sheikh Alhaj Zakariyau Badmus Ona’do (Ajanasi Agba)
- Sheikh Alhaj Dr. Abdul-Waheed Ahmad al-Rufa’i
- Sheikh Alhaj Abdul-Majeed Abata
- Sheikh Alhaj Nurudeen Basunu

Alfa Line

- Sheikh Alhaj Abdul Fatai Alaga (Alfa Agba, Mufti, & Mufassir)
- Shaykh Alhaj Isa Hussayn Odo Elegun
- Shaykh Alhaj Dr. Barihi Adetunji
- Shaykh Alhaj Aninaloju
- Shaykh Alhaj Matanmi

== List of Ibadan Chief Imams ==
SN NAMES AREA/COMPOUND IN IBADAN DATES

1. Imam Abdullah Igun Olohun Ayeye ... - 1839
2. Imam Uthman AbuBakr Basunu I Ita-Okoro 1839 - 1871
3. Imam Ahmad Qifu I Isale-Alfa 1871 - 1872
4. Imam Haruna I Agbeni 1872 - 1884
5. Imam Sulaiman Alagunfon Agbeni 1884 - 1886
6. Imam Ibrahim Gambari Oja'gbo 1886 - 1896
7. Imam Abdullah Uthman Basunu II Ita-Okoro 1896 - 1911
8. Imam Muhammadul-Awwal Ahmad Qifu II Isale-Alfa 1911 - 1922
9. Imam Haruna Matanmi Oke-Gege 1922 - 1935
10. Imam Ali Muhammad Afasegbejo Haruna II Agbeni 1935 - 1940
11. Imam Muhammad Bello Yusuf Inakoju I Oke-Oja 1940
12. Imam Muhalli Abdullah Basunu III Ita-Okoro 1940 - 1982
13. Imam Muhammad Sadiq Ali Folorunso Popoyemoja 1983 - 1988
14. Imam Mudaththir Abdul-Salam Isale-Osun 1988 - 1991
15. Imam Muhammadul-Hadi Bello Inakoju II Oke-Oja 1991 - 1993
16. Imam Abdul-Karim Ahmad al-Rifa'i Oke-Are 1993 - 1995
17. Imam Busari Shu'ara' Haruna III Agbeni 1995 - 2015
18. Imam Abdul-Ganiyy AbuBakr Agbotomokekere (Gatta) Oke-Koto 2015

till present
