= Nigeria Rugby Football Federation =

Rugby union governing body in Nigeria

- Formation: May 6, 1998; 28 years ago
- Headquarters: Abuja, Nigeria
- Official language: English
- President: Ademola Are
- Key people: Abubakar Aliyu, Grace Iyorhe,
- Website: www.nigeria.rugby

The Nigeria Rugby Football Federation (NRFF) is the governing body for rugby union in Nigeria. It is affiliated to the Nigeria Olympic Committee, Rugby Africa and World Rugby.

The NRFF is constituted with a democratic board headed by President; Ademola Are and Vice President; AIG Aliyu Abubakar (Rtd) who have been elected to run the affairs of rugby in Nigeria.
