= Jama'atu Nasril Islam =

Nigerian Muslim organization

- Abbreviation: JNI
- Formation: 1962
- Founded at: Kaduna
- Headquarters: Kaduna
- Location: Nigeria
- Official language: English, Arabic
- Secretary General: Khalid Abubakar Aliyu
- Leader: Sultan Sa'adu Abubakar
- Parent organization: Nigerian Supreme Council for Islamic Affairs (NSCIA)

Jama'atu Nasril Islam (JNI; English: "Society for the Support of Islam") is an umbrella group for the Nigerian Muslim community its headquarter is in the city of Kaduna, and its president is the Sultan of Sokoto. The organisation conducts Islamic education and missionary work in Nigeria. The organisation was founded in 1962.

== Organization ==
Jama'atu Nasril Islam is the umbrella all Islamic organizations in Nigeria rally around. Its name, which in English is "Society for the Support of Islam", signifies why the society was first conceptualized and formed; basically to work, through peaceful ways, including 'wisdom and good preaching' in projecting the good image of Islam and defending the legitimate rights and interest of Muslims throughout Nigeria. The idea for the formation of JNI came up in 1962 after the return of the then Premier of Northern Nigeria, Alhaji (Sir) Ahmadu Bello (Sardauna of Sokoto) from pilgrimage in Makkah. The Sardauna, who, after making contact with Muslims from other parts of the world and having contemplated for some time on the need to have some organized efforts to propagate the teachings of Islam in Nigeria, decided to form an organization through which that goal can be achieved. Sardauna had discussed extensively on the matter with Sheikh Abubakar Mahmud Gummi, a renowned Islamic Scholar and the then Acting Grand Khadi of Northern Nigeria.
