= Siddiq Abubakar III =

Sultan of Sokoto from 1938 to 1988

- Sarkin Musulmi
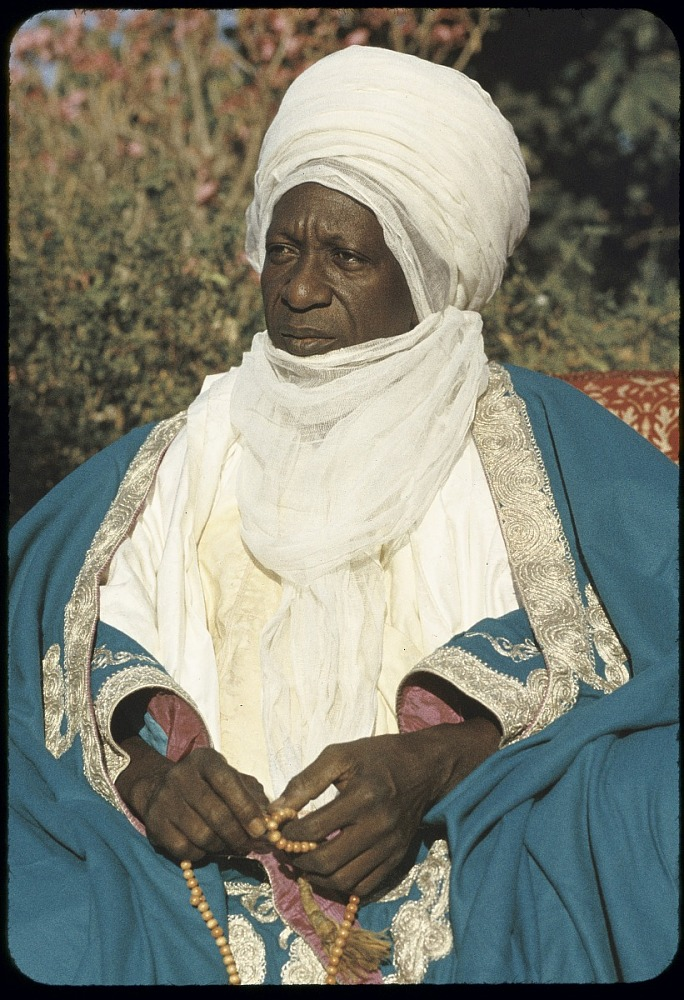
- Portrait by Eliot Elisofon, 1959

Sultan of Sokoto
- Reign: 17 June 1938 – 1 November 1988 (50 years, 4 months and 15 days)
- Predecessor: Hassan Dan Mu’azu Ahmad
- Successor: Ibrahim Dasuki
- Born: 15 March 1903; Dange, Sokoto State, Nigeria
- Died: 1 November 1988 (aged 85); Sokoto, Sokoto State, Nigeria
- Religion: Sunni Islam

Sir Siddiq Abubakar III, GCON, KBE (15 March 1903 – 1 November 1988) was a Nigerian Muslim leader (Sarkin Musulmi). He was the 17th Sultan of Sokoto between 17 June 1938 and 1 November 1988, making him the longest-reigning Sultan.

== Life and career ==
Siddiq Abubakar III was born in Dange on 15 March 1903. Dan Mu’azu, a son of Usman Shehu, was a grandson of Mu'azu and, through him, a direct descendant of Shehu Usman Dan Fodio (1754–1817). Abubakar was the fourth-generation heir to a two-century-old throne founded by the Shehu, the leader of the Maliki school of Islam and the Qadiri branch of Sunni.

Abubakar had an Islamic education. and served as a district scribe in Dange between 1929 and 1931. In February 1931 Abubakar succeeded his uncle, Hassan Ibn Muazu, as the local authority councillor (Head of Talata Mafara) of the Sokoto Native Authority. He rapidly distinguished himself through administrative competence, skilled management of appeals from traditional courts, and his effective supervision of district and village heads, and as a result served until 1938. As a councillor he worked in Sokoto, taking part in the decision-making process of the Sokoto Native Authority and supervising the prisons and police departments. His profile rose in Sokoto as his position made him accessible to the people, but it also led to tensions with Sultan Hasan dan Mu’azu Ahmadu. When Abubakar contested the throne with other princes, such as Ahmadu Bello and Ahmadu Isa of Gobir, the favourable impressions that Sokoto residents had towards him contributed to making his ascension possible. The British were also interested in appointing a leader who had the trust of the people within the political structure of Indirect rule, so they suggested the name of Abubakar to the kingmakers. On 17 June 1938, he was crowned as the 17th Sultan (Sarkin Musulmi) of the Sokoto Caliphate.

Abubakar was appointed a Knight Commander of the Order of the British Empire (KBE) by British King George VI during the Colonial Nigerian period in 1944, and after Nigeria attained independence in 1960, he was made a Grand Commander of the Order of the Niger (GCON) by the Federal Republic of Nigeria in 1964.

Sir Abubakar was appointed to the post of Minister Without Portfolio for the Northern Regional Government in 1951, providing moral support for the new administration of regional premier Sir Ahmadu Bello and assistance with mobilizing the Northern people for the independence movement. He then continued to play a significant role in reducing tensions in the region after the coup and assassination of Premier Sir Ahmadu Bello, Sardauna of Sokoto, on 15 January 1966.

On 18 July 1974, President Moktar Ould Daddah, who was on a state visit to Nigeria, paid a visit to Sultan Sir Abubakar, a fellow Islamic scholar, and friend in the company of General Yakubu Gowon.

In 1984, when another Sokoto son, Shehu Shagari, was removed from power, Abubakar preached peace within the emirate council and in its relationship with the new administration.

== Legacy ==
Sultan Abubakar left behind 52 children, including Maccido dan Abubakar, who succeeded Sultan Ibrahim Dasuki in 1996 to become the 19th Sultan of Sokoto.
