= Sosoliso Airlines Flight 1145 =

2005 aviation accident

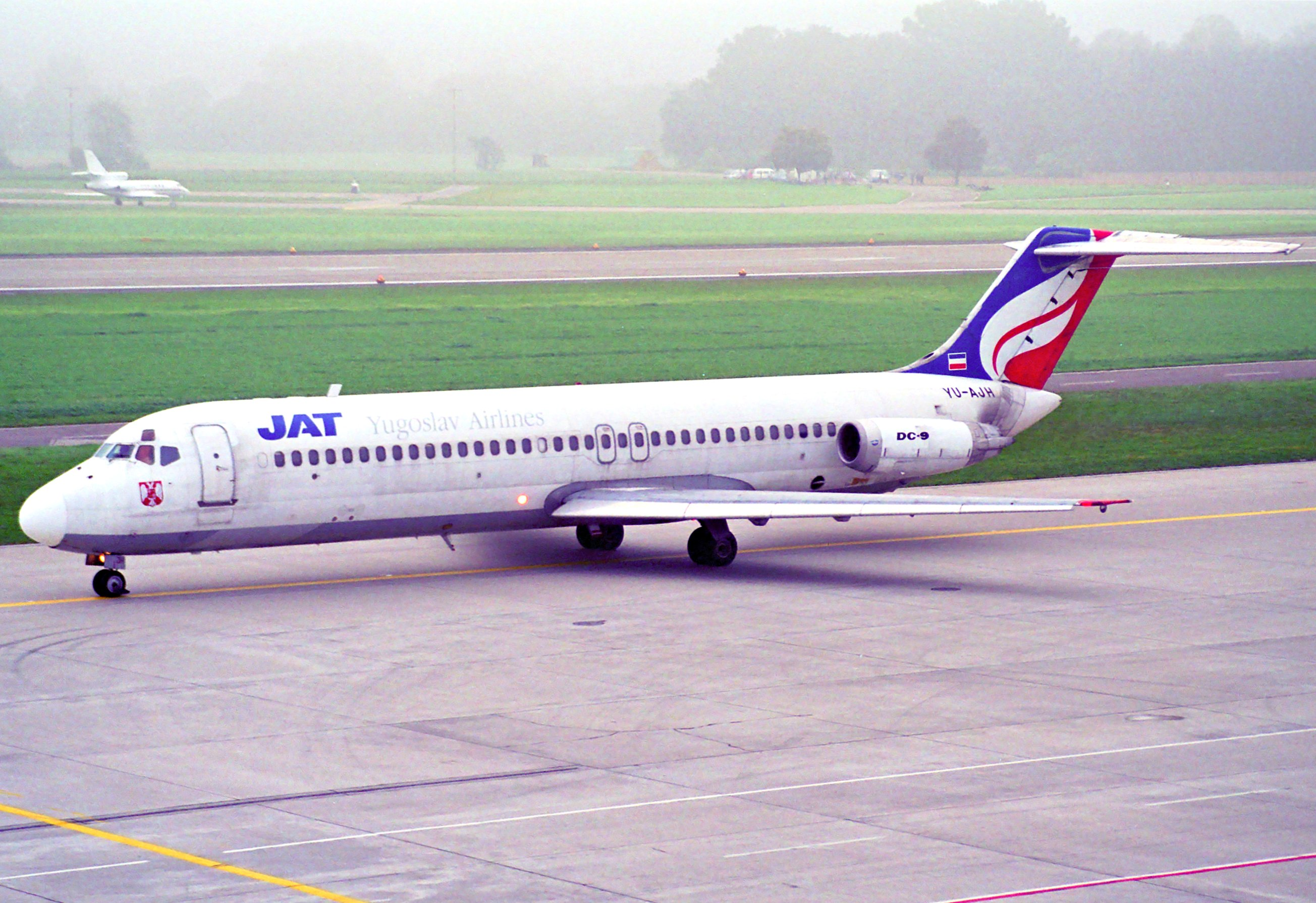
- The aircraft involved in the accident in 1997, while still in operation with JAT Airways

Accident
- Date: 10 December 2005
- Summary: Missed approach due to pilot error aggravated by microburst-induced windshear
- Site: Port Harcourt International Airport, Port Harcourt, Nigeria; 05°00′52″N 006°57′01″E

Aircraft
- Aircraft type: McDonnell Douglas DC-9-32
- Aircraft name: Rose of Enugu
- Operator: Sosoliso Airlines
- IATA flight No.: SO1145
- ICAO flight No.: OSL1145
- Call sign: SOSOLISO 1145
- Registration: 5N-BFD
- Flight origin: Nnamdi Azikiwe International Airport, Abuja, Nigeria
- Destination: Port Harcourt International Airport, Port Harcourt, Nigeria
- Occupants: 110
- Passengers: 103
- Crew: 7
- Fatalities: 108
- Injuries: 2
- Survivors: 2

Sosoliso Airlines Flight 1145 (SO1145/OSL1145) was a scheduled Nigerian domestic passenger flight from Nigeria's capital of Abuja (ABV) to Port Harcourt (PHC). At approximately 14:08 local time (13:08 UTC) on 10 December 2005, it crash-landed at Port Harcourt International Airport. The aircraft, a McDonnell Douglas DC-9-32 with 110 people on board, slammed into the ground and burst into flames. Immediately after the crash, seven survivors were recovered and taken to hospitals, but only two people survived.

It was the second air disaster to occur in Nigeria in less than three months, after Bellview Airlines Flight 210, which crashed on 22 October 2005 for reasons unknown, killing all 117 people on board. It was the company's first and only fatal accident.

An investigation carried out by Nigeria's Accident Investigation Bureau attributed the crash to the pilots' decision to keep descending past the minimum decision altitude even though they did not have the runway in sight. Contributing factors include the crew's delayed decision to execute a go-around, improper procedure being followed when it was executed, adverse weather conditions caused by microburst-induced windshear and thunderstorms, and the absence of runway lighting.

== Aircraft ==
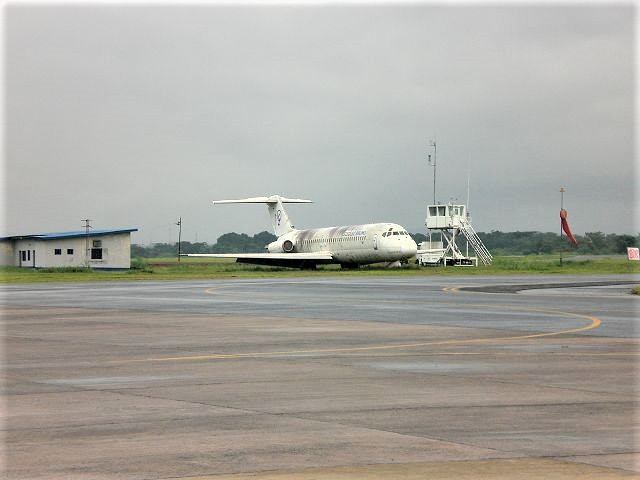
5N-BFD would have had a livery as seen on this similar aircraft of Sosoliso Airlines at Enugu Airport

The McDonnell Douglas DC-9 operating the flight was manufactured in 1972, with two Pratt & Whitney JT8D-9A engines. It became registered in Nigeria on 12 June 2003. The aircraft was owned by JAT Airways, and operated by Sosoliso Airlines Ltd. The aircraft certificate was released on 17 March 2005 and would have been due to another check on 27 June 2006. The aircraft was described as airworthy at the time of the accident.

== Passengers and crews ==
Flight 1145 was carrying 103 passengers and 7 crew members. The majority of those on board were children aged between 12 - 16 years old who were travelling home for Christmas holiday. Among the passengers were about sixty secondary school students from Loyola Jesuit College in the Federal Capital Territory region of Nigeria. At first, Loyola Jesuit College students from Port Harcourt traveled between school and their homes via buses using the roads. Rising crime along roads during the 1990s, however, made parents believe that road travel was too dangerous. In 2001, when Sosoliso Airlines began services between Port Harcourt and Abuja, parents placed their children on the flights.

Also on the flight were two volunteers for Medecins Sans Frontieres/Doctors Without Borders, one of whom was an American and the other was a French citizen, en route to work in Port Harcourt, as well as televangelist Bimbo Odukoya, pastor of the Fountain of Life Church. The National President of the Petroleum and Natural Gas Senior Staff Association of Nigeria (PENGASSAN), Uche Marcus Okoro who was returning from a union meeting, was also on the passenger list.

The captain was Benjamin Adebayo, a 48-year-old Nigerian with a total flying experience of 10,050 hours with 1,900 of them on the DC-9. He had his last simulator training at Pan Am International Flight Academy in Miami on 7 July 2005. The first officer was Gerald Andan, a 33-year-old Ghanaian with a total flying experience of 920 hours which 670 hours were on the type. He had his last simulator training in August 2005 with a result of 'satisfying'. The flight was supposed to be his last, after doubting the safety of the airline.

== Accident ==
Flight 1145 was a scheduled domestic passenger flight from Nigeria's capital Abuja to Port Harcourt, the capital of Rivers State. The aircraft departed from Nnamdi Azikiwe International Airport at 12:25 p.m with 103 passengers and 7 crew members, with Captain Adebayo (48) as the pilot who was in control of the aircraft and First Officer Andan (33) as his co-pilot. The flight was uneventful until its final approach in Port Harcourt.

About 140 kilometres (90 mi) from the airport, the aircraft contacted controller for initial descent clearance and was cleared by controller to descent to 4,900 metres (16,000 ft). The aircraft continued its descent until 13:00, when the crew asked the controller for the weather condition at the airport. The controller told the crews that there was no precipitation and that there were scattered cumulonimbus clouds in the area. The crew acknowledged the report and continued their descent.

At 11 kilometres (6 nmi) from the airport, on 13:04 p.m, the aircraft had been established on the glide-slope. At this time, the aircraft had entered adverse weather condition with headwind and tailwind. The flight crews then requested clearance to land at Runway 21. The controller then contacted Flight 1145 and advised that there was a possibility of rain in the airport. The controller then cleared the aircraft to land at Runway 21, but warned the pilots that the runway could be slightly wet, indicating that hydroplaning was a possibility. The flight crews then acknowledged this message.

Flight 1145 then descended until it had passed the decision altitude of 307 feet (94 m). As the rain intensified, the visibility deteriorated. The unlit runway further aggravated the situation. Unable to make out the unlit runway through the rain, Captain Adebayo called for a go around (missed approach) at an altitude of about 200 feet (61 m) or approximately 120 feet (37 m) above the ground. This call was made about 100 feet (30 m) below the decision altitude. His decision, however, was too late as Flight 1145 was already too low for a go-around. The "TOO LOW-GEAR" warning then sounded and the flight crews tried to add more thrust. The flight crews had not managed to prepare the aircraft's configuration in a timely manner and the aircraft kept descending.

The DC-9 then slammed onto the grass strip between the runway and the taxiway. It then slid and struck a concrete drainage culvert located near the runway. The collision then disintegrated the aircraft. The tail section was immediately destroyed and the engine was lodged into the drainage. As it broke up, the fuel spilled and the aircraft burst into flames. The fuselage and the cockpit, now in flames, continued to slide for few hundreds metres before it finally came to rest on the taxiway.

=== Immediate aftermath ===
Of the 103 passengers and 7 crew members there were only two survivors, although seven survivors were initially rescued. Many passengers survived the initial impact but died in the resulting fire. Other passengers later died from their injuries. Port Harcourt Airport had one fire truck and no ambulances. None of 7 crew members survived the crash. Out of the 60 teenagers from Ignatius Loyola Jesuit College; a boarding school located in Abuja, 59 were killed, with Kechi Okwuchi being the only survivor from her school. Kechi was treated at Milpark Hospital in Johannesburg, South Africa and at Shriners Hospitals for Children in Galveston, Texas, United States. The other survivor was Bunmi Amusan who survived with 40% burns on her body.

== Investigation ==
=== Weather ===
Weather data was obtained from the Nigerian Meteorological Agency and from satellite imagery that were provided by Boeing. The data suggested that at 13:00 p.m, a sea breeze front, possibly reinforced by an outflow, pushed inland in the vicinity of Port Harcourt. This condition caused a rapidly deteriorating visibility during Flight 1145's approach to the airport. The leading edge of the boundary, in theory, also could have caused an abrupt increase in wind speed and significant changes on the direction of the wind, which would produce wind shear.

According to the AIB, the weather information was not relayed to the flight crews in a correct manner. The controller did not relay the wind speed and the possibility of a thunderstorm in the area. Had the controller relayed the information properly, the crew would have prepared the aircraft according to the said weather condition. The controller should have asked the crews to be vigilant on the prevailing wind condition. However, the controller had only cleared the aircraft to land and to exercise caution on the wet runway.

Further investigation revealed that Sosoliso Airlines didn't include wind shear recognition and recovery into its simulator training program.

=== Flight recorder analysis ===
As the flight recorders were retrieved by investigators, it was revealed that both flight recorders had been damaged by the impact forces and post-impact fire. The recorders were later taken to the United Kingdom for further analysis by the Air Accidents Investigation Branch.

The flight data recorder revealed that during Flight 1145's final approach the aircraft had passed the decision altitude of Port Harcourt Airport. The decision altitude is the exact altitude where pilots need to find the runway by visual reference until a certain point where the pilot decides to make a call for a go-around when visual contact with the runway has not been established. Flight 1145 leveled off at an altitude of 204 feet (62 m), which was below the minimum decision altitude of 307 feet (94 m). The airspeed then decreased to 145 knots and the aircraft kept descending even lower than 204 feet (62 m). A few seconds later, there was an increase of speed to 151 knots, indicating that the flight crews had decided to initiate a go-around. As the aircraft had descended well below 204 feet (62 m), the crew was unable to recover the aircraft as the altitude was too low. The data then ceased functioning when the aircraft speed was at 160 knots.

The cockpit voice recorder revealed that Captain Adebayo had called for a go-around approximately 16 seconds before the crash. As he called for a go-around, the flight crews added thrust and then tried to retract the gear and the flaps. As the flaps had not been completely retracted and the gears were not in its correct position, the "TOO LOW-GEAR" warning sounded.

According to the correct procedures for a missed approach, the flight crews should have set the take-off thrust, retracted the flaps to 15 degree and retracted the landing gear until a positive rate of climb had been established. The flight crews did try to follow the procedure, however the low altitude of Flight 1145, added by the bad weather condition at the time, prevented the flight crews from conducting a proper missed approach procedure. Flight 1145 was flying slightly above its stall speed and the windshear condition caused the airspeed to decrease. As such, the aircraft didn't climb in a timely manner and ultimately crashed onto the ground.

=== Other factors ===
There were several other findings that were included as contributing factors in the crash of Flight 1145.

The presence of a drainage culvert near an operating runway poses serious risks to other aircraft during the landing and take-off phase, particularly to aircraft that accidentally veer off of the runway. In the case of Flight 1145, the DC-9 exploded immediately after it had struck a drainage culvert located about 70 meters to the left of Runway 21. The report implied that there could be more survivors had the DC-9 not impacted the culvert.

Investigators also noted that the runway was only lit at certain conditions i.e at night, on request by pilots or during bad weather in the area. This was due to the unstable power supply from the Nigerian National Grid and the lack of resources and funds to maintain the lighting in the airport.

=== Conclusion ===
The final report was published on 26 July 2006. The Nigerian Accident Investigation Bureau concluded that the probable cause of the crash was due to the crew's decision to continue the approach beyond the Decision Altitude without having the runway in sight. The adverse weather condition was listed as a contributing factor.

The Nigerian AIB recommended that wind shear recognition and recovery should be made compulsory into pilot's initial and recurrent simulator training. This was not applied in a timely manner and resulted in another airliner crash a year later in Abuja which was caused by wind shear.

== Aftermath ==
The International Civil Aviation Organization (ICAO) mandates that each family of an air crash victim is entitled to only 3 million naira or US$18,157 from the airline. In January 2009 Harold Demuren, the director general of the Nigerian Civil Aviation Authority (NCAA), said that the families of the air crash victims would be compensated and that Sosoliso had already paid $2.3 million into an escrow account to compensate the families.

Pope Benedict XVI sent condolences to the families of victims and offered prayers for relief workers at the site of the accident.

In response to the crash, then-Nigerian President Olusegun Obasanjo cut short his visit to Portugal and vowed to overhaul the country's aviation sector and to "plug loopholes" of the aviation safety in Nigeria. A crisis meeting was later called and some senior air officials were suspended from their job.

=== Legacy ===
Andy and Ify Ilabor, the parents of crash victims Chuka, Nkem, and Busonma "Buso" Ilabor, started a foundation called the Ilabor Angels to assist orphans and AIDS victims.

Loyola Jesuit College dedicated a Memorial Hall to the deceased students. A Concerned Students Club was also created after the crash to discuss and reflect on the issues within Nigeria, and the school founded the Jesuit Memorial College in 2013 and Loyola Academy in 2014 which focus on providing education to lower income families.

== See also ==
- ADC Airlines Flight 053
- Bhoja Air Flight 213
- Flydubai Flight 981
- TransAsia Airways Flight 222
