= Harold Demuren =

Nigerian aeronautical engineer (born 1945)

Director General of the Nigerian Civil Aviation Authority
- In office 29 December 2005 – 11 March 2013
- Preceded by: Engr. Fidelis Onyeyiri
- Succeeded by: Capt. Fola Akinkuotu

Personal details
- Born: 31 May 1945 (age 81) Ijebu Ode, Southern Region, British Nigeria (now Ijebu Ode, Ogun State, Nigeria)
- Spouse: Osaretin Afusat Demuren
- Education: Massachusetts Institute of Technology
- Profession: Aeronautical engineer

Harold Olusegun Demuren (born 31 May 1945) is a Nigerian aeronautical engineer. He was Director General of the Nigerian Civil Aviation Authority from December 2005 to March 2013.

== Education ==
He attended Ijebu Ode Grammar School from January 1958 to December 1964 where he obtained Cambridge Higher School Certificate (HSC) and General Certificate of Education (GCE Advanced Level) in 1964. In 1965, he won a Soviet Union Government scholarship to study Aeronautical Engineering in the former USSR. He obtained a Diploma in Russian Language at the Moscow State University, Moscow, USSR (1965–1966). He proceeded to Kiev Institute of Aviation Engineers, Kiev in former Soviet Union where he obtained Master of Science in Aeronautical Engineering (M.Sc.) in 1972 and then to Massachusetts Institute of Technology (MIT), Cambridge, Massachusetts, USA for his Doctor of Science D.Sc. in Aircraft Gas Turbine & Jet Propulsion Engines (1975).

His research work was on the aerodynamic design, manufacturing and testing of high-temperature, high-pressure ratio transonic turbine blades for advanced gas turbines and jet aircraft engines for the United States Air Force and United States Navy at MIT. Gas Turbine and Jet Aircraft Propulsion Laboratory (1972–1974) and also a Joint experimental investigation with the Turbo-machinery Group of von Karman Institute for Fluid Dynamics at Rhode-Saint-Genèse, Belgium, a NATO Research Institute (1974–1975).

== Professional career ==
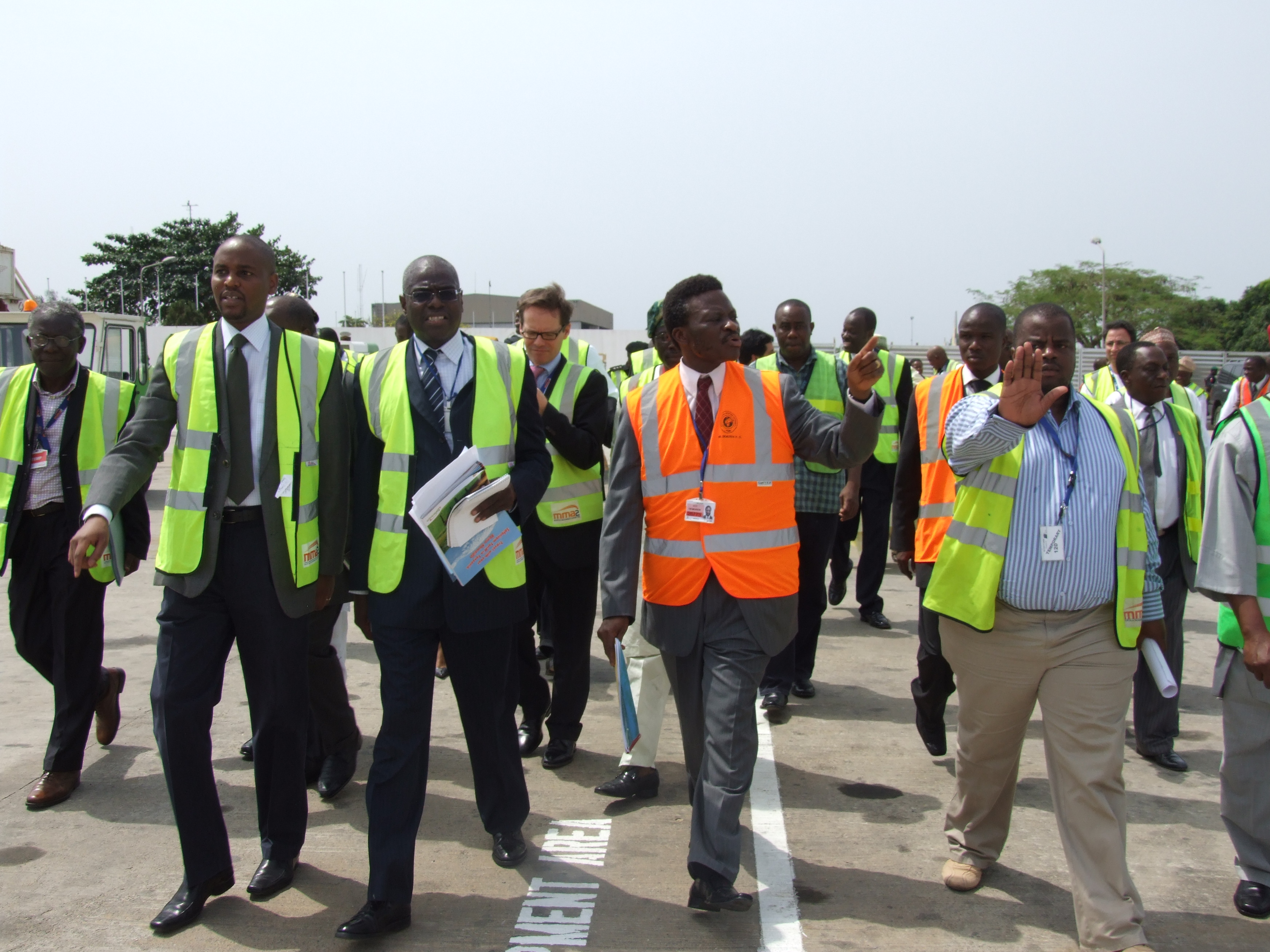
Dr. Demuren (middle) leading NCAA team conducting a routine ramp safety inspection at a Nigerian Airport.

He was recruited from the United States to join the Federal Ministry of Aviation, Nigeria in 1976 as Senior Airworthiness Surveyor and was made Assistant Director, Airworthiness in June 1989. On the creation of the defunct Federal Civil Aviation Authority in 1990, he was appointed Deputy Director Air Transport, Economic Regulations and Licensing. He became the Director Safety Services in 1991. In August 1995, he was "forced" into retirement because of his strict adherence to safety after a government "restructuring" exercise.

After retirement, he worked as Aviation Consultant and later formed Afrijet Airlines in 1998. Afrijet Airlines became one of the biggest Cargo Airline in the country by 2005, servicing various cargo destinations on the Continent. The airline also had strategic alliances with foreign partners including MK Airlines UK and Panalpina World Transport (Nigeria) Limited which expanded cargo aircraft operations and freight services from Europe (Luxembourg, London, Ostend, Munich, etc.) to Nigeria (Lagos, Kano, Abuja and Port Harcourt) and to other major African cities including Nairobi, Kinshasa, Accra, Johannesburg, Malabo, etc. In addition to operating cargo services from Nigeria, the airline also operated passenger flights in the Democratic Republic of the Congo, Equatorial Guinea and Gabon.

He was the Managing Director/Chief Executive of Afrijet Airlines until he was appointed Director General of the Nigerian Civil Aviation Authority in late December 2005. His appointment was later confirmed by the Senate of the Federal Republic of Nigeria in February 2007 in accordance with the Civil Aviation Act of 2006 that stipulates the tenure of 5 years for the Director General of NCAA.

== Director General, Nigerian Civil Aviation Authority ==
In late 2005, there was a loss of confidence in air travel and apathy in the aviation industry as two fatal air disasters in a span of 7 weeks left the nation mourning. The two incidents were Bellview Airlines Flight 210 that killed all 117 people on board on October 22, and Sosoliso Airlines Flight 1145 that killed 105 of 108 passengers, including 61 students from Loyola Jesuit College on December 10, 2005.

Dr. Demuren (left) receiving US FAA Category One Certification from former US Ambassador to Nigeria Robin Sanders (right) on August 23, 2010 in Nigeria

Following these tragic events, the Federal Government sought Dr. Demuren to head the Nigerian Civil Aviation Authority as its Director General in late December 2005 to revamp, reposition and restore confidence in domestic air travel. After his appointment, Demuren immediately took on the challenge of reforming the Nigerian Aviation sector and restoring the lost confidence to the Industry drawing up a strategic short, medium and long term plan anchored on Safety, Security and Satisfaction (consumer) in that order of priority. Dr. Demuren introduced a safety reform Agenda which enthroned professionalism, integrity and transparency in the conduct of Aviation business.

=== Christmas Day bomber ===
In December 2009, Demuren was first to provide vital information to the public on facts leading to Umar Farouk Abdul Mutallab's failed attempt as the "Christmas Day bomber". These included how Farouk bought his ticket in Accra, Ghana on KLM Airlines, proceeded on December 24 through the normal screening and check-in process, and had his US visa scanned through the Advance Passenger Information System which returned a "no-objection". Demuren also defended the Nigerian Airport security system by promptly providing information and footage, demonstrating the advance security and technological solutions deployed in Nigeria. The global community was astonished at the degree of detail and depth of the information provided by a so-called third world country in contrast to its reputation for chaos and mediocrity. Schiphol, Amsterdam Airport, Farouk's transit port, was unable to detect any irregularity during the security screening process. Following this incident and in order to enhance safety and security, Murtala Muhammed International Airport, Lagos, became one of the first worldwide to deploy full body scanners and explosive detection systems.

=== US FAA Category One Certification ===
On August 23, 2010, under the leadership of Dr. Demuren and the Nigerian Civil Aviation Authority, Nigeria attained American Federal Aviation Administration International Aviation Safety Assessment (FAA IASA) Category One Certification. This allows direct flights from Nigeria to Continental United States (USA). Prior to his appointment in 2005, there were no direct flights between Nigeria and USA. There are now several direct flights between Nigeria and U.S. destinations including Atlanta, New York and Washington, D.C., with services to Houston having begun in November 2011.

=== President of ICAO General Assembly ===
On September 28, 2010, Demuren was elected as the President of the 37th General Assembly of International Civil Aviation Organization (ICAO) held in Montreal, Canada from 28 September to 8 October 2010. The appointment was unanimously endorsed by all the delegates of the 190 contracting states of the ICAO. His emergence made history as the first time an African was elected to preside over the ICAO General Assembly, the United Nations global aviation agency. The assembly passed landmark policies on global Aviation Safety, Aviation Security and the Environment for the Industry. It was at this notable assembly that the historic Climate Change agreement was reached.

=== Dana air crash ===
Following 6 years of perfect record in aviation safety, on June 3, 2012, Dana Air Flight 992 crashed in the Iju-Ijesha neighborhood of Lagos resulting in loss of 153 people on board. The air accident investigation kicked off right after by the Accident Investigation Bureau (AIB) of Nigeria with support from the National Transportation Safety Board (NTSB) of the US. The flight data recorder (FDR) was sent for analysis to the United States with a team of investigators from the AIB. A joint committee made up of politicians from both the Senate and House of Assembly of Nigeria was set up by the federal government to investigate the crash. While investigation was still going on, there were several controversial reports that came up from allegations blaming the age and maintenance records of the aircraft to inadequate levels and contamination of fuel used. On February 11, 2013, the Wall Street Journal released a report which showed that the NTSB found the cause to be human error.

=== End of an era ===
On March 11, 2013, the federal government decided to take action on the action from the politically motivated committees which recommended that due to the age of aircraft and lack of maintenance causing the crash, the DG of NCAA should be removed. The statement released cited 'unsatisfactory response to stakeholders'. Following the announcement, various stakeholders all across the aviation industry voiced their grievances as to why a national hero who have kept the airspace safe for over 7 years and helped Nigeria attain category 1 amongst other accomplishments was unfairly treated.

== Notable achievements ==
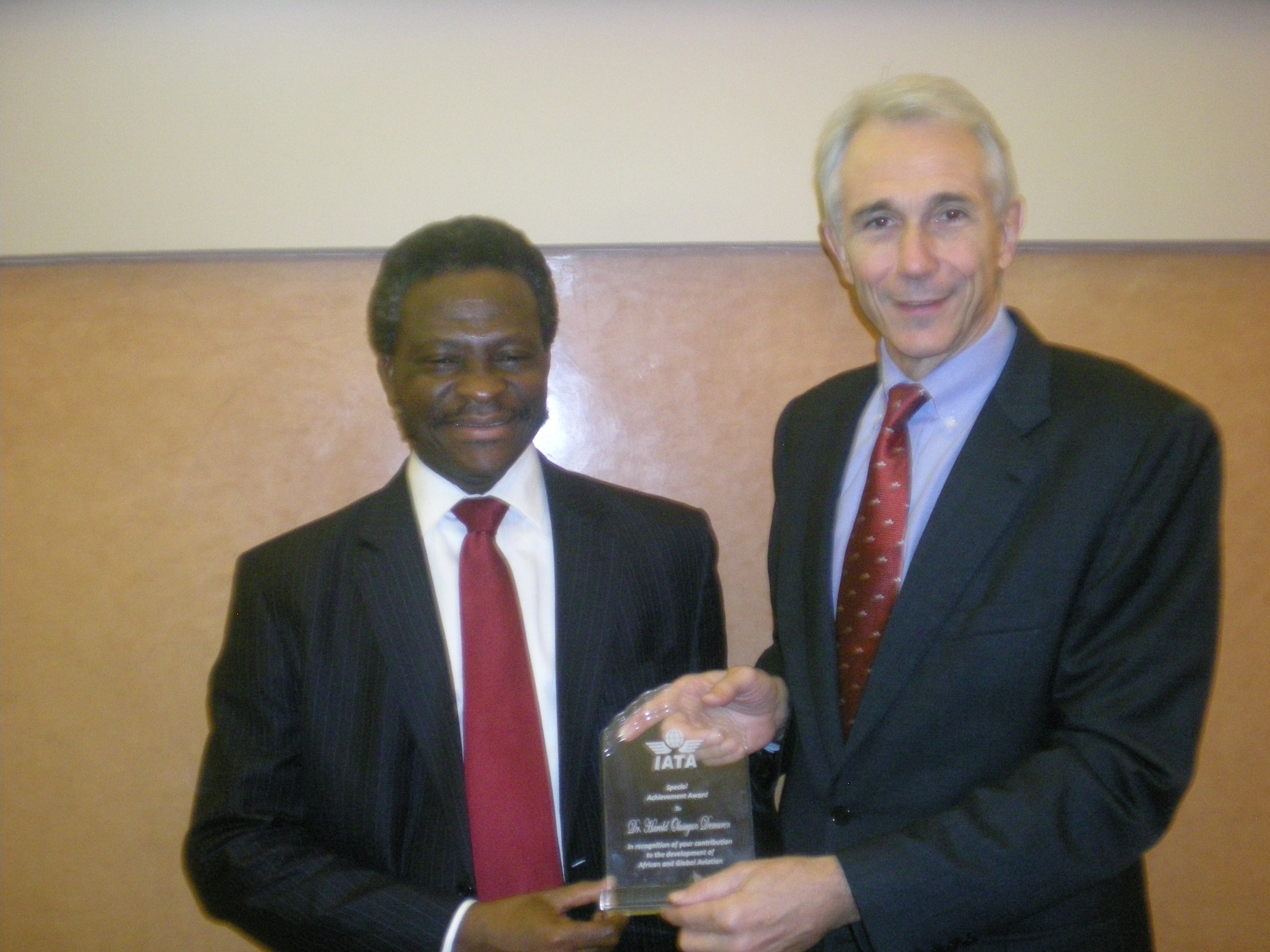
Dr. Demuren (left) receiving the 2011 IATA African Aviation "Personality of the Year" Award from IATA President Tony Tyler in Morocco in Nov 2011.

- 2014 FSF-Boeing Aviation Safety Lifetime Achievement Award - Nov 2014
- 2014 African Aviation Lifetime Achievement Award for outstanding services to African Aviation Development – Jun 2014
- 2011 IATA African Aviation "Personality of the Year" – Nov 2011
- 2010 Flight Safety Foundation "Laura Taber Barbour Air Safety Award" - Nov 2010
- 1st African to be elected President of ICAO General Assembly - Sept 2010
- Obtained U.S. FAA Category 1 Certification for Nigeria (6th African Country) - Aug 2010
- Led Nigeria to successfully complete the ICAO Universal Safety Audit - 2006, 2008 & 2010
- Led Nigeria to successfully implement the Document Tracking System, Flight Standards Group Portal, Flight Tracking Software, Inspector's Training System, Licensing Examination Portal, and Aeromedical Portal among others between 2008 & 2010.
- Led Nigeria to successful completion of the Aviation Security Audit of Murtala Muhammed International Airport and Nnamdi Azikiwe International Airport by the United States Transportation Security Administration (TSA) - 2006, 2007, 2008, 2009, 2010
- Fellow of the Royal Aeronautical Society – 2008
- Fellow of Nigeria Academy of Engineering – 2008
- Fellow of the Chartered Engineers (UK)
- 2008 This Day Awards "Regulator of the Year" - 2008

Dr. Demuren (left) with TSA Assistant Administrator, John Halinski (right), after signing a US/Nigeria Security Pact at the TSA Headquarters in Arlington, Virginia in June 2011

- Launched the IATA E-ticket / Billing and Settlement Plan (BSP) regime which revolutionized the Air travel industry in Nigeria – 2008
- Strived for the rapid passage of the Nigerian Civil Aviation Autonomy Bill into Law - 2006
- Implementing the Cape Town Convention replacing Old-Age Aircraft in Nigeria - 2006
- Re-established confidence in the Nigerian traveling public and international community after the tragic Air disasters of 2005
- Introduced a new Civil Aviation Safety Regulations that ensured Safety Oversight of all aviation activities in Nigeria in compliance ICAO Standards and Recommended Practices (SARPs).
- Laid the foundation of the National Civil Aviation Policy for Nigeria
- Longest-serving Director General of Nigerian Civil Aviation Authority (NCAA) – Dec 2005 to Mar 2013
- 1st and only African Member in the Board of Governors of Flight Safety Foundation – 2003 to Present
- President, Flight Safety Foundation (FSF) [West Africa – 2003 to present
- Co-Founder of Afrijet Airlines (1998)

== Family ==
Demuren has been married to Osaretin Afusat Demuren since 1973. They met for the first time as students in the former Soviet Union in 1969. They got engaged in Moscow, and later got married in Cambridge, Massachusetts in 1973. Mrs. Demuren, also a professional record achiever herself, rose to become the 1st Female Director of the Central Bank of Nigeria (CBN) in 1999 and retired from the Apex Bank after 33 years of service in 2009. She is currently the Chairman of the Board of Directors of Guaranty Trust Bank, one of the leading financial institutions in Africa. They have several children and grandchildren. He is the father of Segun Demuren (founder of the famous Nigerian record label Empire Mates Entertainment), Kunmi Demuren (Co-founder and Managing Partner of Venture Garden Group, GreenHouse Capital and Vibranium Valley) and Captain Tunde Demuren (a celebrity Pilot in Nigeria).
