= Angelica Hale =

Filipino-American singer (born 2007)

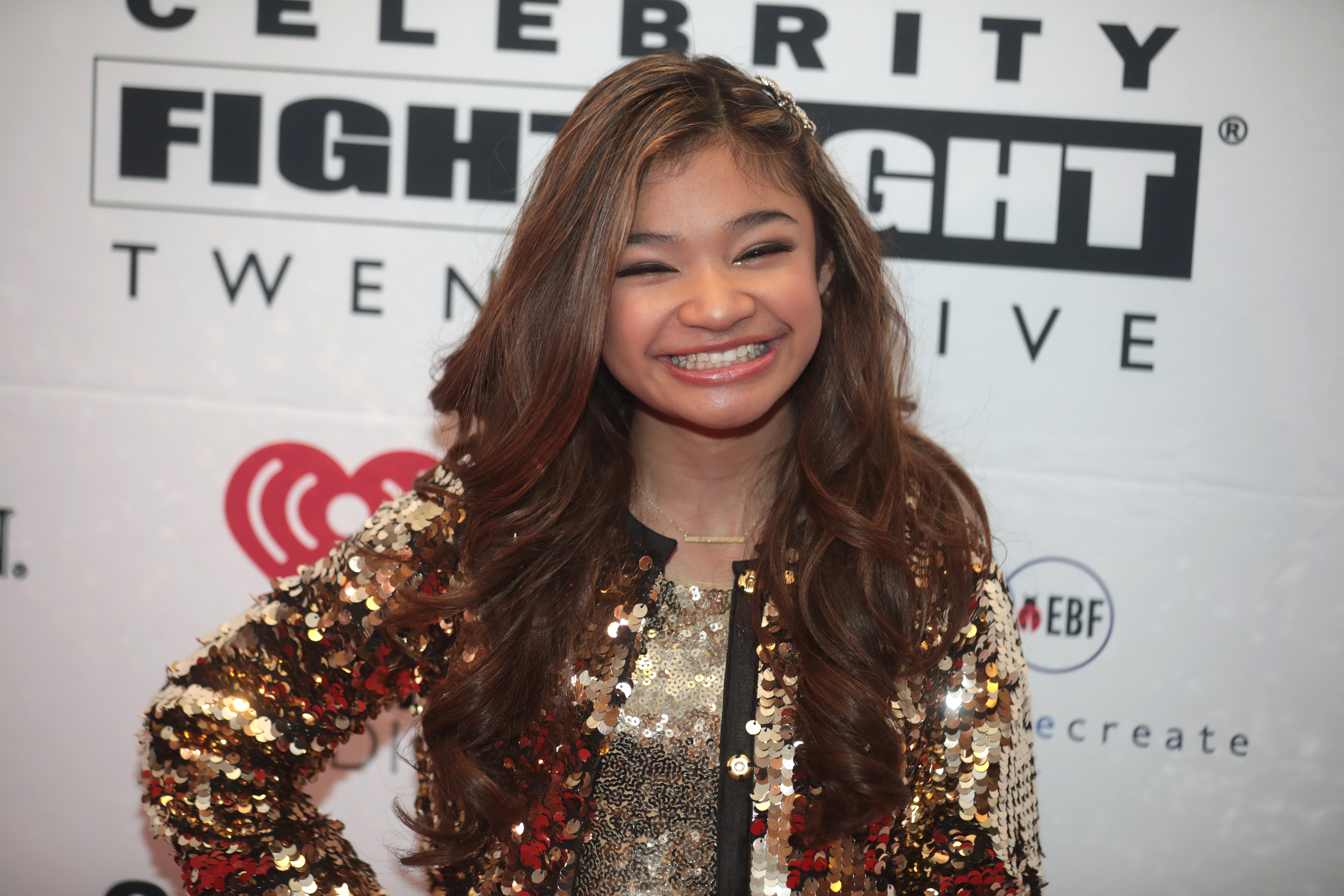
- Hale in 2019

Background information
- Born: July 31, 2007 (age 19); Atlanta, Georgia, U.S.
- Occupations: Singer, songwriter, actress
- Years active: 2017–present

Angelica Hale (born July 31, 2007) is a Filipino-American singer, songwriter, musician and actress. She competed in the 12th season of America's Got Talent, and became the runner-up to winner Darci Lynne. She made her debut at the 2017 Macy’s Thanksgiving Day Parade.

== Early life ==
Angelica Hale was born on July 31, 2007 and was living in Atlanta, Georgia in 2019. Her father's name is James, and her mother's name is Eva.

At the age of four, Hale contracted a severe bacterial pneumonia causing septic shock and multiple organ failure, including her kidneys, and suffered permanent scarring on her right lung. She was placed in a medically-induced coma, transferred from Children's Healthcare of Atlanta Scottish Rite to Children's Healthcare of Atlanta Egleston, and placed on ECMO life-support. After spending 12 days on ECMO and 80 days in the hospital recovering, she was released to go home on April 24, 2012. On September 13, 2013 after spending a year and a half on dialysis, Hale received a life-saving kidney transplant from her mother.

Soon afterwards, Hale began taking singing lessons with vocal coach Tara Simon in Alpharetta, Georgia. She then won a singing competition for five- to nine-year-olds, and has performed for many charitable functions, such as Children's Miracle Network Hospitals and Children's Healthcare of Atlanta.

== Career ==
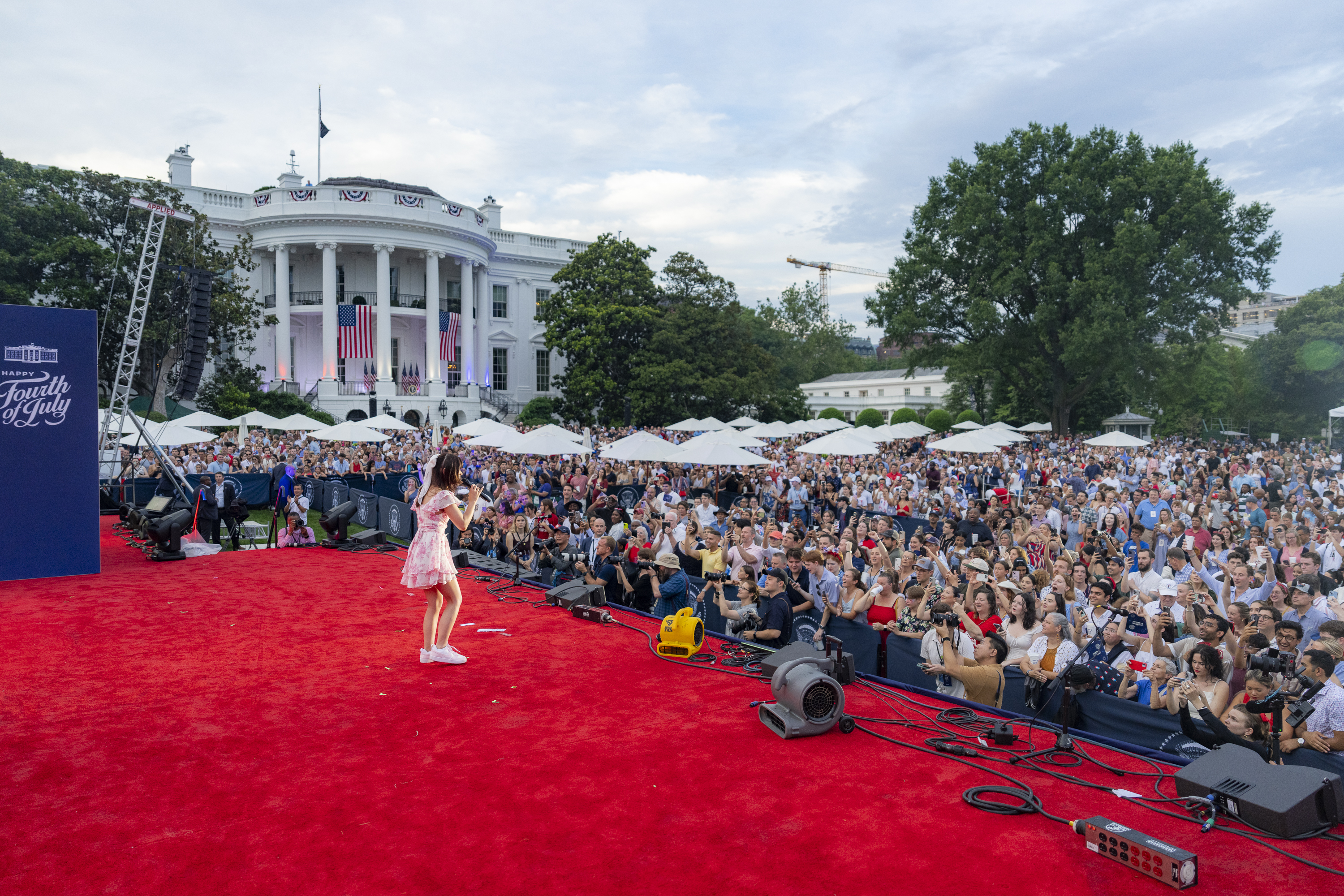
Hale performing at the White House on July 4, 2024

=== America's Got Talent ===
In 2017, Hale competed on season 12 of America's Got Talent, where she made it past the auditions round with her rendition of "Rise Up" by Andra Day. In the Judge Cuts round, Hale was given a golden buzzer by guest judge Chris Hardwick, after covering Alicia Keys' "Girl on Fire", and advanced immediately. During the live shows, she sang "Clarity" by Zedd and Foxes at the Quarterfinals and "Without You" by David Guetta for her Semifinals performance. Hale advanced to the Top 10 finals where she performed "Symphony" by Clean Bandit and Zara Larsson. For the finale in episode 22, she performed "Stronger (What Doesn't Kill You)" by Kelly Clarkson with Clarkson and fellow contestant Kechi Okwuchi. Hale finished the competition in second place behind Darci Lynne, becoming the youngest runner-up in the show's history.

Hale was a finalist on America's Got Talent: The Champions, having received a golden buzzer advancement from judge Howie Mandel immediately after her performance of "Fight Song" by Rachel Platten. She placed in the bottom 7 of the top 12.

=== Post-America's Got Talent ===
Shortly after America's Got Talent, Hale performed in Tuckahoe, New York, for a crowd of 7,000 people. She became the first child ambassador of the National Kidney Foundation. She performed at the AGT live shows from November 2–5 at Las Vegas with Darci Lynne, Light Balance, and Preacher Lawson. In addition, Hale performed at the 2017 NFL game between the Atlanta Falcons and the Dallas Cowboys in Atlanta at Mercedes-Benz Stadium. She performed the national anthem on December 11, 2017 at Heinz Field for the Pittsburgh Steelers and Baltimore Ravens. Hale performed “Girl on Fire” at the 2017 Macy's Thanksgiving Day Parade. In March 2018, she performed at Celebrity Fight Night with David Foster and on Little Big Shots. On March 29, 2018, the National Hockey League's Ottawa Senators invited her to perform both the Star-Spangled Banner and O Canada at the beginning of a game against the Florida Panthers. Hale sang the National Anthem on October 8, 2018 in Atlanta for the Atlanta Braves vs. Los Angeles Dodgers Game 4 of the National League Division Series. Hale performed "Santa Claus is Coming to Town" from her Christmas album Christmas Wonder in the halftime show for the NFL Atlanta Falcons and Arizona Cardinals in Atlanta at Mercedes-Benz Stadium on December 16, 2018. As of July 2019, Hale was training with renowned vocal coach Tara Simon.

Hale released her debut single "Feel the Magic", a pop song written by the eleven-year-old singer-songwriter herself. The song's music video premiered in May 2019 on YouTube and Facebook. As a recording artist, Hale loves to express herself through music and sing about her life experiences. It was her personal journey that inspired her to write her debut single.

Hale joined the Filipino boy band TNT Boys on their world tour in April 2019.

On July 4, 2019, she performed live on the annual PBS special, A Capitol Fourth.

=== Acting career ===
Hale filmed her first film, American Reject, over the summer of 2018 in New Orleans, Louisiana. The anticipated release date was in 2019.

She also voiced the titular character in the animated series Maya Unstoppable, which premiered in 2019.

In 2023 she appeared in the pre-Broadway production of the Boop! The Musical in Chicago's CIBC Theatre from November 19-December 24, 2023, then on Broadway on April 5, 2025 with Hale reprising her role.

=== Sepsis Alliance ===
In the spring of 2018, Hale was named as the national spokesperson for Sepsis Alliance's "It's About TIME" campaign, which raises awareness for sepsis as a medical emergency.

== Discography ==
=== Extended plays ===
Title	EP details
Christmas Wonder	Released: December 17, 2018; Label: Angelica Hale Entertainment; Format: Digital download
Feel the Magic	Released October 18, 2019; Label: Angelica Hale Entertainment; Format: Digital download
Joy to the World	Released: December 1, 2019; Label: Angelica Hale Entertainment; Format: Digital download
What's It Like	Released: July 31, 2020; Label: Angelica Hale Entertainment; Format: Digital download

=== Singles ===
Year	Title	Album
2018	No Time to Waste	Non-album single (Released through Sepsis Alliance)
2019	Feel the Magic	Feel the Magic - EP
2019	Overcome	Feel the Magic - EP
2020	What About Us	Non-album single
2020	Reindeer In Here Rock	Non-album single
2021	Looking Up	Non-album single
2021	Set a Place at Your Table	Non-album single
