= Godwin Ehigiamusoe =

Nigerian entrepreneur

Godwin Eseiwi Ehigiamusoe
- Born: August 21, 1958 (age 67); Nigeria
- Education: University of Benin, Ambrose Alli University
- Occupations: Entrepreneur and financier
- Known for: Founder of LAPO Microfinance Bank

Godwin Eseiwi Ehigiamusoe (born 21 August 1958) is a Nigerian entrepreneur and microfinance practitioner. He is the founder of LAPO Microfinance Bank.

== Education and career ==
Ehigiamusoe completed his bachelor's degree in sociology and a master's degree in Sociology of Development from the University of Benin. He later obtained a PhD in Policy and Development Studies from Ambrose Alli University, Ekpoma.

In 1987, in response to the social dislocations of Nigeria's Structural Adjustment Programme, Ehigiamusoe founded LAPO as a non-profit focused on poverty alleviation through microcredit and allied social programmes. After LAPO's lending arm evolved into a regulated microfinance institution in 2010, Ehigiamusoe was became the bank's founding MD/CEO till 2020. In March 2025, he became board chairman, succeeding Osaretin Demuren.
