= Once I Was a Beehive =

- Directed by: Maclain Nelson
- Screenplay by: Maclain Nelson
- Produced by: Maclain Nelson; Jake Van Wagoner
- Starring: Paris Warner; Mila Smith; Clare Niederpruem; Lisa Valentine Clark; Hailey Smith; Barta Heiner; Adam Johnson
- Distributed by: 20th Century Fox
- Release date: August 14, 2015
- Running time: 119 minutes
- Country: United States
- Box office: $732,655

Once I Was a Beehive is a 2015 American comedy film written and directed by Maclain Nelson, about a girl who attends an LDS Young Women's camp. The film was shot in Utah, and Upstate New York. It received positive reviews from critics. (A "beehive" in the title is a now-retired name used by the Church of Jesus Christ of Latter-day Saints to refer to 12- and 13-year-old girls.)

== Plot ==
Lane Speer (Paris Warner) is a young girl who enjoys camping with her parents. A year after Lane's father dies of cancer, her mother remarries a Mormon. Before the wedding they inform Lane she will be staying with her new "step aunt" where she is encouraged to attend a week-long girls' Bible camp organized by the LDS Young Women. Lane decides to go on the trip so does her phobic stepcousin Phoebe (Mila Smith) will also go.

The girls' first task is to set up their tepees. Most of the girls rush the job to get to the lake, but Lane and Phoebe take their time. It rains the following night, flooding the other girls' tents, and they all crowd into Lane and Phoebe's. Phoebe has secretly brought her dog Roxy to camp, and she tells them to keep it a secret.

After the night in the tent, the girls take a hike to a glacier. On the way, they get lost, going around in circles. Lane takes the map from Bree and discovers she was holding it the wrong way, making Bree look stupid. When they get to the glacier, Bree makes a catty remark to Lane about her "trying to impress everyone" and tells her to just be herself, because people like her better that way. Lane "accidentally" gives Bree a bloody nose by throwing an ice ball at her. The girls make snowcones from the glacier.

After whittling at the fire, Lane tries to make amends with Bree by cooking dinner for her and they eventually make up after Bree throws a tantrum.

While the girls prepare for the "Trial of Faith" event, a bear raids the camp and Phoebe becomes convinced that it ate Roxy. They run into the bear and play dead to make it ignore them.

Together, they decide to go through with the "Trial of Faith" activity, described as a Sunday school lesson taught by Indiana Jones. Phoebe uses her knowledge to help the girls solve the various puzzles and they eventually find "Noah's Ark". The bishop arrives and reveals that Roxy is still alive. On the last night of camp, they have a testimony meeting and Phoebe, Lane, and Bree share their experiences. At the final camp talent show, Lane and Phoebe perform their new song "Together".

== Cast ==
- Paris Warner — Lane Speer
- Lisa Clark — Carrie Carrington
- Hailey Smith — Holly Valentine
- Clare Niederpruem — Bree Carrington
- Barta Heiner — Nedra Rockwell
- Amy Biedel — Audrey Speer
- Adam Johnson — Robert Speer
- Brett Merritt — Tristan Samuelson
- Allie Jennings — Charlotte
- Kaley McCormack — Mindy
- Ariana Bagley — Myleka
- Ashley Santos — Paige
- Mila Smith — Phoebe Valentine
- Audrey Nelson — Hannah
- Zoe Wilde — Mykelle
- Ken Craig — Bishop Rudd
- Kiani Atkinson — Makenna
- Jason Celaya — Ranger Craig
- Tank the Bear - The Bear
- Chase Brown - Ranger Jef

== Production and release ==
Once I Was a Beehive was filmed in Ithaca, New York, Payson, Utah and Provo Canyon. The scenes featuring a bear were shot on location with a trained Grizzly bear named Tank hailing from Heber City, Utah's Wasatch Rocky Mountain Wildlife. The film's ark was made by a local woodcrafter and was temporarily lost during transport because it was not properly attached to the vehicle.

Sneak-peek screenings aired in various towns in Utah in early August. It was released in Utah on 18 August, and expanded to theaters in Idaho and Arizona in September. It was released by Purdie Distribution and saw a wide release of 32 theaters and grossed a total of $732,655.

== Soundtrack ==
The film's soundtrack was released in December and features the following songs:

#	Title	Performer(s)	Length
1	"To the Sky"	Natasha Watts	3:11
2	"Great Unknown"	Kenz Hall	3:20
3	"Believe"	Sam Means	2:38
4	"Come, Thou Fount of Every Blessing"	Jessica Frech	3:04
5	"I Got Your Back"	Kayliann	2:34
6	"Together (Film Version)"	Paris Warner	1:53
7	"Love and Pain"	Sam Means	2:43
8	"The Spirit of God Like a Fire Is Burning"	The Sabre Rattlers	3:40
9	"River"	Belle Jewel	3:27
10	"Together (Contest Version)"	Evie Clair	1:54
11	"For You"	Evie Clair	3:32
12	"Together (Performance Track)"	Beehive Sing-Along	1:52

== Reception ==
On Rotten Tomatoes the film has an approval rating of 75% based on reviews from 8 critics, with an average rating of 6.2/10.

Eric D. Snider gave the film a B+ grade and praised it for being "funny, sweet, AND sincere." Adam Forsgren (East Idaho News) included Once I Was a Beehive as one of his 10 favorite films of 2015, commending it for deriving its humor from the characters instead of LDS culture. Kerry Legel gave the film a mixed review, praising the acting but criticizing some dialogue. Kai Elijah Hamilton also praised the film in his review, "Director Maclain Nelson gets extreme praise for making this a film everyone can connect with. It is not a Mormon film. It is a film where the characters happen to be Mormon. Upfront it expects us to understand that these characters are real people with misunderstood beliefs—and in one fell swoop quietly wipes away any taboos. It is a charming film about faith, healing and coming of age. It is not preachy. It is touching. It is as sweet and rich as honey."

The film was a finalist in the best film category of the 2015 AML Awards, but ultimately lost to Peace Officer.

== Sequel ==
A sequel, Once I Was Engaged, was released in 2021. It stars the character of Bree Carrington, who gets engaged while at BYU Hawaii and her loving but over-the-top mom goes all out to create the wedding of the century. But both mother and daughter must overcome the pressure of perfection when this happily ever after story doesn't go quite as expected.
