= Osaretin =

- Gender: Male
- Language: Edo

Origin
- Origin: Edo
- Derivation: Osaretinmwen
- Meaning: "God is my power" or "God is powerful"
- Region of origin: South-south Nigeria

Other names
- Nicknames: Osas, Osare, Retin
- Related names: Osaetin; Osaretinmwen; Osaratin; Osazuwamen; Osagie; Osarogue; Uyiosa; Osatohanwmen; Osariemen; Osarieme

Osaretin is a masculine name of Edo origin from Nigeria and is a compound of the words descending from Osa,- "God," Re,- "my" and Etin- "power", and it therefore means 'God is my power', 'God is powerful' or 'God is my strength'.

== People with the given name ==
- Osaretin Demuren - Nigerian banker and first female Chairman of Guaranty Trust Bank.
- Sarz; Osabuohien Osaretin - Nigerian record producer
