= Sosoliso Airlines =

Nigerian scheduled, domestic, passenger airline

IATA	ICAO	Call sign
SO	OSL	SOSOLISO
- Founded: 1994
- Ceased operations: 2007
- Frequent-flyer program: Smart flyer
- Fleet size: 6
- Destinations: 5
- Headquarters: Ikeja, Lagos State, Nigeria
- Key people: Victor Ikwuemesi
- Website: sosolisoairline.com

Sosoliso Airlines Limited was a Nigerian scheduled, domestic, passenger airline. For much of its existence it had its head office in Ikeja, Lagos State. Originally its head office was on the grounds of Enugu Airport in Enugu.

== History ==
It was established in 1994 and started operations in July 2000. The Nigerian government set a deadline of 30 April 2007 for all airlines operating in the country to re-capitalise or be grounded, in an effort to ensure better services and safety. Seven airlines failed to meet the deadline and as a result would not be allowed to fly in Nigeria's airspace with effect from 30 April 2007. These were: ADC Airlines, Fresh Air, Sosoliso Airlines, Albarka Air, Chrome Air Service, Dasab Airlines and Space World Airline. The affected airlines would only fly when they satisfied the Nigerian Civil Aviation Authority (NCAA)’s criteria in terms of re-capitalization and thus be re-registered for operation.

== Destinations ==
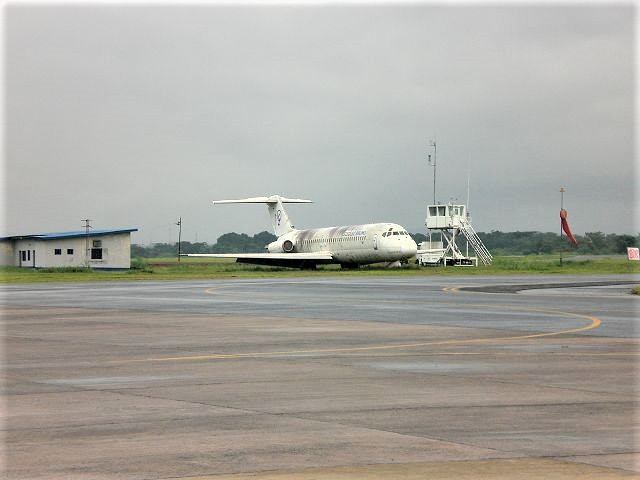
A DC 9-30 from Sosoliso Airlines at Enugu Airport

Sosoliso Airlines operated flights to Enugu, Port Harcourt, Owerri, Abuja and Lagos. Reservations are possible.

== Accidents and incidents ==
- Sosoliso Airlines Flight 1145

== See also ==
- Airlines of Africa
