= Jacques Heim (choreographer) =

French-born dance choreographer (born 1964)

- Born: March 18, 1964 (age 62); Paris, France
- Occupation: Choreographer
- Known for: Diavolo | Architecture in Motion, Kà by Cirque du Soleil

Jacques Heim is a French-born dance choreographer who founded Diavolo Dance Theater in 1992 after graduating from California Institute of the Arts. He was born and raised in Paris, France. As a young man, Heim moved to New York City, and shortly thereafter received his BFA in Theater, Dance, and Film at Middlebury College in Vermont. He then moved to England and received his Certificate for Analysis and Criticism of Dance from University of Surrey. After his stay in England he came back to America, only this time to California, where he would receive his MFA in Choreography from the California Institute of the Arts.

== DIAVOLO | Architecture in Motion ==
In 1992, Jacques Heim founded DIAVOLO | Architecture in Motion, a dance company based in Los Angeles, California. It is a highly original contemporary dance ensemble that uses "architecture in motion" to explore the relationship between the human body and its environment. DIAVOLO blends modern dance, acrobatics, and gymnastics, and other forms of movement to create the stylistically varied and intensely physical choreography that has become the hallmark of this company.

DIAVOLO is one of the most successful dance companies based in Los Angeles, being only 1 of 3 companies to endure and create for 25 years in Los Angeles. Heim describes the work of his company as "architecture in motion", because the company explores the relation and interaction between the human body and its architectural environment to understand how we are being affected not only socially, but physically and emotionally. Throughout the years, DIAVOLO has been noted as one of the forerunners in the dance community, as noted by the LA Times, "Jacques Heim's locally based Diavolo again proved that its brand of iconoclastic movement might very well be the dance bridge to the 21st century."

The company has a second branch, the DIAVOLO Institute, which provides educational and outreach opportunities to people of all ages and abilities while touring and at home in Los Angeles, sharing the pioneering art form and the power of dance as a means of social impact.

In 2016, The DIAVOLO Institute expanded their programs and created The Veterans Project, conceived by executive director Jennifer Cheng and led by artistic director Jacques Heim. Inspired by Sebastian Junger's book Tribe, the program works with military veterans on their transition to civilian life. Phase 1 premiered in 2016 at Hollywood American Legion Post 43, and Phase 2 premiered on Veterans Day, November 11, 2017, at the Valley Performing Arts Center, which was renamed the Younes and Soraya Nazarian Center for the Performing Arts.

== Choreography ==
Heim not only choreographs a number of short and full-length works for DIAVOLO, but has directed many projects around the United States and internationally. One of his most notable choreographic achievements was invitation by Cirque du Soleil to choreograph the show, Kà, which premiered in 2005 at the MGM Grand Las Vegas hotel. KÀ has been named "the most technically advanced production in the Western Hemisphere and perhaps the world" and in 2016, the Las Vegas Weekly wrote, "KÀ’s technical marvel remains unmatched". It is without a doubt that KÀ remains is one of the greatest shows in the history of Las Vegas. Merge Kà's elite human performances with the ever-evolving technology put at Cirque du Soleil's disposal and you are left with a stunning show that stays with you for days.

Most recently, Jacques Heim and DIAVOLO were seen on Season 12 of America's Got Talent, and finished in the top 10. Heim and DIAVOLO’s appearances were defined by structural elements in their work. Simon Cowell, Howie Mandel, MelB, and Heidi Klum commented on the company's highly original and daring approach to entertainment.

In 2005, Heim was also the Artistic Director for the Taurus World Stunt Awards, and in 2007 he returned to Taurus to stage a stunt piece called "The Car". He was the Creative Director for the Opening Ceremony of The 16th Asian Games, in Guangzhou, China His work has made appearances on the television shows Dancing with the Stars and Step It Up and Dance, as well as on the theatrical stage, as he created choreography for the play, The Stones.

Jacques has taught dance at Ballet Pacifica, California State University, Los Angeles and the University of California, Los Angeles. and recently had his company perform at the Grammy's 2024 with Dua Lipa https://www.instagram.com/diavolo_la/p/C28udgSLzH0/?img_index=1

== Awards and press ==
Heim has received three USA Fellowship nominations and four Alpert Awards in the Arts nominations. He received the Martha Hill Choreography Award of the American Dance Festival, as well as the Special Prize of the Jury at the 6th Saitama International Dance Festival. Heim also was awarded a Brody Arts Fund fellowship, and a James Irvine Foundation Fellowship.

== Family history ==
Heim's grandfather, also named Jacques Heim, was a Parisian fashion designer who invented the bikini alongside Louis Réard.
