= Diavolo Dance Theater =

American dance company

Diavolo | Architecture in Motion (simply known as Diavolo) is an American dance company founded in 1992 by French Dancer, Choreographer and Director Jacques Heim. The company's movement style encompasses modern dance, acrobatics, theater and gymnastics. Diavolo has been based in Los Angeles since its founding and has toured across the United States, Canada, Europe, Asia, and Latin America.

Diavolo is most well known from their appearance on America’s Got Talent S12.

== The Company ==
Upon completion of his MFA (Dance and Choreography) at the California Institute of the Arts, Jacques Heim started Diavolo | Architecture in Motion, which performs acrobatic and modern dance movement on a variety of oversized architectural moving structures.

Alongside his position as artistic director of Diavolo, Heim was hired in 2005 by Cirque du Soleil to choreograph a show in Las Vegas called Kà. Heim has also choreographed television shows, movies, as well as special events worldwide. His work appeared on BBC America's Dancing with the Stars (U.S. TV series), as well as Bravo's Step It Up and Dance.

However, most of Heim's time is spent choreographing for and touring with Diavolo. The company's repertoire presents dance that is redefined "through dynamic movement, enlightening communities through trust, teamwork, and individual expression" as articulated in the company's mission statement. Beginning with Bonjour/Sleepwalking, which was choreographed in 1992, Heim has created and continues to create pieces that epitomize the Diavolo aesthetic emphasized in the mission statement.

Diavolo made its European debut at the Edinburgh Festival Fringe in 1995, and in 1998, the company opened the performance series at the new Getty Center Museum in Los Angeles. Diavolo's first full-evening-length work, Catapult, was created in 1999, which was also the year of the first full North American tour for the company.

In spring 2002, Diavolo created a second smaller company to perform in a cabaret-style show, which ran for eight weeks at the New Shinagawa Prince Hotel in Tokyo, Japan.

Diavolo collaborated with the Los Angeles Philharmonic to create a trilogy of dance works performed at the Hollywood Bowl. In 2007, Foreign Bodies premiered, set to the music of Esa-Pekka Salonen, followed by Fearful Symmetries in 2010, set to the music of John Adams. In 2013, Fluid Infinities, set to the music of Philip Glass, completed the trilogy on the Hollywood Bowl stage.

Diavolo also engages in community work and educational outreach (Through the Diavolo's Veterans Project or The Diavolo Institute Program) which includes holding classes, workshops, and seminars for children and adults. Many of the workshops are regularly held at schools, hospitals, and juvenile detention centers.

== Past Company Dancers ==
2026 — 2027 :

2025 — 2026 :

2024 — 2025 :

2023 — 2024 :

2022 — 2023 :

2021 — 2022 : *Paused touring during Covid-19 Pandemic* Held virtual workshop over zoom.

2020 — 2021 : *Paused touring for Covid 19 Pandemic* but Filmed and had a virtual showing of “Diavolo | This is Me : Letters From The Front Lines.” With Dancers, Bethany Rose Boutwell, Kate Dougherty, Daniel Jacob Glenn, Simon Greenberg, Anna-Marie Knutson, Aubrey Lawrence, Kelsey Long, Derion Loman, Majella Loughran, Ezra Masse-Mahar, Abraham Meisel, Lex Shimko and Matthew Wagner + Front Line Workers.

2019 — 2020 : Unexpected Final Tour Season “Bethany Rose Boutwell, Christopher Carvalho, Kate Dougherty, Daniel Jacob Glenn, Simon Greenberg, Anna-Marie Knutson, Aubrey Lawrence, Kelsey Long, Majella Loughran, Ezra Masse-Mahar, Abraham Meisel, Lex Shimko and Matthew Wagner”

2018 — 2019 : “Christopher Borrero, Christopher Carvalho, Kate Dougherty, Simon Greenberg, Steven Jasso, Aubrey Lawrence, Derion Loman, Majella Loughran, Danielle Maloney, Chantelle Mrowka, Madison Olandt, Matthew Wagner, Kimara Wood“

2017 — 2018 :

2016 — 2017 :

2015 — 2016 :

2014 — 2015 :

2013 — 2014 :

2012 — 2013 :

2011 — 2012 :

2010 — 2011 :

2009 — 2010 :

2008 — 2009 :

2007 — 2008 :

2006 — 2007 :

2005 — 2006 :

2004 — 2005 :

2002 — 2003 :

2001 — 2002 :

2000 — 2001 :

1999 — 2000 :

1998 — 1999 :

1997 — 1998 :

1996 — 1997 :

1995 —1996 :

1994 — 1995 :

1993 — 1994 :

1992 — 1993 : Company Founded

== Repertoire ==
The most notable pieces in Diavolo's repertoire are: Catapult (1999), Trajectoire (1999, 2001), Humachina (2002, 2006), L'Espace Du Temps, The Trilogy [Foreign Bodies (2007), Fearful Symmetries (2010), Fluid Infinities (2013)], and Transit Space (2012).

Demo footage of the company's repertoire can be found on the company's YouTube page (linked below).

A full list of Diavolo repertoire can be found on the company's website.

=== Corporate work ===
Diavolo Creative Productions is the corporate sector of the company. It has created performance events for corporate clients such as Wells Fargo Bank, Honda, Sebastian Inc. and General Motors.

== Educational and community outreach ==
While educational and community outreach has been a part of Diavolo since its inception in 1992, the program began to grow in 1998 and continues to do so with educational performances and instructional programming. At the launch of its pilot programs in 2012, The Diavolo Institute received funding from the James Irvine Foundation, the W.M. Keck Foundation, and others.

The Diavolo Institute aka “Volo” provides dance education and active arts participation for low-income youth and their families in the Los Angeles area. The program includes highlights such as: L.A. Familia (a multi-generational dance night that uses dance and everyday movement to get entire families working together), L.A. Unity (a regular workshop series that culminates in school and community performances on the distinct Diavolo set pieces), and T.R.U.S.T. (an interactive in-school assembly show, featuring trust exercises and student participation).

In 2010, Diavolo received an American Masterpieces grant from the University of Georgia Research Foundation from the National Endowment for the Arts to fund educational activities. Diavolo received another grant from the National Endowment for the Arts in 2012.

== Awards and recognition ==
In 1995 during its European debut at the Edinburgh Festival Fringe, Diavolo was named "Best of the Fest" by The London Independent and "Critics Choice" by The Guardian.

The Dance Resource Center of Greater Los Angeles presented the 1995 Lester Horton Dance Award to Diavolo Dance Theater for outstanding achievement in performance/company.

The Carpenter Performing Arts Center CSULB honored Diavolo Dance Theater as the Arts in Education Hero of the year 2006 presented for Diavolo's support and dedication to bringing the arts to young people. On September 28, 2007, Diavolo was recognized as a cultural treasure of Los Angeles and was presented the Certificate of Recognition from the City of Los Angeles.

Los Angeles Times dance critic Lewis Segal reviewed Diavolo's 2007 and 2010 Hollywood Bowl performances with the LA Philharmonic, saying that Diavolo exemplifies one of "those rare events that define the art of this city, when the levels of vision and support are equally exceptional….[Diavolo] makes precisely coordinated feats look improvisational, even reckless….To say Diavolo is exciting is redundant."

In 2017, Diavolo performed in Season 12 of America's Got Talent, debuting in week 3 as the only acrobatic dance group among several dance troupes. In week 2 of the semifinals, Diavolo won the Judges' Choice Award to advance to the Finals, where it finished in the bottom 5 of the top 10.

In 2024, Jacque Heim of Diavolo Choreographed (with the help of Diavolo Company Members and Charm La'Donna) for Dua Lipa and the company performed alongside her at The 66th Annual Grammy Awards : https://www.youtube.com/watch?v=AO6PocKRfKM
