= Braamfontein Werf =

- Location within Gauteng Location within South Africa
- Coordinates: 26°11′12″S 28°1′6″E
- Country: South Africa
- Province: Gauteng
- Municipality: City of Johannesburg
- Time zone: UTC+2 (SAST)

Braamfontein Werf is a suburb of Johannesburg, South Africa. It is located in Region F of the City of Johannesburg Metropolitan Municipality. Braamfontein Werf is part of the area known as Milpark, along with small parts of neighboring suburbs like Parktown.
