= Loyola Jesuit College =

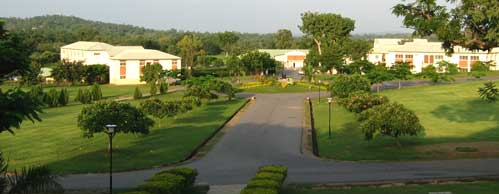
- School overview photo

Location
- Abuja; Nigeria; 4°55′37.9″N 6°58′0.76″E

Information
- Type: Private school
- Motto: Service of God and others
- Religious affiliation: Christianity
- Denomination: Catholicism
- Patron saint: Ignatius of Loyola
- Established: 2 October 1996; 29 years ago
- Founders: Society of Jesus
- President: Ubong Attai
- Principal: Alexander Irechukwu
- Gender: Co-educational
- Age range: 10-18
- Enrollment: 656
- Language: English
- Campus size: 28.5 hectares (70 acres)
- Campus type: Urban
- Colors: Blue and white
- Mascot: Roaring Lion
- Alumni: Loyolans
- Website: www.loyolajesuit.org

Loyola Jesuit College is a private Catholic secondary school in Abuja, Nigeria. It was founded on 2 October 1996 by the Society of Jesus in Nigeria and was named after the founder, Ignatius of Loyola.

== History ==
In 1962, the New York Province of the Society of Jesus established a mission in Nigeria. By 2005, with many Nigerians and Ghanaians joining the mission, the Province of North West Africa was established. The Jesuit priests who settled in Nigeria started the building and construction of Loyola Jesuit College in 1995. Funding to construct the school came from the New York Province of the Society of Jesus and the United States Agency of International Development, Office of American Schools and Hospitals Abroad. The laying of foundation stone took place on 1 April and was presided by the Honorable Walter Carrington, the then United States Ambassador to Nigeria who described the site as a "field of dreams". On October 1996, Loyola Jesuit College was officially opened.

The college had 400 students register for the entrance examination in 1996 and selected 101 for enrollment. In 2005, out of the 2300 candidates who took the entrance examination, 120 were accepted. In a 20 November 2009 analysis by the editor of America John W. Donohue, the school enrolled about 600 boys and girls on a 70-acre campus. He also wrote that as at 2009, out of 54 members of staff, LJC had a mix of Nigerian and Ghanaian staff. With a selection rate of less than 10 percent of applicants annually, Loyola Jesuit College remains the most selective secondary institution in Nigeria.

=== Plane crash and memorial ===
On 10 December 2005, a DC-9, carrying 127 passengers crashed and burned at the Port Harcourt Airport, killing over 107. Sixty-one were students of Loyola Jesuit College, who were traveling back to their various homes for Christmas holiday; only one student Kechi Okwuchi survived the incident. The then president of the college Peter Schineller criticised Nigeria's airline safety record, inadequate communications, lack of ambulances, and bad roads. A new multi-purpose auditorium, Memorial Hall, memorializes the students who died in the crash.

=== Legacy ===
According to The Punch, Loyola Jesuit College produced the best overall results in the West African Examination Council (WAEC) from 2002 to 2005 and also in 2008. It produced the overall best candidate in West Africa in 2005 and 2007 and the best candidate in 2009. It produced the best female candidate and the best overall results in the 2015 WAEC examination. And again produced the best WAEC result in 2019 for a female candidate. In a 2019 report by Vanguard, Loyola Jesuit College and Grundtvig International Secondary School, Oba, among others, received the year's Outstanding Award at the Africa Top Schools Award ceremony. The principal, Stanis Okoye, also won the Outstanding Principal. On 25 February 2025, Loyola Jesuit College's student, Sekibo Tamundodumotein, won the 774-Young Nigerian Scientist Presidential Award (774 YONSPA). This award had previously been won by Loyola Jesuit in 2023. Loyola Jesuit College produced the overall best candidate in JAMB in 2003, 2004, 2009, 2012, 2015 and 2022. It also produced the first perfect score in West Africa in the American College Test (ACT) in 2020, Mezisashe O. Of the three Nigerian Candidates with the highest score of 1590 in the Scholastic Aptitude Test (SAT) in the history of the test in Nigeria, two graduated from LJC, Gregory Ugwi (2003) and Sekibo T. (2025) who also had a perfect score of 36 in the American College Test (2025). The school has maintained the top rank in the country in the WAEC examinations for over 10 years.

== Administration ==
=== Presidents ===
Ordinal	Officeholder	Term start	Term end	Notes
1	Patrick Ryan	1999	2005	
2	Peter Schineller	2005	2007	
3	John-Okoria Ibhakewanlan	2007	2010	
4	Ugo Nweke	August 2010	December 2010	
5	Ehi Omoragbon	2011	2013	
6	Emmanuel Ugwejeh	2013	2018	
7	Peter Chidolue	2018	2024	
7	Ubong Attai	2024	incumbent	

=== Principals ===
Ordinal	Officeholder	Term start	Term end	Notes
1	Jim Kuntz	1996	1999	
2	O.T. Jonah	1999	2003	
3	Marc Roselli	2003	2006	
4	John-Okorie Ibhakewanlan	2006	2010	
5	Ugo Nweke	2010	2012	
6	Emmanuel Ugwejeh	2012	2014	Temporarily held the role of both principal and president from 2013 to 2014.
7	Joe-Stanis Okoye	2014	2019	
8	Chikere Ugwuanyi	2019	2026	
8	Alexander Irechukwu	2026	incumbent	

== Notable alumni ==
- Iyinoluwa Aboyeji – Andela co-founder,
- Emmanuel Bez Idakula – singer, songwriter
- Kechi Okwuchi – one of the two survivors of the Sosoliso Airlines Flight 1145 crash and finalist in the twelfth season of America's Got Talent

== See also ==
- Catholic Church in Nigeria
- Education in Nigeria
- List of Jesuit schools
