= Milpark =

Area of Johannesburg, South Africa

Milpark is an area in Johannesburg, South Africa. It consists of the suburbs of Braamfontein Werf and Sunnyside, Johannesburg along with small parts of neighbouring suburbs like Parktown. Close to both the University of Johannesburg, and University of the Witwatersrand, it is undergoing urban renewal.

== See also ==
- Milpark Hospital
