= Kechi Okwuchi =

Nigerian-American singer and motivational speaker

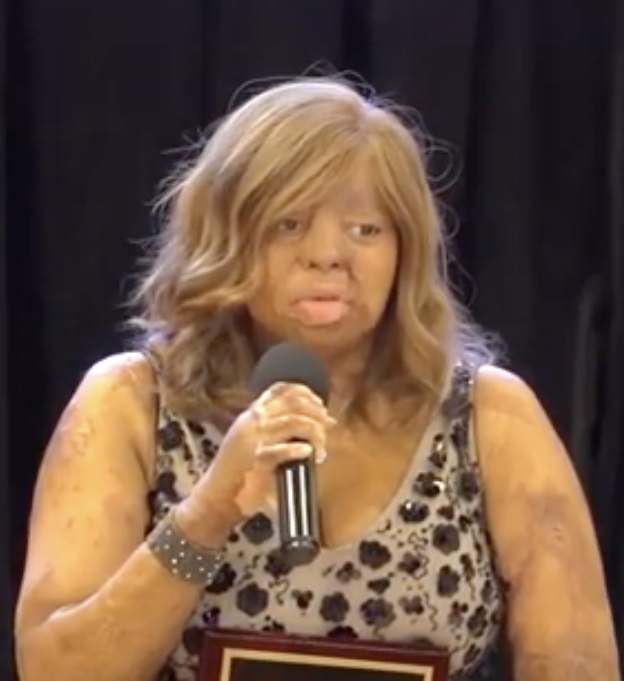
- Born: October 29, 1989 (age 36)
- Known for: America's Got Talent; Sosoliso Airlines Flight 1145 survivor

Kechi Okwuchi (born October 29, 1989) is a Nigerian and American singer and motivational speaker. She was one of the two survivors in the Sosoliso Airlines Flight 1145 crash on December 10, 2005, and a finalist at the twelfth season of America's Got Talent in 2017.

== Sosoliso plane crash ==
Okwuchi was one of the two survivors in the Sosoliso Airlines Flight 1145 crash on December 10, 2005, that claimed 107 lives, 59 of which were her school mates from Loyola Jesuit College. She received third degree burns over 65% of her body and was given a 30% chance of survival.

Okwuchi was air-lifted to Milpark Hospital in Johannesburg, South Africa for immediate medical attention and treatment, and later to Shriners Hospitals for Children in Galveston, Texas, United States where she has undergone over a hundred reconstructive surgeries.

== Life after plane crash ==
In 2015, Okwuchi graduated from the University of Saint Thomas, in Houston, Texas, United States, with a First Class Degree. She was the student speaker at the Commencement Ceremony.

Okwuchi was a speaker at TedxEuston where she gave a talk titled Girls- know thyself. Kechi later went on to take part in the twelfth season of America's Got Talent in 2017 as a singer, and finished the competition as a finalist. She later participated in America's Got Talent: The Champions in 2019, where Simon Cowell gave her the golden buzzer, sending her straight to the final, but in the final she didn't come in the top 5. She has performed at sporting events and other events throughout the United States, South Korea and Nigeria. Okwuchi was chosen to headline Utah's 8th Annual Women of Worth Utah in 2019.

Okwuchi was a participant in an National Institutes of Health and Department of Defense-funded study by the Institute for Exercise and Environmental Medicine and the University of Texas Southwestern Medical Center to develop a Burn Survivor Heat Risk Calculator, which helps burn survivors assess their heat risk during physical activity, offering recommendations based on location, activity level, and surface area of burns.
