= Osaretin Demuren =

Nigerian Banker

- Education: Kiev State University
- Occupation: Banker.
- Years active: 1976–2009
- Spouse: Dr. Harold Demuren
- Relatives: Toolz (Daughter-in-Law)

Osaretin Afusat Demuren is a Nigerian banker, and the first female Chairman of Guaranty Trust Bank.

== Early life and education ==
Demuren attended high school at St. Maria Goretti Girls Grammar School, Benin. She holds a degree in Economics and Statistics from the Moscow Institute of Economics and Statistics and a Diploma in Russian Language and Preliminary Studies from the Kiev State University, Kiev.

== Career ==
She joined central bank in 1976 where she served in several capacity including Trade and Exchange Department and was later deployed to Human Resource Department where she served as director. She retired from banking on 29 December 2009 after 33 years in the industry. She's a member of several professional associations including the Society for Human Resource Management of America, Nigerian Statistical Association, Chartered Institute of Personnel Management of Nigeria and the Chartered Institute of Bankers of Nigeria. She sits on the board of Trust Fund Pensions Plc and of LAPO Microfinance Bank Limited. Demuren joined the Board of Guaranty Trust Bank plc in April 2013 and was announced chairman in 2015.

== Personal life ==
She's married to former Director-General of the Nigerian Civil Aviation Authority, Dr. Harold Demuren. She lists her hobbies as reading and counselling in her local church.
