= Jacques Heim =

French fashion designer (1899–1967)

- Jacques Heim by Willy Maywald, c. 1955
- Born: 8 May 1899; Paris, France
- Died: 8 January 1967 (aged 67); Neuilly-sur-Seine, France
- Occupations: Fashion designer, costume designer
- Known for: Designing for theatre and film
- Children: 2
- Relatives: Jacques Heim (grandson)

Jacques Heim (8 May 1899 – 8 January 1967) was a French fashion designer and costume designer for theater and film, and was a manufacturer of women's furs. From 1930 to his death in 1967, he ran the fashion house (maison de couture) Jacques Heim, which closed in 1969. He was president of the Paris Chambre Syndicale de la haute couture from 1958 to 1962, a period of transition from haute couture to ready-to-wear clothing.

== Early life ==
Jacques Heim was born in Paris. His parents were Isidore and Jeanne Heim, Jews of Polish origin.

== Career ==
In the early 1920s, Heim started working in his parents' fur business, which they had founded in 1898. He took over the business in 1923, and within a year had added a couture department, designing dresses and coats, made with original fabrics, working in collaboration with Sonia Delaunay. In 1930, the workshop became the fashion house Jacques Heim. He also made ready-to-wear and in 1936 started a line for younger women, Heim Jeunes Filles. In 1932, Heim created a two-piece swimsuit consisting of a bra with ruffles and pretty bloomers, which he called the Atome. However, women were not yet ready to reveal their midriff, with only a few daring to wear his swimsuit.

He was harassed during the Nazi occupation of France, but managed to stay in business by putting a non-Jewish "front man" in charge of his fashion house. He was an active member of the French resistance.

In 1946 Heim started a chain of sportswear boutiques. In June 1946, he relaunched his two-piece swimsuit, the Atome, which he advertised as "the world's smallest bathing suit." However, on 5 July 1946, Louis Réard, a French engineer, had a Paris stripper pose before reporters in an even briefer two-piece swimsuit, which Réard called the Bikini, and which he promoted as "smaller than the smallest bathing suit". Réard's design, unlike Heim's, for the first time presented a female swimsuit with the navel exposed. Though financially successful, the bikini was very controversial. Réard's name for the swimsuit caught on, and became the common name for the style of swimwear.

In 1950, Heim launched another ready-to-wear line, Heim Actualité.

Under the presidency of Charles de Gaulle, he was appointed designer of the president's wife, Yvonne de Gaulle. His most prominent clients were Sophia Loren, Queen Fabiola of Belgium, Mamie Eisenhower and actress Gloria Swanson. In 1956, Heim made the bikini an international sensation when Brigitte Bardot wore one of his designs.

Heim served as President of Chambre Syndicale de la Couture Parisienne (Paris Fashion Trade Association) from 1958 to 1962.

== Legacy ==
Heim had a son, Philippe, and a daughter, Arianne. Jacques died in Neuilly-sur-Seine, a suburb of Paris, at age 67. In August 1968, Philippe Heim took over Jacques Heim and all associated companies and stores, but the business was sold in 1969 to French bridalwear concern Henri Michmacher, who owned several boutiques under the name of Pronuptia.

Heim's grandson, also named Jacques Heim, is a choreographer, director of the DIAVOLO | Architecture in Motion, a Los Angeles-based dance company.
