= Evie Clair =

American singer

- Born: Evelyn Clair Abplanalp; December 2, 2003 (age 22); Florence, Arizona
- Genres: Pop
- Occupations: Singer, songwriter
- Instruments: Vocals; piano
- Years active: 2013–present
- Website: evieclair.com

Evelyn Clair Thomas (née Abplanalp; born December 2, 2003) is an American musical artist and reality television personality who appeared on the twelfth season of the talent competition series America's Got Talent.

== Early life ==
Clair is the firstborn daughter and second-born child of Hillary and Amos Abplanalp. Clair has one older brother named Porter, and three younger sisters named Kirra, Ruth and Blakely. Clair also has a step-brother, three step-sisters, and a half-sister named Lucy from her mother's second marriage, all of whom are younger than her. She has been a pianist since she was two years old. On September 8, 2017, the day after Clair advanced to the America's Got Talent finals, it was announced that her father had died from colon cancer. Amos Abplanalp had continued to work at a local prison while being treated for cancer.

Clair and her family are members of The Church of Jesus Christ of Latter Day Saints. On December 17, 2021, she and Clancy Thomas were married. They welcomed their first child, a daughter named Billye Clair Thomas, on April 12, 2023. They welcome their second child, a son named Val Amos Thomas, on March 18, 2026.

== Career ==
Clair began performing in Annie as a tap dancer at the Hale Center Theater in Gilbert southwest of Scottsdale, Arizona at the age of eight. She has sung the national anthem at an Arizona Diamondbacks' game.

=== America's Got Talent ===
Clair auditioned for America's Got Talent three times before getting on the show, auditioning with "Arms" by Christina Perri. She won praise from Perri. After her father's death Clair was offered the opportunity to return the next season, however she chose to stay on course and perform in the finals of season 12. Accommodations were made for her on the program. The woman in charge of wardrobe often bought two skirts for her, ensuring there was enough fabric to create outfits with long skirts in accordance with modesty-focused dress standards which the Church of Jesus Christ of Latter Day Saints has.

=== Album ===
Okay Day

Studio album by Evie Clair
- Released: June 1, 2018
- Genre: Indie pop
- Length: 31:55

On May 23, 2018, an upcoming album by Clair was announced. The album was released on June 1, 2018. All of the songs are performed by Evie Clair except for the song Okay Day which features Kirra L.A, her sister.; Clair sings on the track as well.

==== Track listing ====
No.	Title	Writer(s)	Length
1.	"I Needed You"	Evie Clair	2:46
2.	"Morning Star"	Clair, Clancy Thomas	3:26
3.	"Too Young"	Clair, Thomas	2:53
4.	"Will I Be Enough"	Clair, Steven Moyer	4:23
5.	"Head in the Cloud"	Clair, Moyer	3:36
6.	"Fair Minded"	Clair, Porter Abplanalp	3:11
7.	"One Day"	Clair	3:45
8.	"57 Seconds"	Clair	3:28
9.	"Au Revoir"	Clair, Thomas	3:45
10.	"Okay Day"	Clair	2:42
Total length:			31:55

In 2018, she starred as the headline act in 'The Unbelievables', a Christmas program in Reno, Nevada.
