= Preacher Lawson =

American comedian (born 1991)

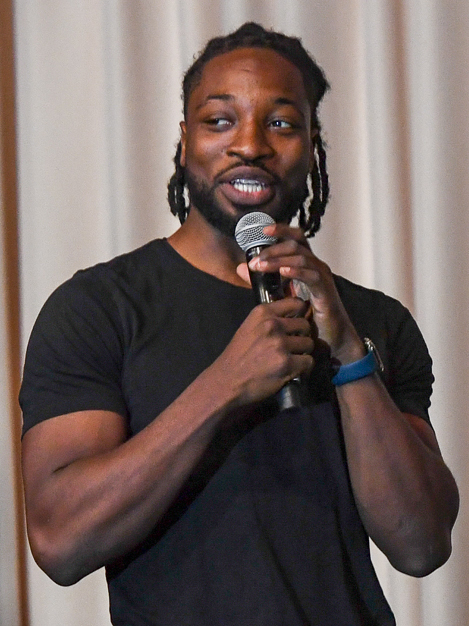
- Lawson in 2021
- Born: March 14, 1991 (age 35); Portland, Oregon, U.S.
- Occupations: Comedian; YouTuber
- Years active: 2010–present
- Height: 6" 4'

Comedy career
- Medium: Stand-up; television
- Genres: Observational comedy; sarcasm; self-deprecation

YouTube information
- Channel: PreacherLawson
- Subscribers: 709 thousand
- Views: 96.1 million
- Last updated: November 15, 2026

Preacher Lawson (born March 14, 1991) is an American comedian. He is known for being a finalist on the 12th season of America's Got Talent. He returned for America's Got Talent: The Champions, where he finished in 5th place overall.

== Early life ==
Preacher Lawson was born in Portland, Oregon, on March 14, 1991. Lawson moved to 20 different locations before he was 10 years old. He lived the longest in Memphis, Tennessee. Lawson started work as a comedian in Orlando, Florida, and considers it to be his hometown. Even in the lowest points of his life (both financially and emotionally), Preacher says that he always remembers how his mother would make living in a car seem like a luxury. Preacher started writing jokes when he was 16 for about a year, then performed for the first time at age 17. He won the 2015 Funniest Comedian In Florida and the 2016 Seattle International Comedy Competition. Between March 2016 and May 2017, Lawson appeared on 4 episodes of Kill Tony (146, 149, 163, 212).

== Career ==
=== 2017: America's Got Talent ===
Lawson appeared on season 12 of America's Got Talent in 2017 and made it through successive elimination rounds, reaching the finals, where he was one of the final 10. He also appeared in that year's America's Got Talent Live! show in Las Vegas that was part of the winner's prize.

=== 2019: AGT & BGT: The Champions ===
Lawson was invited to compete on America's Got Talent: The Champions in 2019. He advanced to the finale after he received the most votes from the superfans of the United States. In the finale, he came in the top 5 and came in 5th place overall. He also competed in Britain's Got Talent: The Champions later in 2019, and advanced through to the final after he received the most votes from the superfans in the audience. He finished in the bottom 7 of the final 10.

=== YouTube career ===
Lawson also runs a YouTube channel, where he posts travel vlogs, vegan and vegetarian cooking guides, and music videos, all with a comedic twist. As of September 2026, his channel has attracted over 95 million views and over 708,000 subscribers. A passionate vegan, Lawson also posts videos discussing the ethical dimensions of his diet. He also used to run a channel named Box Of Chocolates, which was a skit-creating channel.
