= Circus 1903 =

American contemporary circus

Origin
- Country: United States

Information
- Traveling show?: Formerly
- Circus tent?: No
- Website: circus1903.com

Circus 1903 is an American contemporary circus.

Circus 1903 originated as a touring show and in 2017 moved to the Paris Theater at the Paris Las Vegas hotel and casino.
