= Foreign Bodies =

Orchestral composition by Esa-Pekka Salonen

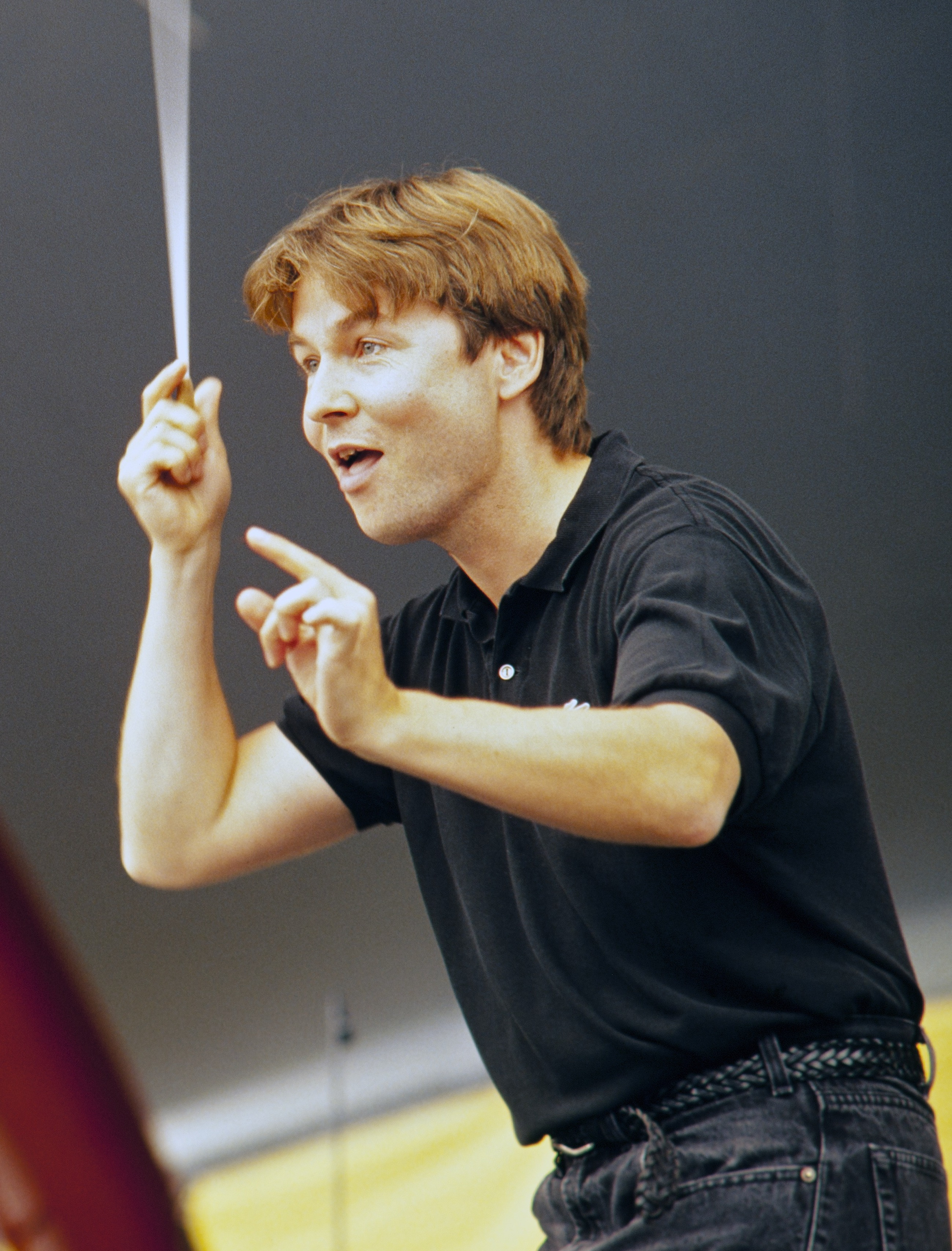
Esa-Pekka Salonen in 1997

Foreign Bodies is an orchestral composition in three movements by the Finnish composer Esa-Pekka Salonen. The work was commissioned by the Finnish Broadcasting Company and was first performed at the Schleswig-Holstein Musik Festival on August 12, 2001 by the Finnish Radio Symphony Orchestra under the conductor Jukka-Pekka Saraste.

== Composition ==
Foreign Bodies has a duration of roughly 20 minutes and is composed in three movements:

1. Body Language
2. Language
3. Dance

=== Instrumentation ===
The work is scored for an orchestra comprising two piccolos (doubling flute and alto flute), two flutes (doubling bass flute), three oboes, cor anglais, three clarinets (doubling E-flat clarinet), bass clarinet, three bassoons, contrabassoon, six horns, three trumpets, three trombones, tuba, timpani, four percussionists, two harps, one keyboardist (on piano and celesta; optional organ), optional 5-string bass guitar and strings.

The first percussionist plays a 5-octave marimba, maracas, 4 temple blocks, 2 wood blocks, and a mark tree. The second plays vibraphone, guiro, and 4 tom-toms. The third plays 3 tam-tams, 6 log drums, a small gong, a crotale in Eb, tubular bells, and 10 large tuned Thai gongs. The fourth plays bass drum, glockenspiel, claves, hi-hat, and a sizzle cymbal.

== Reception ==
Alex Ross of The New Yorker described the composition as "music of muscular, extroverted energy." Stephen Johnson of BBC Music Magazine similarly lauded it as "strongly argued, bursting with energy and full of the kind of ravishing sound-vistas that makes one want to go back and indulge again and again." Mark Swed of the Los Angeles Times praised Foreign Bodies for its "vivid application of orchestral color and the inner clockwork structure" and wrote:

Salonen's Foreign Bodies, a three-movement study in musical physicality for a very large orchestra, has built-in musical viruses. Masses of brass and strings face up against gravity. In the slow movement, weird tuning in the cellos and basses creates new sound worlds. In the last movement the brass undo a dance with their own complicated rhythms.

Arnold Whittall of Gramophone was more critical of the work, however, writing:

Foreign Bodies, with its governing image of nature under threat, is too amorphous to create a genuinely visceral excitement. The short finale – 'Dance' – works best, with some effective rhythmic cross-cutting, but even this grows clotted in texture: it's too reluctant to expose, juxtapose or superimpose its mechanisms in ways which would bring much-needed light and air to the music.
