= America's Got Talent season 12 =

America's Got Talent
- Season 12
- Promotional poster for season 12, featuring (L to R) judges Mandel, Mel B, Cowell, Klum, and host Banks
- Showrunners: Jason Raff; Sam Donnelly
- Hosted by: Tyra Banks
- Judges: Howie Mandel; Mel B; Heidi Klum; Simon Cowell
- Winner: Darci Lynne
- Runner-up: Angelica Hale
- Finals venue: Dolby Theatre
- No. of episodes: 24

Release
- Original network: NBC
- Original release: May 30 – September 20, 2017

Season chronology
- ← Previous; Season 11 Next → Season 13

Judges and Host for America's Got Talent Season 12

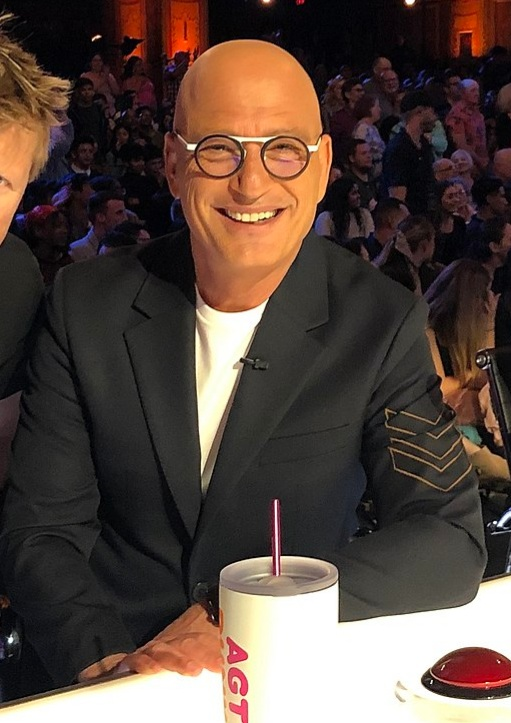
Howie Mandel

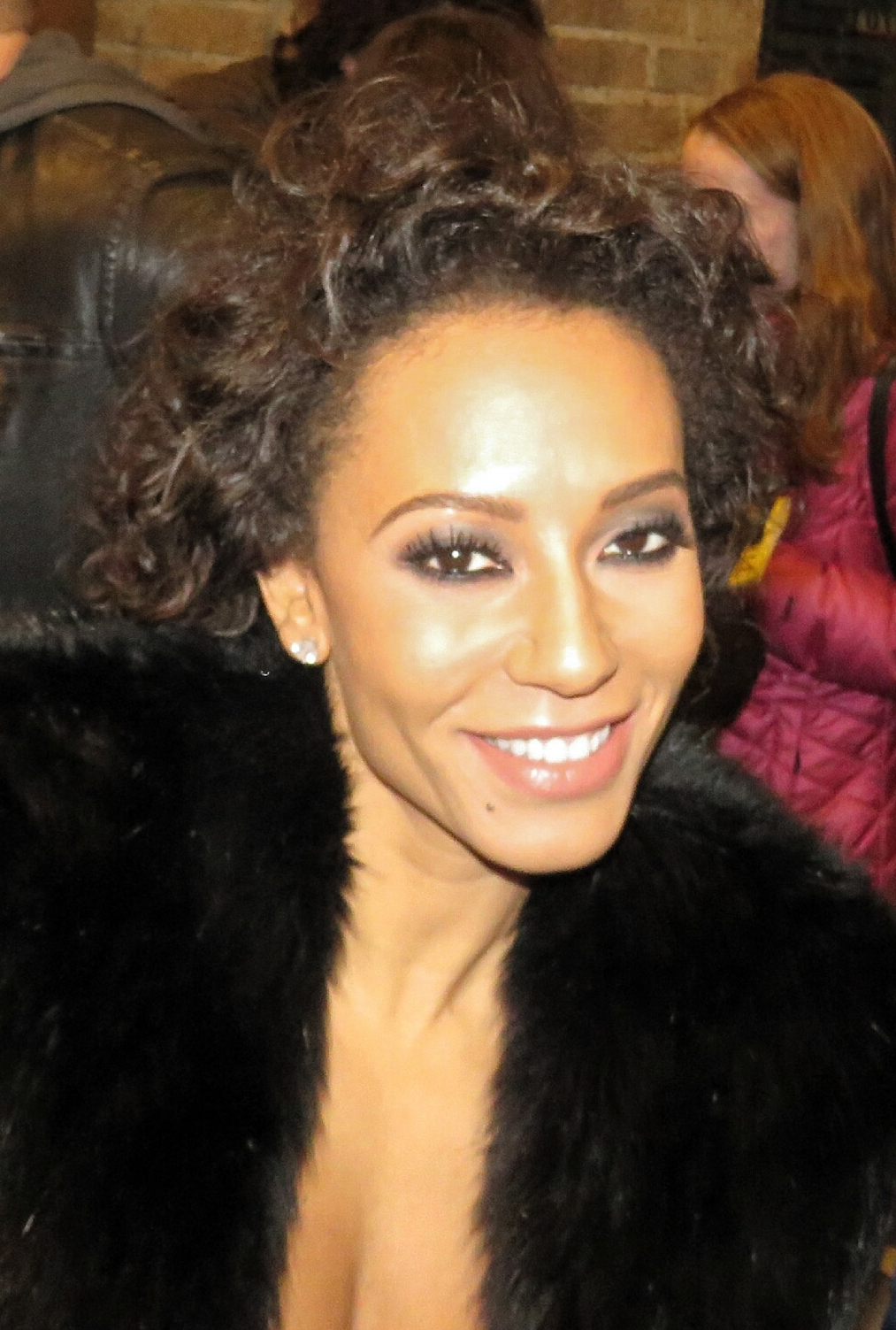
Mel B

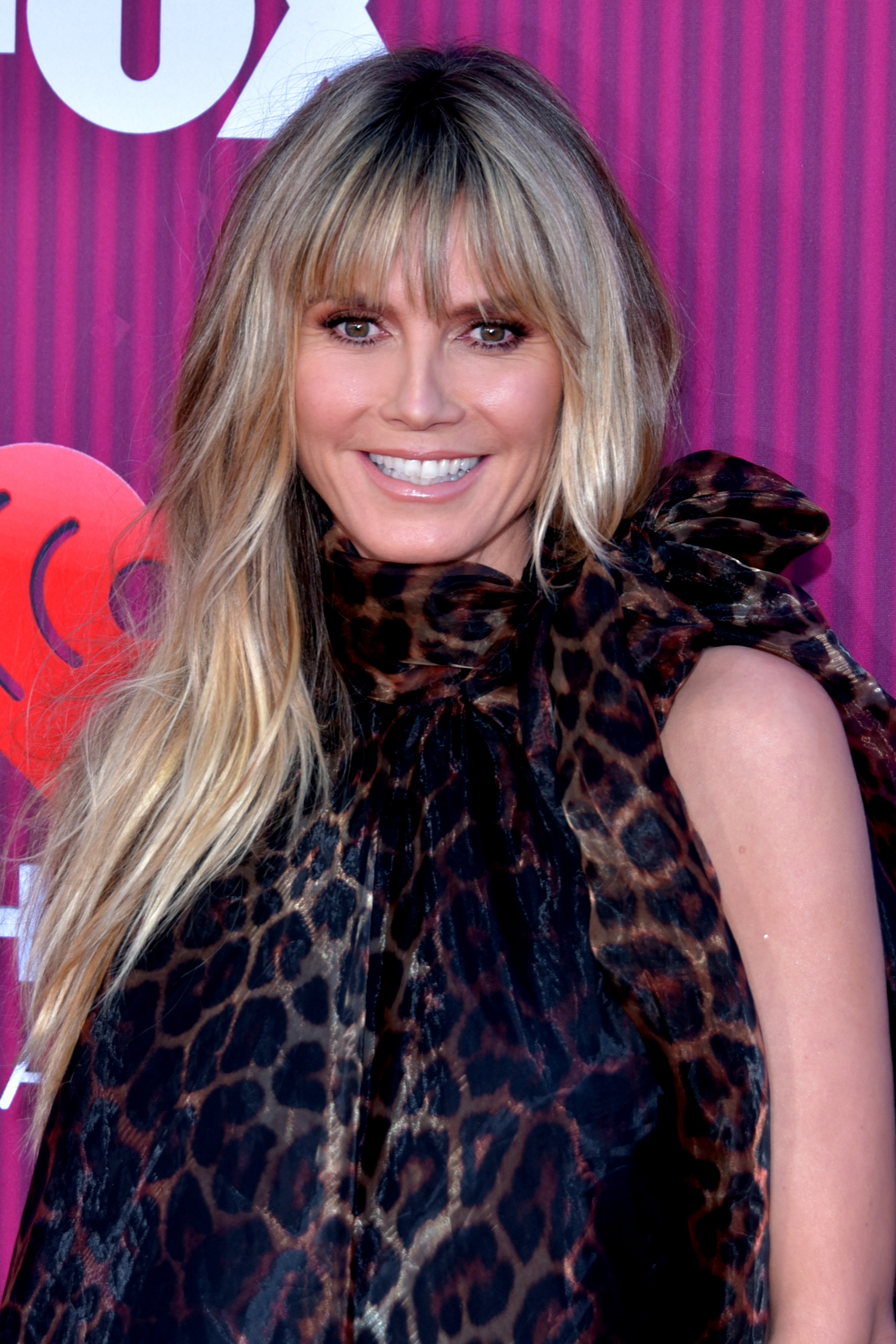
Heidi Klum

Simon Cowell

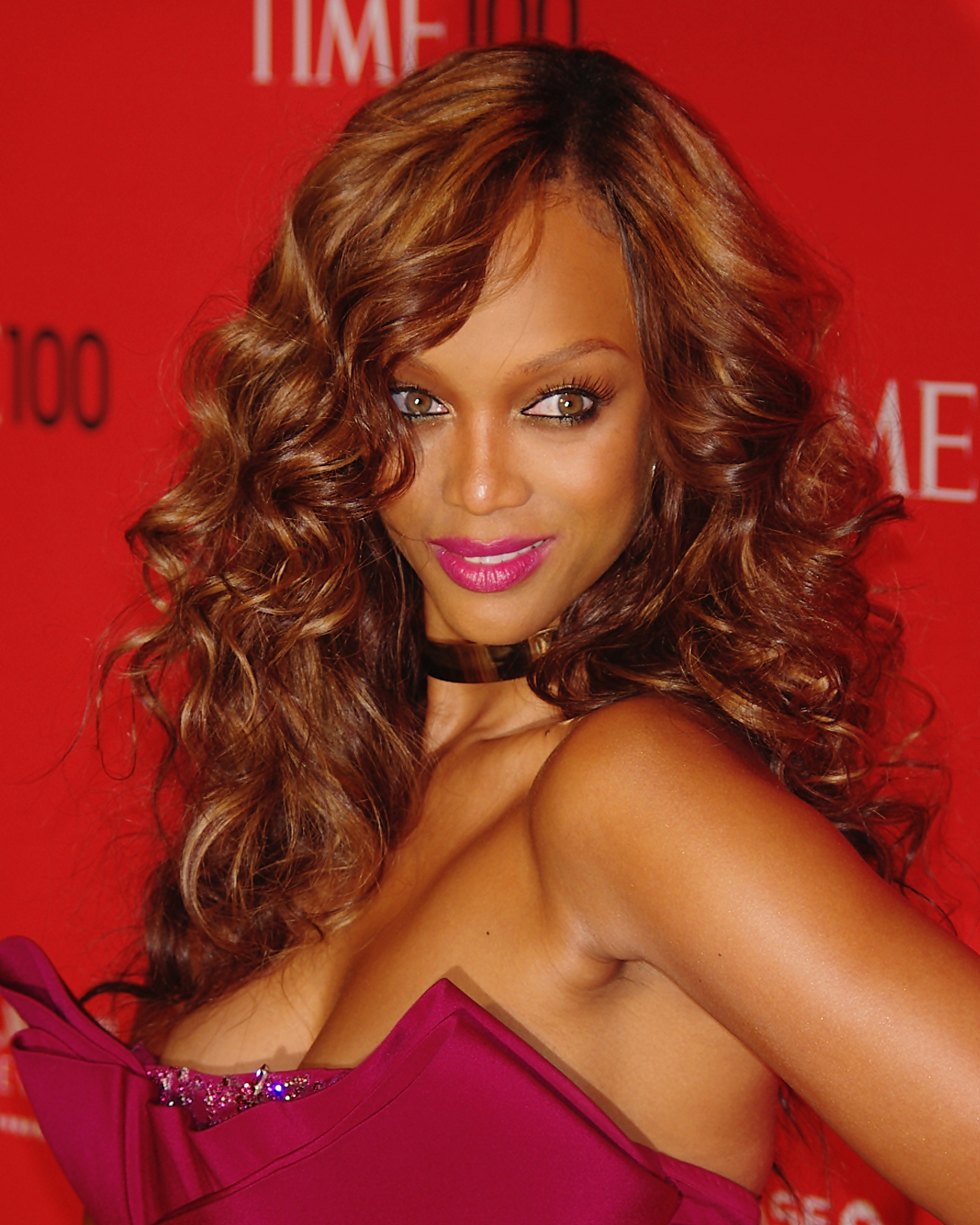
Tyra Banks

The twelfth season of American talent show competition series America's Got Talent was broadcast on NBC from May 30 to September 20, 2017. After the previous season, Nick Cannon ended his involvement with the program after a disagreement with the network, and was replaced as host by Tyra Banks before production of the new season began. The guest judges for this season's Judge Cuts stage included Chris Hardwick, DJ Khaled, Laverne Cox and Seal.

The twelfth season was won by singing ventriloquist Darci Lynne with singer Angelica Hale finishing second, and glow-light dance troupe Light Balance placing third. During its broadcast, the season averaged around 12.66 million viewers, becoming the most watched in the program's history to date. A tribute was included in the season for auditionee Brandon Rogers, who had died three months after originally auditioning for the competition.

== Season overview ==
Open auditions took place in late 2016 within Chicago, Austin, Cleveland, Jacksonville, Philadelphia, Las Vegas, San Diego, New York City, Charleston, Memphis and Los Angeles. Online auditions were also accepted. As with the previous year, the judges' auditions were filmed in March and held at the Pasadena Civic Auditorium in Los Angeles. The Judge Cuts stage of the competition included comedian Chris Hardwick, media personality DJ Khaled, actress Laverne Cox and singer Seal as guest judges. After eight years of hosting, Nick Cannon faced criticism from NBC over a joke he made on his 2017 Showtime comedy special Stand Up, Don't Shoot, which the network deemed as potentially racist. Cannon determined it was best to leave AGT rather than face the possibility of being fired by the network, announcing his resignation from the program on February 13, 2017 (a month before production of the twelfth season began). Although the network would not accept his announcement to begin with (as Cannon was still under contract to host AGT), the network eventually agreed that his decision was the best course of action under the circumstances, and sought to find a replacement before the new season began. On March 12, television personality Tyra Banks was unveiled as the new host, prior to filming commencing.

Of the participants who auditioned for this season, thirty-six secured a place in the live quarter-finals, with twelve quarter-finalists in each one. Among these included: singing ventriloquist Darci Lynne, singer and ukeleleist Mandy Harvey, singer Christian Guardino, glow-light dance troupe Light Balance and singer Angelina Green, who had each received a golden buzzer from the main judges and host; singer Angelica Hale, singer and guitarist Chase Goehring, singer Celine Tam and soul singer Johnny Manuel, who had each received a golden buzzer from the guest judges; vocal group Final Draft, comic daredevil Bello Nock and video-mappers Oskar and Gaspar, who were chosen as Wildcard quarter-finalists. About twenty-two quarter-finalists advanced and split between the two semi-finals, including dog tricks act Pompeyo Family Dogs (chosen as the Wildcard semi-finalist), with ten semi-finalists securing a place in the finals. The table lists the results of each participant's overall performance in the season:

Winner | Runner-up | Third place | Finalist | Semi-finalist
Quarter-finalist | Wildcard Quarter-finalist | Wildcard Semi-finalist
Golden Buzzer - Auditions | Golden Buzzer - Judge Cuts

Participant	Age(s) ^{1}	Genre	Act	From	Quarter-Final	Result
Angelica Hale	10	Singing	Singer	Atlanta	1	Runner-up
Angelina Green	13	Singing	Singer	Miami	3	Eliminated
Artyon & Paige	9 & 8	Dance	Dance Duo	Murrieta, California	1	Eliminated
Bello Nock	47	Danger	Daredevil	Sarasota, Florida	1	Eliminated
Billy & Emily England	30 & 27	Danger	Rollerskating Duo	Las Vegas	1	Semi-finalist
Brobots & Mandroidz	16-24	Dance	Dance Group	Torrance, California	2	Eliminated
Celine Tam	9	Singing	Singer	Hong Kong	2	Semi-finalist
Chase Goehring	21	Singing / Music	Singer & Guitarist	Nolensville, Tennessee	3	Finalist
Christian Guardino	17	Singing	Singer	Patchogue, New York	1	Semi-finalist
Colin Cloud	30	Magic	Mentalist	Edinburgh, Scotland	3	Semi-finalist
DaNell Daymon & Greater Works	24-59	Singing	Gospel Choir	Various ^{2}	3	Semi-finalist
Darci Lynne	12	Comedy / Singing	Singing Ventriloquist	Oklahoma City, Oklahoma	1	Winner
Demian Aditya	36	Danger	Escape Artist	Jakarta, Indonesia	2	Eliminated
Diavolo	21-39	Acrobatics / Dance	Acrobatic Group	Los Angeles	3	Finalist
Eric Jones	36	Magic	Magician	Philadelphia	2	Semi-finalist
Evie Clair	13	Singing / Music	Singer & Pianist	Florence, Arizona	2	Finalist
Final Draft	22-26	Singing	Vocal Group	Atlanta	3	Eliminated
In The Stairwell	18-22	Singing	A Cappella Group	Colorado Springs, Colorado	1	Semi-finalist
Johnny Manuel	32	Singing	Singer	Flint, Michigan	2	Semi-finalist
Junior & Emily Alabi	31 & 27	Dance	Salsa Duo	Los Angeles	3	Eliminated
Just Jerk	18-27	Dance	Dance Group	Seoul, South Korea	1	Eliminated
Kechi Okwuchi	27	Singing	Singer	Houston	3	Finalist
Light Balance	22-36	Dance	Light-Up Dance Group	Dnipro, Ukraine	2	Third place
Mandy Harvey	29	Singing / Music	Singer & Ukulelist	St. Cloud, Florida	2	Grand-finalist
Merrick Hanna	12	Dance	Dancer	Encinitas, California	2	Semi-finalist
Mike Yung	56	Singing	Singer	New York City	3	Semi-finalist
Mirror Image	16	Singing / Dance	Vocal Duo	Pittsburgh	2	Eliminated
Oscar Hernandez	34	Dance	Dancer	Orange County, California	3	Eliminated
Oskar & Gaspar	—N/a ^{3}	Variety	Videomapping Act	Lisbon, Portugal	3	Eliminated
Pompeyo Family Dogs	7-35 ^{4}	Animal	Dog Act	Sarasota	2	Semi-finalist
Preacher Lawson	25	Comedy	Comedian	Memphis, Tennessee	1	Finalist
Puddles Pity Party	52	Singing	Singer	Atlanta	1	Eliminated
Sara & Hero	22 & 5 ^{5}	Animals	Dog Act	North Bay, Ontario	3	Grand-finalist
The Masqueraders	72-74	Singing	Vocal Trio	Nashville	2	Eliminated
The Singing Trump	56	Singing	Singing Donald Trump Impersonator	Palm Springs, California	1	Eliminated
Yoli Mayor	21	Singing	Singer	Miami	1	Semi-finalist

- ^1 Ages denoted for a participant(s), pertain to their final performance for this season.
- ^2 Locations for members of this group were not disclosed on the program.
- ^3 The ages of these participants were not disclosed on the program.
- ^4 The age denoted here pertains to the owner of the dogs in this act; the age range for the animal group was not disclosed by their owner.
- ^5 Sara & Hero involved a second dog in their live round performances; the latter value denotes the age of the dog Hero only.

=== Quarter-finals summary ===
Buzzed Out | Judges' choice | Advanced to Semi-finals
Won Online Public Vote | Won Judges' Vote | Lost Judges' Vote

==== Quarter-final 1 (August 15) ====
Guest Performers, Results Show: Grace VanderWaal

Quarter-Finalist	Order	Buzzes and Judges' votes				Result (August 16)
Quarter-Finalist	Order	Cowell	Klum	Mel B	Mandel	Result (August 16)
Christian Guardino	1					Advanced (Online Public Vote)
Artyon & Paige	2					Eliminated
In The Stairwell	3					Advanced
The Singing Trump	4					Eliminated
Angelica Hale	5					Advanced
Bello Nock	6					Eliminated
Just Jerk	7					Eliminated (Judges' Vote Tied - Lost by Public Vote)
Puddles Pity Party	8					Eliminated
Preacher Lawson	9					Advanced
Yoli Mayor	10					Advanced (Judges' Vote Tied - Won by Public Vote)
Billy & Emily England	11					Advanced
Darci Lynne	12					Advanced

==== Quarter-final 2 (August 22) ====
Guest Performers, Results Show: Circus 1903

Quarter-Finalist	Order	Buzzes and Judges' votes				Result (August 23)
Quarter-Finalist	Order	Cowell	Klum	Mel B	Mandel	Result (August 23)
Brobots & Mandroidz	1					Eliminated
Celine Tam	2					Advanced
Mirror Image	3					Eliminated
Johnny Manuel	4					Advanced
Merrick Hanna	5					Advanced
Eric Jones	6					Advanced (Judges' Vote Tied - Won by Public Vote)
The Masqueraders	7					Eliminated (Judges' Vote Tied - Lost by Public Vote)
Light Balance ^{6}	8					Advanced
Evie Clair	9					Advanced (Online Public Vote)
Demian Aditya ^{7}	10					Eliminated
Pompeyo Family Dogs ^{8}	11					Eliminated
Mandy Harvey	12					Advanced

- ^6 Due to a technical issue, Light Balance's performance was based on their earlier dress rehearsal for the quarter-final.
- ^7 Demain Aditya's performance suffered from technical difficulties during the live broadcast, due to a fault in the participant's equipment for his routine.
- ^8 Pompeyo Family Dogs were later appointed as the judges' WildCard semi-finalists.

==== Quarter-final 3 (August 29) ====
Guest Performers, Results Show: Mat Franco, Piff the Magic Dragon, and Jon Dorenbos

Quarter-Finalist	Order	Buzzes and Judges' votes				Result (August 30)
Quarter-Finalist	Order	Cowell	Klum	Mel B	Mandel	Result (August 30)
DaNell Daymon & Greater Works	1					Advanced (Won Judges' Vote)
Junior & Emily Alabi	2					Eliminated
Final Draft	3					Eliminated
Oscar Hernandez	4					Eliminated
Angelina Green	5					Eliminated (Lost Judges' Vote)
Colin Cloud	6					Advanced (Online Public Vote)
Mike Yung	7					Advanced
Oskar & Gaspar	8					Eliminated
Sara and Hero	9					Advanced
Chase Goehring	10					Advanced
Diavolo	11					Advanced
Kechi Okwuchi	12					Advanced

=== Semi-finals summary ===
Buzzed Out | Judges' choice | Advanced to Finals
Won Online Public Vote | Won Judges' Vote | Lost Judges' Vote

==== Semi-final 1 (September 5–6) ====
Guest Performers, Results Show: The Clairvoyants

Semi-Finalist	Order	Buzzes and Judges' votes				Result (September 6)
Semi-Finalist	Order	Cowell	Klum	Mel B	Mandel	Result (September 6)
Yoli Mayor	1					Eliminated
Eric Jones	2					Eliminated (Lost Judges' Vote)
DaNell Daymon & Greater Works	3					Eliminated
Preacher Lawson	4					Advanced
Johnny Manuel	5					Eliminated
Billy & Emily England	6					Eliminated
Evie Clair	7					Advanced (Online Public Vote)
Sara & Hero	8					Advanced
Chase Goehring	9					Advanced (Won Judges' Vote)
Darci Lynne	10					Advanced
Mike Yung	11					Eliminated

==== Semi-final 2 (September 12) ====
Guest Performers, Results Show: Absinthe

Semi-Finalist	Order	Buzzes and Judges' votes				Result (September 13)
Semi-Finalist	Order	Cowell	Klum	Mel B	Mandel	Result (September 13)
Celine Tam	1					Eliminated
Colin Cloud	2		^{9}			Eliminated (Lost Judges' Vote)
Christian Guardino	3					Eliminated
In the Stairwell	4					Eliminated
Merrick Hanna	5					Eliminated
Mandy Harvey	6					Advanced
Pompeyo Family Dogs	7					Eliminated
Diavolo	8		^{9}			Advanced (Won Judges' Vote)
Kechi Okwuchi	9					Advanced (Online Public Vote)
Light Balance	10					Advanced
Angelica Hale	11					Advanced

- ^9 Due to the majority vote for Diavolo, Klum's voting intention was not revealed.

=== Finals (September 19–20) ===
Winner | Runner-up | 3rd place | Top 5

Finalist	Performed with (2nd Performance)	Result (September 20)
Angelica Hale	Kelly Clarkson ^{10}	2nd
Chase Goehring	James Arthur	Finalist
Darci Lynne	Terry Fator	1st
Diavolo	N/A	Finalist
Evie Clair	James Arthur	Finalist
Kechi Okwuchi	Kelly Clarkson ^{10}	Finalist
Light Balance	Derek Hough	3rd
Mandy Harvey	Shania Twain	Grand-finalist
Preacher Lawson	N/A	Finalist
Sara & Hero	N/A	Grand-finalist

- ^10 Angelica Hale and Kechi Okwuchi conducted a joint routine for their second performance, and thus shared the same guest performers.

== Ratings ==
The following ratings are based upon those published by Nielsen Media Research after this season's broadcast:

Show	Episode title	First air date	Timeslot (EDT)	Rating (18–49)	Share (18–49)	Viewers (millions)	Nightly Rank	Weekly Rank
1	Auditions Week 1	May 30, 2017	Tuesday; 8:00 p.m.	2.7	11	12.32	1	3
2	Auditions Week 2	June 6, 2017	Tuesday; 8:00 p.m.	2.7	11	12.53	1	3
3	Auditions Week 3	June 13, 2017	Tuesday; 8:00 p.m.	2.6	11	12.70	1	2
4	Auditions Week 4	June 20, 2017	Tuesday; 8:00 p.m.	2.6	11	12.74	1	1
5	Auditions Week 5	June 27, 2017	Tuesday; 8:00 p.m.	2.5	10	12.36	1	1
6	Auditions Week 6	July 11, 2017	Tuesday; 8:00 p.m.	2.5	10	12.59	1	1
7	Judge Cuts 1	July 18, 2017	Tuesday; 8:00 p.m.	2.5	11	12.57	1	1
8	Judge Cuts 2	July 25, 2017	Tuesday; 8:00 p.m.	2.6	11	13.08	1	1
9	Judge Cuts 3	August 1, 2017	Tuesday; 8:00 p.m.	2.8	12	13.33	1	1
10	Judge Cuts 4	August 8, 2017	Tuesday; 8:00 p.m.	2.7	11	13.32	1	1
11	Quarterfinals, Week 1 (Performances)	August 15, 2017	Tuesday; 8:00 p.m.	2.8	11	13.44	1	1
12	Quarterfinals, Week 1 (Results)	August 16, 2017	Wednesday 8:00 p.m.	2.1	9	10.89	1	2
13	Quarterfinals, Week 2 (Performances)	August 22, 2017	Tuesday 8:00 p.m.	2.6	10	12.76	1	1
14	Quarterfinals, Week 2 (Results)	August 23, 2017	Wednesday 8:00 p.m.	2.0	9	10.84	1	2
15	Quarterfinals, Week 3 (Performances)	August 29, 2017	Tuesday 8:00 p.m.	2.6	11	13.13	1	2
16	Quarterfinals, Week 3 (Results)	August 30, 2017	Wednesday 8:00 p.m.	1.9	8	11.07	1	3
17	Semifinals, Week 1 (Performances)	September 5, 2017	Tuesday 8:00 p.m.	2.6	10	13.29	1	3
18	Semifinals, Week 1 (Results)	September 6, 2017	Wednesday 8:00 p.m.	2.1	8	11.99	1	6
19	Semifinals, Week 2 (Performances)	September 12, 2017	Tuesday 9:00 p.m.	2.3	9	11.57	1	3
20	Semifinals, Week 2 (Results)	September 13, 2017	Wednesday 8:00 p.m.	2.1	8	11.59	1	2
21	The Finals	September 19, 2017	Tuesday 8:00 p.m.	3.0	12	14.70	1	4
22	Season Finale	September 20, 2017	Wednesday 8:00 p.m.	3.0	11	15.64	1	2

Specials

Show	Episode title	First air date	Timeslot (EDT)	Rating (18–49)	Share (18–49)	Viewers (millions)	Nightly Rank	Weekly Rank
S1	Best of Season 12 Auditions	July 13, 2017	Thursday 8:00 p.m.	1.3	6	7.10	2	10
S2	Road to Finals	August 9, 2017	Wednesday 8:00 p.m.	1.3	6	7.01	2	8

== Incident ==
During the season, the show paid tribute to American physician Brandon Rogers, who auditioned for a place in the competition, but died on June 11, 2017, three months after he originally auditioned. His performance was not shown by producers during the audition episodes, as it was felt unwise to do so without consent from his family, but was later aired as a tribute during the Judge Cuts episode that was broadcast on July 11.
