= Afrijet Airlines =

Nigerian airline

IATA	ICAO	Call sign
6F	FRJ	AFRIJET
- Founded: 1999
- Ceased operations: 2009
- Hubs: Murtala Muhammed International Airport
- Fleet size: 1
- Headquarters: NAHCO Building; Murtala Muhammed International Airport; Ikeja, Nigeria
- Key people: Colin Carr (owner)

Afrijet Airlines was an airline with its head office in the NAHCO Building on the grounds of Murtala Muhammed International Airport in Ikeja, Nigeria. It was established and started regional cargo operations in 1999. Its main base was Murtala Mohammed International Airport.

== History ==
As well as operating cargo services from Nigeria, the airline also operated high-profile security flight operations in the Democratic Republic of Congo. The airline later moved from its offices at Murtala Mohammed International Airport to its corporate headquarters in Opebi, Lagos. It still maintains an aviation maintenance shop with its sister company Elite Aviation.

The Nigerian government set a deadline of April 30, 2007 for all airlines operating in the country to re-capitalize or be grounded, in an effort to ensure better services and safety. The airline satisfied the Nigerian Civil Aviation Authority's criteria in terms of re-capitalization and was re-registered for operation. However, in 2009, Afrijet Airlines was shut down.
