= LAPO Microfinance Bank =

Nigerian microfinance bank

LAPO Microfinance Bank (also known as LAPO MfB) is a Nigerian microfinance bank headquartered in Lagos State, Nigeria. It operates with a national microfinance bank licence from the Central Bank of Nigeria (CBN). The bank is part of the wider Lift Above Poverty Organisation (LAPO) group founded by Godwin Eseiwi Ehigiamusoe.

== History ==
LAPO originated as a non-profit initiative in the late 1980s to improve access to credit for low-income Nigerians. The NGO was formalised in 1987. The bank's roots include an earlier community-bank phase in the 1990s. LAPO Microfinance Bank Limited was incorporated in 2007, licensed by the CBN as a state microfinance bank in 2010, and upgraded to a national microfinance bank in 2012 under the CBN's revised microfinance policy.

To diversify funding, the group established LAPO MFB SPV PLC and accessed Nigeria's domestic debt market. Notable listings include a ₦3.15 billion bond admitted to FMDQ in March 2018 and a ₦6.2 billion, 13% fixed-rate Series II bond listed in July 2020; subsequent programme updates and status reports have been published by the exchanges and regulators.

== Operations and services ==
LAPO MfB provides microcredit and savings products aimed at low-income households, traders, and micro/small businesses, alongside specialised products and delivery via branch and agent networks. During COVID-19 restrictions, the bank leveraged agent banking to sustain basic services, according to a World Bank Group report. As of 2021, the IFC described LAPO as operating hundreds of outlets and serving hundreds of thousands of clients across Nigeria.

In H1 2023, BusinessDay reported that LAPO MfB disbursed ₦74 billion to SMEs as part of efforts to expand access to credit.
