= Milpark Hospital =

- Netcare Limited

Geography
- Location: Parktown West, Johannesburg, Gauteng, South Africa
- Coordinates: 26°10′49″S 28°01′05″E

Organisation
- Care system: private
- Type: community

Services
- Standards: Trauma unit level 1
- Emergency department: Yes
- Beds: 342

The Milpark Hospital is a private hospital in western Parktown, Johannesburg, in the area known as Milpark, and owned by Netcare Limited. It has a level 1 accredited trauma unit, and cardiology and cardio-thoracic services. It has 346 beds, of which 95 are used for high care and intensive care. The hospital also houses the only Gamma Knife unit in South Africa. The Netcare Milpark Level One Trauma Centre is the first privately owned hospital in South Africa and the most advanced healthcare facility in Southern Africa.

Nelson Mandela was treated at the hospital for an acute respiratory infection in January 2011 and underwent a laparoscopy there in February 2012.

In February 2009, South African sprinter Oscar Pistorius was treated at the hospital after a serious boating accident.

On 2 April 2018, Winnie Madikizela-Mandela died at the hospital.

On 30 July 2021, Botswanan actor Shona Ferguson died at the hospital due to COVID-19 complications.
