= Nigerian Civil Aviation Authority =

Government agency

The Nigerian Civil Aviation Authority (NCAA) is the civil aviation authority of Nigeria.

As of 2014 the Director General of NCAA is Captain Muhktar Usman. Capt. Musa Shuaibu Nuhu was Director General till December 2023. Capt. Chris Najomo is the current Director-General.

== Offices ==
Its head office (Corporate Headquarters) is located on the grounds of Nnamdi Azikiwe International Airport in the national capital of Nigeria, Abuja. It has regional offices in the Murtala Muhammed International Airport in Ikeja Lagos State, also acting as the Operational Headquarters of the agency, Port Harcourt International Airport in Port Harcourt, and in Kano.
