= Corn stalk =

"Corn stalk" or "Cornstalk" may refer to:

- The stem of a maize plant
- Dracaena fragrans or cornstalk dracaena, a flowering plant
- Cornstalk (Shawnee leader), a Shawnee Indian chief during the American Revolution (1720–1777)
- Cornstalk, West Virginia, an unincorporated community
- Cornstalk Publishing, now part of Angus & Robertson
- Corn Stalk Defense, a chess opening defense in the King's Pawn Game

== See also ==
- Chief Cornstalk Wildlife Management Area
- Cornstalk fiddle, a traditional toy
- Cornstalk Heights, a neighborhood in Harriman, Tennessee, United States
- Gurin Central Mosque, sometimes called the Corn-stalk Mosque
- Stalk (disambiguation)
