= Masjid Al-Ansar Islamic Community Center =

Sunni mosque in Minnesota, US

Coordinates: 45.0448°N 93.3296°W

Masjid Al-Ansar Community Center
- Location of the mosque in Minnesota

Religion
- Affiliation: Sunni Islam
- Ecclesiastical or organizational status: Mosque
- Leadership: Imam Mohamed Dukuly
- Status: Active

Location
- Location: Brooklyn Center, Minnesota
- Country: United States
- Interactive map of Masjid Al-Ansar Community Center

Architecture
- Type: Mosque architecture
- Completed: 2022

The Masjid Al-Ansar Islamic Community Center is a Sunni Islam mosque located in Brooklyn Center, Minnesota, just outside Minneapolis, in the United States.

The current mosque building was opened in 2022. The chief Imam of the mosque is Imam Mohamed Dukuly, a prominent Imam in Minnesota and a native of Liberia. Most of the congregation of the mosque are West African Muslims, majority from Liberia, and large minorities from Guinea and Sierra Leone. The mosque offers Islamic education, including learning the Quran.

== See also ==
- Islam in the United States
- List of mosques in the United States
