= Maiduguri Central Mosque =

Mosque in Maiduguri, Borno, Nigeria

- Masallacin Juma'a Maiduguri
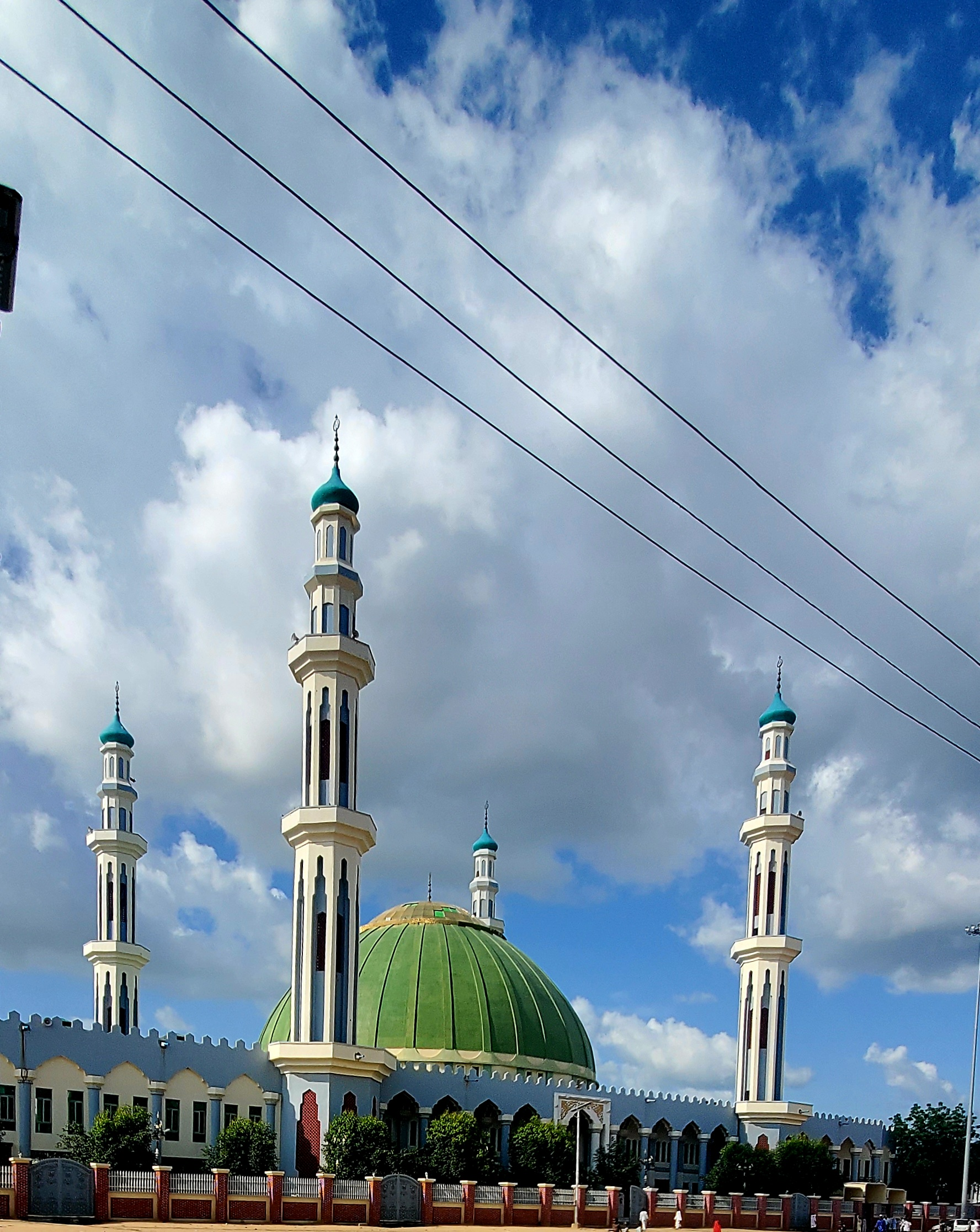

- Location of the mosque in Nigeria

Religion
- Affiliation: Sunni Islam
- Ecclesiastical or organizational status: Friday mosque
- Leadership: Shehu of Borno
- Status: Active

Location
- Location: Maiduguri, Borno State
- Country: Nigeria
- Interactive map of Maiduguri Central Mosque
- Coordinates: 11°50′54″N 13°09′34″E

Architecture
- Type: Mosque
- Completed: 1918

Specifications
- Dome: 2 (maybe more)
- Minaret: 4 (maybe more)

The Maiduguri Central Mosque is the main Friday mosque in Maiduguri, the capital of Borno State, Nigeria. The mosque serves as a major religious, cultural, and social center for the Muslim community in the region.

== History ==
Maiduguri has been a center of Islamic civilization for centuries, particularly under the Kanem-Bornu Empire and later the Borno Emirate. The mosque is closely associated with the Shehu of Borno, the traditional ruler of the region, who leads prayers on important religious occasions.

Large congregations gather at the mosque every Friday for Jumu'ah (Friday prayers) and for Eid Celebrations. The mosque serves as an Islamic education center for Qur'anic recitation, Islamic teachings, and jurisprudence and as a venue for religious lectures, naming ceremonies, and other communal activities.

== Architecture ==
The mosque features traditional and modern Islamic architectural styles, including a prayer hall, minarets, large domes with intricate Islamic designs, a sahn, and inscriptions that feature Arabic calligraphy and traditional Kanuri architectural influences.

== See also ==
- Islam in Nigeria
- List of mosques in Nigeria
