= Ijazah =

License authorizing its holder to transmit a certain text or subject in Islam

An ijazah (Arabic: الإِجازَة, "permission", "authorization", "license"; plural: ijazahs or ijazat) is a license authorizing its holder to transmit a certain text or subject, which is issued by someone already possessing such authority. It is particularly associated with transmission of Islamic religious knowledge. The license usually implies that the student has acquired this knowledge from the issuer of the ijaza through first-hand oral instruction, although this requirement came to be relaxed over time. An ijaza providing a chain of authorized transmitters going back to the original author often accompanied texts of hadith, fiqh and tafsir; but also appeared in mystical, historical, and philological works, as well as literary collections. While the ijaza is primarily associated with Sunni Islam, the concept also appears in the hadith traditions of Twelver Shia.

George Makdisi, professor of oriental studies, theorized that the ijazah was the origin of the university academic degree as well as the doctorate. Professor of Arabic, Alfred Guillaume (SOAS); Professor of Sociology, Syed Farid al-Attas (National University of Singapore) Professor of Middle Eastern Studies, Devin J. Stewart (Emory University) agree that there is a resemblance between the ijazah and the university degree. However, Toby Huff and others reject Makdisi's theory. Devin J. Stewart notes a difference in the granting authority (individual professor for the ijazah and a corporate entity in the case of the university).

== Description ==
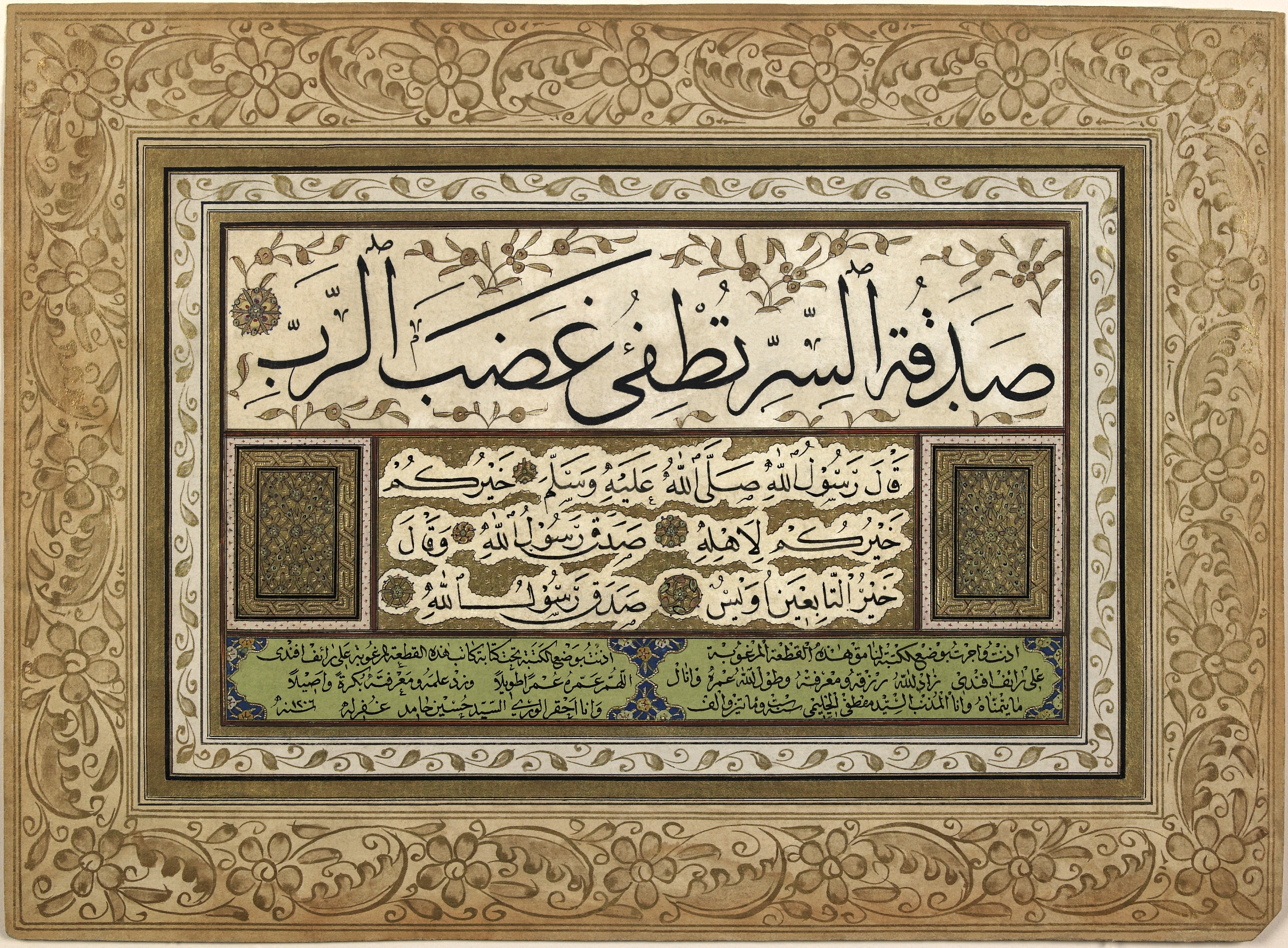
An ijazah certifying competency in calligraphy, 1206 AH/1791 AD.

In a paper titled Traditionalism in Islam: An Essay in Interpretation, Harvard professor William A. Graham explains the ijazah system as follows:

The basic system of "the journey in search of knowledge" that developed early in Hadith scholarship, involved travelling to specific authorities (shaykhs), especially the oldest and most renowned of the day, to hear from their own mouths their hadiths and to obtain their authorization or "permission" (ijazah) to transmit those in their names. This ijazah system of personal rather than institutional certification has served not only for Hadith, but also for transmission of texts of any kind, from history, law, or philology to literature, mysticism, or theology. The isnad of a long manuscript as well as that of a short hadith ideally should reflect the oral, face-to-face, teacher-to-student transmission of the text by the teacher's ijazah, which validates the written text. In a formal, written ijazah, the teacher granting the certificate typically includes an isnad containing his or her scholarly lineage of teachers back to the Prophet through Companions, a later venerable shaykh, or the author of a specific book.

== Hypothesis on origins of doctorate ==
According to the Lexikon des Mittelalters and A History of the University in Europe, the origin of the European doctorate lies in high medieval teaching with its roots going back to late antiquity and the early days of Christian teaching of the Bible. This view does not suggest any link between the ijazah and the doctorate. George Makdisi has instead stated that the ijazah was a type of academic degree or doctorate issued in medieval madrasahs, similar to that which later appeared in European medieval universities. Devin J. Stewart also sees a parallel, and asserts that "the license to teach law and issue legal opinions was clearly an actual document of official or legal standing," while also noting a difference in the granting authority (individual professor for the ijzazah and a corporate entity in the case of the university). The theory of an Islamic origin of the degree was originally proposed in the 1930s by Alfred Guillaume, who cited the ijazah as a precursor to the licentia docendi, which Syed Farid al-Attas agrees with.

Makdisi, in a 1970 investigation into the differences between the Christian university and the Islamic madrasah, was initially of the opinion that the Christian doctorate of the medieval university was the one element in the university that was the most different from the Islamic ijazah certification. In 1989, though, he said that the origins of the Christian medieval doctorate ("licentia docendi") date to the ijāzah al-tadrīs wa al-iftā' ("license to teach and issue legal opinions") in the medieval Islamic legal education system. Makdisi proposed that the ijazat attadris was the origin of the European doctorate, and went further in suggesting an influence upon the magisterium of the Christian Church. According to the 1989 paper, the ijazat was equivalent to the Doctor of Laws qualification and was developed during the ninth century after the formation of the Madh'hab legal schools. To obtain a doctorate, a student "had to study in a guild school of law, usually four years for the basic undergraduate course" and at least ten years for a post-graduate course. The "doctorate was obtained after an oral examination to determine the originality of the candidate's theses," and to test the student's "ability to defend them against all objections, in disputations set up for the purpose" which were scholarly exercises practiced throughout the student's "career as a graduate student of law." After students completed their post-graduate education, they were awarded doctorates giving them the status of faqih (meaning "master of law"), mufti (meaning "professor of legal opinions") and mudarris (meaning "teacher"), which were later translated into Latin as magister, professor and doctor respectively.

Madrasas issued the ijazat attadris in the Islamic religious law of Sharia, mathematics, astrology, medicine, pharmacology, and philosophy. Though Sharia Law was the major subject at most of these madrasas the sciences were treated with the same value in Islamicate society, as many discoveries were made in fields such as medicine where the first hospital was invented and pulmonary blood flow was discovered. The Islamic law degree in Al-Azhar University, the most prestigious madrasa, was traditionally granted without final examinations, but on the basis of the students' attentive attendance to courses. However, the postgraduate doctorate in law was only obtained after "an oral examination." In a 1999 paper, Makdisi points out that, in much the same way granting the ijazah degree was in the hands of professors, the same was true for the early period of the University of Bologna, where degrees were originally granted by professors. He also points out that, much like the ijazat attadris was confined to law, the first degrees at Bologna were also originally confined to law, before later extending to other subjects.

However, several other scholars have criticized Makdisi's work. Norman Daniel, in a 1984 paper, criticized an earlier work of Makdisi for relying on similarities between the two education systems rather than citing historical evidence for a transmission. He stated that Makdisi "does not seriously consider the spontaneous recurrence of phenomena", and notes that similarities between two systems do not automatically imply that one has created the other. He further states that there is a lack of evidence for schools in the short-lived Arab settlements of France and mainland Italy, which Makdisi argues may have been links between the Islamic and European educational systems, as well as a lack of evidence of the alleged transmission of scholastic ideas between the two systems altogether. In a discussion of Makdisi's 1989 thesis, Toby Huff argued that there was never any equivalent to the bachelor's degree or doctorate in the Islamic madrasahs, owing to the lack of a faculty teaching a unified curriculum.

== Differences between an ijazah and a diploma ==
The Western form of education is widely adopted today and used throughout the globe. This education system draws particular attention to a formal educational institution – the university. Groups of individuals are taught by a faculty composed of many professors, each recognized as experts in their respective fields, and upon completion of a curriculum students receive a diploma. The diploma is documentation verifying that the university institution as a whole recognizes a certain individual's knowledge and capabilities within a particular field of study.

On the other hand, the Ijazah forums has a much different approach in spreading knowledge. Emphasis is placed on one to one instruction rather than the institution as a whole. With the emphasis being on the relationship between student and the instructor the location is not necessarily of significant importance; much of where the education is being attained depends on the subject matter being taught, religious matters were largely taught in mosques, medicine in hospitals, while other subjects may have been taught t in madrasas or other locations. Another distinction of an ijazah is that they could be more focused on a singular subject than a college diploma, where the student takes classes on a variety of subjects in order to become a more rounded scholar, an ijazah could be given to a student on a single book or the student could be given a general ijazah. Upon completion of education in a subject a student would be examined orally by their instructor, much like students are to present a thesis in the modern-day education system. If a student successfully completed examination, they were to receive certification stating the subject in which they had expertise through their individual instructor; this documentation was referred to as an Ijazah and unlike the diploma it was not associated with the institution it was attained but rather solely with the instructor.

== Different types of ijazahs ==
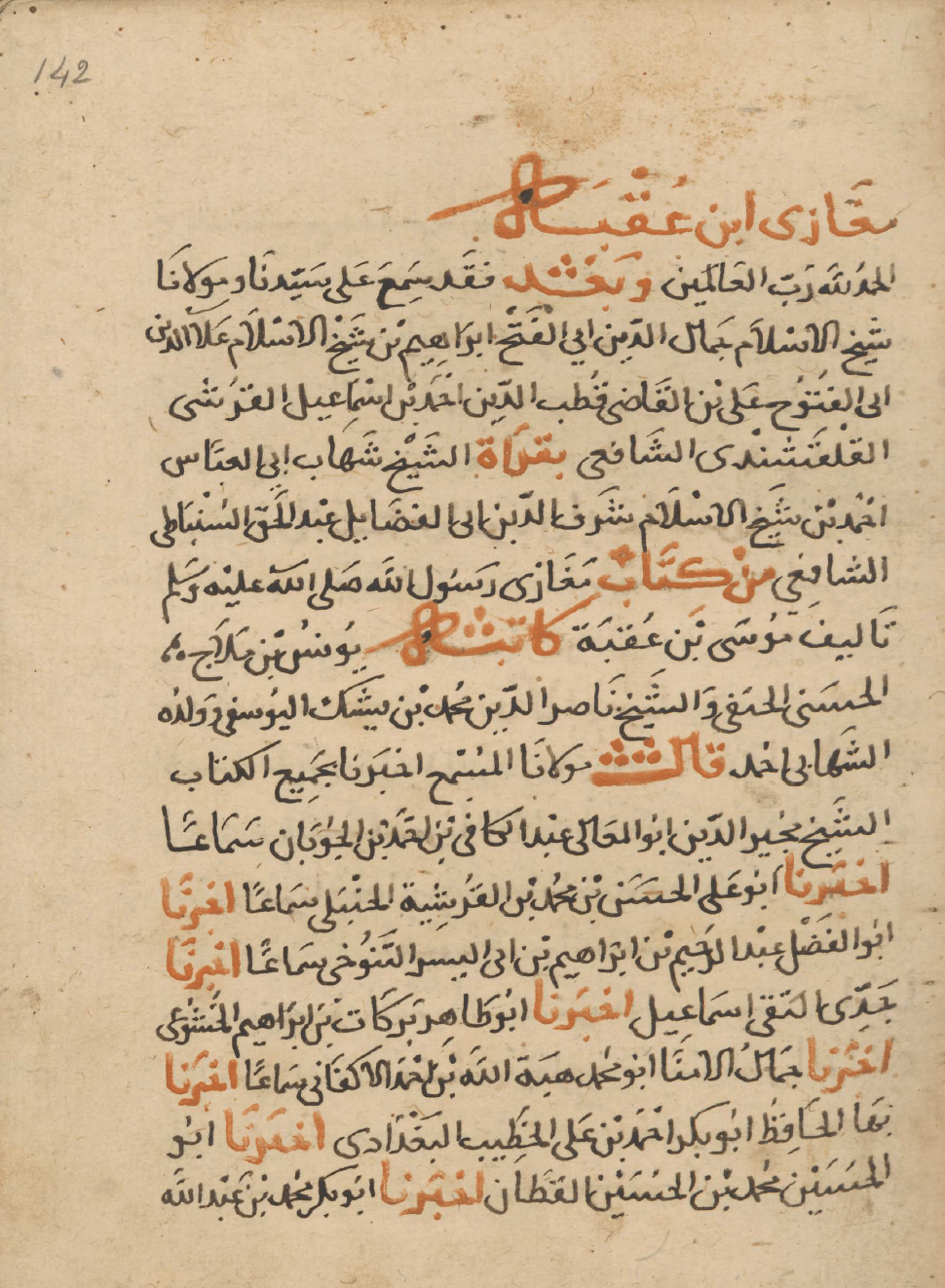
An Ijazah of Maghāzī Mūsā ibn ʿUqbah given by Al-Qalqashandi to his students.

Students could receive a number of different types of ijazahs based on what they were studying. The six different kinds of ijazahs were specific, non-specific, general, an ijazah on a book, ijazah by correspondence and an honorific ijazah. The specific ijazah was considered the highest form of an ijazah a student could receive because it stated that a specific student was permitted to teach a specific field by a specific teacher. The non-specific form stated the student and teachers name without giving the subject matter learned. The general ijazah only gave the teachers name and listed the students a group. An ijazah given over a certain book portrayed that the student had studied the book under the author and was able to recite the book by memory. An ijazah given by correspondence occurred whenever a teacher wrote down and sent a text to their students and gave them permission to teach only what they had written down. Finally an honorific ijazah was given as a form of respect to a prominent person, these however did not hold much weight in regards to allowing said person to teach the subject material.

== Demographics of students ==
Students that attained ijazahs came from all walks of life, and access to knowledge was not known to be limited by age, gender, or race. While the majority of students earned ijazahs in their thirties or forties, there were many notable exceptions to this social norm. One example of these exceptions is children of wealthy families would oftentimes be awarded ijazahs for the social status that it would bring. These children who were much too young to comprehend the subjects they were being given, if they attempted to learn the subject matter at all, and sometimes ijazahs were given out from a request by letter. Ijazahs related to hadith transmission were not limited to men. Female hadith scholars like Zaynab bint al-Kamal were known to not only earn ijazahs, but also to instruct other students.

== Ijazahs issued to a scribe vs a student ==
Ijazahs were not only given to students as a form of "diploma" to acknowledge that a student fully understood the teachings of his/her teacher. They were also given to scribes as a form of permission to transmit a book from the author. An ijazah given to a scribe by an author was basically a stamp of approval from the author that the scribe could replicate the work in order to share and preserve knowledge. The process for transmitting an authors book started with the author reciting his rough draft to the scribe with the scribe writing it down, after this was finished the scribe would then read what he had written back to the author, the author would then comment on what changes he/she wanted to make and then once the author was satisfied with the final work that is when an Ijazah was given to the scribe. This process varies highly from what a student would go through in order to receive an ijazah, this process consisted of the student being selected by the teacher to learn under them then he/she would learn from the teacher for a number of years before taking a test where the student would have to recite all of the teaching they had learned and comment on them concurrently and if the teacher felt as if the student fully understood their teaching they would award an ijazah to the student which meant they not only understood the teaching but they themselves could teach other students.

== Example of a Quran ijazah ==
The famous Quran reciter Sheikh Ra'ad bin Mohammad Al-Kurdi was taught under Sheikh Sherzad Abdulrahman bin Tahir, and his ijazah is as follows:

The example of the following Quran ijazah has the chain of Quran recitation (Qi'raa of Hafs) from the present day tracing all the way back to the prophet Muhammad.

Quran Ijazah
| Level | Reciter(s) of the Quran |
|---|---|
| 30 | Ra'ad bin Mohammed Al Kurdi |
| 29 | Sherzad Abdulrahman bin Tahir |
| 28 | Bakri bin Abdul Majeed bin Bakri bin Ahmed Al-Tarabishi Al-Dimashqi |
| 27 | Mohammed Salim bin Ahmed bin Mohammed Ali bin Mohammed al-Husseini Al-Dimashqi |
| 26 | Abu Al-Fawz Ahmed bin Ramadan bin Mansour bin Mohammed Al-Marzouki Al-Husni al-Malki Al-sanbati Al-Qayumi Al-Masri |
| 25 | Ibrahim Al-Obeidi Al-Hassni al-Maliki al-Azhari of Moroccan origin and Egyptian citizen |
| 24 | Abi al-Latif Abdulrahman bin Abdullah bin Hassan Bin Omar al-Ajhouri al-Maliki al-Azhari |
| 23 | Shihab al-Din Abu al-Samah Ahmed bin Ahmed Al-Baqri Al-Shafi'i Al-Azhari al-Masri |
| 22 | Shams al-Din Muhammad Bin Qasim bin Ismail Al-Baqri al-Kabir Al-Shenawi Al-Qahiri Al-Shafi'i Al-Azhari |
| 21 | Zainuddin Abdul Rahman bin Shehada Al-Yemeni Al-Shafi'i al-Masri |
| 20 | Noor al-Din Ali bin Mohammed bin Ali bin Khalil bin Ghanem Al-khazarji Al-Saadi Al-Abadi Al-Maqdisi |
| 19 | Shams al-Din Abu and Abu al-Fath Muhammad ibn Ibrahim ibn Ahmed Bin Makhlouf bin Ghali bin Abdul Al-Zaher al-samdisi al-Masri |
| 18 | Shihab al-Din Abu al-Abbas Ahmad ibn Asad-Din ibn Abdul Wahid bin Ahmad Al-Amyoti Al-Iskandari Al-Qaihri Al-Shafi'i |
| 17 | Abu al-Khayr Shams al-Din Muhammad ibn Muhammad ibn Muhammad ibn Ali ibn Yusuf al-Jazari |
| 16 | Taqi al-Din Abu Muhammad Abd al-Rahman bin Ahmed bin Ali bin Al-Mubarak bin Ma'ale al-Baghdadi Al-Masri Al-Shafi'i |
| 15 | Taqi al-Din Abu Abdullah Muhammad bin Ahmed bin Abdul Khaliq bin Ali Bin Salem Bin Maki al-Masri al-Shafi'i |
| 14 | Kamal al-Din Abu al Hassan Ali ibn Abi Al-fuwares Shuja bin Salem Bin Ali bin Musa Bin Hassan bin Touq bin Sanad bin Ali bin al-Fadl bin Ali bin Abdulrahman bin Ali bin Musa bin Isa bin Musa bin Muhammad Bin Ali bin Abdullah bin Abbas bin Abdul Muttalib bin Hashim al-Hashimi al-Abbasi al-Masri al-Shafi'i |
| 13 | Abu Al-Qasim Al-Qasim bin Fayrah bin Khalaf bin Ahmed Al-Raini Al-Andalusi Al-Shatibi |
| 12 | Abu al-Hassan Ali bin Mohammed bin Ali bin Hathil Al-Balansi |
| 11 | Abu Dawood Suleiman ibn Abu Al-Qasim Najah al-Umawi Al-Andalusi, sire of the Emir of Al-Andalus Al-muayyad Billah Ibn al-Mustansir |
| 10 | Abū ʿAmr ad-Dānī, known in his time as Ibn al-Ṣayrafī |
| 9 | Abi-Al-Hassan Tahir bin Abdul Moneim bin Obaidullah bin Ghalboun bin Al-Mubarak Al-Halabi |
| 8 | Abu Al-Hasan Ali bin Muhammad Bin Saleh Bin Dawood Al-Hashimi al-Ansari al-Basri Al-Darir |
| 7 | Abi Al-Abbas Ahmad bin Sahl bin Al-Fairzan Al-ashnani al-Baghdadi |
| 6 | Abi Mohammed Obaid Bin Al-Sabah bin Sabeeh Al-Nahashali |
| 5 | Abū ʽAmr Ḥafṣ ibn Sulaymān ibn al-Mughīrah ibn Abi Dawud al-Asadī al-Kūfī |
| 4 | Aasim ibn Abi al-Najud |
| 3 | Abu 'Abd al-Rahman al-Sulami |
| 2 | Uthman ibn Affan, Alī ibn Abī Ṭālib, Zayd bin Thabit, Ubayy ibn Ka'b, Abdullah ibn Masud |
| 1 | Muḥammad ibn ʿAbd Allāh ibn ʿAbd al-Muṭṭalib ibn Hāshim |

== See also ==
- Apostolic succession – Continuous succession from the apostles
- Isnad
- Silsilah – Concept of lineage in Sufi order of Islam
- Hadith – Collections of sayings and teachings of Muhammad
- I'jaz – Claim that the Qur'ān has a miraculous quality
