= Ibrahim Ahmad (disambiguation) =

Ibrahim Ahmad, Ibrahim Ahmed or Brahim Ahmed may refer to:

- Ibrahim Ahmad – Iraqi Kurdish writer, novelist and translator (1914–2000)
- Ibrahim Ahmad Maqary – Nigerian religious leader (b. 1976)
- Ibrahim Ahmad Abd al-Sattar – Chief of staff of the Iraqi armed forces under Saddam Hussein
- Ibrahim Ahmad (football)
