= Obaid bin Al-Saba =

Primary transmitter of the Qira'at (d. 834 CE)

- أبي محمد عبيد بن الصباح بن صبيح النهشلي

Personal life
- Died: 834 CE / 219 AH
- Main interest: Qu'ran
- Known for: Qu'ran recitation
- Other name: Abi Muhammad Obaid bin Al-Sabah bin Subaih Al-Nahshali

Religious life
- Religion: Islam

Muslim leader
- Teacher: Hafs
- Students: Al-Ashnani

Obaid bin Al-Saba (died 834 CE/ 219 AH)(Arabic: عبيد بن الصباح) was a Qur'an reciter. Obaid bin Al-Saba was a student of Hafs, and holds a place in many Ijazah lineages. Obaid bin Al-Saba lived for part of his life in Kufa and Baghdad. One of his notable students was Al-Ashnani.
