= Abuja National Mosque =

Mosque in Abuja, Federal Capital Territory, Nigeria

- الجامع الوطني أبوجا
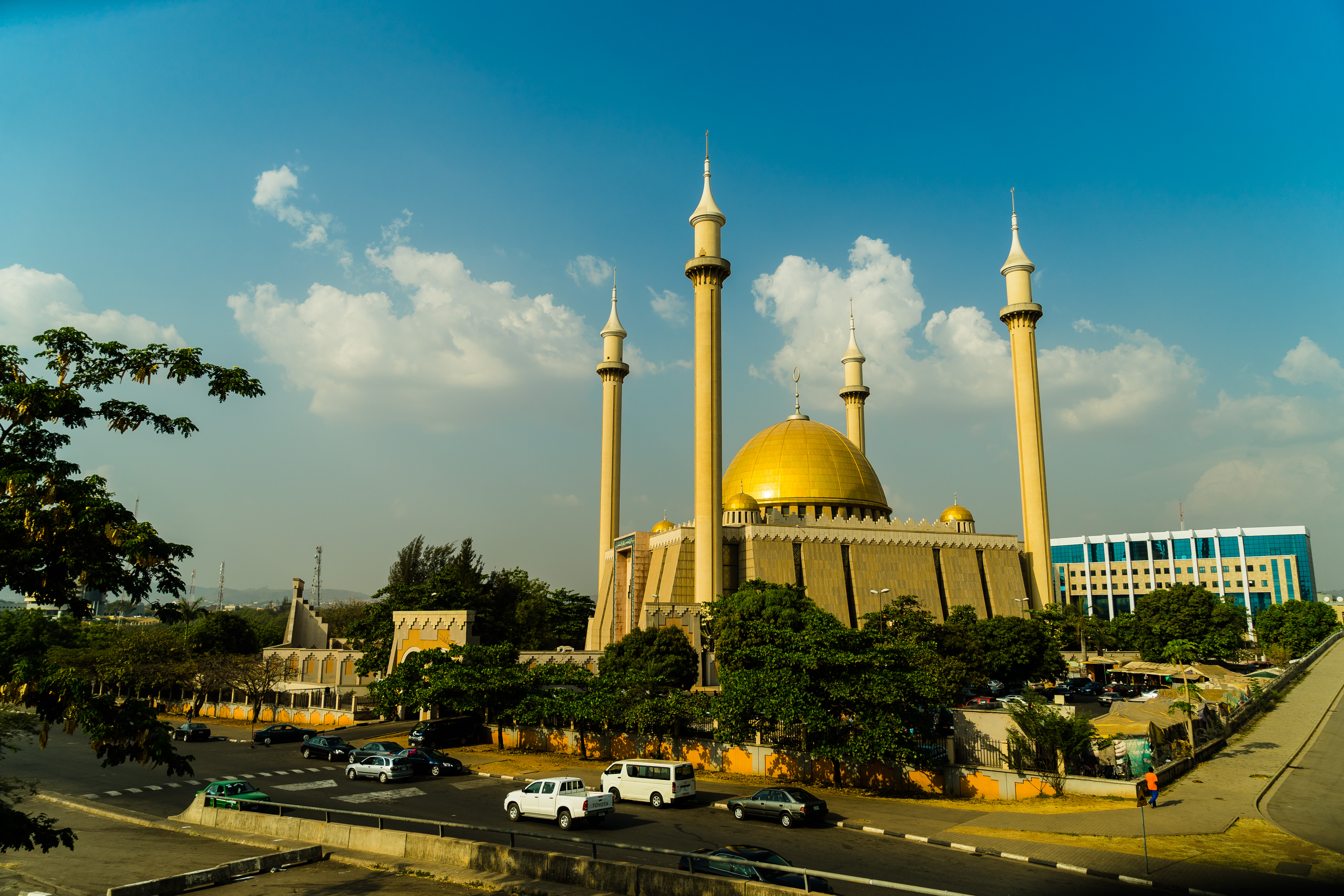

- Location within Nigeria

Religion
- Affiliation: Sunni Islam
- Ecclesiastical or organisational status: Mosque
- Status: Active

Location
- Location: Abuja
- Country: Nigeria
- Interactive map of Abuja National Mosque
- Coordinates: 9°03′39″N 7°29′23″E

Architecture
- Type: Mosque
- Completed: 1984

Specifications
- Dome: 2
- Minaret: 4

Website
- abujanationalmosque.org

The Abuja National Mosque (Arabic: الجامع الوطني أبوجا), also known as the Nigerian National Mosque, is the national mosque of Nigeria, located in the capital city, Abuja. The mosque was built in 1984 and is open to the non-Muslim public, except during congregational prayers.

== Overview ==
The mosque is located in the capital city, Abuja, and is situated on Independence Avenue, across from the National Christian Centre. It includes a library and a conference room.

The complex includes a conference centre capable of serving six hundred persons, the office for the Islamic Centre, and residential facilities for the imams and muazzins. During construction, the general contractors were Lodigiani Nigeria Ltd., while design consultancy was provided by AIM Consultants Ltd.

== Board and management ==
After the demise of the chief imam, Sheikh Musa Muhammad in 2015, the position of a Chief Imam was abolished.

On 9 October 2017, with approval of the Nigerian Supreme Council for Islamic Affairs, the Abuja National Mosque Management Board was dissolved under the chairmanship of Alh. Yahaya Abubakar, the Etsu Nupe was also dissolved and in its stead a Sole Administrator, to be addressed as the Murshid of the National Mosque, was appointed in the person of Professor Shehu Ahmad Said Galadanci, CON as well as three Imams who were hitherto addressed as Deputy Chief Imams were appointed as coequal Imams of National Mosque to assist the Murshid. They are Prof. Ibrahim Ahmad Maqari, Sheikh Ahmad Onilewura and Dr. Muhammad Kabir Adam. The Murshid assumed duty on 15 November 2017, combining the post of Chief Imam and Administrative Head of the National Mosque.

Prof. Galadanci doubles as the murshid (grand instructor, spiritual guide or general administrator).

Formally, the board of the management is headed by Ibrahim Dasuki, the 18th sultan of Sokoto and president-general of the Nigerian Supreme Council for Islamic Affairs in April 1992 but presently, the management board is under the chairmanship of Yahaya Abubakar.

The first Igbo Chief Imam of Abuja National Mosque is Iliyasu Tochukwu Usman from Igbo Eze South, Enugu State.

Aims Construction Limited was awarded the project of building the mosque and they completed the project in 1985.

On 2 December 2024, with approval of the Nigerian Supreme Council for Islamic Affairs, Dr Abdulkadir Salman Jummu'ah Solagberu, the first Maalami Ubandoma of Ilorin emirates and also the founder of Darul Kitaab Wa Sunnah of Arabic and Islamic studies, was appointed as the new elect Chief Imam of the central mosque of Abuja Nigeria.

== See also ==
- Islam in Nigeria
- List of mosques in Nigeria
