= Lagos Central Mosque =

Mosque in Lagos, Nigeria

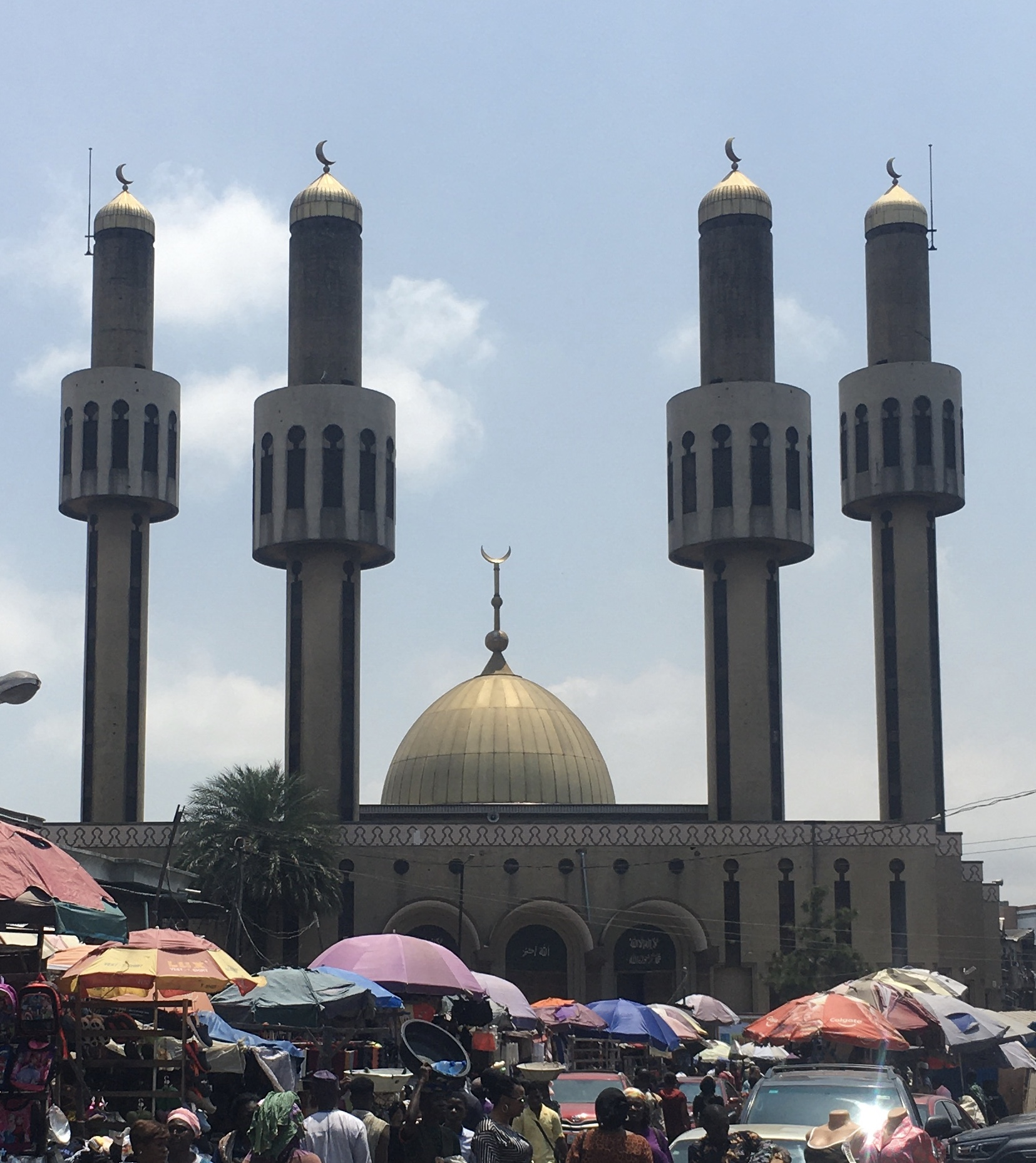

- Location of the mosque in Nigeria

Religion
- Affiliation: Islam
- Ecclesiastical or organizational status: Mosque
- Status: Active

Location
- Location: Lagos Island, Lagos
- Country: Nigeria
- Interactive map of Lagos Central Mosque
- Coordinates: 6°27′26″N 3°23′17″E

Architecture
- Type: Mosque
- General contractor: G. Cappa Ltd.
- Established: 28 May 1988
- Completed: 1988

Specifications
- Dome: 1
- Dome dia. (outer): 15 m (49 ft)
- Minaret: 4

The Lagos Central Mosque is a jum'at mosque, located in Lagos Island, Lagos, the largest city in Nigeria. The mosque serves as the principal home of the Chief Imam of Lagos. It is located along the busy Nnamdi Azikiwe Street.

The current mosque was opened for use in May 1988, displacing an earlier mosque that was built between 1908 and 1913. The chief Imam leads jumat service at the mosque and he is the custodian of the mosque. Over the years, titles have been given to individuals by officials of the mosque's executive council. A prominent title is the Baba Adinni, first held by a Mr. Runmonkun, and recently bestowed on A.W. Elias, Wahab Folawiyo and Abdul Hafiz Abou. The first two title holders played significant roles in the construction of a new modern mosque.

== History ==
The first central mosque in Lagos was developed by the Jamat Muslim Council of Lagos who established an executive council of the Lagos Central Mosque around 1905. The new mosque was completed in July 1913 and served the Lagos community for 70 years.

Ideas about building a new mosque began soon after the golden jubilee celebration of the old central mosque in 1963. The old mosque was deemed archaic by some members who wanted a new befitting edifice for da'wa while some preferred an extension of the old structure. Initially, funds were raised in 1973 for the construction of an extension to the old mosque and purchase of adjoining properties. The plan was later shelved with majority of members preferring a new edifice; the old mosque was finally demolished in 1983. Members then attended Friday prayers at a nearby Alli-Balogun mosque until the new mosque was completed.

Opened by President Babangida on May 28, 1988, the new mosque was built by G. Cappa Ltd. It has four prominent minarets, two small and two tall ones, the smaller ones are placed on top of the entrance and the taller ones flanked the west and east wing of the building. The building space is about one acre and consumes 50 metres of space along Nnamdi Azikiwe. The new building entrance leads to a riwaq, accentuated by decorated columns and beside it is the courtyard or Sahn. The prayer function is served by a 750 sq meter prayer hall with a central dome made of metal that is 15 metres in diameter and conspicuous outside because of its gold plated aluminium cladding. There is space underneath the building for the vaults of deceased Imams and prominent members and for use as a drive in garage. The building also has an office block, reference library, Islamic centre and apartment for the Chief Imam.

== Gallery ==
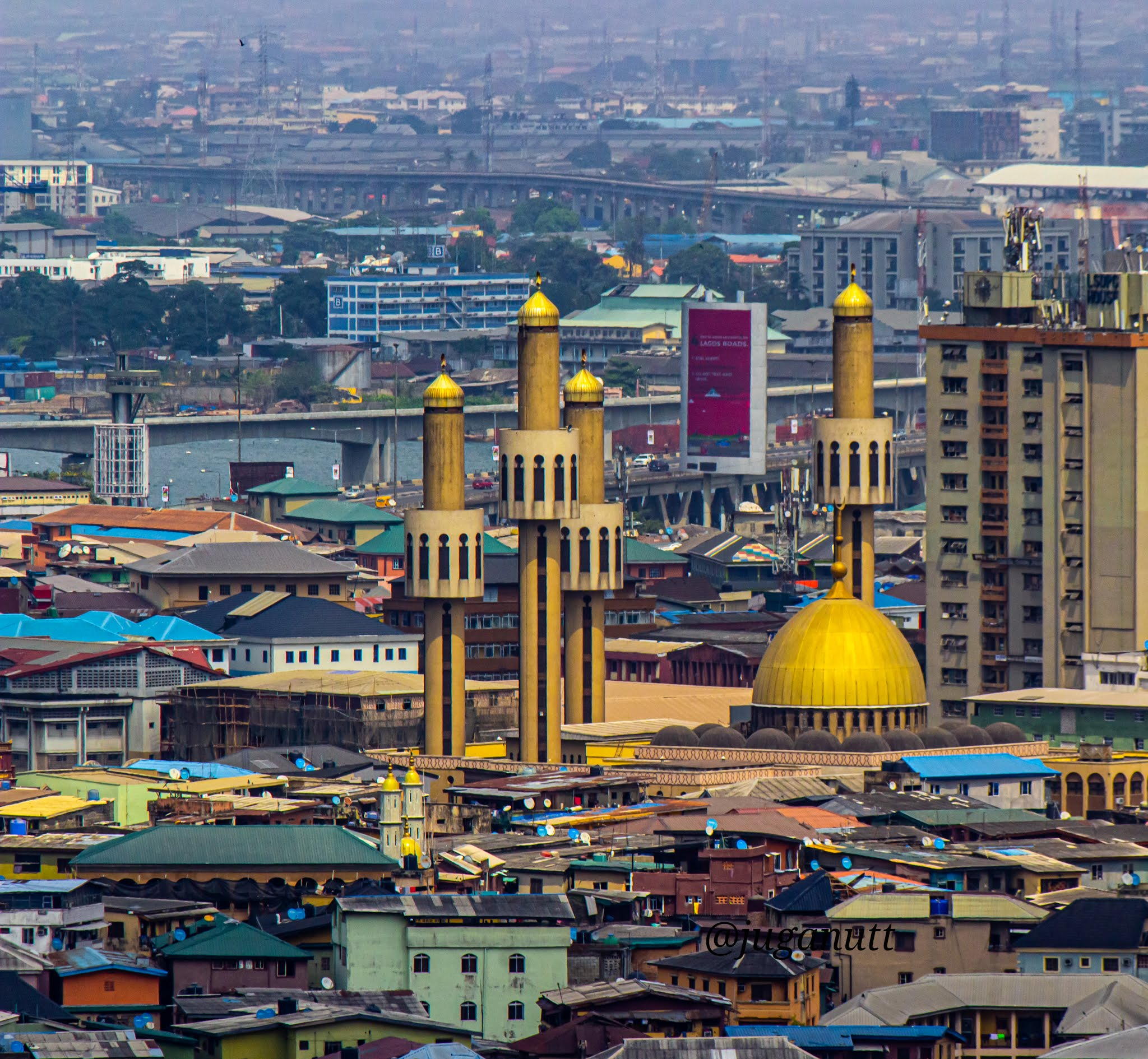

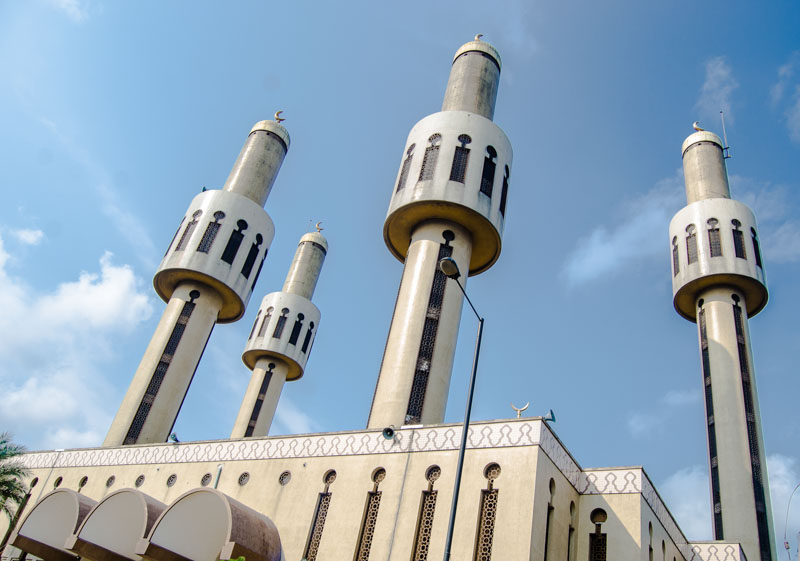

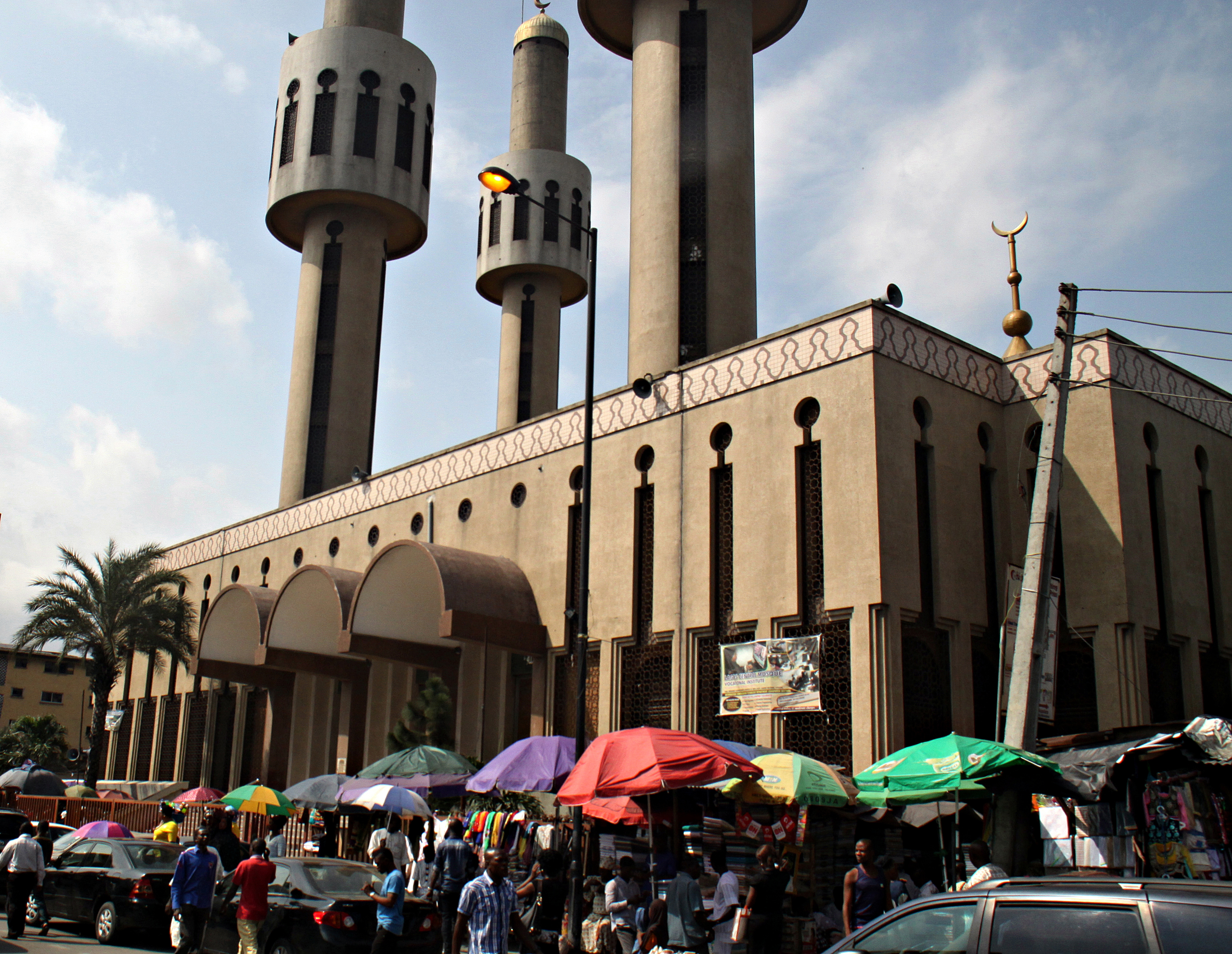

== See also ==
- Islam in Nigeria
- List of mosques in Nigeria
