= Ilyas Tochukwu Usman =

Igbo Islamic scholar

Professor Ilyas Tochukwu Usman
- Born: Igbo-Eze South, Enugu State
- Occupations: Professor, Islamic scholar
- Known for: Chief Imam of Abuja National Mosque

Ilyas Tochukwu Usman is an Igbo academic and Islamic scholar of Arabic studies and Islamic education who is the Chief Imam of Abuja National Mosque. He is the country’s first Igbo Chief Imam of Abuja National Mosque and is recognised as the first professor of Arabic from Igboland.

Professor Tochukwu was born in Ibagwa-aka, a community in Igbo-Eze South local government area of Enugu State. He obtained bachelor's degree at the King Saud University in Riyadh, Saudi Arabia and then proceeded to University of Madinah where he completed his higher education. He became Chief Imam of Abuja National Mosque In October 2024.
