= Reni Folawiyo =

Nigerian entrepaneur

- Born: London
- Occupation: Fashion Entrepreneur Business woman
- Known for: Promoting Africa fashion
- Spouse: Tunde Folawiyo
- Children: 2

Reni Folawiyo is a Nigerian lawyer, fashion entrepreneur and businesswoman. She's the founder of Alara, West Africa’s first fashion luxury and lifestyle concept store which was designed by British-Ghanaian architect David Adjaye. She owns NOK Garden and NOK by Alara to promote African cuisine.

== Early life and education ==
Folawiyo was born in London to late Chief Lateef Adegbite, former Attorney General of Western Nigeria and former Secretary-General of the Nigerian Supreme Council for Islamic Affairs and raised in Abeokuta, Ogun state, Nigeria. She is Yoruba.

She studied commercial law in the University of Warwick, United Kingdom and came back to Nigeria to start practising in her father's law firm

== Personal life ==
She married Nigerian businessman Tunde Folawiyo in 1989 and they have two children, Faridah and Fuaad.
