= Tunde Folawiyo =

Nigerian businessman (born 1960)

- Born: 12 April 1960 (age 66); Nigeria
- Education: London School of Economics and Political Science, University College London
- Spouse: Reni Folawiyo

Tijani Babatunde Folawiyo (born 12 April 1960) is a Nigerian businessman. He is the managing director of the Folawiyo Group, and the chairman of Coronation Merchant Bank. According to Forbes, he was worth an estimated $650 million in 2014.

== Career ==
Tunde Folawiyo is Chairman of the Folawiyo Group, an organisation with interests in energy, agriculture, shipping, and real estate. The conglomerate was founded by his father, Wahab Folawiyo, Tunde took over the organisation in 2008 when his father passed.

Tunde served as Director of MTN Nigeria Ltd He was previously a non-executive director of Access Bank plc (formerly Access Bank Nigeria) from 11 October 2005 to 29 January 2014. He was called to the Bar of England and Wales in 1985, he started his law practice in Nigeria with the firm Ogunsanya, but resigned from law in 1989. Since 1996, Tunde has also served as the Vice President of Nigeria Association of Indigenous Petroleum Explorers & Productions (NAIPEC). He was the Chairman of Enyo Retail, a Nigerian downstream Oil and Gas Company

== Education ==
Tunde Folawiyo was educated at the London School of Economics, where he obtained a B.Sc. degree in economics in 1980, and an LL.B in 1984. He obtained an LL.M degree from the University College London in June 1985.

== Honours ==
In 2010, Tunde was the recipient of the African Leadership Award. He was also awarded an honorary doctorate in business administration from Crescent University in Abeokuta, Nigeria. Tunde serves as a Goodwill Ambassador, Honorary Citizen of the city of Houston and Honorary Consul of Barbados.

== Boards and committees ==
Tunde is a member of the global advisory board of the African Leadership Academy, a pan-African institute dedicated to developing and mentoring new generations of African leaders. Tunde is a fellow of the Duke of Edinburgh's World Fellowship. He is also a member of the Governing Council of the Lagos State University and the Lagos State Government. He also sits on the Board of Trustees of Crescent University in Abeokuta.
