= Yola Central Mosque =

Mosque in Yola, Adamawa, Nigeria

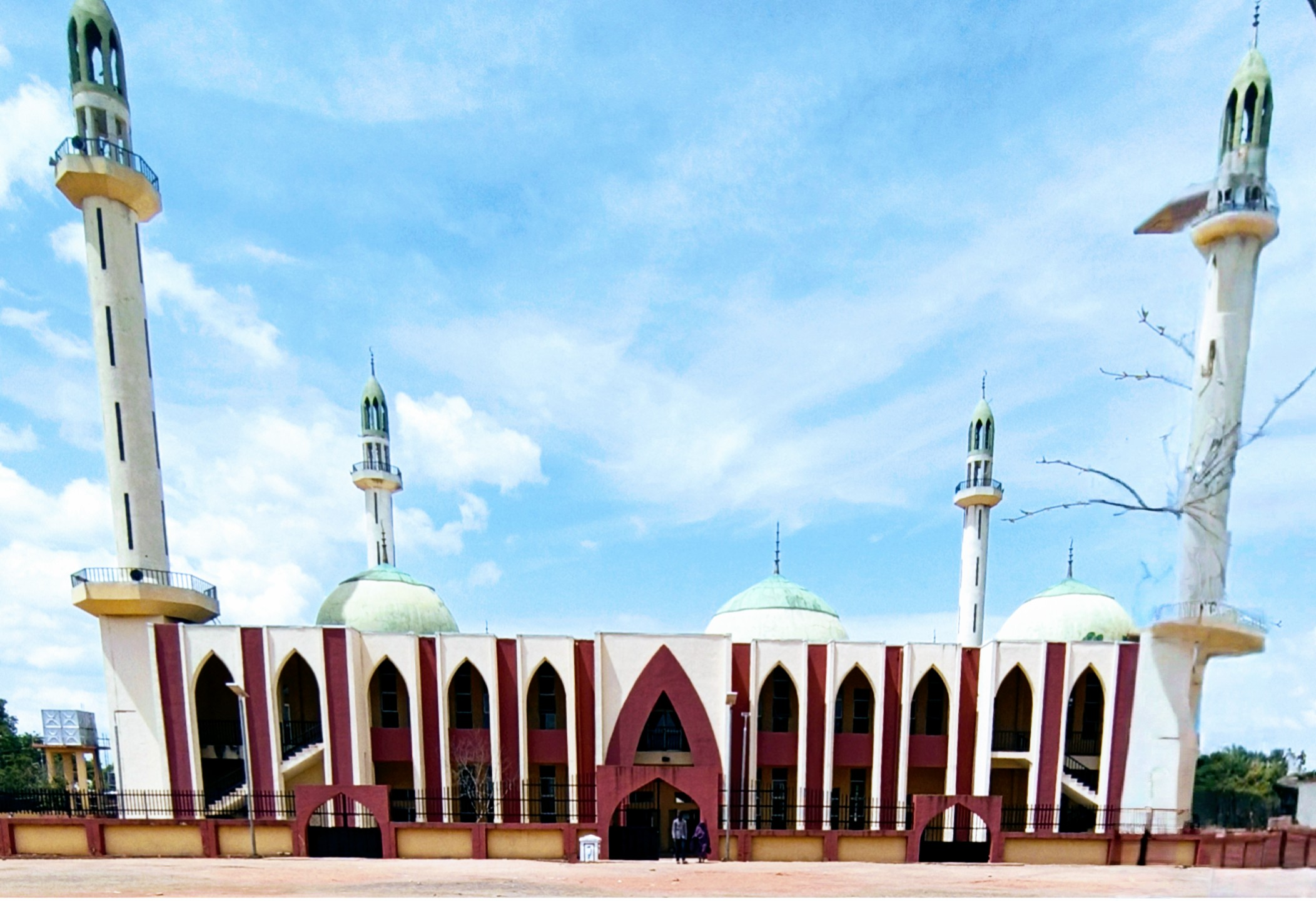

Religion
- Affiliation: Islam
- Region: West Africa
- Status: Active

Location
- Location: Jimeta, Yola North, Adamawa State, Nigeria
- Interactive map of Yola Central Mosque
- Coordinates: 9°12′27″N 12°29′24″E

Architecture
- Type: Mosque
- Style: Sudano–Sahelian, Modern Islamic
- Completed: 20th century (reconstruction)

Specifications
- Capacity: Several thousand
- Dome: 1 (main)
- Minaret: 4

The Yola Central Mosque is a 19th-century mosque located in Yola, the capital of Adamawa State, Nigeria.

== History ==
The mosque was established in 1841, during the early period of Yola's development as the headquarters of the Adamawa Emirate, by Modibbo Adama, a disciple of Usman dan Fodio.

== Architecture ==
The mosque's architecture combines Sudano-Sahelian and modern Islamic styles. It features large domes, tall minarets, and spacious prayer halls capable of holding thousands of worshippers. The walls are decorated with Islamic calligraphy and geometric patterns that reflect Northern Nigerian artistry. The central dome symbolizes unity in the Muslim community, while the courtyard provides additional space for prayers during the major Islamic festivals of Eid al-Fitr and Eid al-Adha.

== Religious and cultural role ==
Yola Central Mosque is a center of religious, educational, and social life in the city. It hosts daily prayers, Friday congregational prayers, religious lectures, and community events. The mosque also serves as a center for Islamic learning, where scholars and students engage in Quran and Hadith studies.

During the holy month of Ramadan, the mosque becomes a focal point for communal prayers (Taraweeh) and charitable activities.

== Incidents ==
In 2010, Yola and parts of Adamawa State experienced security challenges due to insurgency activities in northeastern Nigeria. Despite these challenges, the mosque remained a resilient symbol of faith and peace. Reconstruction and security improvements have since been made to ensure the safety and preservation of the mosque.

== Location ==
The Yola Central Mosque is located in the Jimeta district of Yola North Local Government Area, close to the emir’s palace and other key administrative and commercial centers.

== See also ==
- Islam in Nigeria
- List of mosques in Nigeria
