= List of mosques in Nigeria =

This is a list of mosques in Nigeria.

== List ==
| Name | Image | Location | Year (CE) | Group | Notes |
|---|---|---|---|---|---|
| Gobarau Mosque (only minaret remains) | | Katsina | 15th century | | The mosque was demolished in the 19th century. 15-metre-tall (50 ft) minaret remains. |
| Great Mosque of Kano | | Kano | 15th century | Su | Rebuilt in the mid-19th century; destroyed in the 1950s; subsequently rebuilt. |
| Gurin Central Mosque | | Gurin, Fufore, Adamawa State | 1806 | | |
| Yola Central Mosque | | Yola, Yola, Adamawa State | 1841 | | |
| Shitta-Bey Mosque | | Lagos Island, Lagos | 1892 | | National Monument of Nigeria |
| Juma'a mosque of Zaria | | Zaria | 19th century | | |
| Maiduguri Central Mosque | | Maiduguri, Borno State | 1918 | Su | |
| Ikorodu Central Mosque | | Ikorodu | 1930s | | |
| Sultan Bello Mosque | | Kaduna | 1962 | Su | |
| Abuja National Mosque | | Abuja | 1984 | Su | National mosque |
| Lagos Central Mosque | | Lagos | 1988 | | Serves as the home of the Chief Imam of Lagos; current structured replaced an earlier mosque building between 1908 and 1913. |

== See also ==
- Islam in Nigeria
- List of mosques in Africa
