= Funmi Iyanda =

Nigerian talk show host and broadcaster

- Born: Olufunmilola Iyanda; 27 July 1971 (age 55); Lagos, Nigeria
- Other name: Aduke
- Education: Geography
- Alma mater: University of Ibadan
- Parents: Gabriel (father); Yetunde (mother)

Olufunmilola Aduke Iyanda (born 27 July 1971), known professionally as Funmi Iyanda, is a Nigerian talk show host, broadcaster, film and television producer, media executive, philanthropist, journalist, and blogger. She produced and hosted a talk show, New Dawn with Funmi, which aired on the national network for over eight years. Iyanda rose to become one of Nigeria’s most watched television personalities. Iyanda is the CEO of OYA Media (formerly Ignite Media). In 2011, Iyanda was honoured for her web series by the World Economic Forum and was named one of Forbes "20 Youngest Powerful Women in Africa".

== Early life ==
Iyanda was born in Lagos to the family of Gabriel and Yetunde Iyanda. Her father was from Ogbomoso and her mother from Ijebu-Ode. She grew up in the Lagos Mainland area; however, her mother died when she was seven years old. She attended the African Church Princess Primary School, Akoka, and the Herbert Macaulay School in Lagos, Nigeria, for her primary education and the International School Ibadan for her secondary education. She then went on to the University of Ibadan, where she graduated with a Bachelor of Science degree in Geography.

== Good Morning Nigeria and Sports Journalism ==
Iyanda's foray into television began when she started producing and presenting Good Morning Nigeria, a breakfast magazine television show. The "Heroes" segment, which exalted the achievement of deserving members of society, and "Street Life", which unlike many shows at the time, went out on the streets in search of compelling Nigerian human-interest stories.

The show focused on the injustices suffered by Nigerians, particularly the vulnerable members such as women and children. The show was syndicated on national television.

The first show she anchored was called MITV Live, produced by Segun Odegbami and Tunde Kelani. She also explored her deep passion for sports by entering the world of sports journalism. She worked on a documentary for the 2006 Africa Cup of Nations and she covered the 1999 female Football World Cup, the All Africa Games in Zimbabwe, as well as the 2000 and 2004 Olympic Games in Sydney and Athens.

== New Dawn with Funmi ==
New Dawn with Funmi started in 2000 and ran daily on NTA 10 Lagos. The success of the show made it the longest-running independently produced show on NTA.

Iyanda has also written regular columns in Tempo Magazine. On occasion, she still serves as a guest columnist for Farafina Magazine. She has also written for PM News, The Punch, Daily Trust, and Vanguard Newspapers.

== Talk With Funmi ==
In 2010, after a two-year break, Iyanda returned to the screen with Talk with Funmi (TWF), a television show directed by Chris Dada. Talk With Funmi travels throughout Nigeria, from state to state, capturing people and conversations around the country.

== My Country: Nigeria ==
In 2010, Iyanda completed production on My Country: Nigeria, a three-part documentary celebrating the 50th anniversary of the country’s independence, which was aired on the BBC World Service. One of the episodes of the documentary "Lagos Stories" was subsequently nominated in the category for “Best News Documentary” at the 2011 Monte Carlo Television Festival in Monaco.

== Chopcassava ==
In 2012, Iyanda and her creative partner Chris Dada released Chopcassava, a web series documenting the January 2012 fuel subsidy protests that took place in Lagos, Nigeria. It could not be aired on Nigerian TV, the web series presents an insider view of the Lagos protests, in which people of all classes took to the streets demanding a reversal of the 117% hike in petrol prices. It was nominated in the non-fiction web series category at the 2012 BANFF World Media Festival, in Alberta, Canada.

== Personal life ==
Iyanda is a member of the African Leadership Institute, Tutu Fellow, and a participant of the ASPEN Institute's Forum for Communications and Society.

In 2012, Iyanda was honoured by the Lagos State Governor, Babatunde Raji Fashola, for her commitment to gender advocacy as she returned from a five-day UN advocacy trek up Mount Kilimanjaro. The climb was organised by the UN to raise global awareness on its campaign to end violence against women and girls and brought together climbers from more than 32 African countries in a historic advocacy journey up Mount Kilimanjaro.

Iyanda served on the Board of Farafina Trust and Positive Impact Youth Network. She participated at the Occupy Nigeria series of protests in January 2012. The protests were to resist the implementation of the government's fuel subsidy removal policy.

== Recognition ==
Iyanda was recognised as one of the BBC's 100 women of 2014.
