= Iyanda =

Nigerian Given Name

Ìyàndá
- Gender: Male & Female (unisex)
- Language: Yoruba

Origin
- Origin: Yoruba
- Meaning: "one specially chosen to be made"
- Region of origin: South-west, Nigeria

Ìyàndá audio is a Yoruba name predominantly used in South-west Nigeria. The name is composed of three distinct words "Ì" meaning "the act of", yàn meaning "to select", and dá meaning "to create". Hence, the full meaning of Ìyàndá can be interpreted as "one specially chosen to be made" or "purposefully made". It is a name used by both males and females (unisex) and holds significance within the Yoruba community for its connotation of intentional creation or uniqueness.

== Popular people with the given name and surname ==
- Funmi Iyanda (born 1971), Nigerian media executive
- Wahab Iyanda Folawiyo, Nigerian businessman
