= Ikorodu Central Mosque =

Mosque in Ikorodu, Lagos, Nigeria

- Location within Nigeria

Religion
- Affiliation: Islam
- Ecclesiastical or organizational status: Mosque
- Status: Active

Location
- Location: Ikorodu, Lagos State
- Country: Nigeria
- Interactive map of Ikorodu Central Mosque

Architecture
- Groundbreaking: January 12, 1933
- Completed: 1930s

The Ikorodu Central Mosque is a mosque located in Ikorodu, Lagos State, Nigeria. The foundation stone was laid on January 12, 1933 in a ceremony performed by Lemomu Buraimoh of Ikorodu. The historical and cultural landmark is situated on Itun-Nla Street and serves as a center for community life and Islamic education.

== History ==
The mosque was built to serve as the primary center for Islamic worship in the growing Ikorodu community. Over the decades, it has been a beacon for Islamic teachings, community gatherings, and fostering the religious education of its adherents. As Ikorodu expanded, the mosque adapted to accommodate the increase of more worshippers, reinforcing its role as a spiritual and cultural hub. The mosque is a vital member of the Ikorodu Muslim Community Association (IMCA), an umbrella organization that unites Islamic groups in the region. IMCA was established to promote unity, Islamic education, and community welfare. The mosque actively participates in initiatives aimed at poverty alleviation, educational development, and religious harmony.

== See also ==
- Islam in Nigeria
- List of mosques in Nigeria
