= Education in Islam =

Education has played a central role in Islam since the beginnings of the religion, owing in part to the centrality of scripture and its study in the Islamic tradition. Before the modern era, education would begin at a young age with study of Arabic and the Quran. For the first few centuries of Islam, educational settings were entirely informal, but beginning in the 11th and 12th centuries, the ruling elites began to establish institutions of higher religious learning known as madrasas (Arabic: مدرسة, lit. 'school') in an effort to secure support and cooperation of the ulema (religious scholars). Madrasas soon multiplied throughout the Islamic world, which helped to spread Islamic learning beyond urban centers and to unite diverse Islamic communities in a shared cultural project. Madrasas were devoted principally to study of Islamic law, but they also offered other subjects such as theology, medicine, and mathematics. Muslims historically distinguished disciplines inherited from pre-Islamic civilizations, such as philosophy and medicine, which they called "sciences of the ancients" or "rational sciences", from Islamic religious sciences. Sciences of the former type flourished for several centuries, and their transmission formed part of the educational framework in classical and medieval Islam. In some cases, they were supported by institutions such as the House of Wisdom in Baghdad, but more often they were transmitted informally from teacher to student.

== Etymology ==
In Arabic, three terms are used for education. The most common term is taʿlīm (تعليم), from the root ʿalima (علم), which means knowing, being aware, perceiving and learning. Another term is tarbiyah (تربية) from the root of rabbā (ربى), which means spiritual and moral growth based on the will of God. The third term is taʾdīb (تأديب) from the root addaba (أدب) which means to be cultured or well accurate in social behavior.

== Education in pre-modern Islam ==
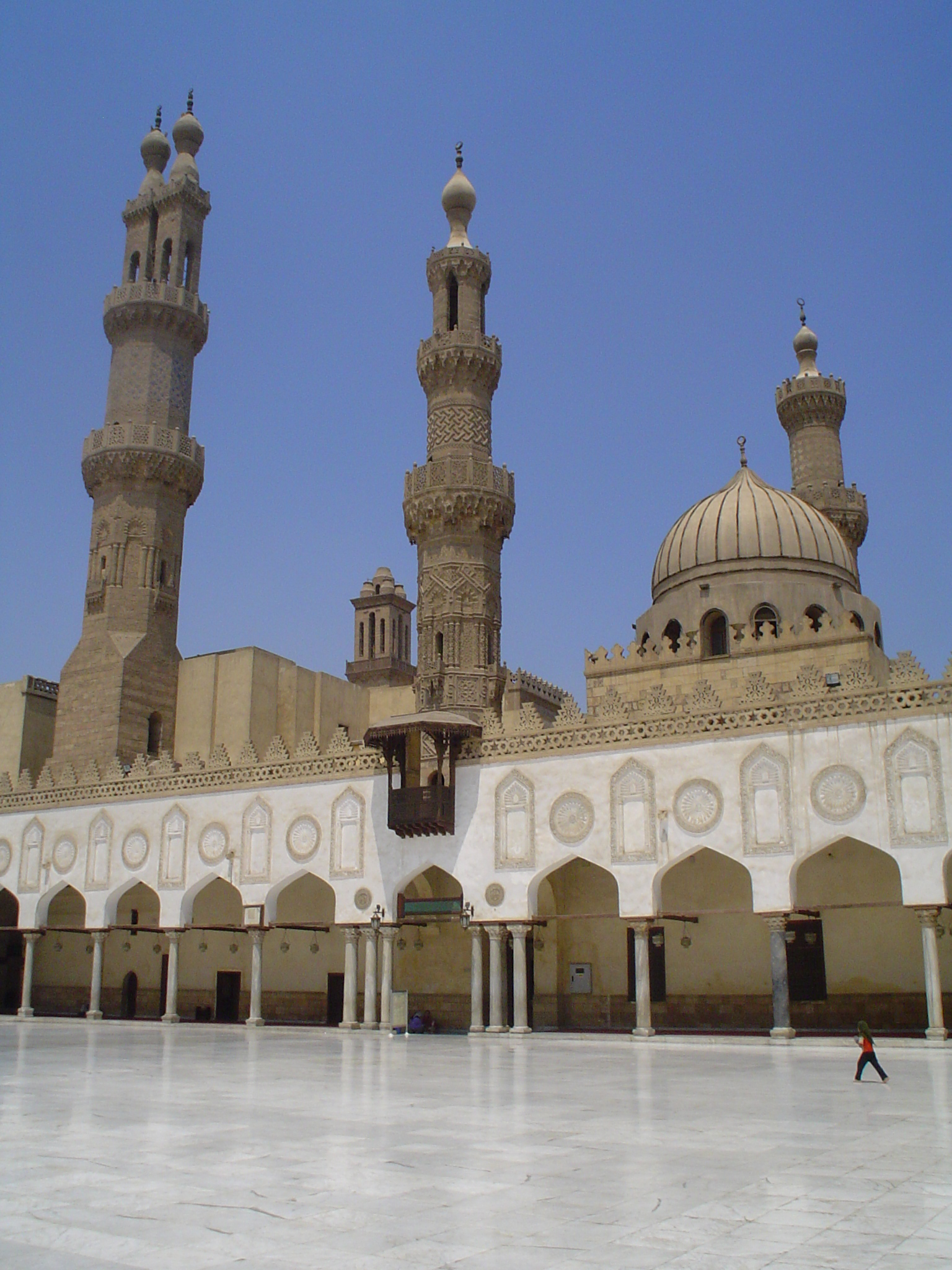
Organized instruction in the Cairo Al-Azhar Mosque began in 978.

Education would begin at a young age with study of Arabic and the Quran, either at home or in a primary school, which was often attached to a mosque. Some students would then proceed to training in tafsir (Quranic exegesis) and fiqh (Islamic jurisprudence), which was seen as particularly important. Education focused on memorization, but also trained the more advanced students to participate as readers and writers in the tradition of commentary on the studied texts. It also involved a process of socialization of aspiring scholars, who came from virtually all social backgrounds, into the ranks of the ulema.

The Islamic Empire, spanning for almost 1,000 years, saw at least 60 major learning centers throughout the Middle East and North Africa, some of the most prominent among these being Baghdad in the East and Cordoba in the West. For the first few centuries of Islam, educational settings were entirely informal, but beginning in the 11th and 12th centuries, the ruling elites began to establish institutions of higher religious learning known as madrasas in an effort to secure support and cooperation of the ulema. Madrasas soon multiplied throughout the Islamic world, which helped to spread Islamic learning beyond urban centers and to unite diverse Islamic communities in a shared cultural project. Nevertheless, instruction remained focused on individual relationships between students and their teacher. The formal attestation of educational attainment, ijaza, was granted by a particular scholar rather than the institution, and it placed its holder within a genealogy of scholars, which was the only recognized hierarchy in the educational system. While formal studies in madrasas were open only to men, women of prominent urban families were commonly educated in private settings and many of them received and later issued ijazas in hadith studies, calligraphy and poetry recitation. Working women learned religious texts and practical skills primarily from each other, though they also received some instruction together with men in mosques and private homes.

From the 8th century to the 12th century, the primary mode of receiving education in the Islamic world was from private tutors for wealthy families who could afford a formal education, not madrasas. This formal education was most readily available to members of the caliphal court including the viziers, administrative officers, and wealthy merchants. These private instructors were well known scholars who taught their students Arabic, literature, religion, mathematics, and philosophy. Islamic Sassanian tradition praises the idea of a 'just ruler' or a king learned in the ways of philosophy. This concept of an 'enlightened philosopher-king' served as a catalyst for the spread of education to the populace.

Madrasas were devoted principally to the study of law, but they also offered other subjects such as theology, medicine, and mathematics. The madrasa complex usually consisted of a mosque, boarding house, and a library. It was maintained by a waqf (charitable endowment), which paid salaries of professors, stipends of students, and defrayed the costs of construction and maintenance. The madrasa was unlike a modern college in that it lacked a standardized curriculum or institutionalized system of certification.

Madrasa education taught medicine and pharmacology primarily on the basis of humoral pathology. The Greek physician Hippocrates is credited for developing the theory of the four humors, also known as humoral pathology. The humors influence bodily health and emotion and it was thought that sickness and disease stemmed from an imbalance in a person's humors, and health could only be restored by finding humoral equilibrium through remedies of food or bloodletting. Each humor is thought to be related to a universal element and every humor expresses specific properties. The interpenetration of the individual effects of each humor on the body are called mizādj. Black Bile is related to the earth element and expresses cold and dry properties, yellow bile is related to fire and subsequently is dry and warm, phlegm is related to water and it expresses moist and cold properties, and blood is air displaying moist and warm qualities.

To aid in medical efforts to fight disease and sickness, Ibn Sina also known as Avicenna, wrote the Canon of Medicine. This was a five-book encyclopedia compilation of Avicenna's research towards healing illnesses, and it was widely used for centuries across Eurasia as a medical textbook. Many of Avicenna's ideas came from al-Razi's al-Hawi.

Muslims distinguished disciplines inherited from pre-Islamic civilizations, such as philosophy and medicine, which they called "sciences of the ancients" or "rational sciences", from Islamic religious sciences. Sciences of the former type flourished for several centuries, and their transmission formed part of the educational framework in classical and medieval Islam. In some cases, they were supported by institutions such as the House of Wisdom in Baghdad, but more often they were transmitted informally from teacher to student.

The University of al-Qarawiyyin, founded in 859 AD, is listed in The Guinness Book Of Records as the world's oldest degree-granting university. Scholars occasionally call the University of al-Qarawiyyin (name given in 1963), founded as a mosque by Fatima al-Fihri in 859, a university, although some scholars such as Jacques Verger writes that this is done out of scholarly convenience. Several scholars consider that al-Qarawiyyin was founded and run as a madrasa until after World War II. They date the transformation of the madrasa of al-Qarawiyyin into a university to its modern reorganization in 1963. In the wake of these reforms, al-Qarawiyyin was officially renamed "University of Al Quaraouiyine" two years later. The Al-Azhar University was another early university (madrasa). The madrasa is one of the relics of the Fatimid caliphate. The Fatimids traced their descent to Muhammad's daughter Fatimah and named the institution using a variant of her honorific title Al-Zahra (the brilliant). Organized instruction in the Al-Azhar Mosque began in 978.

== Theories of Islamic education ==
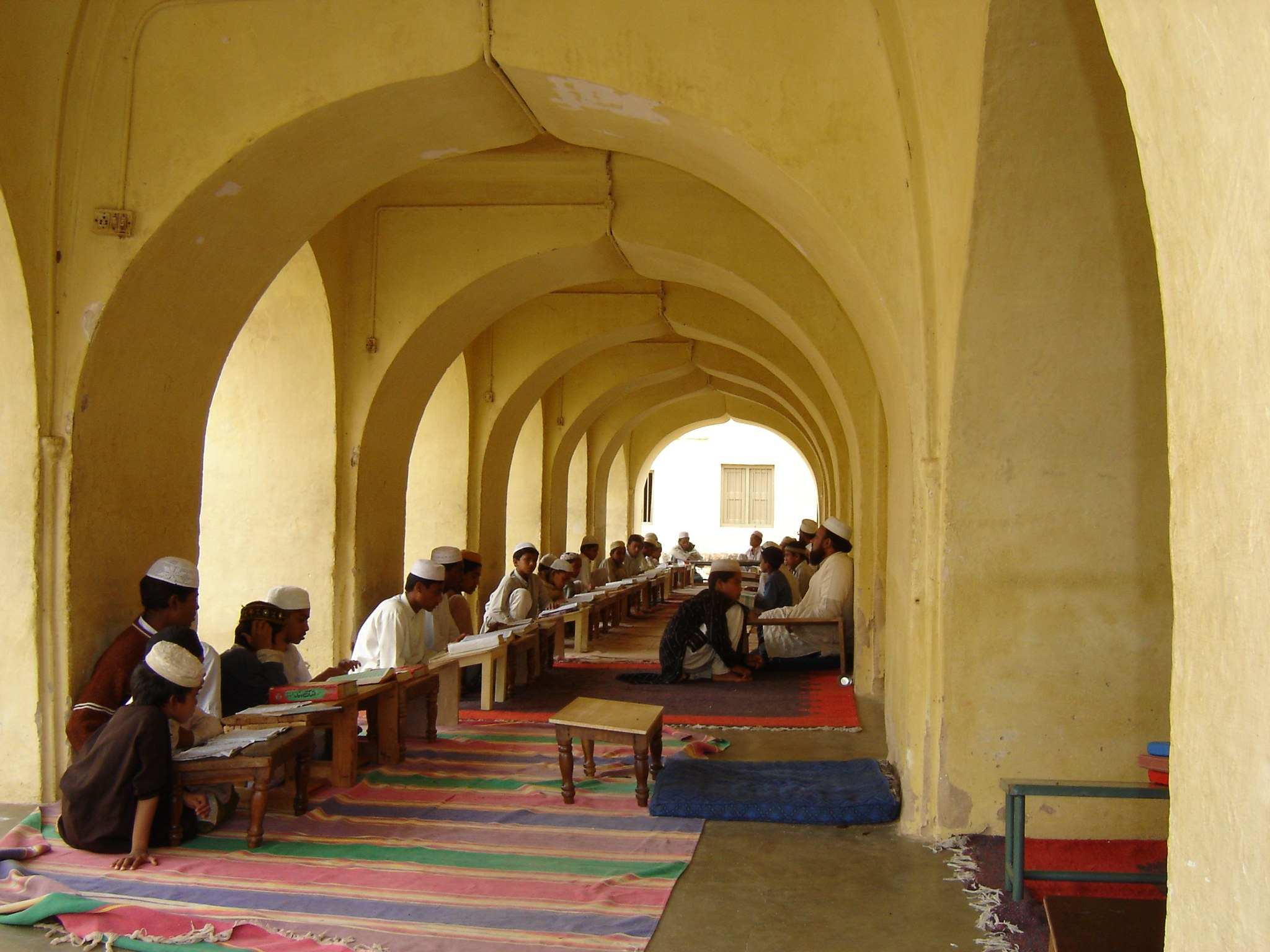
A madarasa of the Jamia Masjid mosque in Srirangapatna, India

Syed Muhammad Naquib al-Attas described the Islamic purpose of education as a balanced growth of the total personality through training the spirit, intellect, rational self, feelings and bodily senses such that faith is infused into the whole personality.

One of the more prominent figures in the history of Islamic education, Abu Hamid Al-Ghazali studied theology and education on a theoretical level in the late 1000s, early 1100s CE. One of the ideas that Al-Ghazali was most known for was his emphasis on the importance of connecting educational disciplines on both an instructional and philosophical level. With this, Al-Ghazali heavily incorporated religion into his pedagogical processes, believing that the main purpose of education was to prepare and inspire a person to more faithfully participate in the teachings of Islam. Seyyed Hossein Nasr stated that, while education does prepare humankind for happiness in this life, "its ultimate goal is the abode of permanence and all education points to the permanent world of eternity".

According to Islam, there are three elements that make up an Islamic education. These are the learner, knowledge, and means of instruction. Islam posits that humans are unique among all of creation in their ability to have 'Aql (faculty of reason). According to the Nahj al-Balagha, there are two kinds of knowledge: knowledge merely heard and that which is absorbed. The former has no benefit unless it is absorbed. The heard knowledge is gained from the outside and the other is absorbed knowledge means the knowledge that raised from nature and human disposition, referred to the power of innovation of a person.

The Quran is the optimal source of knowledge in Islamic education. For teaching Quranic traditions, the Maktab as elementary school emerged in mosques, private homes, shops, tents, and even outside. The Quran is studied by both men and women in the locations listed above, however, women haven't always been permitted in study in mosques. The main place of study for women before the mosques changed their ideology was in their own homes or the homes of others. One well-known woman that allowed others into her home to teach the Quranic traditions was Khadija, Muhammad's wife.

The Organization of the Islamic Conference has organized five conferences on Islamic education: in Mecca (1977), Islamabad (1980), Dhaka (1981), Jakarta (1982), and Cairo (1987).

== Modern education in Islam ==
In general, minority religious groups often have more education than a country's majority religious group, even more so when a large part of that minority are immigrants. This trend applies to Islam: Muslims in North America have more formal years of formal education than Christians. Furthermore, Christians have more formal years of education in many majority Muslim countries, such as in sub-Saharan Africa. However, global averages of education are far lower for Muslims than Jews, Christians, Buddhists and people unaffiliated with a religion. Globally, Muslims and Hindus tend to have the fewest years of schooling. However, younger Muslims have made much larger gains in education than any of these other groups.

There is a perception of a large gender gap in majority Islam countries, but this is not always the case. In fact, the quality of female education is more closely related to economic factors than religious factors. Although the gender gap in education is real, it has been continuing to shrink in recent years. Women in all religious groups have made much larger educational gains comparatively in recent generations than men.

Europe's treatment of education of Muslims has shifted in the last few decades, with many countries developing some sort of new legislation regarding instructing with a religious bias starting in the late twentieth century. However, regardless of these changes, some level of inequality in access to education is still prevalent. In England, there are only five state-funded Muslim schools; this is in contrast to 4,716 state-funded Christian schools. However, there are around 100 private Muslim schools which can instruct on religious education independent of the National Curriculum. In France, on the other hand, there are only two private Muslim schools. There are 30 private Muslim schools in the Netherlands. This is despite the fact that Muslims make up the second largest religious population in Europe, following Christianity, with majorities being held in both Turkey (99%) and Albania (70%).

Pesantren are Islamic boarding schools found in Muslim countries like Indonesia, Malaysia, Thailand and the Philippines. These types of schools have received criticism for their tendency to focus more on religious subjects than secular school subjects, and in fact, pesantren taught primarily religious education until the late 1970s. Due to this focus, some have even accused these schools as being breeding grounds for Islamic extremism and terrorism. Others argue that pesantren teach secular subjects at the same level as any other school, steering students from extremism through education and opening the door for young Muslims of all backgrounds to go on to higher education and become involved in such fields as medicine, law, and the sciences.

Modern education in Islam emphasizes the harmonious integration of religious and secular knowledge, guided by the principle of 'ilm (knowledge), which holds a central place in Islamic teachings. The Quran and Hadith encourage Muslims to seek knowledge throughout their lives, highlighting the value of both spiritual and worldly education. Today, modern Islamic education systems seek to balance traditional religious education with contemporary subjects, preparing individuals for challenges in a globalized world while adhering to Islamic ethical principles. Educational institutions in many Muslim-majority countries have adopted this model, aiming to foster both intellectual and moral development. Also, there are currently many programs in place to prepare Muslim teachers in various Muslim countries, which work to develop teaching skills and religious knowledge. These programs aim to create teachers who positively impact students' lives by promoting strong ethical values, social standards, and professional morals.

In recent years, online platforms have further modernized Quran education, making it accessible globally through digital means. Websites and mobile applications now offer free Quran learning, live tutoring, and interactive tools for both children and adults. One example is Deen Guidance, an online platform that provides free Quran learning and Islamic studies, emphasizing accessibility for students worldwide. Such initiatives reflect a broader shift in modern Islamic education toward integrating technology with traditional learning, promoting inclusivity and lifelong learning opportunities for Muslims around the world.

After 1975 reforms made by the Indonesian government, today many pesantren now include madrasas. Muslim poet and political activist Emha Ainun Najib studied at one of the more famous pesantren, called Gontor. Other notable alumni include Hidayat Nur Wahid, Hasyim Muzadi, and Abu Bakr Ba'asyir.

== Women in Islamic education ==
Educational Mosque on Cairo Citadel

While formal studies in madrasas were open only to men, women of prominent urban families were commonly educated in private settings and many of them received and later issued ijazas (diplomas) in hadith studies, calligraphy and poetry recitation. Working women learned religious texts and practical skills primarily from each other, though they also received some instruction together with men in mosques and private homes.

One of the largest roles that women played in education in Islam is that of muhaddithas. Muhaddithas are women who recount the stories, teachings, actions, and words of Muhammad adding to the isnad by studying and recording hadiths. In order for a man or woman to produce hadiths, they must first hold an ijazah, or a form of permission, often granted by a teacher from private studies and not from a madrasa, allowing a muhaddith or muhadditha permission to transmit specific texts. Some of the most influential muhaddithas are Zaynab bint al-Kamal who was known for her extensive collection of hadiths, A'isha bint Abu Bakr was Muhammad's third wife and she studied hadith from the early age of four. A'isha was well known and respected for her line of teachers and ijazahs allowing her to present information from the Sahih collections of al-Bukhari, the Sira of Ibn Hashim, and parts of the Dhamm al-Kalam from al-Hawari. Rabi'a Khatun, sister of the Ayyubid sultan Salah al-Din paid endowments to support the construction of a madrasa in Damascus, despite the facts that women were often not appointed teaching positions at the madrasas. Because of Rabi'a Khatun's contributions to Damascus, scholarly traffic in the region increased greatly and involvement of female scholars boomed. As a result, female participation in hadith dissemination also grew.

Among the areas in which individual's idiosyncratic views have been adopted and codified as veritable Islamic teaching throughout history include topics that relate to women's place in Islamic education. In some places, Muslim women have much more restricted access to education, despite the fact that this is not a mentioned doctrine in either the Quran or the Hadith.

== See also ==
- Sociology of education
- Islamic attitudes towards science
- Islamic studies
- List of contemporary Muslim scholars of Islam
- Islamic literature
- Islamic advice literature
- Khalwa (school)
- Kuttab
- List of Islamic educational institutions
