= Al-Ashnani =

Primary transmitter of the Qira'at (died 919 CE)

Al-Ashnani Sheikh of the readers in Baghdad
- الأشناني

Personal life
- Born: 841 CE / 227 AH
- Died: 919 CE / 307 AH
- Main interest: Qu'ran
- Known for: Qu'ran recitation, Hadith recitation
- Other name: Ahmed bin Sahel bin Al-Fairouzan Abi Al-Abbas Al-Ashnani

Religious life
- Religion: Islam

Muslim leader
- Teacher: Obaid bin Al-Saba

Al-Ashnani (841 - 919 CE/ 227 - 14th Muharram 307 AH) (Arabic: الأشناني) was a famous qur'an and hadith reciter. He was equally famous in both disciplines. In qu'ran recitation, Al-Ashnani was a student of Obaid bin Al-Saba, and holds a place in many Ijazah lineages.

Al-Ashnani lived for at least part, if not all, of his life in Baghdad. He died at the age of 80 years, by the Islamic calendar. He lived during the time of the Abbasid Caliphate, during the period of the fracture into autonomous dynasties. Baghdad had moved from the capital of a great empire towards a period of declining power at this time.
