= Wahab Iyanda Folawiyo =

Nigerian businessman and philanthropist (1928–2008)

Chief Wahab Iyanda Folawiyo CON
- Born: 16 June 1928; Lagos, Nigeria
- Died: 6 June 2008 (aged 80)
- Education: University of North London
- Occupations: Founder, Yinka Folawiyo Group Nigeria Limited
- Title: Baba Adinni of Nigeria; Chancellor, Lagos State University
- Spouse: Princess Abbah Folawiyo
- Children: Tunde Folawiyo (son)

Chief Abdulwahab Iyanda "Wahab" Folawiyo, CON (16 June 1928 – 6 June 2008) was a Nigerian businessman and philanthropist. In 1957, he founded Yinka Folawiyo & Sons, which has become the parent company of the Yinka Folawiyo Group of Companies. He was born in Lagos to Pa Tijani, a wealthy local merchant, during the British colonial era. He attended the University of North London in 1951, where he read Management, specialising in Ship Brokerage. He returned to start Yinka Folawiyo & Sons, an import and export business. Folawiyo was also the first African-descended Principal Member of the Baltic Exchange in London.

== Yinka Folawiyo & Sons ==
Folawiyo established Yinka Folawiyo and Sons in 1957, a business that later grew to have interest in various sectors of the Nigerian economy. Initially, Folawiyo and Sons developed relationships with building and construction material firms in various Eastern European countries. The group imported cement and sugar from the former Soviet Union, then later introduced building materials from Romania and Bulgaria into the Nigerian market. In 1967, the firm was incorporated as a limited liability company. When Folawiyo and Sons' revenues increased, the firm began chartering vessels to bring in commodities including cement, building materials, frozen fish and fertilizer.

=== Green Lines ===
To provide logistics support for the firm's trading operations, the group established Maritime Associates (International) as a vessel chartering, clearing and forwarding company. The company was later invited to bid for shipment of agricultural produce from Nigeria to Europe. In 1972, the group established Green Lines shipping company when demand for chartering of ocean liners increased. M.V. Ahmadu Tijani, a 10,826 dead-weight ton carrier was purchased in 1973 as the first ocean liner. By 1980, the firm owned six vessels and had joined the UK/West Africa Lines Joint Service and the Continental West Africa Conference. In the 1970s, regular service was provided between Hamburg/Antwerp and Lagos. The firm later acquired M.V. Bello Folawiyo and M.V. Yinka Folawiyo in the mid 1980s.

=== Other business operations ===
- Trans-Atlantic International Lighterage was established in the 1970s, it operated within the Lagos Port Complex providing lighterage service with the use of pontoons and barges.
- In 1971, the United Property Development Company was founded as a real estate investment vehicle.
- The Nigerian Spanish Cement Company was founded as a bulk cement bagging operation with its own deep water berth.
- The firm also invested in farming projects across the country including a rice farm in Rivers State which was established as a cooperation between the group and the Rivers State government. The firm also owned farm estates in Oyo involved in livestock and cultivation of fruits.
- In 1982, the group incorporated a natural energy company to focus on gas recovery and gasoline sales. In 1999, Yinka Folawiyo Power, a subsidiary of the group entered into a partnership with Enron for the development of an independent Power Project. This was the first privately funded power project in Nigeria since the country's independence and after legislation liberalized the sector in 1998. The 270 MW plant became operational in 2001, by then Enron had sold its remaining equity to AES and the Folawiyo Group.

== Philanthropy ==
As a philanthropist, he was active in several social and religious (particularly Muslim) endeavors. He funded the establishment and construction of mosques throughout the country, including both the Lagos Central and Surulere Central mosques in Lagos and the Sultan Bello Mosque in Kaduna. He also funded the Bab Es Salam Home for orphans in Lagos.

== Death ==
He died in the early hours of 6 June 2008, at his residence in Queens Drive, Ikoyi, Lagos, at the age of 79 surrounded by his family. He was buried, by Muslim dictates, on the same day in the Central Mosque's burial ground meant for imams of the mosque; only two other people besides Folawiyo, Imam Ibrahim Otun and Imam Murah, are buried in the cemetery.

== Awards ==
- Doctor of Law by the University of Cross River State, Uyo, 1991,
- Doctor of Letters by Ahmadu Bello University, Zaria, 1992
- Doctor of Science by the Lagos State University, Ojo, Lagos, 1998
- key to Dade County, Florida, in the U.S.
- Millennium Award of Doctor of Science, University of Lagos

== Titles ==
- Baba Adini of Nigeria, a chieftaincy title
- Grand Patron of Nigerian Muslim Council
- Chairman, Executive Council of the Lagos Central Mosque
- Honorary Fellow, Chartered Institute of Transport
- Fellow of the Commonwealth Journalists Association
- Chairman, Maize Association of Nigeria and Patron
- Institute of Freight Forwarders of Nigeria
- Patron of the Nigerian British Chamber of Commerce.
- Chancellor, Lagos State University on 17 April 1999.

== Honours ==
He was conferred the Order of the Federal Republic, OFR, in 1982 and Commander of the Order of the Niger, CON, on 16 November 2000. Warehouse road in Apapa and the Unity road in Ilorin were renamed after Folawiyo.
