= Cornstalk, West Virginia =

Unincorporated community in West Virginia, United States

- Unincorporated community
- Location within West Virginia Location within the United States
- Coordinates: 37°56′46″N 80°31′46″W
- Country: United States
- State: West Virginia
- County: Greenbrier
- Elevation: 2,162 ft (659 m)
- Time zone: UTC-5 (Eastern (EST))
  - Summer (DST): UTC-4 (EDT)
- ZIP code: 24930
- Area codes: 304 & 681
- GNIS feature ID: 1549642

Cornstalk is an unincorporated community in Greenbrier County, West Virginia, United States. Cornstalk is 11 miles (18 km) northwest of Lewisburg.

The community was named after Cornstalk, a leader of the Shawnee nation.
