= George Makdisi =

Professor of Oriental Studies

George Abraham Makdisi was born in Detroit, Michigan, on May 15, 1920. He died in Media, Pennsylvania, on September 6, 2002. He was a professor of oriental studies. He studied first in the United States, and later in Lebanon. He then graduated in 1964 in France from the Paris-Sorbonne University.

He taught in the University of Michigan and Harvard University before reaching the University of Pennsylvania in 1973, as a professor of Arabic. Here he remained until his retirement in 1990, when he held the post of director of the Department of Oriental Studies. He became a Professor Emeritus of "Arab and Islamic Studies" in the University of Pennsylvania in Philadelphia.

He was particularly interested in issues around higher education in the world.

He published an Arabic edition of the work by Ibn 'Aqil, Al-Wāḍiḥ fi Usul al-fiqh (The Obvious in the Principles of Jurisprudence), in three volumes, published in Stuttgart, Germany by Steiner Verlag and reprinted by Klaus Schwarz. He also published an Arabic edition of a portion of Ibn 'Aqil's work, Kitab al-Funun, 2 vols., printed in Beirut 1970-71.

He was a member and honorary member of numerous professional scientific organizations. Among other honors, he was twice a Guggenheim fellow. In 1977, he served as the President of the Middle East Studies Association of North America, now based in Tucson, Arizona, United States.

== Selected works ==
- The Rise of Colleges, 1981
- The Rise of Humanism in Classical Islam and the Christian West: With Special Reference to Scholasticism, 1990: Edinburgh University Press
- Paths to the Middle East Ten Scholars Look Back, 1993
- Editor, Arabic and Islamic Studies in honor of Hamilton A.R. Gibb, 1965: Leiden, Brill.
- Ibn `Aqil: Religion and Culture in Classical Islam, 1997: Edinburgh University Press
