= Gurin Central Mosque =

Mosque in Gurin, Adamawa state, Nigeria

- Masallacin Kara
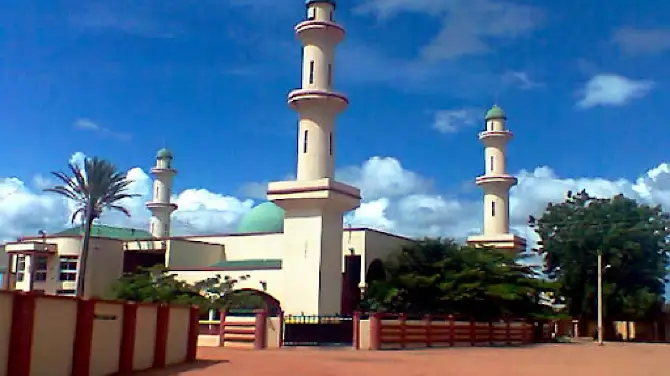

- Location within Nigeria

Religion
- Affiliation: Islam
- Ecclesiastical or organizational status: Mosque
- Status: Active

Location
- Location: Gurin, Fufore, Adamawa State
- Country: Nigeria
- Interactive map of Gurin Central Mosque
- Coordinates: 9°6′43″N 12°53′10″E

Architecture
- Founder: Modibbo Hamman
- Completed: 1806

Specifications
- Dome: 1
- Minaret: 3 (maybe more)

The Gurin Central Mosque (Julurde Jumbare Gurin; Hausa: Masallacin Kara) is a 19th-century mosque located in Gurin, Fufore, in the state of Adamawa, Nigeria.

== Overview ==
In addition to the five daily prayers, the Gurin Central Mosque served as a regular venue for the weekly Friday prayers. It also functioned as a tribunal, a gathering place for official communications, and as a space for organizing and preparing for the Jihad that took place in Fombina beginning in 1809. It was originally built by Modibbo Hamman in 1806 and has gone through numerous renovations and reconstructions. The mosque was built using corn-stalks, hence the name Masallacin Kara (the corn-stalk mosque in Hausa). It was entirely rebuilt using modern materials in 2003 by the late Lamido Aliyu Musdafa.

== History ==
Gurin, a town near the Nigeria-Cameroon border in Fufore, is a hugely important town in Fombina history. It was the first capital of the Adamawa emirate till 1831 when it changed to Ribadu. The town was founded by Fulani pastoralists who settled in the area around 1790. Modibbo Adama, born in 1771, was part of the party that founded the town but he left for Bornu in pursuit of knowledge while they were still wandering. He later came back to find his people settled in Gurin. Adama built a good relationship with Modibbo Hamman, the first ruler of Gurin, likely because they were both Modibbo'en (learned men in Fulfulde) and Mallams (Quranic teachers). Adama even married Hamman's daughter, Yasebo, who later gave birth to Hamidu, the grandfather of Lamido Maigari. Their friendship was so strong that when the Fombina emirate was established in 1809, Modibbo Adama did not change the capital from Gurin till after the death of Modibbo Hamman in 1830.

The Gurin mosque was built by Modibbo Hamman in 1806, two years after the construction of the Gudu mosque which was built to commemorate the beginning of the Sokoto Jihad after its victory in Tabkin Kwatto in 1804. A day was picked every year to rebuild the mosque's fence and this was done by the Fulbe clans in Gurin. A section was assigned to each clan for reconstruction and maintenance. The clans would gather the stalks from their respective farmlands after the harvest season. The roof, however, was rebuilt every four years by the combined efforts of the local Fulbe clans. This was done between the Dhuhr and Asr prayers. Before its reconstruction in 2003, the mosque was approximately 37 by 27 metres (40 by 30 yd) wide.

== Legacy ==
Before its reconstruction using permanent modern materials in 2003, the mosque was basically rebuilt yearly as the corn-stalks only lasted a year. It was maintained by the Muslims of Gurin since its creation in 1806. The Polish historian Zbigniew R. Dmochowski described the mosque:

The remarkable feature concerning the mosque, apart from its architectural value, was the method and organization of its maintenance. Obviously this was determined by the fragility of materials used, but also by punctilious Muslim custom. The whole cornstalk construction was entirely rebuilt every year.

It stood as one of the most ancient historical monuments in Fombina with the people of Gurin being very proud of this heritage. In it can be found, the same pot (restored and reinforced a number of times) from which Modibbo Adama used to perform his wudu for prayers and the baobab tree that he stood under to deliver Uthman dan Fodio's message regarding the jihad in Fombina and his appointment as Lamido Fombina. The five daily prayers and the weekly Friday prayer have been observed there consistently since 1806. Even Muslims from Cameroon regularly visit the mosque to observe their prayers.

The iconic mosque influenced the original structure of the Yola Central Mosque, built in 1847, as Lamido Lawal wanted it to be constructed "in the true likeness of Adama's first mosque in Gurin".

=== Myths ===
When the mosque was still built using corn-stalks, it was believed that every stalk had specific mystical or therapeutic benefits. The renovation of the mosque, initiated in 2002 and finished in 2003, sparked significant controversy within the Gurin community. Local oral tradition held a belief that the mosque would collapse within four years if it were reconstructed using anything other than corn-stalk. However, despite these concerns, the mosque has remained intact and continues to be actively utilized as of 2023.

It was also believed that the sand inside the mosque glowed at night but lost this ability over time due to the immoralities of the community living around the mosque. Regarding this myth, in 2016, Alhaji Ibrahim Muhammadu Yero, the Wakili (District Head) of Gurin remarked "I am 77 years old now, and have never witnessed that since I was born".

== See also ==
- Islam in Nigeria
- List of mosques in Nigeria
