= Toby Huff =

American academic (born 1942)

Toby E. Huff (born April 24, 1942) is an American academic and emeritus professor at the University of Massachusetts Dartmouth. He was born in Portland, Maine. He was trained as a sociologist but has research interests in the history, philosophy and sociology of science. He has published Weber-inspired studies of the Arab and Muslim world, as well as China, including field work in Malaysia. He is best known for his book The Rise of Early Modern Science: Islam, China and the West. Now in a third edition, it has been translated into Arabic (twice), Chinese, Korean, and Turkish. His explanation of the cultural and scientific divergence between Arabic/Islamic and European science in the medieval period has been widely influential, especially among economic historians such as Richard Lipsey, Jan Luiten van Zanden, Peer Vries, among others.

Huff's sociological approach to the European development, its legal transformation, along with the rise of the universities and modern science has been incorporated in several mainstream history texts.

== Career and contributions ==
Huff earned a B.A. from Northeastern University and a Master's from Northwestern University. He completed a Ph.D. from The New School For Social Research in 1971, where he was mentored by Benjamin Nelson. He completed a post-doctoral fellow at the University of California, Berkeley working with Robert Bellah, and was a member of the Institute for Advanced Study in Princeton, New Jersey from 1978 to 1979.

Huff has been a visiting scholar at the National University of Singapore, the University of Malaya, and the Max Weber College in Erfurt, Germany. He taught sociology for thirty-four years at the University of Massachusetts Dartmouth before becoming chancellor professor emeritus in 2005. Since then he has been a research associate in the Department of Astronomy at Harvard University.

== Publications ==
- On the Roads to Modernity. Conscience, Science, and Civilizations, Selected writings of Benjamin Nelson (1981)
- Max Weber and the Methodology of the Social Sciences (1 ed.). Transaction Publishers. 1984. ISBN 978-0878559459.
- Huff, Toby E. (2017). The Rise of Early Modern Science: Islam, China and the West (3rd ed.). Cambridge University Press. ISBN 978-1107571075.
- Max Weber and Islam. Transaction Publishers. 1999. ISBN 978-1560004004. Co-authored with Wolfgang Schluchter.
- Huff, Toby (2007). Abattouy, Mohammad (ed.). "Understanding the Place of Science in Islamic Civilization". In les Sciences dans les Sociétés Islamiques. abdul-AzizFondation du Roi: 101–120. doi:10.13140/2.1.4152.8322.
- An Age of Science and Revolutions, 1600-1800. Oxford University Press. 2005. ISBN 978-0195177244.
- Jarvie, Ian; Mitford, Karl; Miller, David, eds. (2006). "The Open Society, Metaphysical Beliefs, and Platonic Sources of Reason and Rationality". Karl Popper. A Centenary Assessment. 2: 19–44. ISBN 978-1848901919.
- "Some Historical Roots of the Ethos of Science," Journal of Classical Sociology, 7/2 (2007)
- Intellectual Curiosity and the Scientific Revolution. A Global Perspective. Cambridge, England: Cambridge University Press. 2010. ISBN 978-0-521-17052-9.
- Huff, Toby (2022). "Max Weber's Comparative and Historical Sociology of Law: The Developmental Conditions of Law." In The Routledge International Handbook on Max Weber, edited by Alan Sica. London: Routledge, pp. 339–352.
- Huff, Toby (2020). "Europe as a Civilization and the Hidden Structure of Modernity." In European Integration. Historical Trajectories, Geopolitical Costs, edited by Johann P. Arnason (Edinburgh: Edinburgh University Press), pp. 14–33.
