= Zaynab bint al-Kamal =

Hadith scholar and teacher from Damascus

Zaynab bint al-Kamāl (646-740 AH/1248-1339 AD) was a hadith scholar and teacher from Damascus. Her full name was Um Abdullah Zaynab bint Ahmad b. Abdulraheem al-Maqdisiya al-Dimashqiya, but biographers and historians more commonly refer to her under name Zaynab bint al-Kamāl.

== Early life ==
Zaynab bint al-Kamāl began collecting ijazahs very early. At only the age of one, she received her first ijazah from ‘Abd al-Khāliq al-Nishtibrī followed by two more from Ibn al-Sayyadī and ‘Ajība al-Bāqadriyya. At the age of two she obtained an additional certificate from Habiba bint Abi Umar. By the time she was six years old, she had received the written permission for the transmission of knowledge from scholars from Aleppo, Alexandria, Cairo, Harran, and al-Sham. Between the ages of 6 and 12, she visited many assemblies held by the scholars of her time and received the exclusive right for transmission of the works she had heard. The scholars were confident in transmitting their knowledge to Zaynab even though she was so young. It seems that many believed this girl would grow to become an eminent scholar later in her life.

Collecting her first ijazah at only a year old, Zaynab bint al-Kamāl's gathering of ijazahs occurred extremely and unusually early. This suggests that there must have been someone orchestrating her introduction into the muhadditha life. However, biographers do not mention who this person is. It is thought that it may have been her father, Ahmad Kamāl al-Dīn al Maqdisī, who may have not been mentioned due to him never acquiring the reputation of religious scholar. Though, it is also suspected that her uncle, who is known to have been respected for his hadith transmission, could have been the person who initiated her into this practice.

== Later life ==
Although there are not many published sources detailing Zaynab bint al-Kamāl's life from her early teenage years to the age of 60, mention of her begins to occur once more in reference to her later years. These sources speak of the impressive number and importance of hadith collections transmitted by Zaynab. She was also known to transmit mashyakhas. The Mu’jam al-Samā’āt al-Dimashqiyya, where Damascene certificates were cataloged, names Zaynab bint al-Kamāl as a presiding authority of a majlis al-sama thirty-four times.

Documentation from Ibn Hajar indicates that Zaynab bint al-Kamāl never married. It also tells us that she suffered from ophthalmia, though it did not seem to impair her career. By the time Zaynab died at the age of 94, it is said that she was in possession of a considerable amount of ijazahs. She was an exceptionally respected muhadditha, earning the title musnidat al-Sham.

== Location ==
It is worth mentioning that Zaynab bint al- Kamāl lived in al-Salihiyya, a suburb of Damascus. The thriving area was known for its focus on religious study. Much of this study, it is documented, was thanks to many contributions from scholarly Muslim women. As such, Zaynab's legacy as a muhadditha was not unusual in the area. The setting was ideal for her success and rise to prominence.

== Mentioning by Imam ibn Katheer ==
In the handwriting notes Imam ibn Katheer left a message that he had heard Zaynab bint al-Kamāl's recitation of Muwatta by Imam Malik in the Hanabilah Mosque near Mount Qasioun in Damascus.
