= Ibrahim Ahmad Maqary =

Nigerian religious leader (b. 1976)

Ibrahim Ahmad Sa'idu Maqari
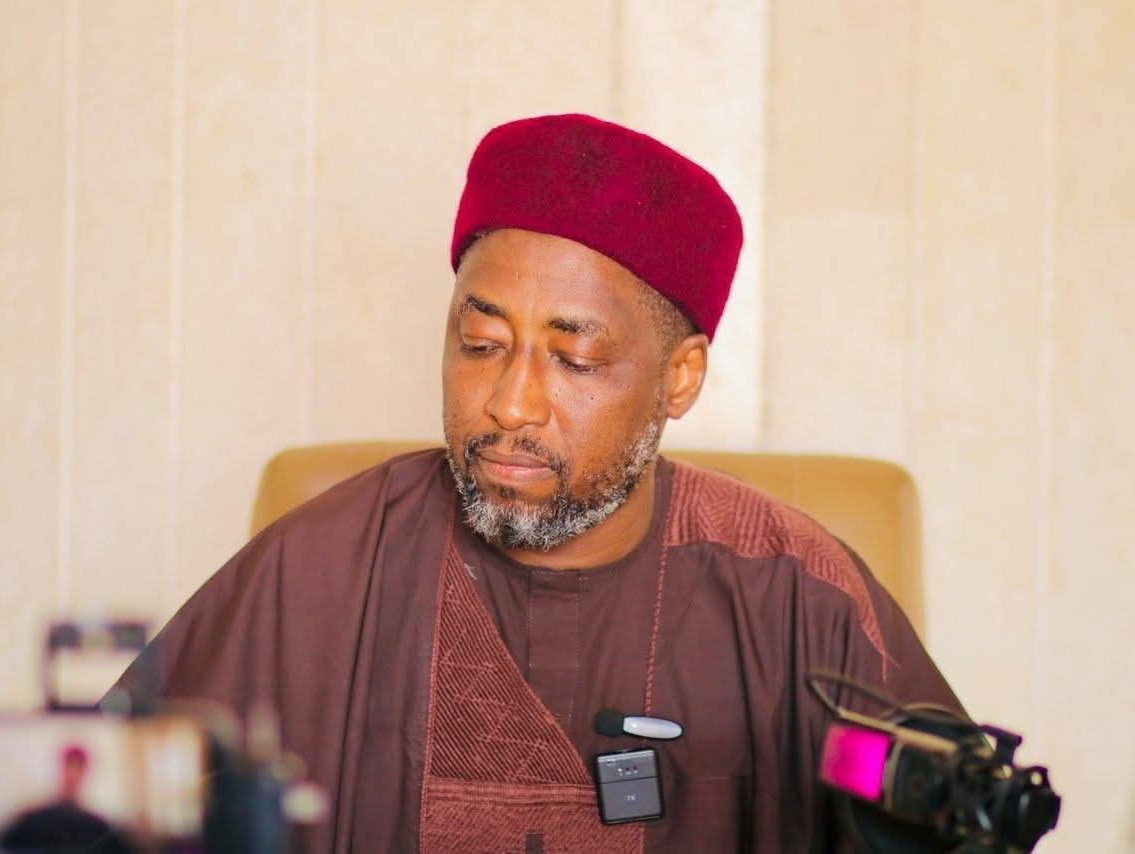
- Born: Ibrahim Ahmad Sa'idu Maqari; September 15, 1976 (age 50); Zaria, Kaduna State, Nigeria
- Other names: Ibrahim Ahmad Makari; Ibrahim Ahmad Maqary
- Education: Al-Azhar University; Ahmadu Bello University; Bayero University Kano
- Occupations: Islamic scholar, academic, Chief imam
- Known for: Chief Imam of the Abuja National Mosque; Professor of Arabic and linguistics; founder, Tazkiyyah Educational initiatives
- Title: Professor
- Website: https://sheikhmaqary.com.ng

Sheikh Ibrahim Ahmad Sa'idu Maqari (also spelled Maƙari or Maqary; born 15 September 1976) is a Nigerian Islamic scholar, academic and cleric. He is a professor of Arabic and linguistics who serves as the chief imam of the Abuja National Mosque. Maqari is known for religious teaching, Qurʾānic exegesis, institution building in Islamic education and participation in national religious councils in Nigeria.

== Early life and education ==
Maqary was born September 15, 1976, in Zaria, Kaduna State, Nigeria. He was raised in a Muslim family that valued education. His early education began at local Quranic schools, where he memorized the Quran and learned the fundamentals of Islamic teachings. His parents sent him to further his studies at Islamic institutions across West Africa, including those in Senegal and Mauritania. Maqari completed formal studies at Al-Azhar University, Cairo, graduating from the Department of Arabic Language. Sources indicate he later completed postgraduate study in Nigeria, including a doctorate at Bayero University Kano (PhD, 2009).

== Academic career ==
Upon returning to Nigeria after studies abroad, Maqari joined the university system and lectured in Arabic language and related fields. He was promoted through academic ranks and is reported to have attained the rank of professor of Arabic and linguistics (reported c. 2017). Maqari has delivered lectures and participated in conferences both within Nigeria and internationally; several institutional profiles and directories cite his scholarly output and use of his work in thesis research.

== Teaching and mentorship ==
Maqary has been involved in teaching and mentoring young scholars. He has served as a teacher in various madrasat (Islamic schools) and has held lectures and seminars across Nigeria and other parts of Africa. His teachings cover a range of Islamic subjects, including Fiqh (Islamic jurisprudence), Tafsir (Quranic exegesis), and Hadith (Prophetic traditions).

== Religious leadership and public roles ==
Maqari has served as an imam at the Abuja National Mosque, where, since a 2012/2017 restructuring of the mosque’s leadership, a small group of senior imams have led prayers and delivered Friday sermons on a rotational basis. Media profiles and institutional biographies list Maqari among the senior imams (sometimes described as deputy or co-equal imams) who lead services at the National Mosque in Abuja.

Maqari is also recorded as a member of national Islamic bodies and advisory assemblies, including the Supreme Council for Islamic Affairs and the Assembly of Muslims in Nigeria (as listed in institutional profiles).

== Institutional initiatives and philanthropy ==
Maqari is associated with a cluster of educational and philanthropic initiatives often named under the "Tazkiyyah / Tazkiyah" brand (Tazkiyyah Educational Resource Center, Tazkiyah schools and related orphan support schemes). Institutional profiles credit him with founding or chairing multiple education projects, primary/secondary schools and orphan support initiatives.
