= 2009 in aviation =

This is a list of aviation-related events in 2009.

== Events ==
During the year, the airlines Aeromak, City Link Air, FlyMontserrat, KentuckySkies, Mint Airways, and Trawel Fly are established, the airlines Air Arabia Maroc, Arik Niger, and Nile Air commence flight operations, and Sol Dominicana Airlines ceases operations.

=== January ===
- The Kiribati airline Coral Sun Airways is established.
- The Federal Aviation Administration revokes the Operating Certificate of American airline Air Tahoma.

6 January

- Ted, a brand of the American airline United Airlines for their economy flights, is discontinued. Economy flights are rebranded under the main United Airlines brand.

10 January

- The Zambian airline Zambian Airways suspends operations.

15 January

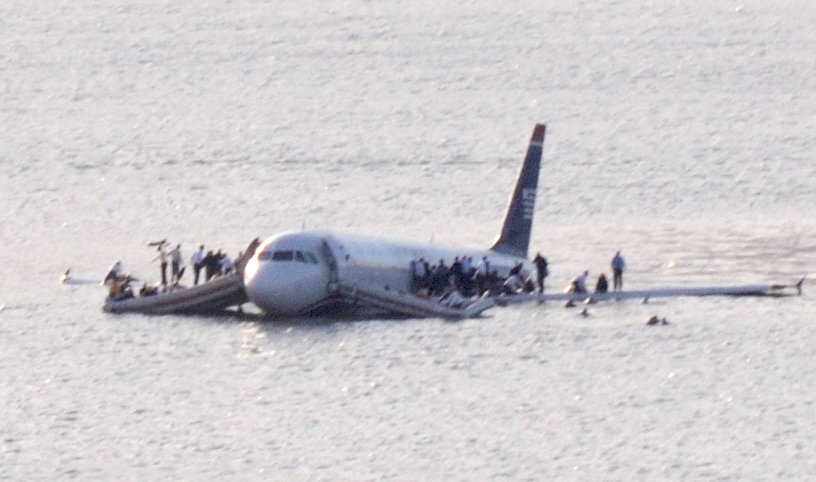
US Airways Flight 1549

- Two Ilyushin Il-76 aircraft of the Russian Air Force collide on the ground at Uytash Airport, Makhachkala, Dagestan killing four of the seven crew.
- US Airways Flight 1549, an Airbus A320-214 (N106US) with 155 people aboard flies into a flock of Canada geese just after takeoff from New York City's LaGuardia Airport and ditches in the Hudson River after both engines are disabled by birdstrikes. All passengers and crew are rescued, and only five people are injured.

17 January

- A Eurocopter AS 532 helicopter of the French Navy crashes into the sea off Gabon shortly after take-off from the amphibious assault ship Foudre, killing eight of the ten personnel on board.
- The bankrupt Lithuanian airline FlyLAL-Lithuanian Airlines ceases operations.

20 January

- The Dominican Civil Aviation Institute suspends Caribair from operating for "operational irregularities".

25 January

- The operating licence of Swedish airline Nordic Airways is suspended, the Swedish Transport Agency stating that the airline is "no longer able to fulfill its commitments and duties to its passengers."

27 January

- FedEx Express Flight 8284 operated by Empire Airlines, an ATR 42-320-Cargo, registration N902FX, crashes short of the runway at Lubbock Preston Smith International Airport in the United States, and is destroyed in the subsequent fire.

29 January

- The Australian airline MacAir Airlines enters voluntary administration and ceases operations.

=== February ===
- The British airline Skysouth ceases operations.

7 February

- PT-SEA, an Embraer EMB 110-P1 Bandeirante operated by Manaus Aerotáxi, crashes into the Manacapuru River, Brazil killing 24 of the 28 people on board.

12 February

- Colgan Air Flight 3407, a DHC-8-402 Q400, registration N200WQ, crashes at Clarence Center, New York, killing all 50 people on board and another on the ground.

22 February

- The Australian airline SkyAirWorld suspends operations pending a restructure of its business.

25 February

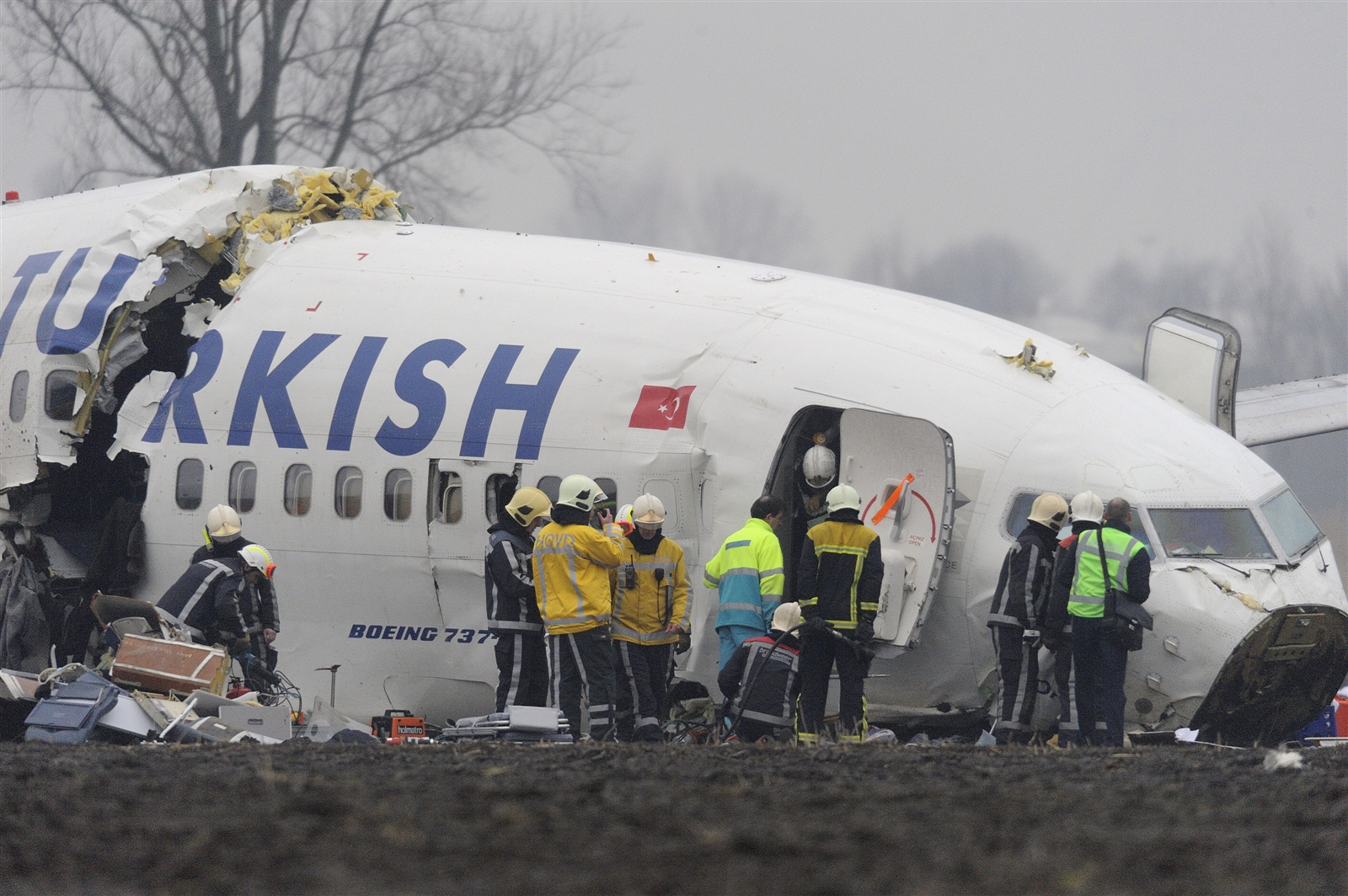
Turkish Airlines Flight 1951

- Turkish Airlines Flight 1951, a Boeing 737-8F2, registration TC-JGE, crashes short of the runway at Schiphol Airport, Amsterdam. Six passengers and three crew members are killed.

=== March ===
- Iraqi Airways begins its first service to Sweden since the outbreak of the Gulf War in January 1991, flying from Baghdad to Athens to Stockholm using a Boeing 737-200 leased from Seagle Air.

12 March

- Cougar Helicopters Flight 91, a Sikorsky S-92A, registration C-GZCH, ditches in the Atlantic Ocean off Canada, killing 17 of the 18 people on board.

13 March

- The Mexican airline MexicanaLink commences operations.

20 March

- Emirates Flight 407, an Airbus A340-500, registration A6-ERG, suffers a tailstrike during its take-off run at Melbourne Airport, Australia. Although take off is achieved, the aircraft overruns the end of the runway and destroys some 200 metres (220 yd) of strobe lights on the ground. The damaged aircraft dumps fuel and makes a safe landing at Melbourne. The investigation found that an incorrect weight value was entered into the aircraft's computer, resulting in an incorrect calculated take-off speed.

23 March

- FedEx Express Flight 80, a McDonnell-Douglas MD-11, registration N562FE, crashes on landing at Narita International Airport, Tokyo, killing both crew members.

25 March

- A Bell 206L-4 Longranger helicopter of Medair crashes at Mount Keş, Turkey, killing all six people on board.

=== April ===
April

1 April

- Eurocopter AS332 L2 Super Puma Mk2 G-REDL of Bond Offshore Helicopters crashes in the North Sea off Scotland after the main rotor gearbox failed and all four main rotor blades were lost. All 18 people on board are killed.

6 April

- A Fokker F27 of the Indonesian Air Force crashes into a hangar at Husein Sastranegara International Airport, killing 24 people. A CASA CN-235 and CASA C-212 Aviocar are substantially damaged by falling debris and two Boeing 737s slightly damaged.

15 April

- The Russian Federal Air Transport Agency cancels the operating license of airline Elbrus-Avia.

17 April

- Mimika Air Flight 514, operated by Pilatus PC-6 PK-LTJ crashes into Mount Gergaji, Indonesia, killing all ten people on board.

19 April

- Canjet Flight 918, operated by Boeing 737-800 C-FTCZ is hijacked at Sangster International Airport, Jamaica. The lone hijacker is overpowered by members of the Jamaica Defense Force.
- The Russian airline Arkaim is established.

24 April

- The Senegalese airline Air Sénégal International suspends all operations.

29 April

- Air Arabia Maroc is founded. It will begin flight operations on 6 May.

=== May ===
- The Indonesian airline Megantara Air suspends operations.

1 May

- The Fijian airline Air Fiji ceases operations.

3 May

- EV 08114, a Mil Mi-35 operated by the Venezuelan Army crashes at Táchira, Venezuela, killing all 21 personnel on board.
- XM715, a Handley Page Victor, briefly becomes airborne during a fast taxi run at Bruntingthorpe Aerodrome, United Kingdom. The aircraft is not airworthy and was not intended to have flown. YouTube video

6 May

- Air Arabia Maroc begins flight operations. Its first flight is from Casablanca, Morocco, to London Stansted Airport in the United Kingdom.

20 May

- A Lockheed C-130 Hercules of the Indonesian Air Force crashes at Magetan killing 97 people on board the aircraft and a further two on the ground.

=== June ===
- The Egyptian airline AlMasria Universal Airlines commences operations.

1 June

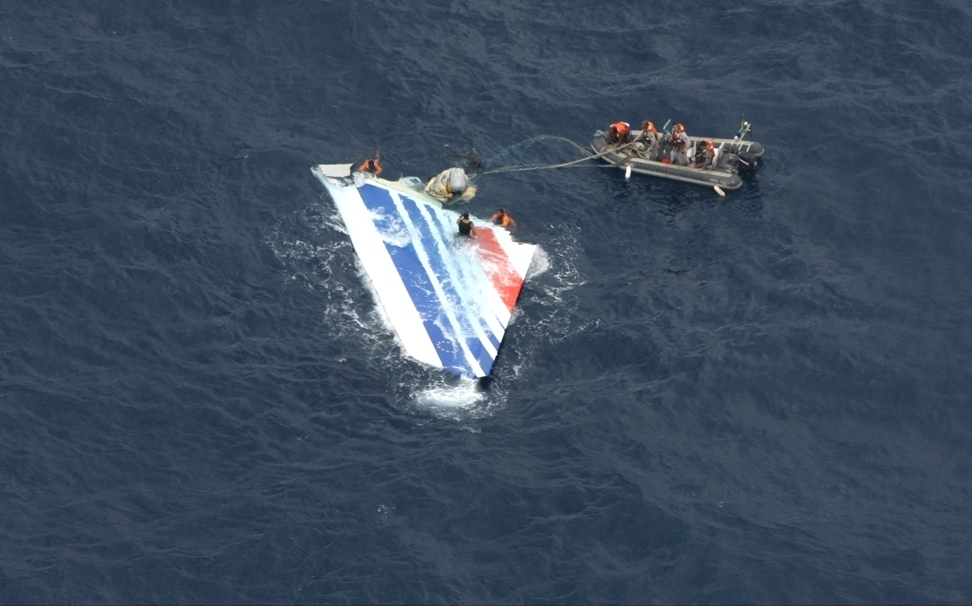
Air France Flight 447

- Air France Flight 447, an Airbus A330-200, registration F-GZCP, crashes into the Atlantic Ocean off the coast of Brazil killing all 228 people on board.
- Swedish airline Air Express Sweden is taken over by MCA Airlines

30 June

- Yemenia Flight 626, an Airbus A310-324, registration 7O-ADJ, crashes into the Indian Ocean near the Comoros Islands. There is one survivor from the 153 people on board.

=== July ===
3 July

- A Mil Mi-17 operated by the Pakistan Army crashes in the Federally Administered Tribal Areas, killing all 43 people on board.

13 July

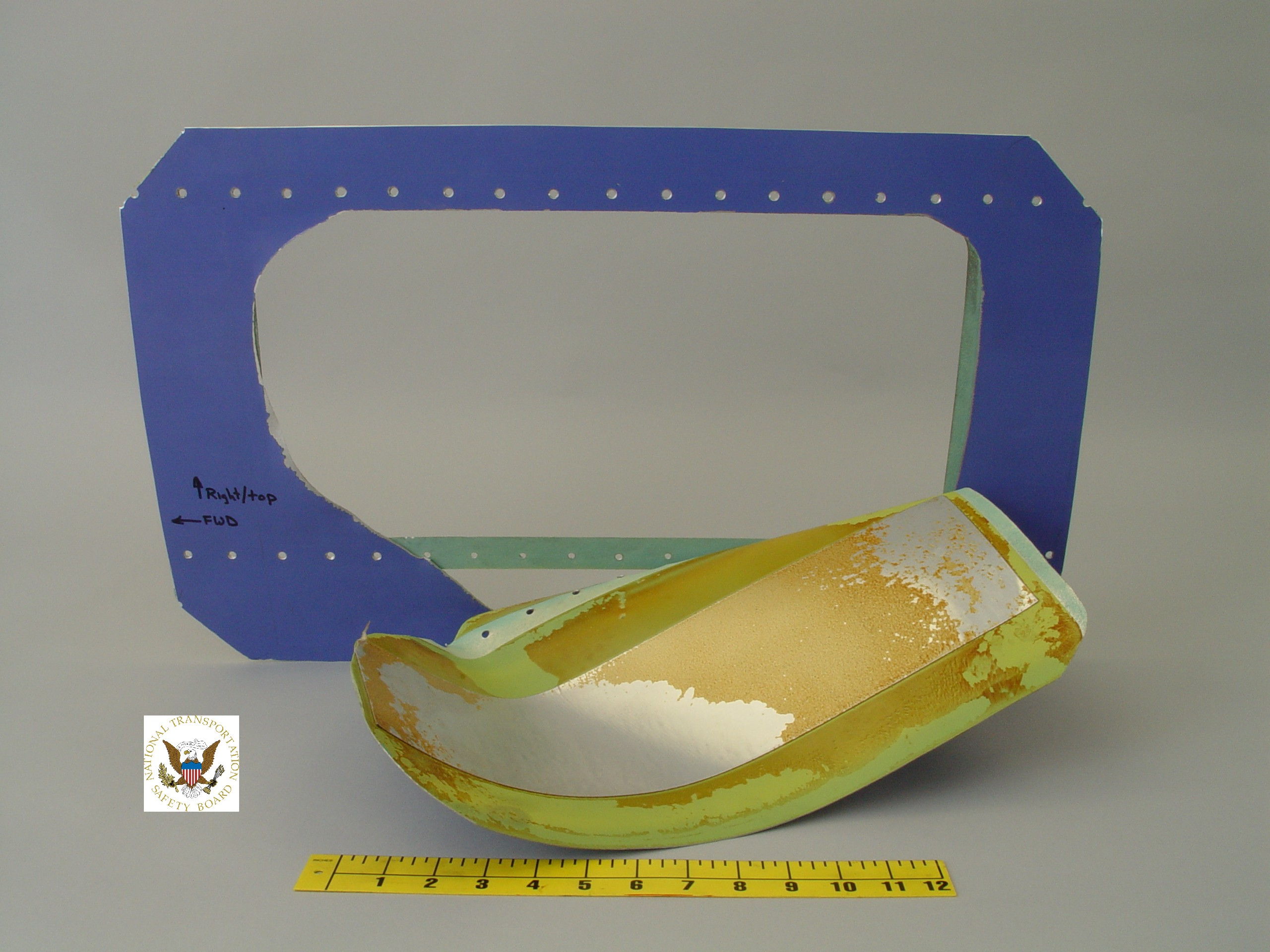
Southwest Airlines Flight 2294

- Southwest Airlines Flight 2294, a Boeing 737-3H4, registration N387SW, suffers a structural failure of the fuselage in flight and subsequent decompression. An emergency landing is successfully made at Yeager Airport, United States.

14 July

- American airline Pet Airways commences operations.
- Airfast Indonesia, Garuda Indonesia, Mandala Airlines and Premiair are removed from the European Commission blacklist.

15 July

- Caspian Airlines Flight 7908, a Tupolev Tu-154, registration EP-CPG, crashes at Jannatabad, Iran, after an in-flight fire on board. All 168 people on board are killed.
- The Spanish low-cost airlines Clickair and Vueling complete their merger, with Clickair absorbed into Vueling.

24 July

- The Italian Civil Aviation Authority suspends the operating licence of MyAir due to financial problems and service failures.
- Aria Air Flight 1525, an Ilyushin Il-62, registration UP-I6208, crashes on landing at Mashhad International Airport, Iran, killing 16 of the 143 or more people on board.

28 July

- The Cambodian airline Cambodia Angkor Air commences operations.

=== August ===
2 August

- Merpati Nusantara Airlines Flight 9760, a DHC-6 Twin Otter 300, registration PK-NVC, crashes at Oksibil, Indonesia killing all 16 people on board.

4 August

- Bangkok Airways Flight 266, an ATR 72-212A, registration HS-PGL, overruns the runway at Samui Airport, Thailand, and crashes into a disused control tower, killing one of the 72 people on board.

7 August

- The Canadian airline Island Express Air commences operations.

8 August

- N71MC, a Piper PA-32R, and N401LH, a Eurocopter AS350 collide mid-air over New York. Both aircraft crash into the Hudson River, killing all three people on board the aircraft and all six people on board the helicopter.

11 August

- Airlines PNG Flight 4684, operated by DHC-6 Twin Otter P2-MCB, crashes into a mountain in the Owen Stanley Range, Papua New Guinea, killing all 13 people on board.

14 August

- Air Australia commences operations.

16 August

- Two Sukhoi Su-27 aircraft of the Russian Knights are involved in a mid-air collision while practicing a display for the 2009 MAKS Airshow. One pilot is killed as well as one person on the ground.

23 August

- The Danish airline Wings of Bornholm commences operations.

27 August

- The Chinese airline East Star Air declares bankruptcy.
- The Russian airline Avianova begins operations.

31 August

- The Slovak airline SkyEurope files for bankruptcy.
- The U.S. Evergreen 747 Supertanker, the world's largest aerial firefighting aircraft, see its first service in the United States, fighting the Oak Glen Fire in California.

=== September ===
1 September

- The Slovak airline SkyEurope suspends operations.

2 September

- A Bell 430 helicopter crashes at Rudrakonda Hill, India, killing all five people on board, including Y. S. Rajasekhara Reddy, Chief Minister of Andhra Pradesh.

8 September

- The Russian airline KD Avia suspends flight operations.

9 September

- Aeroméxico Flight 576, a Boeing 737-852, registration EI-DRA, is hijacked and landed at Mexico City International Airport, its intended destination. Five people are detained, one of whom is later identified as the hijacker.
- The Egyptian airline Air Arabia Egypt announces that operations will start in late 2009 or early 2010.

14 September

- Lufthansa Flight 288, a Fokker 100 operated by Contact Air, registration D-AKFE, makes an emergency belly landing at Stuttgart Airport, Germany, after the undercarriage fails to deploy correctly.

19 September

- The Maltese airline Efly commences operations.

22 September

- 5–8208, an Ilyushin IL76-MD operated by the Islamic Republic of Iran Air Force is involved in a mid-air collision with a Northrop F-5E Tiger II and crashes near Varamin killing all seven people on board.

24 September

- South African Airlink Flight 8911, a BAe Jetstream 41, registration ZS-NRM, crashes shortly after take-off from Durban International Airport due to an engine failure. The aircraft is destroyed but the three crew members survive with serious injuries.

29 September

- Greek state-owned airline Olympic Airlines ceased operation. It was replaced by privately owned Olympic Air, which commenced operations on this day.

30 September

- The Serbian airline Jat Airways suspends flights due to a maintenance company refusing to work on their aircraft in a dispute over unpaid bills.

=== October ===
- American airlines Go! and Mokulele Airlines merge to form Go! Mokulele.
- The Greek airline Viking Hellas commences operations.

2 October

- The Serbian airline Jat Airways resumes flights following the resolution of the dispute with their maintenance company.
- The Swedish airline Feel Air is established.

21 October

- Azza Transport Flight 2241, a Boeing 707-320, crashes shortly after take-off from Sharjah International Airport, United Arab Emirates. All six crew are killed.
- Northwest Airlines Flight 188, an Airbus A320-212 with 149 people on board, lands in Minneapolis, Minnesota, an hour late after its pilots overshoot Minneapolis when they become distracted by a discussion of their schedules.

23 October

- The Slovak airline Seagle Air ceased operations.

24 October

- Continental Airlines and Copa Airlines leave the Skyteam airline alliance.

27 October

- Continental Airlines joins the Star Alliance airline alliance.

29 October

- A Lockheed C-130 Hercules owned by the United States Coast Guard collided with a Bell AH-1W Super Cobra owned by the United States Marine Corps killing all nine occupants onboard both aircraft.

=== November ===
1 November

- An Ilyushin Il-76 operated by the Russian Ministry of Internal Affairs crashed shortly after take-off from Mirny Airport. All eleven crew are killed.

10 November

- Mexicana, MexicanaClick, and MexicanaLink join the Oneworld airline alliance.

11 November

- The Swedish airline MCA Airlines declares bankruptcy.

12 November

- RwandAir Flight 205 operated by Canadair CRJ-100 5Y-JLD ended up embedded in the departure building at Kigali International Airport after an engine malfunction. One passenger was killed.

27 November

- The European Commission extends its blacklist to cover all airlines based in Djibouti, the Republic of the Congo and São Tomé. In Ukraine, Ukrainian Cargo Airways and Volare Airlines were removed from the blacklist as their Air Operator's Certificates had been revoked. Motor Sich Airlines were also removed from the blacklist and Ukrainian-Mediterranean Airlines were allowed to operate a single aircraft. TAAG Angola Airlines was allowed to increase the number of aircraft used for flights to Portugal.

28 November

- Avient Aviation Flight 324, operated by McDonnell Douglas MD-11F Z-BAV, crashed on take-off from Shanghai Pudong International Airport on a flight to Bishkek–Manas International Airport, Kyrgyzstan with the loss of 3 lives. The plane was written off.

=== December ===
8 December

- In the United Kingdom, Coventry Airport announces that it is to close with immediate effect due to its owners being wound up in the High Court.

9 December

- Brussels Airlines joins the Star Alliance.

16 December

- Scotland's largest airline, Flyglobespan, enters administration and ceases all flights.

18 December

- Continental Micronesia inaugurates new service from Guam and Honolulu to Nadi, Fiji.

21 December

- The Spanish airline Air Comet ceases operations.

22 December

- American Airlines Flight 331, a Boeing 737-800, overshoots the runway on landing at Norman Manley International Airport, Kingston, Jamaica, injuring 15 of the 154 people on board.

25 December

- Northwest Airlines Flight 253, operated by Airbus A330-323E N820NW is subjected to an attempted terrorist attack. The terrorist, Nigerian Islamist Abdulfarouk Umar Muttalab, is overpowered by other passengers and is arrested when the aircraft lands at Detroit Metropolitan Wayne County Airport.

== Deaths ==
13 January

- Australian aviator Nancy Bird Walton, 93.

8 February

- American aviator Wesley L. McDonald, 84.

2 June

- British Air Vice-Marshal John Ernsting, 81.

20 June

- American aviator Kenneth L. Reusser, 89.

18 July

- British World War I veteran and last surviving founding member of the Royal Air Force, Henry Allingham, 113.

== First flights ==
25 April

- Boeing P-8 Poseidon

21 October

- BAE Systems Mantis

12 November

- AgustaWestland AW159 Wildcat

13 November

- AgustaWestland AW149

25 November

- Gulfstream G650.

3 December

- First Solar Impulse aircraft, HB-SIA.

4 December

- Eurocopter EC175

9 December

- Elbit Hermes 900

11 December

- Airbus A400M, in Spain.
- Gulfstream G250.

15 December

- Boeing 787 Dreamliner, in Seattle.

== Entered service ==
- Evergreen 747 Supertanker, fighting a fire in Spain's Province of Cuenca.

== Retirements ==
- 31 July – Cessna T-37 Tweet by the United States Air Force

== Commenced operations or founded ==
- AeroCaribe de Honduras
- Aerolíneas Estelar
- KentuckySkies
- Trawel Fly
- Arik Niger
- Air Kasthamandap
- Air Mekong
- AIS Airlines
- Al Wafeer Air
- ArGo Airways
- Aviatrans Kiev
- Belle Air Europe
- BlueWay Offshore
- Cello Aviation
- Eurex Airlines
- Flairjet
- Fly540 Angola
- Guna Airlines
- I-Fly
- Jota Aviation
- Korongo Airlines
- Kyrgyz Trans Avia
- LaMia Venezuela
- Madina Air
- Makalu Air
- Maluti Sky
- Medallion Air
- Noar Linhas Aéreas
- Norsk Helikopterservice
- Primera Air Scandinavia
- Rayyan Air
- Simrik Airlines
- Syrian Pearl Airlines
- Tara Air
- Tarco Air
- Ten Airways
- Tropic Ocean Airways
- Velvet Sky
- Uni-Top Airlines
- Ultimate Jet
- January - Coral Sun Airways
- February - LANCO
- 27 February - V Australia
- March - MAT Airways
- 13 March - MexicanaLink
- 1 April - California Pacific Airlines
- 3 April - Happy Air
- May - Skylan Airways
- 6 May - Air Arabia Maroc
- 28 May - FlyMontserrat
- 29 May - Gianair
- June - AlMasria Universal Airlines
- 1 June - LOT Charters
- 3 June - Mint Airways
- 16 June - Qatar Executive
- 16 June - Veteran Avia
- July - Royal Air Maroc Express
- 14 July - Pet Airways
- 28 July - Cambodia Angkor Air
- 7 August - Island Express Air
- 14 August - Air Australia
- 23 August - Wings of Bornholm
- 27 August - Avianova
- 19 September - Efly
- 29 September - Olympic Air
- October - go! Mokulele
- October - Viking Hellas
- 2 October - Feel Air
- 13 October - Amjet Executive
- 16 October - Trai Thien Air Cargo
- November - Deccan 360
- November - SkyAir
- 1 November - Nile Air
- 30 November - AlbaStar
- December - Air Sweden
- December - Jet Asia Airways
- December - Magma Aviation
- 7 December - Jamaica Air Shuttle
- 18 December - Tafa Air
- 29 December - ASTA Linhas Aéreas
- 31 December - SF Airlines

== Ceased operations ==
- Sol Dominicana Airlines
- Air Tahoma
- Ukrainian Cargo Airways
- Volare Airlines
- Malift Air
- 6 January – Ted
- 10 January – Zambian Airways
- 17 January – flyLAL-Lithuanian Airlines
- 20 January – Caribair
- 25 January – Nordic Airways
- 29 January – MacAir Airlines
- February – Skysouth
- 22 February – SkyAirWorld
- 15 March – East Star Airlines
- 1 April – Aerotur-KZ Airlines
- 15 April – Elbrus-Avia
- 24 April – Air Sénégal International
- May – Megantara Air
- 1 May – Air Fiji
- 1 June – Air Express Sweden
- 15 July – Clickair
- 24 July – MyAir
- 1 September – SkyEurope
- 8 September – KD Avia
- 29 September - Olympic Airlines
- October – Bellview Airlines
- 23 October – Seagle Air
- 11 November – MCA Airlines
- 23 November – Imair Airlines
- 16 December – Flyglobespan
- 21 December – Air Comet

== Deadliest crash ==
The deadliest crash of this year was Air France Flight 447, an Airbus A330 which crashed in the mid-Atlantic Ocean on 1 June, killing all 228 people on board.
