= MAT Macedonian Airlines =

Macedonian airline from 1994 to 2009

IATA	ICAO	Call sign
IN	MAK	MAKAVIO
- Founded: 1994
- Ceased operations: 1 September 2009
- Operating bases: Ohrid Airport; Skopje Airport
- Fleet size: 1
- Destinations: 7
- Headquarters: Skopje, North Macedonia
- Key people: Zlatko Petrovski (President)
- Website: www.mat.com.mk

MAT Macedonian Airlines (Macedonian: Македонски Авиотранспорт (МАТ), tr: Makedonski Aviotransport (MAT)) was the national flag carrier airline of the Republic of Macedonia (now North Macedonia). It operated scheduled services between Skopje and Ohrid and several destinations in Europe. It was based in Skopje with its main base at Skopje International Airport.

== History ==
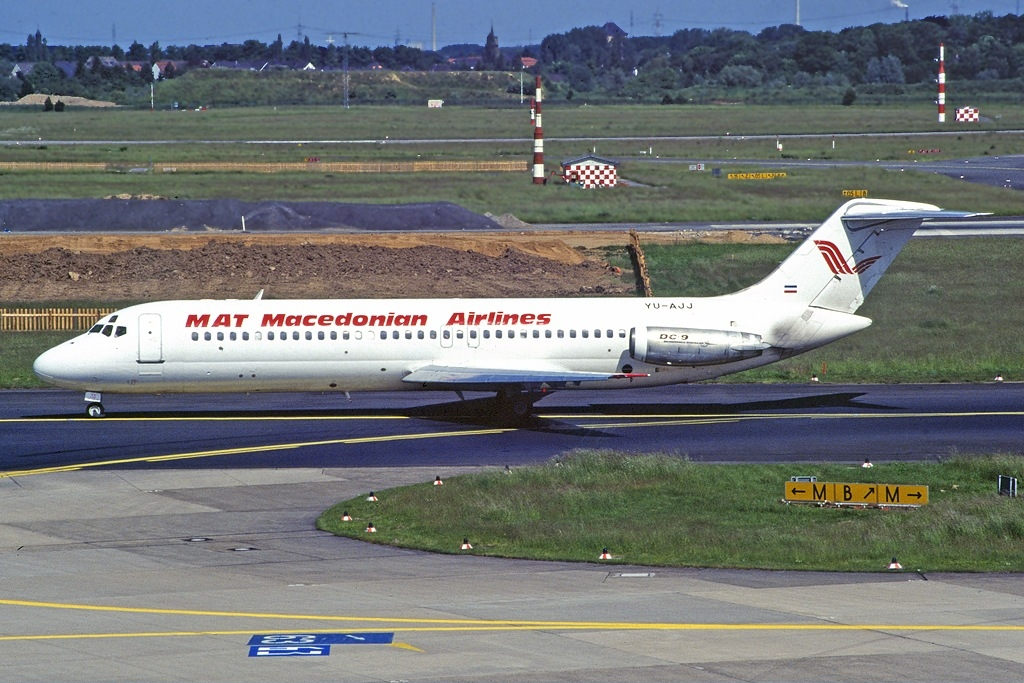
MAT Macedonian Airlines McDonnell Douglas DC-9 leased from JAT at Düsseldorf Airport in 199.

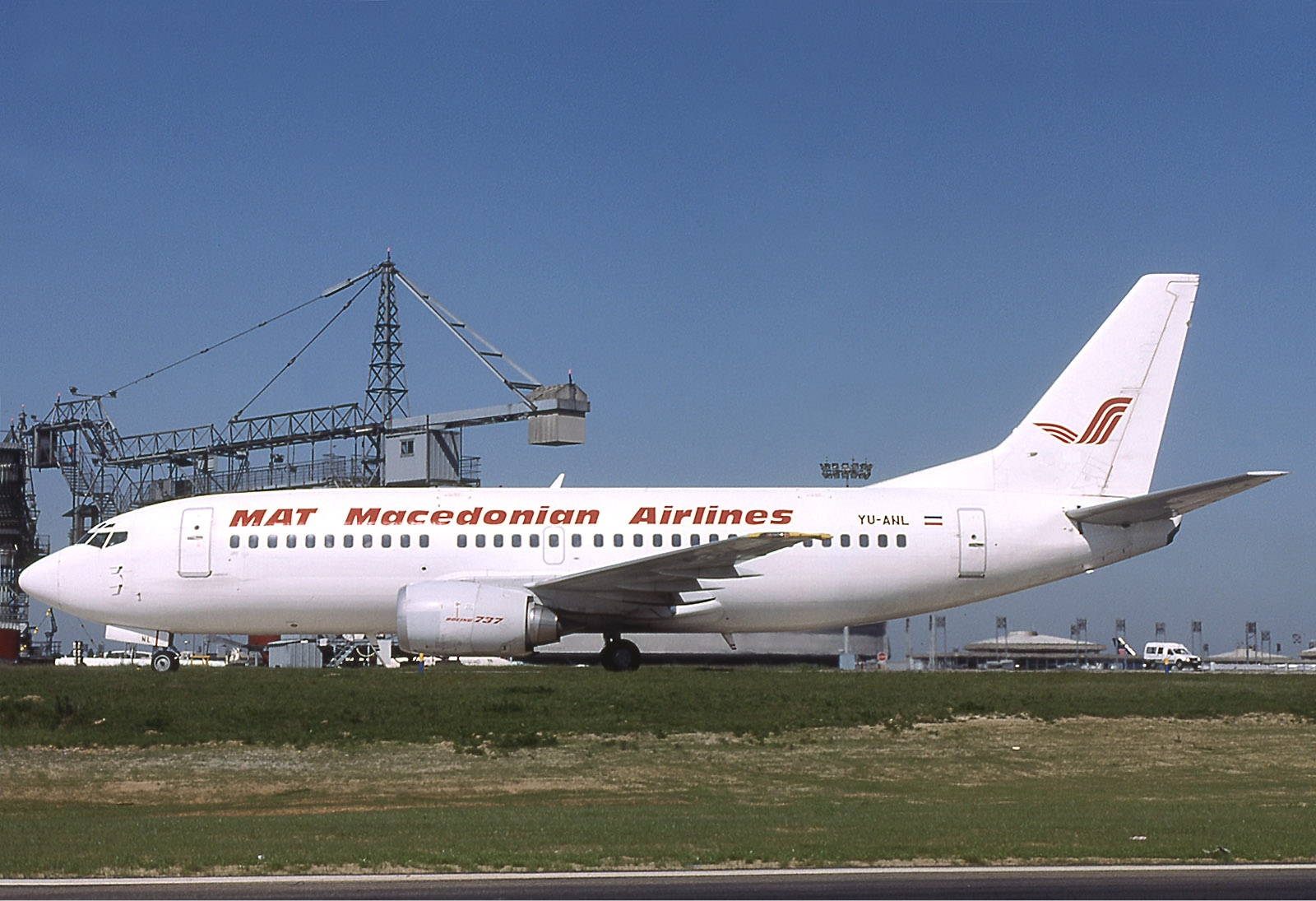
MAT Macedonian Airlines Boeing 737-300 leased from JAT in 1997

Macedonian Air Transport was established on 16 January 1994 and started operations on 23 June 1994 flying from Skopje to Zürich using a Boeing 737-200.

In 2000, the Government of the Republic of Macedonia signed an agreement with MAT that gave MAT the status of national flag carrier for the following 10 years. MAT Macedonian Air Transport is a share holding private Company, owned by two major stockholders.

In 2007, MAT introduced electronic tickets available for purchase over the internet.

=== Final years (2008–2009) ===
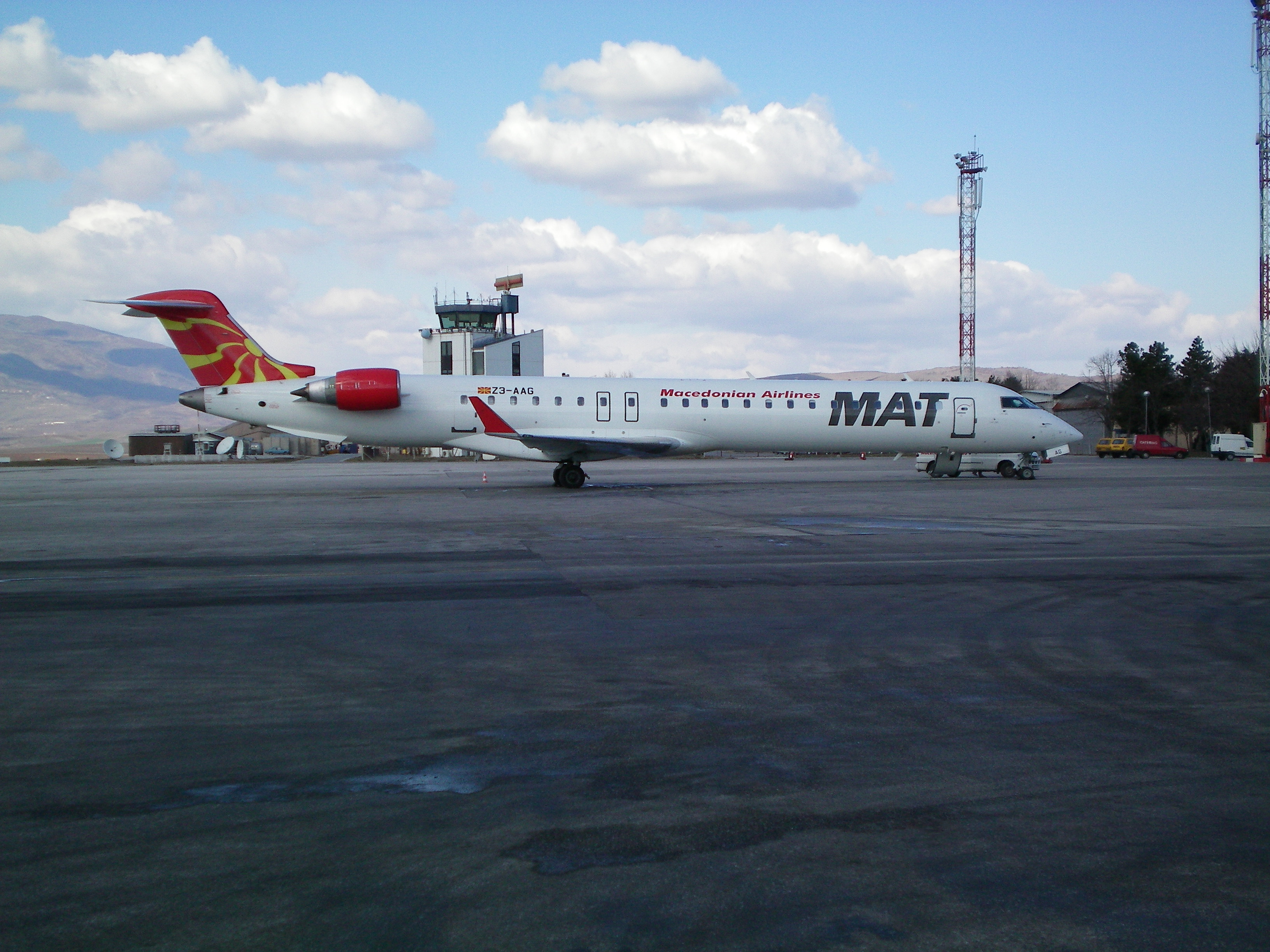
MAT Macedonian Airlines Bombardier CRJ-900 at Skopje Airport, Republic of Macedonia. (2008)

On 31 October 2008, MAT received its first Boeing 737-500. The aircraft had 126 seats divided in two cabin classes (business and economy) and 4 tons capacity for baggage and cargo. The registration of the aircraft was Z3-AAH and it carried MAT traditional colors.

In December 2008, the airline was forced to give up its services from Skopje to Berlin, Düsseldorf, Hamburg and Rome after Eurocontrol banned the carrier from entering German and Italian airspace because of unpaid air traffic control fees from the period 1999 to 2005.

MAT Airlines was also banned from Greek airspace, because of the Macedonia naming dispute. In 2009, the Greek and Macedonian states agreed on their aircraft entering each other's airspace, but Macedonian registered aircraft could not land in any Greek airports.

In 2009, MAT dismissed 70 of 180 employees and changed its airplanes to reduce costs.

On 20 March 2009, Jat Airways, the national flag carrier airline of Serbia, announced its intentions of taking over a majority of shares in MAT Macedonian Airlines.

On 14 May 2009, a Boeing 737-500 was grounded by Macedonian CAA and stored at Belgrade Nikola Tesla Airport until 4 July 2009.

On 1 September 2009, MAT Macedonian Airlines lost its Air Operators Certificate (AOC).

== Planned takeover by Jat ==
MAT Macedonian Airlines and Jat Airways signed the Intention agreement on finding the best business solution for the future cooperation between the two national carriers of Macedonia and Serbia. Both companies stated that the interest is shown for establishing various forms of cooperation, from technical to commercial.

In the year 2008 Alexander the Great Airport provided service to more than 660.000 passengers while MAT served 37 per cent on the flights to Zurich, Vienna, Düsseldorf, Rome, Istanbul, Hamburg, Berlin and Amsterdam and Jat served 10 per cent. By improving the companies’ partnership, services for the Macedonian passengers will gain additional possibilities.

The agreement was signed in Belgrade by Jat Acting Director General Sasa Vlaisavljevic and the president of MAT's Board of Directors, Zlatko Petrovski.

Despite MAT recently being grounded by aviation authorities in Macedonia, Jat's CEO has confirmed that the Serbian carrier will take over shares and revive the national Macedonian carrier. Jat's team of legal experts are currently in Skopje where they are checking MAT's legal and financial documentation. These checks should be complete within a week. The findings will be presented to Jat's management board, after which, the Serbian carrier will send MAT a proposal whether it will take over a majority of shares (over 50%) or less than 50% of shares. The documentation checks have taken longer than expected because MAT did not immediately provide all the necessary paperwork. Also, Jat's legal team requested more information regarding MAT's financial reports. Jat's CEO confirmed that MAT has extreme debt but declined to comment further. He stated that Jat is primarily interested in the Macedonian aviation market which is covered 35% by MAT, while Jat has a share of 10% in the market. “We are also interested in commencing flights from Belgrade and Skopje to Priština through MAT”, Saša Vlaisavljević, the airline's CEO says. Jat is currently banned from flying to Priština due to the unresolved status of Kosovo in which Priština is located.

In October 2009, Jat Airways does not have any intentions with MAT Macedonian Airlines, instead they have planned an airline for Republic of Macedonia called Aeromak.

== Destinations ==
MAT Macedonian Airlines operated the following service (at May 2009):

=== Europe ===
- Austria
  - Vienna - Vienna International Airport
- North Macedonia
  - Ohrid - Ohrid St. Paul the Apostle Airport Base
  - Skopje - Skopje Alexander the Great Airport Base
- Netherlands
  - Amsterdam - Amsterdam Airport Schiphol
  - Maastricht - Maastricht Airport
- Serbia
  - Belgrade - Belgrade Nikola Tesla Airport
- Switzerland
  - Zürich - Zürich Airport

=== Terminated destinations ===
MAT Macedonian Airlines also operated flights to Czech Republic, Denmark, Germany, Hungary Italy, Luxembourg, Spain, Sweden, Switzerland, and Turkey until December 2008:

- Czech Republic -Prague
- Denmark -Copenhagen
- Germany - Berlin-Tegel, Düsseldorf, Frankfurt, Hamburg, Stuttgart, Karlsruhe
- Hungary -Budapest
- Italy - Rome-Fiumicino, Milan,
- Luxembourg - Luxembourg
- Spain - Madrid, Palma de Mallorca
- Sweden - Gothenburg, Stockholm
- Switzerland -Geneva
- Turkey -Istanbul

== Fleet ==
The MAT Macedonian Airlines fleet included the following aircraft (at 1 September 2009):

MAT Macedonian Airlines Fleet
Aircraft	Total	Seats	Notes
Boeing 737-500	1	126	Sold to MAT Airways in 2010
