= Seagle =

Seagle may refer to:

== Surname ==
- Chandler Seagle (born 1996), American baseball catcher
- Oscar Seagle (1877–1945), American musician and teacher
- Steven T. Seagle (born 1965), American writer of comic book

== Other ==
- Seagle Building, American historic building in Gainesville, Florida
- Seagle Air, Slovakian charter airline company
