= People and Pets Dog Airlines =

Airline of the United States

People and Pets Dog Airlines LLC
- Founded: June 2014
- Fleet size: 1
- Headquarters: Houston, Texas, United States
- Website: defunct

People and Pets Dog Airlines LLC (doing business as PawFund Animal Rescue) was a company based in Houston, Texas. The company originally intended to begin for-hire flights transporting dogs and cats in 2015 after obtaining the required FAA certification. People and Pets operated one aircraft, a Cessna 150, based at West Houston Airport. The company asserted it was the only "pet-only" airline operating their own flights, as opposed to the now defunct Pet Airways that operated using multiple contracted air carriers. People and Pets began charity animal rescue flights on March 1, 2015.

== History ==
People and Pets was founded by a thirteen-year-old in June 2014 after a stressful experience shipping his dog on another airline in 2009. Their first aircraft was acquired in April 2014. People and Pets began their charity flights (PawFund) on March 1, 2015. In June 2016, the company suspended their plans to launch for-hire flights. As of February 2017, the company appears to be defunct.

== PawFund ==
PawFund was the charitable division of People and Pets providing free animal transportation to animal rescue groups. People and Pets Dog Airlines began operating PAWfund flights on March 1, 2015, prior to the launch of for-profit operations.

== Ground transport ==
On April 21, 2015, the company announced the launch of a new division providing ground transportation called People and Pets Animal Transportation. The service was launched in May 2015, but was temporarily suspended shortly thereafter. As of March 2016, the division remains closed.
