= Sol Airlines =

Sol Airlines can refer to the following:

- Sol Air, later renamed AeroHonduras, a now defunct airline from Honduras
- Sol Dominicana Airlines, a start-up airline from the Dominican Republic
- Sol Líneas Aéreas, a regional airline from Argentina

== See also ==
- Skol Airlines
