= Slovak Airlines =

Airline of Slovakia (1995–2007)

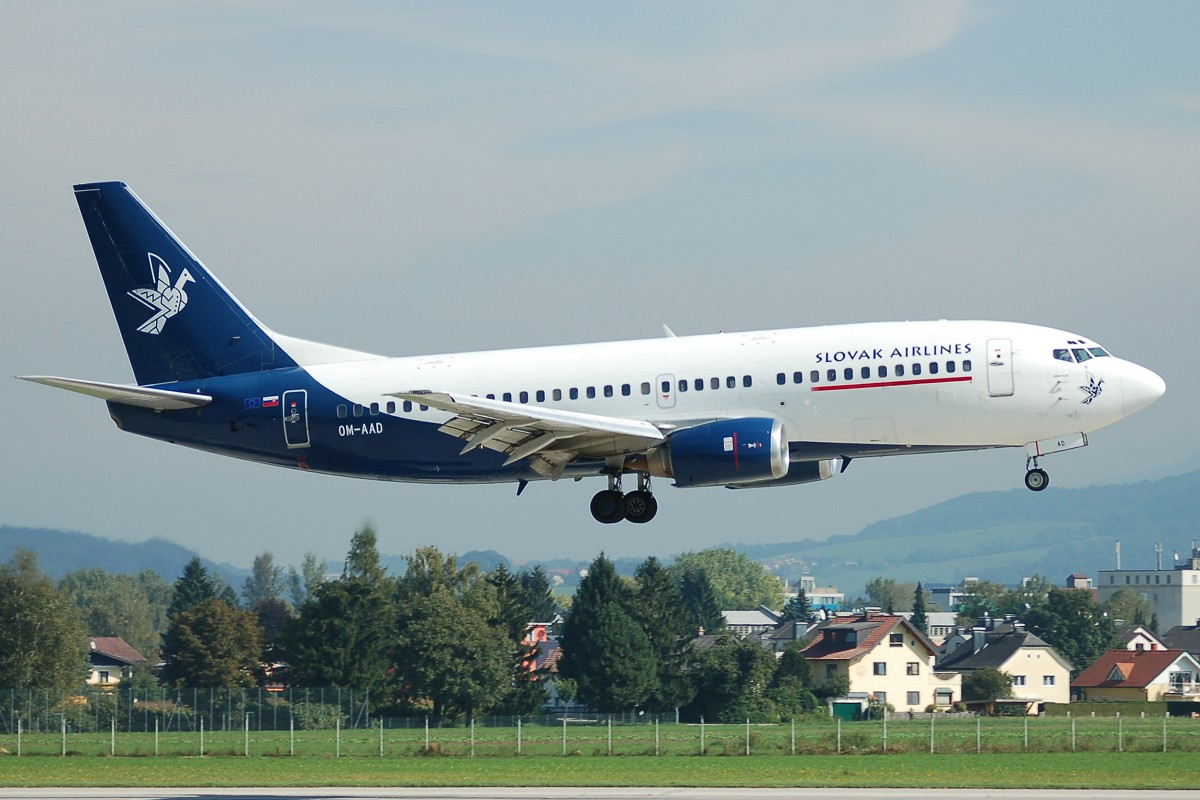
- A Slovak Airlines Boeing 737-300
IATA	ICAO	Call sign
6Q	SLL	SLOV LINE
- Founded: 1995
- Ceased operations: February 2007
- Hubs: M. R. Štefánik Airport Bratislava
- Frequent-flyer program: Miles & More
- Alliance: Star Alliance (affiliate; 2005–2007)
- Fleet size: 3 (May 2006)
- Destinations: 37 scheduled + 22 charter
- Parent company: Austrian Airlines (2005–2007)
- Headquarters: Bratislava, Slovakia
- Profit: SKK –57 million (2006)
- Employees: 147 (2006)
- Website: slovakairlines.sk/corpus/index_en.csp (archived)

Slovak Airlines (Slovenské aerolínie a.s.) was an airline based in Bratislava, Slovakia. Slovak Airlines operated on the market as an air transport company, operating regular and irregular passenger, cargo and postal transit. It was the flag carrier of the Slovak Republic operating a scheduled service across Europe. It also offered international charter flights to Bulgaria, Cyprus, Greece, Italy, Russia, Spain, Tunisia, and Turkey. The company also ran wet-lease operations. Its main base was M. R. Štefánik Airport in Bratislava.

The airline ceased operations in February 2007.

== History ==
After the Dissolution of Czechoslovakia on January 1, 1993, the Slovak Republic found itself in a specific situation in the area of air transport, in that no transport company remained and even in the past there had never been an effective network of airlines directly connecting Slovakia with the rest of the world. Not a single aircraft or foreign embassy remained in Slovakia, which was a big problem in building international relations for the young republic.

A way out of the problem for the young government with Michal Kováč had been to build a transport company ensuring the connection of Slovakia with foreign countries and to resolve the entire conception of air transport, in particular in connection with tourism and the creation of an infrastructure.

In 1995 the mission of the International Civil Aviation Organisation (ICAO) on a visit to Slovakia proposed the creation of a national air transport company as one possibility of the development of civil aviation. After almost one year of intensive discussions experts agreed on the idea that it would be possible to create a strong, high quality airline company in Slovak conditions only in the form of a national airline company. The result of this endeavor was on 24 June 1995 the designation of the company Slovenské aerolínie as the national air transport company. The business plan of Slovak Airlines began with the construction of a basic network of lines over a period of 5 years and started operations in May 1998. Within the framework of the Phare programme “Air Operation Safety Improvement”, Slovak Airlines was selected as one of three operators within the states of Eastern Europe as a sample transport company and consultant in the creation of a programme of improving safety of air transport in the Phare countries.

In January 2005 Austrian Airlines acquired the majority stake (62%) in the company. Slovak Airlines ceased operations after Austrian Airlines repossessed two aircraft having withdrawn financial support in January 2007. The company filed for bankruptcy on 2 March 2007. Large portion of employees and offices was taken over by the now-defunct Seagle Air.

== Destinations ==
At end of service, the airline flew scheduled services from Bratislava to Brussels (8 weekly, Fokker 100) and Moscow Sheremetyevo (4 weekly, codeshare Aeroflot, Fokker 100).

Previously, the airline has operated flights to Moscow with its own Tu-154 and Boeing 737 airplanes, and cooperated with Austrian Airlines via codeshare on flights from Bratislava to Brussels, Paris CDG and London Gatwick.

In 2006 the airline flew the following charter flights from Bratislava (with Boeing 737-300):

- Bulgaria: Burgas
- Cyprus: Larnaca
- Egypt: Hurghada, Sharm el Sheik
- Greece: Heraklion, Chania, Karpathos, Korfu, Kos, Rhodos, Thessaloniki
- Jordan: Aqaba
- Montenegro: Tivat
- Spain: Palma de Mallorca
- Tunisia: Monastir
- Turkey: Antalya, Dalaman

And from Košice (with Boeing 737-300):

- Bulgaria: Burgas
- Egypt: Hurghada
- Greece: Heraklion, Chania, Korfu, Kos, Rhodos, Thessaloniki
- Montenegro: Tivat
- Turkey: Antalya

The airline also flew for Italian travel agencies a weekly Brescia - Rhodos service with the Boeing 737 - 300 aircraft. The smaller 100-seat Fokker 100 was used on the following charter flights for Greek travel agencies: Bratislava - Thessaloniki, Thessaloniki - Chania, Chios, Kos, Rhodos, Samos, Santorini.

== Fleet ==
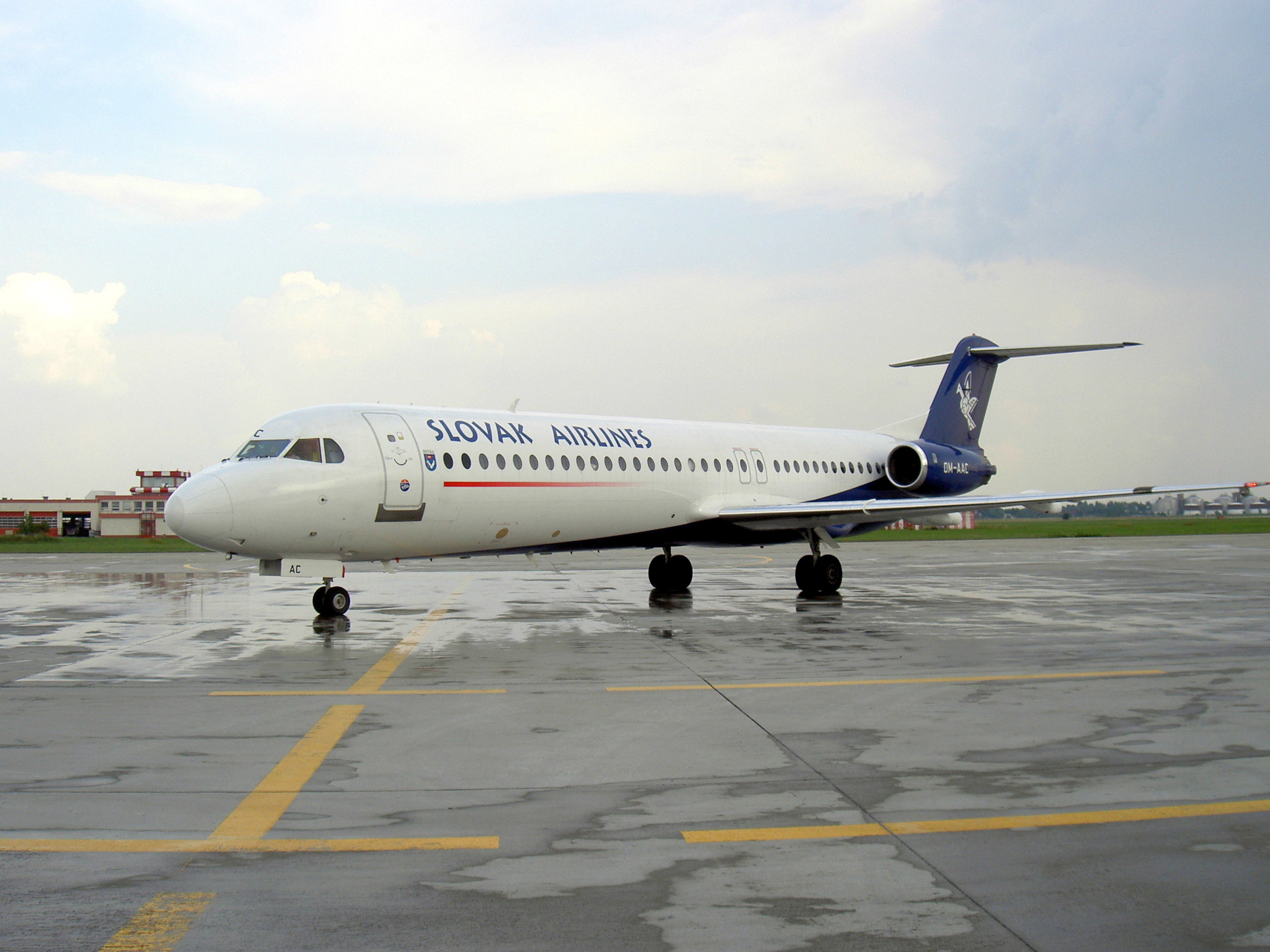
Slovak Airlines Fokker 100

Slovak Airlines operated the following aircraft:

Aircraft	In service	Passengers			Years of operation	Notes
Aircraft	In service	B	E	Total	Years of operation	Notes
Boeing 737-300	3	0	148	148	2004; 2002-2007; 2005-2007	
Boeing 767-200	1	12	203	215	2004-2005	
Fokker 100	2	0; 12	105; 85	105; 97	2005; 2005-2007	
Saab 340A	1	0	34	34	1998-2000	
Tupolev Tu-154M-100	3	16; 0	131; 157	147; 157	1998-2003	OM-AAC painted with TV Markíza sticker
Total	10					
