= East Star Airlines =

Chinese airline

East Star Airlines 東星航空

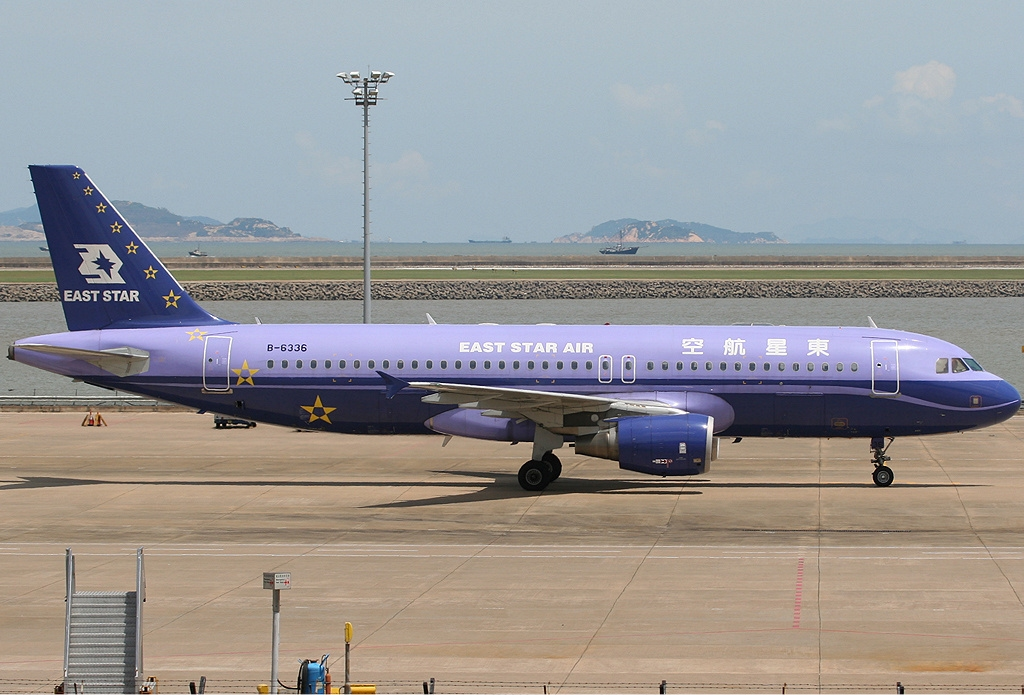
- East Star Airlines Airbus A320-200
IATA	ICAO	Call sign
8C	DXH	EAST STAR
- Founded: 2005
- Ceased operations: 15 March 2009
- Operating bases: Wuhan Tianhe International Airport
- Parent company: East Star Airlines Company Limited
- Headquarters: Wuhan, Hubei, China
- Website: eaststar-air.com (archived)

East Star Airlines (Chinese: 東星航空) was an airline based in Wuhan, Hubei, China. It was a privately owned airline and operated scheduled domestic services on 10 routes from Wuhan, and was expected to add more routes as its fleet grew. Its main base was at Wuhan Tianhe International Airport.

== History ==
Its inaugural flight was from Wuhan to Shenzhen using its first Airbus A319.

In July 2007, it was granted rights to operate international services after only a year of service, the first privately owned Chinese airline to be granted permission to operate international flights before Civil Aviation Administration of China's (CAAC) requirement of three-year service.

On 15 March 2009, the airline announced that it was suspending its flights indefinitely. On 30 March 2009, the airline was liquidated by the Wuhan Mid-Court.

On 27 August 2009, the airline officially went bankrupt, after the Intermediate People's Court of Wuhan rejected its last restructuring plan because the investment firm ChinaEquity that had promised to invest between CNY 200 and 300 million, did not specify the source of the funding, failed to provide certificates and documents, and lacked measures to protect creditors, the court stated.

== Destinations ==
East Star Airlines destinations included (as of March 2009):

City	Country	Airport	Ref	Notes
Changde	China	Changde Airport		
Changsha	China	Changsha Huanghua International Airport		
Chongqing	China	Chongqing Jiangbei International Airport		
Dalian	China	Dalian Zhoushuizi International Airport		
Guangzhou	China	Guangzhou Baiyun International Airport		
Guilin	China	Guilin Liangjiang International Airport		
Haikou	China	Haikou Meilan International Airport		
Hangzhou	China	Hangzhou Xiaoshan International Airport		
Hong Kong	China	Hong Kong International Airport		
Macau	China	Macau International Airport		
Nanjing	China	Nanjing Lukou International Airport		
Qingdao	China	Qingdao Liuting International Airport		
Sanya	China	Sanya Phoenix International Airport		
Shanghai	China	Shanghai Hongqiao International Airport		
Shenyang	China	Shenyang Taoxian International Airport		
Shenzhen	China	Shenzhen Bao'an International Airport		
Tianjin	China	Tianjin Binhai International Airport		
Wuhan	China	Wuhan Tianhe International Airport		Base
Xi'an	China	Xi'an Xianyang International Airport		
Xiamen	China	Xiamen Gaoqi International Airport		
Zhengzhou	China	Zhengzhou Xinzheng International Airport		

== Fleet ==
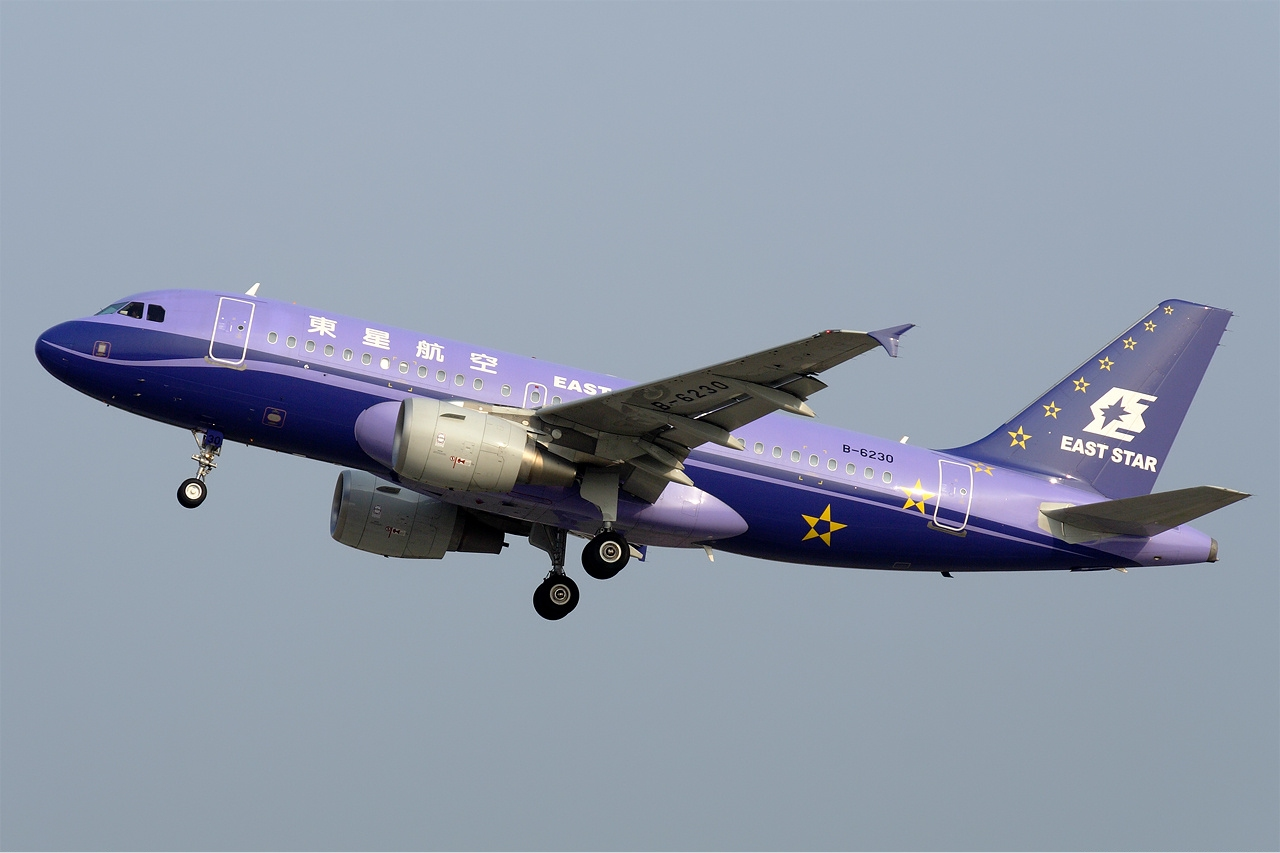
East Star Airlines Airbus A319

The East Star Airlines fleet included the following aircraft (as of 2 March 2009):

East Star Airlines Fleet
Aircraft	In Fleet	Notes
Airbus A319-100	3	
Airbus A320-200	6	
Total	9	
