= Kyrgyz Trans Avia =

| IATA | ICAO | Call sign |
|---|---|---|
| 6K | KTC | - |
- Founded: 2009
- Ceased operations: unknown
- Hubs: Manas International Airport
- Fleet size: 2
- Headquarters: Bishkek, Kyrgyzstan

Kyrgyz Trans Avia was a charter airline based in Bishkek, Kyrgyzstan. It was on the List of air carriers banned in the European Union.

== Fleet ==
The Kyrgyz Trans Avia fleet consisted of the following aircraft (as of April 2012):

- 1 Airbus A300B4 (operated for Mahan Air)
- 1 Airbus A310-300 (operated for Mahan Air)
