= Island Express Air =

Canadian airline

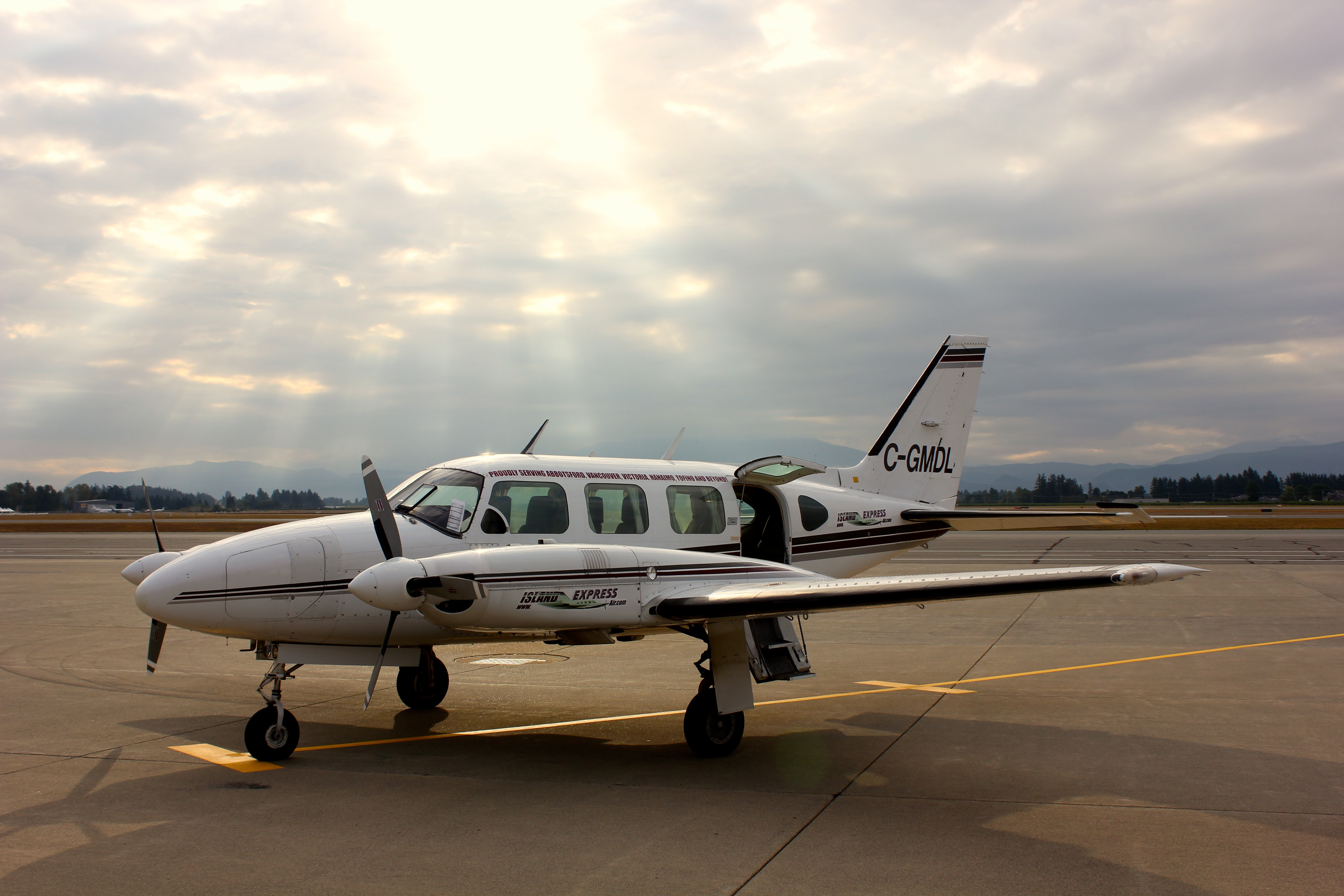
- A Piper PA-31 Navajo of Island Express Air
IATA	ICAO	Call sign
-	IAX	ABBOTSFORD AIR
- Founded: 2009
- Ceased operations: 2020
- AOC #: 19080
- Hubs: Abbotsford International Airport
- Focus cities: Victoria, Nanaimo
- Fleet size: 11
- Destinations: 6
- Parent company: Shorebird Enterprises
- Headquarters: Abbotsford, British Columbia
- Key people: Jim Young
- Website: www.islandexpressair.com

Island Express Air was a small Canadian airline based in Abbotsford, British Columbia. Its first flight was on August 7, 2009, as part of the Abbotsford International Airshow. It operated scheduled air service between the Lower Mainland and Vancouver Island, as well as charter flights and cargo service. On February 23, 2018, one of their planes, a King Air B100, crashed at Abbotsford Airport (CYXX) immediately after take-off in blizzard conditions. As a result of this accident, and due to public safety concerns, Transport Canada suspended Island Express' air operator's certificate (AOC) shortly thereafter, on February 28, 2018. However, following a robust review of the company's safety procedures the operating certificate was reinstated on June 26, 2018. The company slogan was Your Island Connection.

In 2020, amid the COVID-19 pandemic, Island Express Air ceased operations and sold its assets to a group of investors.

== Destinations ==
All destinations as of August 2019 were within British Columbia:

- Abbotsford (Abbotsford International Airport)
- Nanaimo (Nanaimo Airport)
- Qualicum Beach (Qualicum Beach Airport)
- Seasonal: Tofino (Tofino-Long Beach Airport)
- Vancouver (Vancouver International Airport)
- Victoria (Victoria International Airport)

== Fleet ==
Fleet as of August 2019:

Island Express Air fleet
Aircraft	No. of aircraft	Variants	Notes
Beechcraft King Air	1	100 series	
Piper PA-28 Cherokee	1	PA-28-151 Cherokee Warrior	
Piper PA-31 Navajo	6	PA-31-325 Navajo, PA-31-350 Chieftain	
Piper PA-32	1	PA-32-301 Saratoga	

== See also ==
- History of aviation in Canada
- List of defunct airlines of Canada
