= Megantara Air =

Indonesian cargo airline

IATA	ICAO	Call sign
9M	MKE	MEGANTARA
- Founded: 2007
- Ceased operations: May 2009
- Hubs: Soekarno-Hatta International Airport
- Fleet size: defunct
- Parent company: Transmile Group
- Headquarters: Tangerang, Indonesia
- Key people: Sofyan Danu Siswantoro (Chief Executive)
- Website: http://www.megantara.co.id/

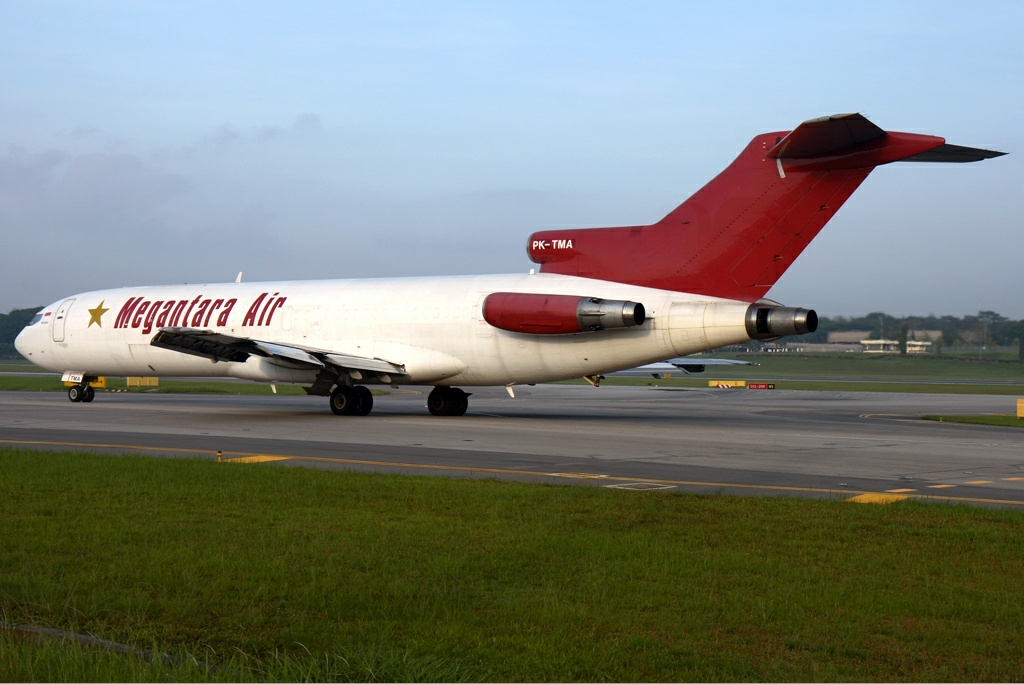
A Megantara Air Boeing 727 at Changi Airport, Singapore

Megantara Air was an Indonesian cargo airline based at Soekarno-Hatta International Airport. Operations started in May 2007; the airline operated freight charters and regular flights between Indonesia and Singapore.

In May 2009, the airline decided to suspend its operations. Its aircraft were later returned to Transmile Air Services of Malaysia. Megantara Air was listed in Category 2 by the Indonesian Civil Aviation Authority for airline safety quality.

== Fleet ==
The Megantara Air fleet (as of March 2009) was:

- 1 Boeing 727-200F
- 1 Boeing 737-200F

The aircraft were transferred from Transmile.
