= Wings of Bornholm =

Danish airline

IATA	ICAO	Call sign
—	ETS	EXTRANS
- Founded: 2009
- Ceased operations: 2010
- Operating bases: Bornholm Airport; Copenhagen Airport
- Frequent-flyer program: Bonus Coupons
- Fleet size: 1
- Destinations: 2
- Parent company: Wings of Europe AB
- Headquarters: Bornholm Airport, Denmark
- Key people: Henrik Dich, Executive Director
- Website: www.wingsofbornholm.dk

Wings of Bornholm was a Danish airline operating from the island of Bornholm, Denmark. The airline was owned by Swedish Wings of Europe Sverigeflyg and 9 companies from Bornholm. Tickets went on sale starting on 10 July 2009 for the airline's first flight between Bornholm Airport and Copenhagen Airporton 23 August 2009. On 12 April 2010 the airline announced that it would cease flights on 30 April 2010.

== Flights ==
The company did not own their own aircraft. Swedish company Avitran was responsible for operating the flights, and ran them under the same codes and callsigns as Avitrans Nordic flights.
