= 2009 Táchira helicopter crash =

Helicopter crash in Venezuela

- Táchira in Venezuela

Accident
- Date: 3 May 2009
- Summary: Undetermined
- Site: El Alto de Rubio, Táchira, Venezuela; 7°46′N 72°14′W

Aircraft
- Aircraft type: Mil Mi-17V-5
- Operator: Bolivarian Army of Venezuela
- Registration: EBV-08114
- Occupants: 17
- Passengers: 15
- Crew: 2
- Fatalities: 17
- Survivors: 0

The 2009 Táchira helicopter crash was the crash of a Venezuelan Army Mil Mi-17 helicopter on 3 May 2009 in which all 17 occupants were killed.

== Crash ==
The helicopter crashed at around midday local time (16.30 UTC) near El Alto de Rubio in the north-western state of Táchira in Venezuela. All seventeen people aboard the aircraft were killed. The dead included one Brigadier-General, two army pilots, thirteen other army personnel and one civilian. Venezuelan authorities initially reported eighteen fatalities but they later reduced the number to seventeen. Venezuelan President Hugo Chávez, who was a retired army Lieutenant-Colonel, announced the incident in his weekly television broadcast and said "I pay tribute to these soldiers of the homeland, especially Gen Faneite, who was my cadet".

The crash occurred just days after Colombian President Álvaro Uribe asked for Venezuelan assistance in eliminating FARC guerillas on the Venezuelan side of the border. It is unknown if the crash is linked to intensified Venezuelan military operations against the guerillas. The United States Department of State's annual assessment of terrorism had also recently criticised Venezuela for failing to police the border and stated that Colombian rebels and paramilitaries "regularly crossed into Venezuelan territory to rest and regroup as well as to extort protection money".
