= Volare Airlines (Ukraine) =

Ukrainian cargo charter airline

IATA	ICAO	Call sign
-	VRE	UKRAINE VOLARE
- Founded: 1994
- Ceased operations: 2009
- Hubs: Boryspil International Airport, Rivne International Airport
- Fleet size: 9
- Headquarters: Kyiv, Ukraine

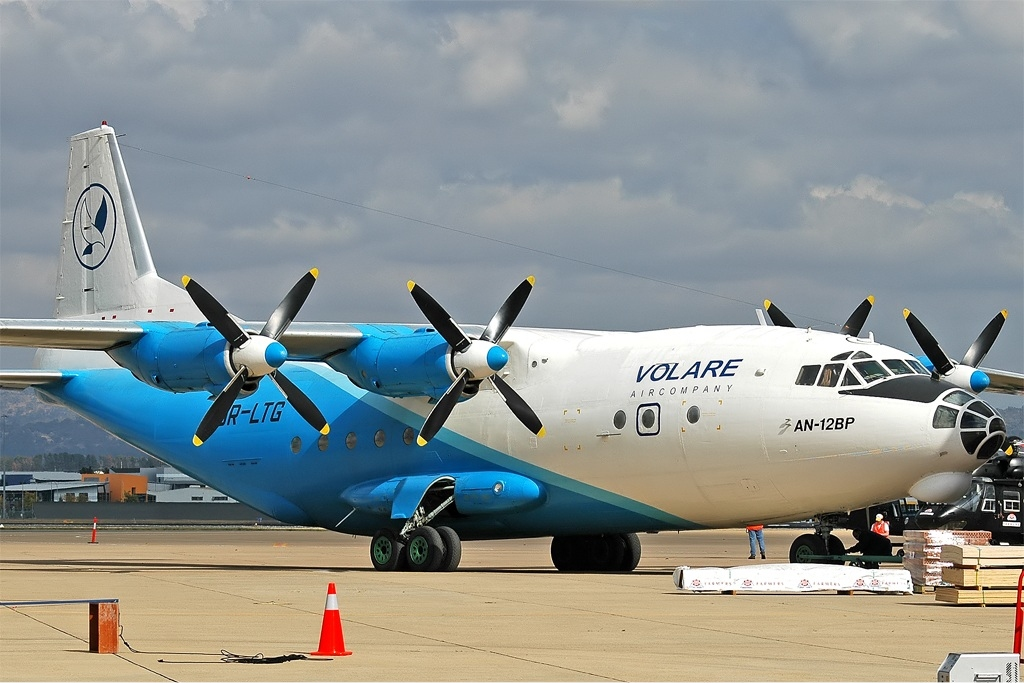
Volare Antonov An-12, Canberra, Australia, 2005

Volare Airlines was an airline based in Kyiv, Ukraine. It was established in 1994 and operated its first charter flight in November 1995. It operated charter and regular flights from its base airports at Rivne and Kyiv.

== History ==
The airline was shut down by the Ukrainian civil aviation authority over safety concerns in 2009. The carrier was also blacklisted by the European Union.

== Services ==
Volare Airlines operated air cargo flights within Ukraine and CIS, Europe, Middle East, Far East and Africa.

== Fleet ==
The Volare Airlines fleet included the following aircraft (as of August 2006):

- 6 Antonov An-12
- 2 Ilyushin Il-76MD
- 1 Ilyushin Il-76TD
