= Madina Air =

Airline of Libya

IATA	ICAO	Call sign
—	MDH	Madina
- Founded: 2009
- Hubs: Tripoli International Airport
- Fleet size: 2
- Parent company: Madina Holdings
- Headquarters: Tripoli Mitiga Airport, Libya
- Key people: Mustafa Al-Tork, CEO
- Website: http://airmadina.com/

Madina Air was a privately owned airline based in Tripoli, Libya. It was established in 2009 in order to operate charter flights in support of oil field operations, as well as to provide some scheduled and ad hoc charter services.

== Destinations ==
Madina Air is starting a service from XCR (Vatry) to MJI (Tripoli) twice weekly.

== Fleet ==
The Madina Air fleet includes the following aircraft:

- 1 Airbus A300-B4 (operated by [(Madina Air)]
- 2 Airbus A300-600 (operated by [Madina Air)]

=== On order ===
- 2 Fokker 100
