= Veteran Avia =

Armenian cargo airline

Veteran Avia LLC «Վետերան Ավիա»

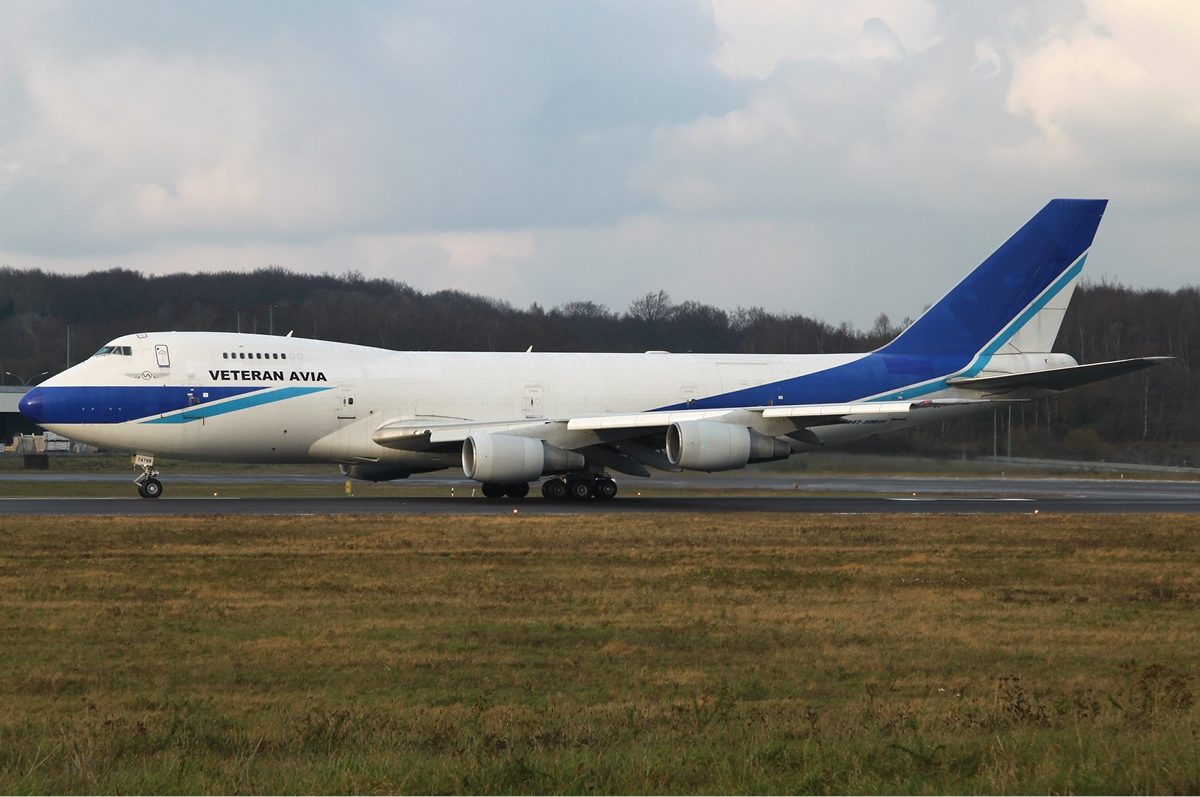
- Boeing 747-200F
IATA	ICAO	Call sign
—	VTF	VETFLIGHT
- Founded: 2009
- Ceased operations: 2014
- Hubs: Sharjah
- Focus cities: Dubai, Kabul, Yerevan
- Fleet size: 1
- Destinations: charter destinations
- Headquarters: Yerevan, Armenia
- Key people: Artashes Gevorgyan
- Website: www.veteran.aero

Veteran Avia (Armenian: Վետերան Ավիա) was a cargo airline based in Sharjah, U.A.E. The airline was established in 2009 and started operations on 16 June 2009. It operated freight services to destinations throughout the CIS, Europe and the Middle East. Its main bases were Zvartnots International Airport, Yerevan, and Sharjah airport, U.A.E.. The airline halted operations in 2014.

== Operations ==
Veteran Avia operated charter flights into Europe, throughout the CIS, Middle East and Afghanistan.

== Fleet ==
- 1 Boeing 747-200F
- 2 Ilyushin 76
