= Efly =

Airline of Malta

IATA	ICAO	Call sign
LE	LEF	—
- Founded: 2009
- Ceased operations: 2009
- Operating bases: Malta International Airport
- Fleet size: 1
- Destinations: 2
- Headquarters: Luqa, Malta
- Key people: Frans Camilleri (Manager)
- Website: http://www.efly.it/

Efly was an airline based in Malta. It operated commercial, charter and ad-hoc flights. It briefly operated a route between Malta and Catania, Sicily, with hopes to provide a luxury service at low cost.

== History ==
Efly was a low-cost carrier established by Luigi Crisipino and fellow business partners, to provide luxurious, low cost flights with service to several destinations throughout Europe, beginning with London's Gatwick Airport.

The airline leased four aircraft, but only one aircraft was delivered to the airline, in Malta. The airline failed to obtain its license to operate as a commercial airline, but it could fly its sole aircraft. In September 2009, weeks after Luigi Crisipino's resignation, the airline began operations operating an inaugural flight of 56 passengers.

On November 5, 2009, the airline ceased operation due to tough competition on its Malta-Catania route, and struggles with entry permits and vehicle ramp access at Malta International Airport.

== Destinations ==
Destinations that Efly flew to in 2009:

=== Europe ===
- Malta
  - Malta (Malta International Airport)
- Italy
  - Catania (Catania Fontanarossa Airport)

Flights ceased on November 5, 2009. Customers were reimbursed for cancelled flights.

== Fleet ==
The Efly fleet consisted of:

- 1 BAe 146-300, registered 9H-ELE

This aircraft was returned to its lessor and placed in storage.
