= Feel Air =

Norwegian airline, never flew

- Founded: 2009
- Hubs: Oslo Airport, Gardermoen; Stockholm Arlanda Airport
- Fleet size: 2 (unconfirmed)
- Destinations: 4
- Headquarters: Bærum, Norway
- Website: www.feelair.com

Feel Air was a Norwegian low-cost airline that had announced plans to operate intercontinental flights from Oslo Airport, Gardermoen in Norway and Stockholm Arlanda Airport in Sweden. The plans were launched on 2 October 2009 and the announced starting date was spring 2011 with Airbus A330-200 aircraft. Services would be from both Oslo and Stockholm to John F. Kennedy International Airport in New York City, United States and Suvarnabhumi Airport in Bangkok, Thailand.

The airline never came on its own feet, and late in 2011 it dropped the whole plan. The airline had a plan to have 160 employees at start-up and a share capital of 240 million Norwegian krone, sold by DNB Markets.

The company is led by Kai Holmberg and Otto Lagarhus and based at Ramstad in Bærum, Norway. Management has stated that the airline will have a cost structure similar to Ryanair, while taking the operation and business model from AirAsia X and the employment and branding philosophy from Virgin Atlantic.

Feel Air will target leisure travelers and plans to weight frequencies toward New York in the summer and Thailand in the winter. It predicted EBITA of NOK 48 million next year based on yield of $0.05, load factor rising from 49% to 76% and fleet utilization of 16.7 hours per day.

== Fleet ==
Aircraft	In service	Orders	Passengers (Economy)	Routes	Note
Airbus A330-200	0	2 (unconfirmed)	307 seats	New York, Bangkok	

== Planned destinations ==
City	Airport codes		Airport name	Aircraft used	Notes
City	IATA	ICAO	Airport name	Aircraft used	Notes
Norway
Oslo	OSL	ENGM	Oslo Airport, Gardermoen	Airbus A330-200	Hub
Sweden
Stockholm	ARN	ESSA	Stockholm Arlanda Airport	Airbus A330-200	Hub
Thailand
Bangkok	BKK	VTBS	Suvarnabhumi Airport	Airbus A330-200	Starts 2011
United States of America
New York City	JFK	KJFK	John F. Kennedy International Airport	Airbus A330-200	Starts 2011
