= Eurex Airlines =

IATA	ICAO	Call sign
—	URX	—
- Founded: 2009
- Ceased operations: 2011
- Operating bases: Tbilisi International Airport
- Fleet size: 1
- Headquarters: Istanbul, Turkey
- Website: www.eurexairlines.com (defunct)

Eurex Airlines, also known as Eurex Cargo, was a cargo airline from Georgia with its headquarters in Istanbul, Turkey, that offered ad hoc flights out of Tbilisi International Airport. It was founded in 2009 and (in January 2011) operated only one freighter aircraft, a 26 years old Boeing 747-200F. In February 2011, the aircraft left the fleet and the company was shut down.
