= Jota Aviation =

British specialist charter airline

IATA	ICAO	Call sign
-	ENZ	ENZO
- Founded: 2009
- Ceased operations: April 2022
- Fleet size: 7
- Parent company: Jota Group
- Headquarters: Southend-on-Sea, England

Jota Aviation Limited was a British specialist charter airline based at London Southend Airport, United Kingdom. It held a United Kingdom Civil Aviation Authority Type A Operating Licence No. 2376; and was permitted to carry passengers, cargo and mail on aircraft with 20 or more seats.

== History ==
Jota Aviation was founded in 2009, to meet the travel and cargo demands of the motorsport industry. Together with the related Jota Sport, Jota Design and Jota Historic divisions, formed the Jota Group. It was expanded into a specialist air charter and aircraft management company, offering 24-hour-a-day response from its Southend Airport base. The company once declared itself the largest operator of King Air Model 90 aircraft in Europe.

The company offered ad hoc or Aircraft, Crew, Maintenance and Insurance (wet lease) charter flights on its British Aerospace 146, added to its Air Operator's Certificate in 2014. On 11 January 2016, JOTA announced the addition to their fleet of an Avro RJ85 aircraft. It was delivered to Southend on 5 April 2016. On 20 February 2017, JOTA received an Avro RJ100 formerly operated by Brussels Airlines. On 10 April 2018, JOTA announced an expansion of their cargo fleet with the addition of four BAe 146-300QTs, the first of which, was expected to enter service on 1 June 2018. Operations commenced on 17 October 2018.

Jota Aviation ceased operations in April 2022 and announced in the following month that it was entering liquidation due to negative effects of the COVID-19 pandemic on its business.
