= Imair Airlines =

Airline from Azerbaijan

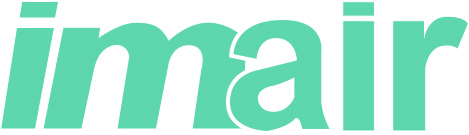

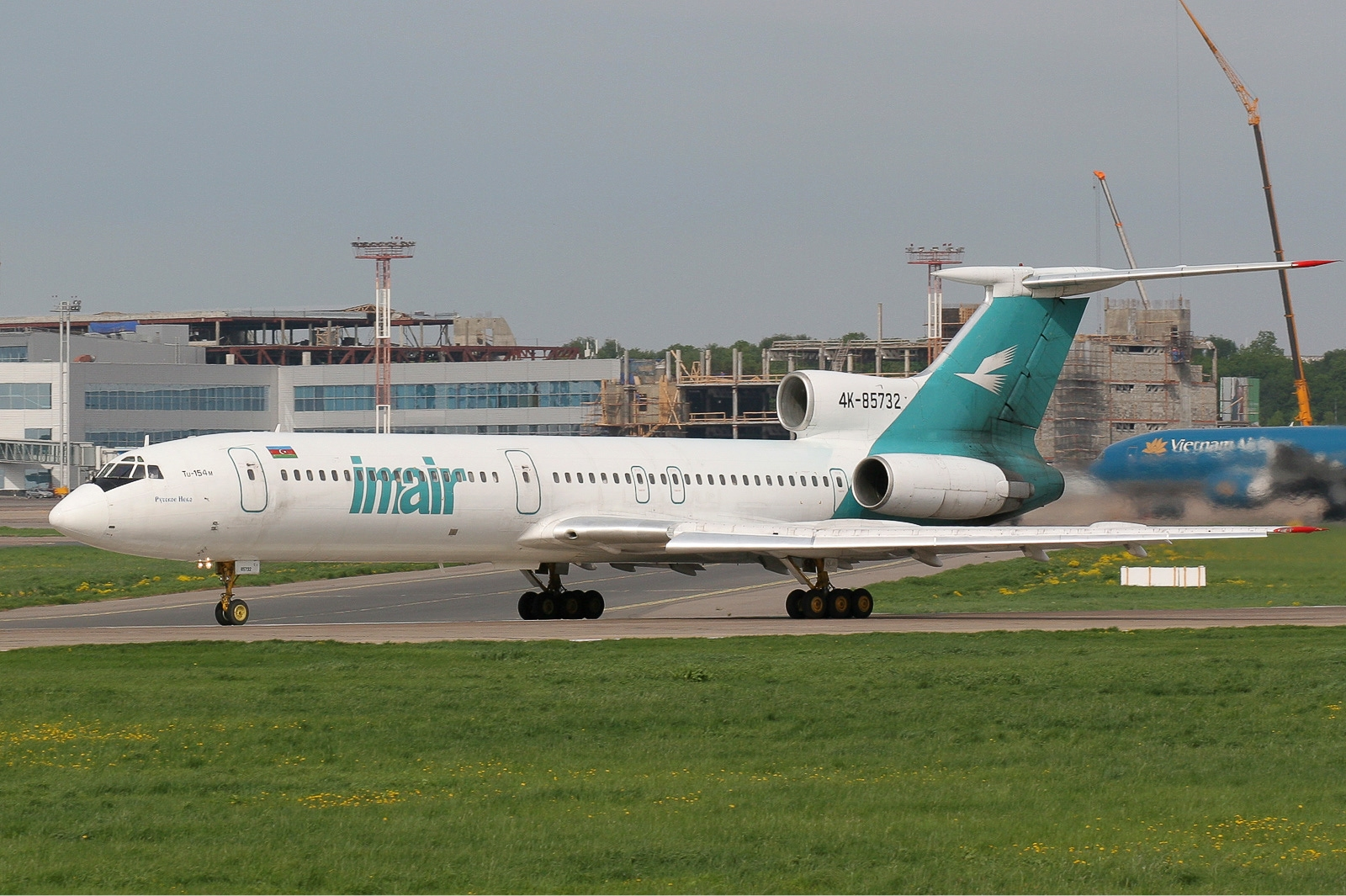
- Tupolev Tu-154M
IATA	ICAO	Call sign
IK	ITX	IMPROTEX
- Founded: 6 October 1994
- Ceased operations: 23 November 2009
- Operating bases: Heydar Aliyev International Airport
- Fleet size: 2
- Destinations: 6
- Headquarters: Baku, Azerbaijan
- Key people: Fizouli Alakbarov (CEO)
- Website: www.imair.com

Imair Airlines was an airline based in Baku, Azerbaijan. It was a private airline operating international scheduled and charter passenger services from 1995 until its ceased operations on 23 November 2009. Its main base was Heydar Aliyev International Airport, Baku.

== History ==
The airline was established on 6 October 1994 and started operations in July 1995. On 23 November 2009 the airline ceased operations and announced plans to sell its two remaining Tupolev-154 aircraft.

== Destinations ==
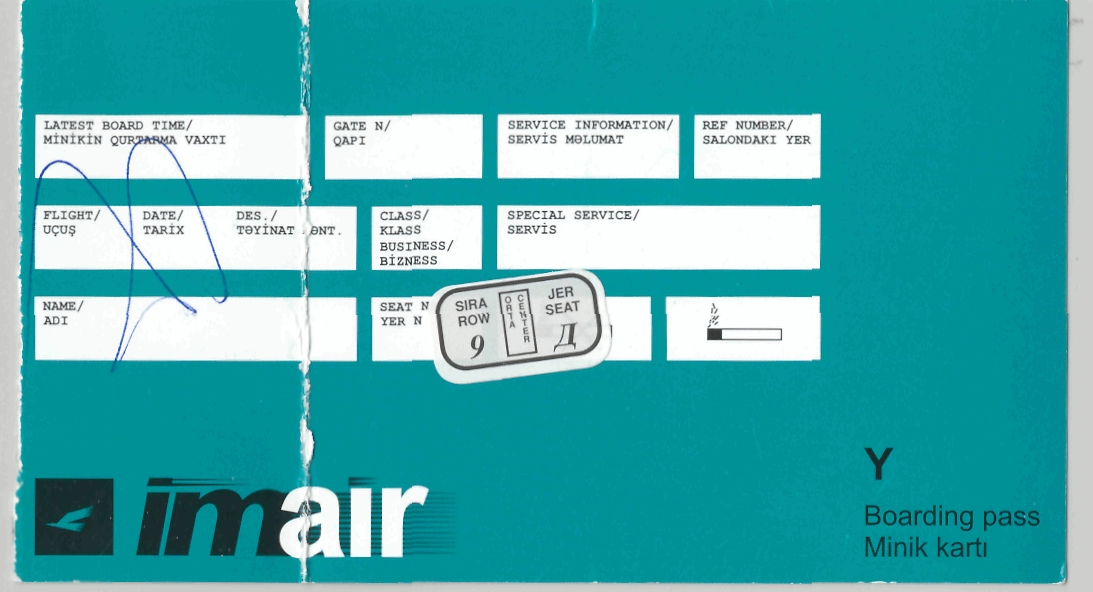
A boarding pass of a flight from Baku to Almaty in year 2005

Imair Airlines served the following destinations (at November 2009):

- Azerbaijan
  - Baku - Heydar Aliyev International Airport Base
- Kazakhstan
  - Almaty - Almaty International Airport
  - Nur-Sultan - Nursultan Nazarbayev International Airport
- Russia
  - Surgut: Surgut Airport
- Turkey
  - Bodrum: Milas–Bodrum Airport
- Uzbekistan
  - Tashkent: Tashkent International Airport

== Fleet ==
The Imair Airlines fleet included the following aircraft (at 23 November 2009)

- 2 Tupolev Tu-154M
