= Norsk Helikopterservice =

Norwegian helicopter airline

- Founded: 2009
- Commenced operations: 14 June 2012
- Operating bases: Stavanger Airport, Sola
- Fleet size: 8
- Parent company: Babcock International
- Headquarters: Sola, Norway
- Key people: Bjørn Veum Seljevold (founder)
- Website: norskhelikopterservice.no

Norsk Helikopterservice AS (NHS) is an offshore helicopter airline based at Stavanger Airport, Sola in Sola Municipality, Norway. It operates a fleet of Sikorsky S-92 flying services to offshore oil platforms for oil companies. The company was incorporated in 2009 and commenced operations in 2012. Babcock International owns a majority of the company.

== History ==
Norsk Helikopterservice was the brainchild of Bjørn Veum Seljevold. At the age of 54, he was working as a heavy helicopter inspector for the Norwegian Civil Aviation Authority. His background was helicopter pilot and having started a helicopter operating company in the United States. He saw that the offshore market was split between Helikopter Service and Norsk Helikopter (later Bristow Norway). He therefore started working on plans to found his own offshore helicopter company. His aim was to capture about twenty to twenty-five percent of the market, which he estimated would total about fifty aircraft.

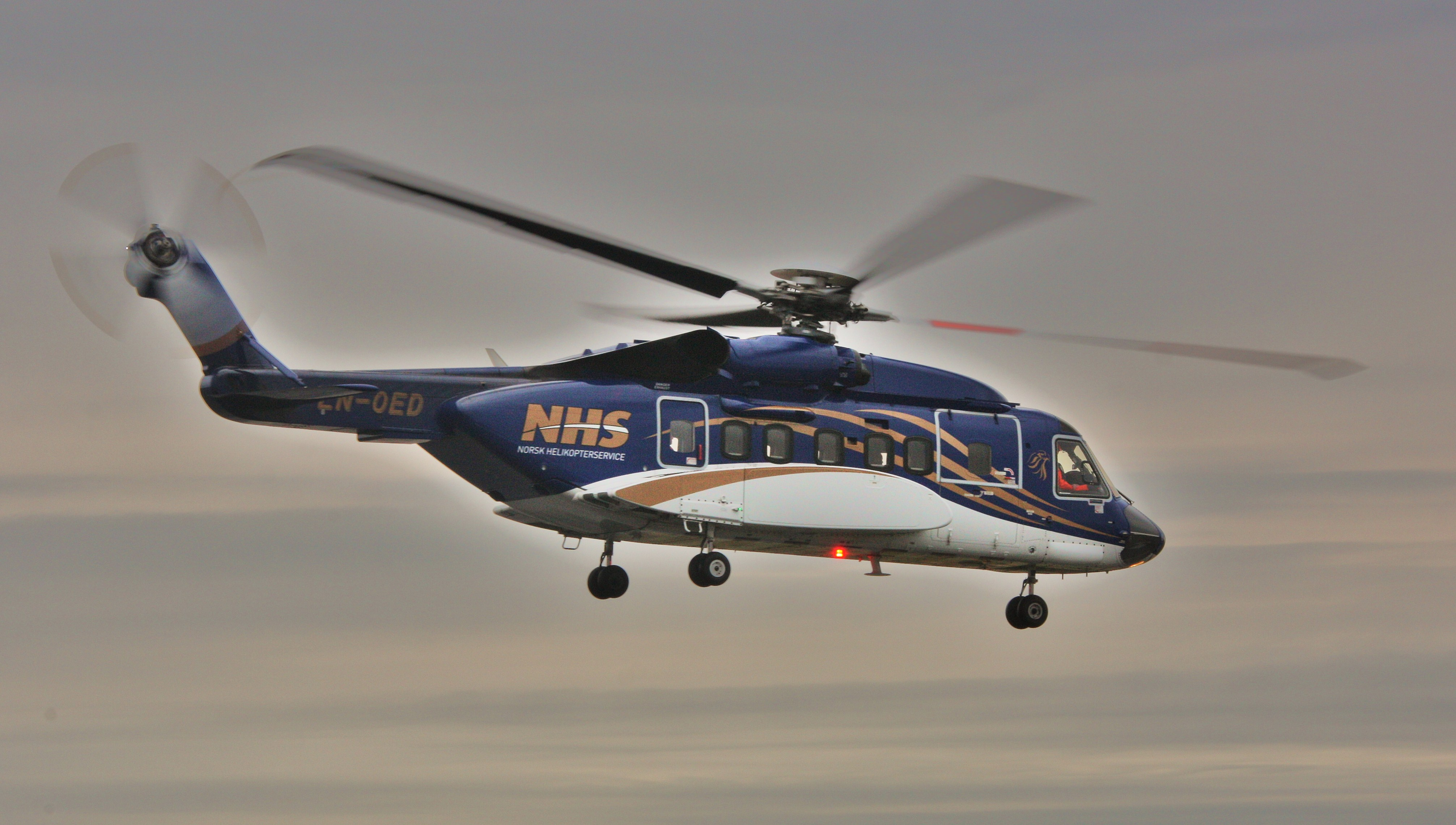
NHS Sikorsky S-92A

The company was incorporated in 2009. It "borrowed" its name from that of its two main competitors, after the company discovered that they had not properly protected their trademarks. The company decided to establish its head office and main base at Stavanger Airport, Sola, due to it being a national center for helicopter traffic and ease of access to other oil cities. Norsk Helikopterservice bought the hangar formerly built to house Braathens Helikopter.

It took several years to get the company in shape to commence operations. The first major hurdle was financing. This resulted with an agreement with Bond Offshore Helicopters based in Aberdeen, Scotland, and World Helicopters Norway, where the latter received sixty-fiver percent of the shares. This company was part of the Avincis group. The remaining thirty percent were held by Norwegian investors, including many of the key employees.

Operations commenced on 14 June 2012, with an AgustaWestland AW139 leased from Bond and operated with ad hoc flights on the British sector. A joint order between Bond and NHS was made for sixteen Sikorsky S-92A helicopters, eight to each company. The first two were delivered to NHS in February 2013, and the original order was scheduled to run until 2017. The aircraft were contracted to Bond, who at the time had their fleet of Eurocopter EC225 Super Pumas grounded. The two S-92s were based at Aberdeen Airport and crewed by NHS employees.

== Bibliography ==
- Olsen-Hagen, Bernt Charles (2014). Offshore Helicopters: Helikopteraktiviteten på norsk kontinentalsokkel (in Norwegian). Aviation Forlag. ISBN 978-82-999547-0-9.
