= Skysouth =

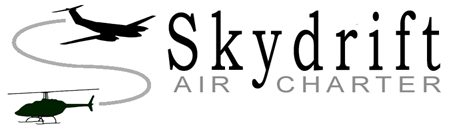
IATA	ICAO	Call sign
-	SDL	-
- Commenced operations: 2004
- Ceased operations: February 2009 scheduled operations - 2010 all operations
- Operating bases: Shoreham Airport
- Focus cities: Caen - Carpiquet Airport; Deauville - Saint-Gatien Airport; Le Touquet - Côte d'Opale AirportRouen Airport France
- Fleet size: 1
- Destinations: 5
- Parent company: Skydrift Ltd
- Headquarters: Shoreham-by-Sea, England
- Website: www.skysouth.co.uk

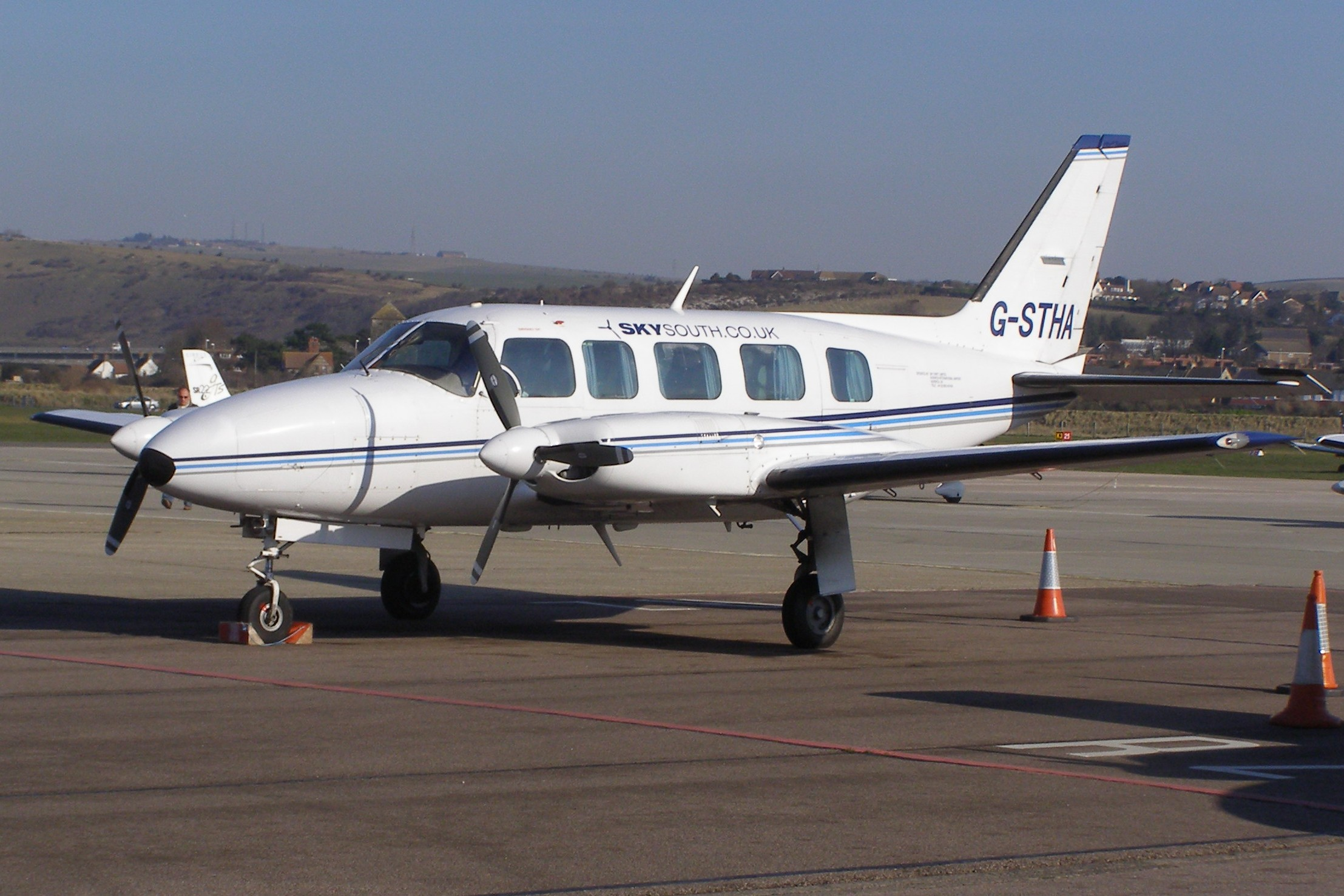
PA-31-350 Navajo Chieftain at Shoreham Airport.

Skydrift Air Charter was an air company, based in Norwich, which started on-demand flight in 2004. After a relatively positive activity, the company decided to activate scheduled connections from Shoreham Airport. These commenced on 24 July 2006 under Skysouth brand to France, Caen and Le Touquet destinations with at least 22 weekly flights. A twice-weekly service to Deauville was introduced on 15 January 2008. All scheduled operations were halted in February 2009, citing, in the website announcement, "unprecedented economic conditions" which made the operation no longer financially viable. The company ceased all operations during the following year.

== Destinations ==
Skysouth served three destinations in France from the United Kingdom (at 4 January 2009):

- France
  - Caen (Caen - Carpiquet Airport)
  - Deauville (Deauville - Saint-Gatien Airport)
  - Le Touquet (Le Touquet - Côte d'Opale Airport)
- United Kingdom
    - Shoreham-by-Sea (Shoreham Airport) Hub

== Fleet ==
Skysouth fleet consisted of one aircraft (at 4 January 2009):

Aircraft type	Total	Routes	Passengers
PA-31-350 Navajo Chieftain	1	Shoreham - France	9

== See also ==
- List of defunct airlines of the United Kingdom
