= Rayyan Air =

Pakistani airline

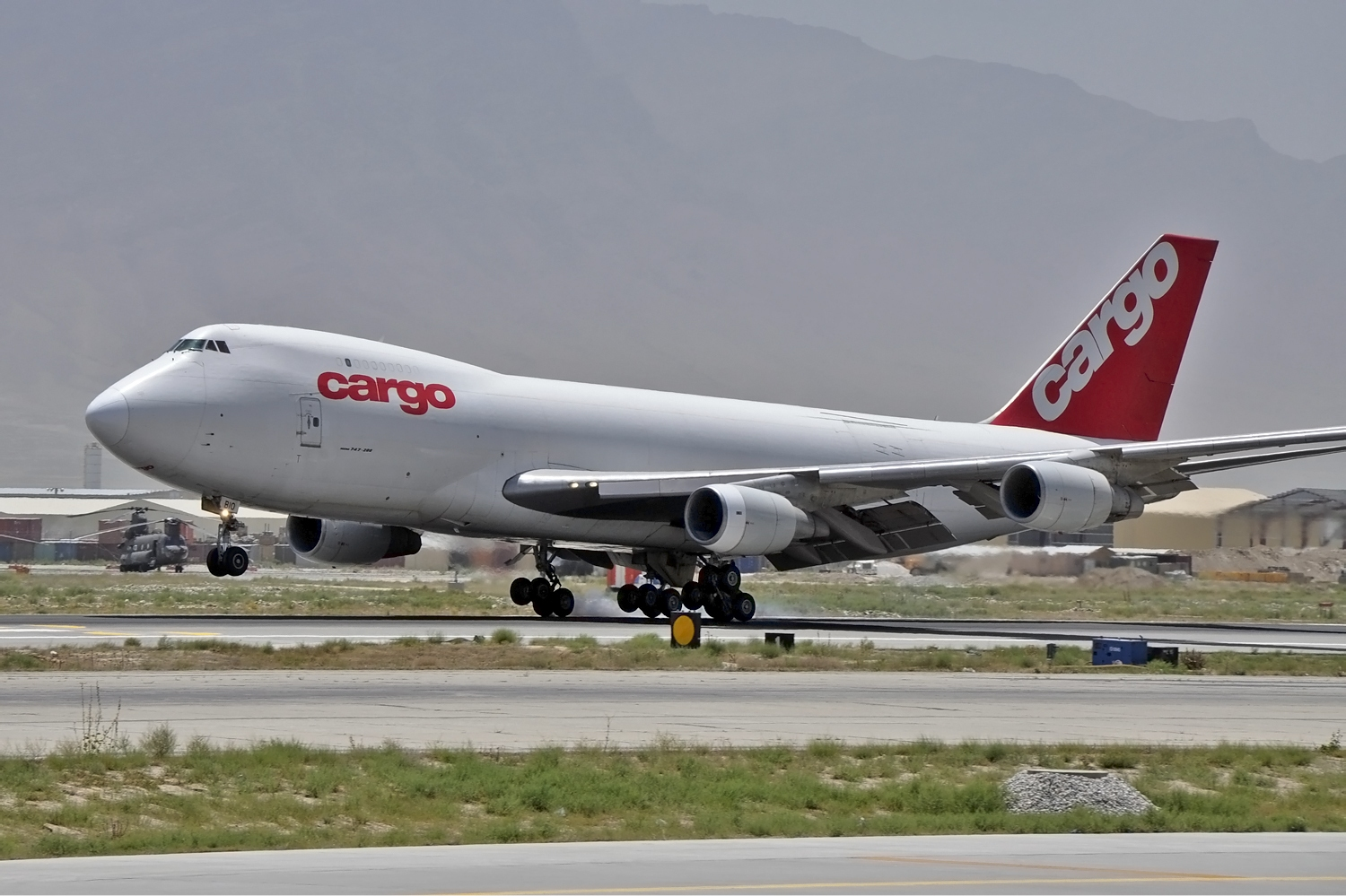
- Rayyan Air Boeing 747-200F
IATA	ICAO	Call sign
RA	RAB	RAYYAN AIR
- Founded: 2009
- Ceased operations: 2015
- Hubs: Jinnah International Airport, Allama Iqbal International Airport, Benazir Bhutto International Airport, Bacha Khan International Airport
- Destinations: Unknown
- Headquarters: Islamabad, Pakistan
- Key people: Rayyan Syed
- Website: www.rayyanair.com/index.php

Rayyan Air was a Pakistani private charter airline based in Pakistan and the UAE. Rayyan Air held Pakistan Civil Aviation Authority Air Operator Certificate alongside Charter Licence for passenger, cargo, and charter operations.

Founded in 2009, the company ended cargo operations in 2015.

== Services ==
- Passenger air services
- Cargo air services
- Ground handling
- Aircraft management

== Fleet ==
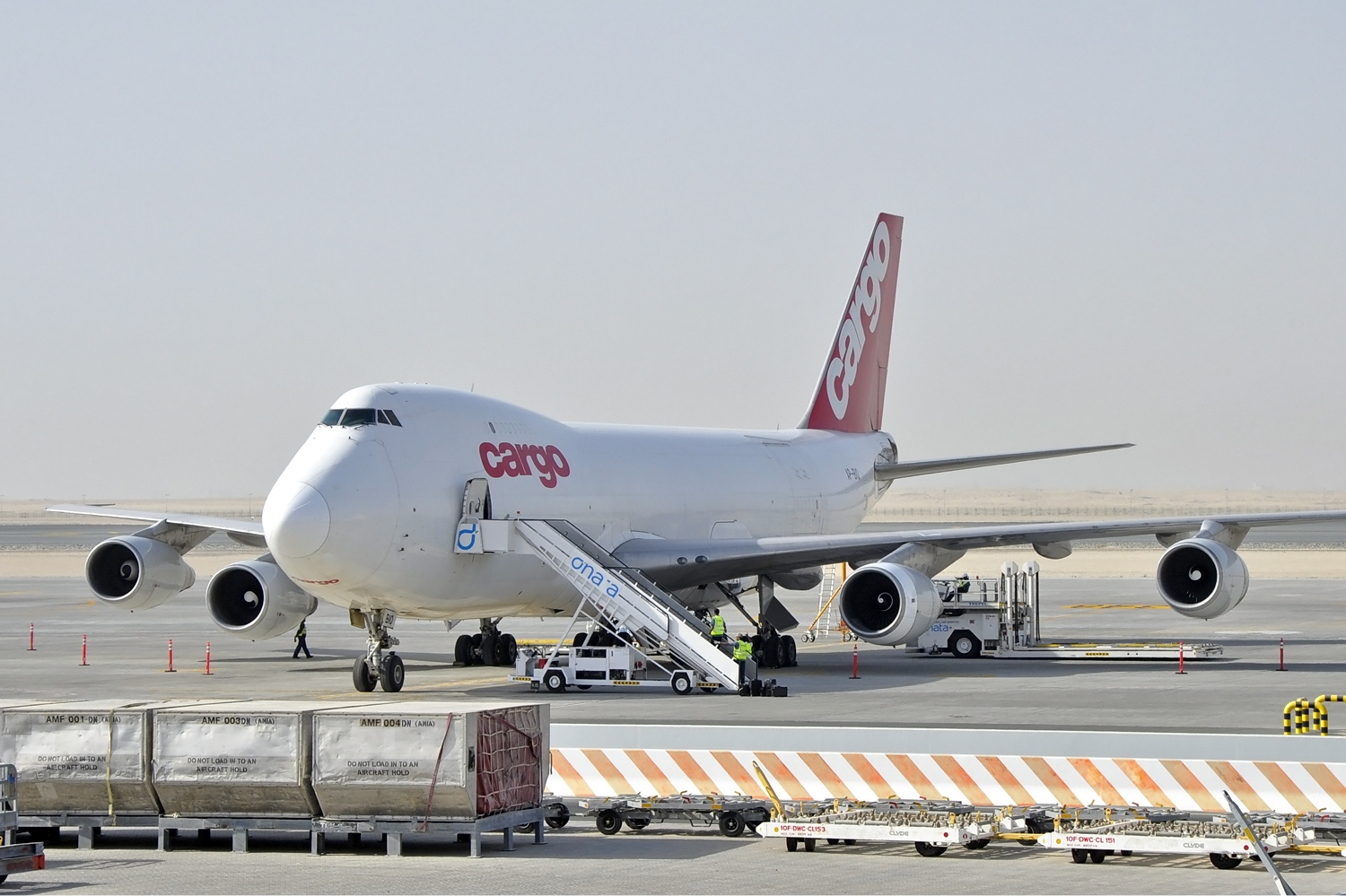
Rayyan Air B747-200F at Dubai airport

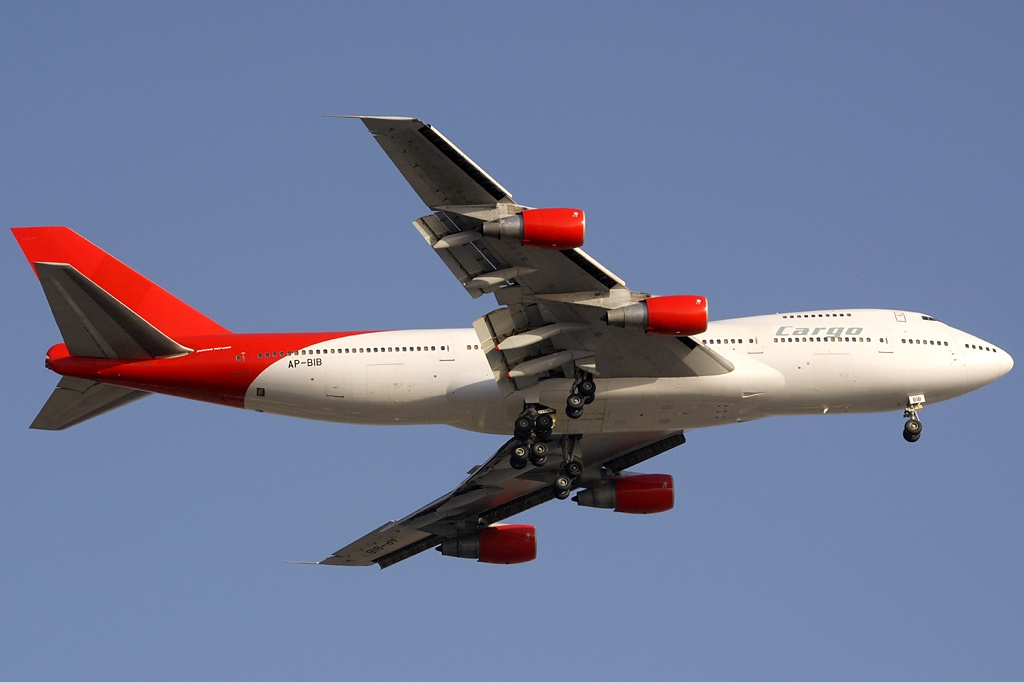
Converted Rayyan Air Boeing 747-200

Rayyan Air fleet :

Aircraft	In Fleet
Boeing 747-200F	4
