= Air Express Sweden =

Charter airline of Sweden

IATA	ICAO	Call sign
-	AEQ	LUNA
- Ceased operations: 2009
- Hubs: Stockholm-Arlanda Airport
- Headquarters: Stockholm, Sweden
- Website: http://www.airexpress.se/

Air Express Sweden was a charter airline based in Stockholm, Sweden. Originally being owned by Swedish investment group Salénia (which also owns Skyways Express and Amapola Flyg), it belongs to MCA Airlines since 2009. All formerly operated aircraft were merged into the MCA fleet, too.

== See also ==
- Airlines
- Transport in Sweden
