= MCA Airlines =

Swedish airline

IATA	ICAO	Call sign
–	MCA	CALSON
- Founded: 2008
- Ceased operations: 2009
- Hubs: Stockholm-Arlanda Airport
- Fleet size: 4
- Destinations: 12
- Headquarters: Stockholm, Sweden
- Key people: Michael Carlsson (Chief Executive)
- Website: http://www.mcaairlines.com/

MCA Airlines was a scheduled airline based in Stockholm, Sweden. It declared bankruptcy on November 11, 2009.

In 2009, MCA Airlines took over Air Express Sweden.

== Destinations ==
MCA Airlines operated the following services (as of September 2009):

- Cyprus
  - Larnaca (Larnaca International Airport)
- Greece
  - Athens (Athens International Airport) [seasonal]
  - Thessaloniki (Thessaloniki International Airport, "Macedonia") [seasonal]
- Iraq
  - Basra (Basra International Airport)
  - Erbil (Erbil International Airport)
  - Sulaymaniyah (Sulaimaniyah International Airport)
- Lebanon
  - Beirut (Beirut Rafic Hariri International Airport)
- Netherlands
  - Amsterdam (Amsterdam Airport Schiphol)
- Norway
  - Oslo (Oslo Airport, Gardermoen)
- Serbia
  - Niš (Niš Constantine the Great Airport) [planned to start December 14, 2009]
- Sweden
  - Gothenburg (Göteborg Landvetter Airport)
  - Malmö (Malmö Airport)
  - Stockholm (Stockholm-Arlanda Airport)

== Fleet ==
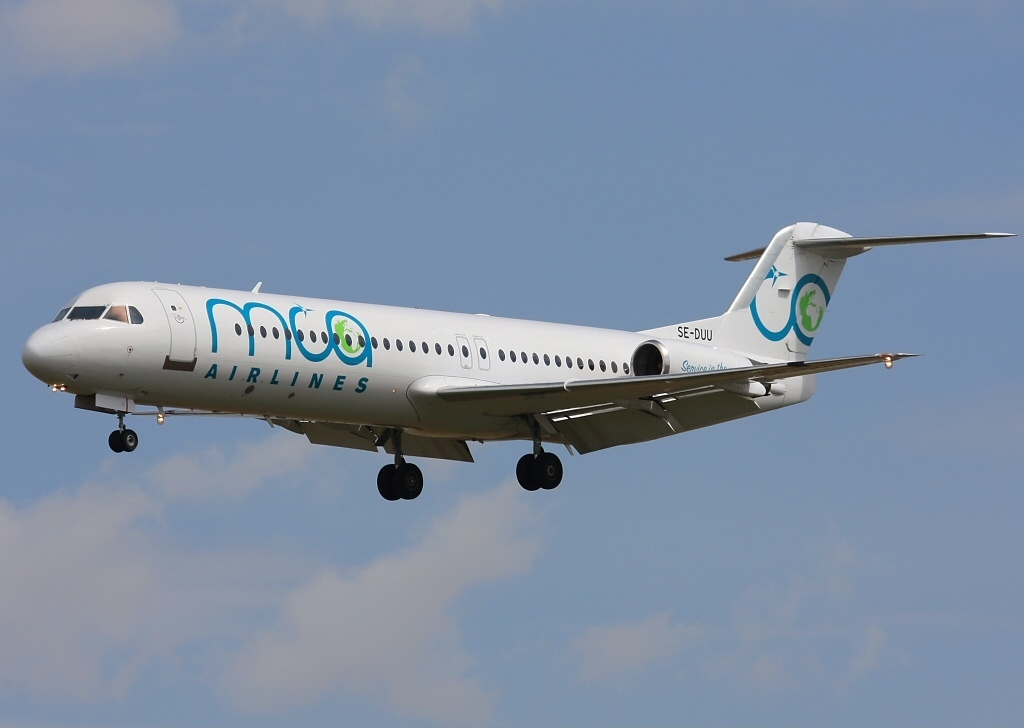
An MCA Airlines Fokker 100

The MCA Airlines fleet included the following aircraft (as of June 2009):

- 1 Fokker 100
- 1 Airbus A320-200 (which is operated by SmartLynx Airlines)
- 2 Saab 2000

== See also ==
- Airlines
- Transport in Sweden
