= Aerotur-KZ Airlines =

Airline of Kazakhstan

Aerotur Air
IATA	ICAO	Call sign
-	RAI	DIASA
- Founded: 2006
- Ceased operations: 2009
- Operating bases: Taraz Airport
- Fleet size: 2
- Headquarters: Taraz, Kazakhstan

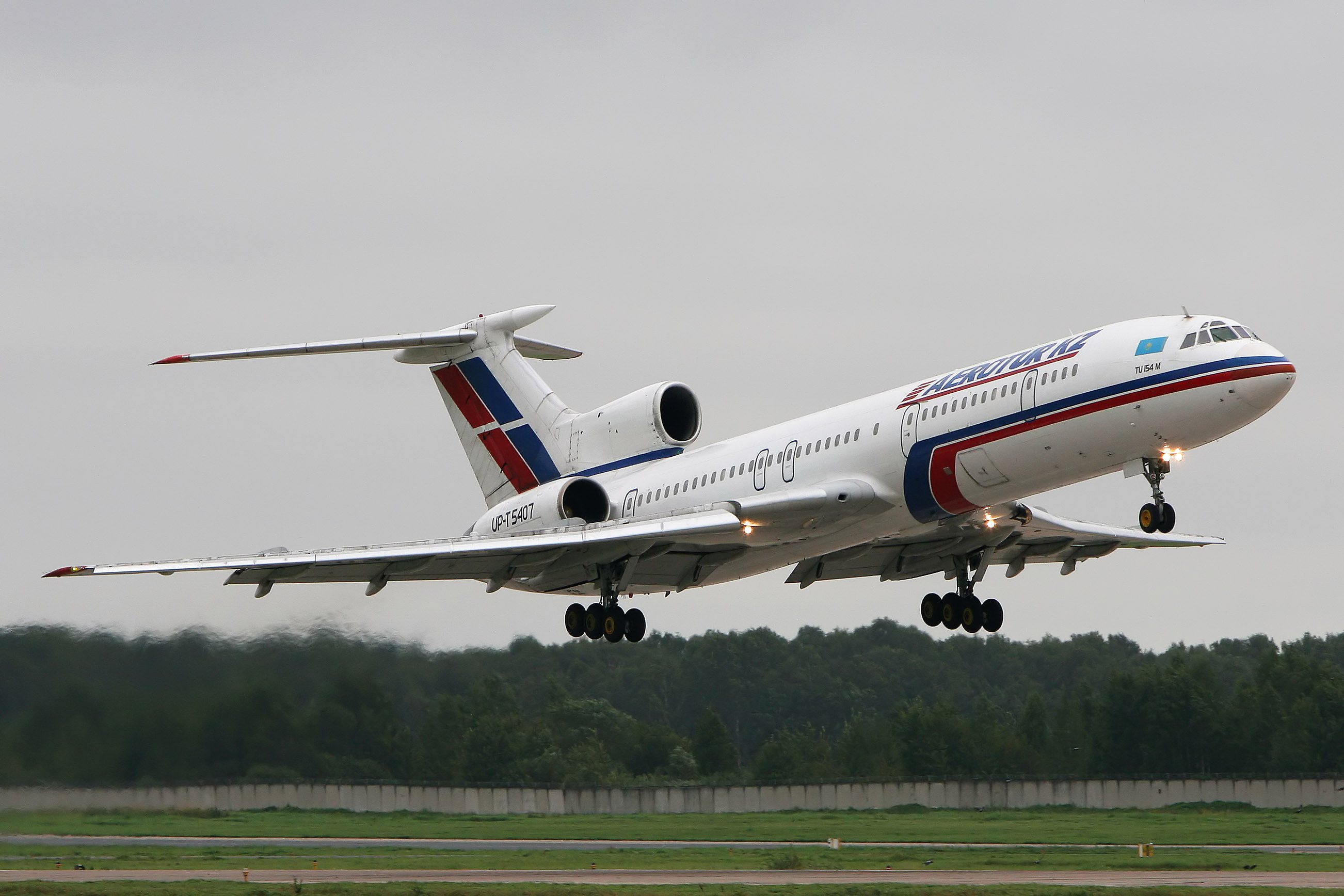
Aerotur KZ Tupolev Tu-154M, Moscow, 2008

Aerotur-KZ Airlines was an airline based in Taraz, Kazakhstan, which operated charter flights out of Taraz Airport, using a fleet of two Tupolev Tu-154 aircraft.

== History ==
Aerotur-KZ was founded in 2006. On 1 April 2009, its airline license was revoked, shortly before the airline was added to the List of air carriers banned in the European Union due to the poor maintenance standards in Kazakhstan.

== Fleet ==
Aerotur-KZ operated 2 Tupolev Tu-154s between 2006 and 2009.
