= Aviatrans Kiev =

Ukrainian airline

| IATA | ICAO | Call sign |
|---|---|---|
| KI | KCA | TRANS KIEV |
- Founded: 2009
- Hubs: Kyiv Zhuliany International Airport
- Fleet size: 3
- Destinations: Charters
- Headquarters: Kyiv, Ukraine

Aviatrans Kiev was an airline based in Kyiv, Ukraine. The airline operates charter services for tour operators between Ukraine and destinations in Europe. Aviatrans Kyiv is the successor of the former Trans Kyiv which loses the flying license.

== Fleet ==
The Aviatrans Kiev fleet included the following aircraft:

- 2 McDonnell Douglas MD-83 operated by Khors Air
- 1 Airbus A320-200 the aircraft operated jointly with Wind Rose Aviation
