= Seagle Air =

Slovakian charter airline

IATA	ICAO	Call sign
SJ	CGL	SEAGLE
- Founded: 1995
- Ceased operations: 2009
- Operating bases: M. R. Štefánik Airport; Ruzyně Airport; Trenčín Airfield
- Fleet size: 5 (at closure)
- Headquarters: Trenčín, Slovakia
- Key people: Peter Hanák (CEO)
- Website: www.seagleair.sk

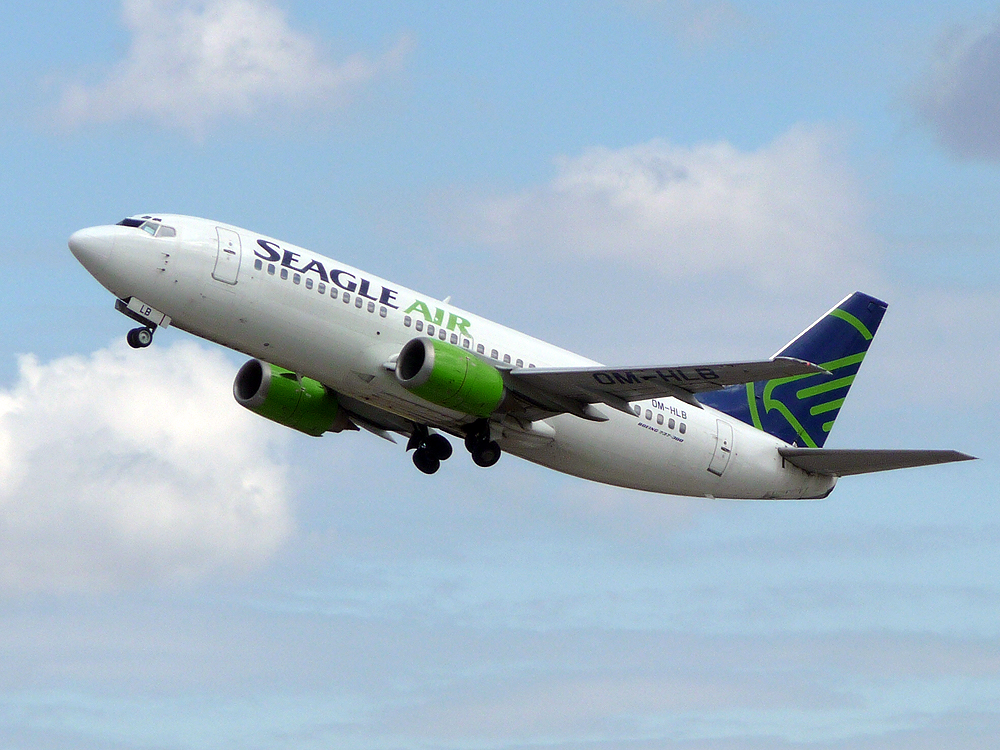
A Seagle Air Boeing 737-300 shortly after take-off (2008).

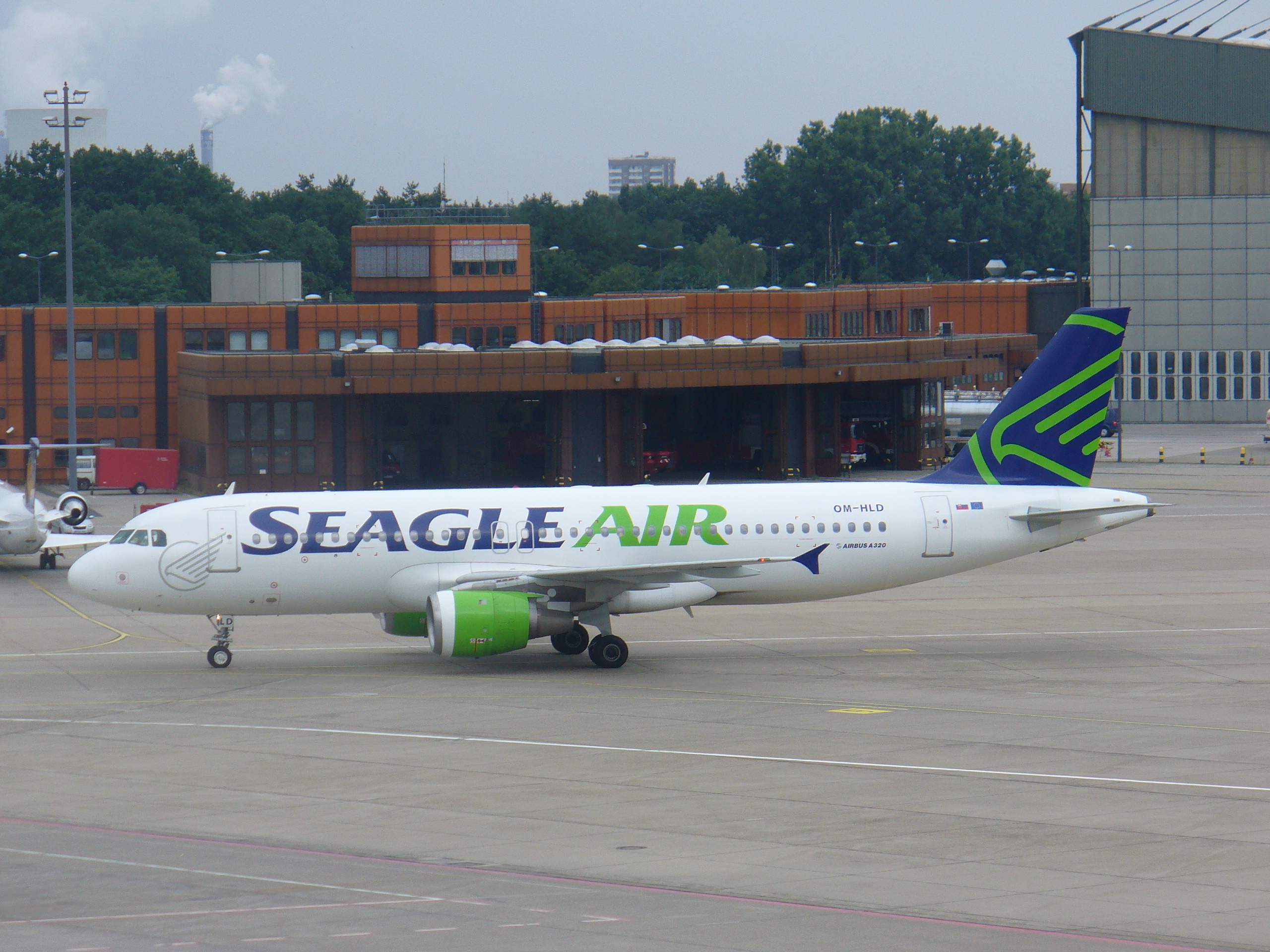
A Seagle Air Airbus A320 at Berlin Tegel Airport in 2009, operating a flight for Olympic Airlines.

Seagle Air was a charter airline based in Trenčín, Slovakia. It had its operations out of M. R. Štefánik Airport in Bratislava, with a second base in Prague. The airline operated non-scheduled air services, including passenger, cargo and mail charter flights to domestic and international destinations.

Established in 1995 as private flying school Seagle Air later added cargo and mail flights, in 2006 VIP transport and in 2007 charter flights. In 2007 it also took over a large portion of employees and offices from the bankrupted Slovak Airlines.

The company also operated a flight training organization, where future pilots could receive their Airline Transport Pilot License flying on Katana Diamond DA20, DA40 and DA42 Twin Star aircraft. The flight school was located in a bed and breakfast style accommodation facility at Trenčín Airfield. Seagle Air-FTO continues to operate normally.

== Financial performance ==
On 31 December 2008, Seagle Air had an overdue debt of 230,000 Euros on social insurance of its employees. This overdue debt increased to 333,000 Euros at the end of March 2009. At the end of June 2009, Seagle Air has no more debts towards social insurance. Nevertheless, on 23 October 2009, Seagle Air ceased all its services due to finance problems. All passenger aircraft were returned to their lessors. On January 25, 2010, the media announced bankruptcy of the company.

== Fleet ==
The Seagle Air fleet consisted of the following aircraft when it was shut down:

Seagle Air fleet
Aircraft	Total	Notes
Airbus A320-200	2	
Boeing 737-300	4	
Total	6	
