= Pet Airways =

Airline of the United States

IATA	ICAO	Call sign
—	SUB	SUB AIR
- Founded: 2009; 17 years ago
- Ceased operations: 2011; 15 years ago
- Fleet size: 20
- Destinations: 14 (as of April 2011)
- Headquarters: Delray Beach, Florida
- Key people: Dan Wiesel (CEO); Alysa Binder (CDO)
- Website: www.petairways.com

Pet Airways was an American company headquartered in Delray Beach, Florida, that specialized exclusively in air transportation of pets. The airline claimed to be the first designed specifically for pets where pets flew in the main cabin, not in cargo. After Pet Airways ceased operations in 2011, its parent, PAWS Pet Company Inc., transferred to the pharmaceutical space, and changed its name to Praxsyn Corporation.

As of May 2024, the Pet Airways website indicates that the airline plans to resume flights after acquiring funding to restart the company.

== History ==
The company was founded by Dan Wiesel and Alysa Binder, who got the idea when planning a trip with their dog. The launch of the company was funded by a group of investors.

Operations continued from 2009 to 2011 when operations ceased. By the time operations ceased, over 9,000 pets had been flown.

In February 2012, The New York Times reported that Pet Airways had run into financial problems. In a regulatory filing that month, the company said, "We have experienced a history of losses and have yet to begin generating positive cash flows from operations and, as a result, our auditors have raised substantial doubt about our ability to continue as a going concern." In 2011, the airline permanently ceased operations.

== Services ==
When the airline began in 2009, airfare per pet started at $150, and was based on the pet's size and the distance traveled. The average cost was about $500 per flight, though an individual flight could cost over $1,200 for a large animal. Flights could be booked online.

The pets ("pawsengers", in their terminology) were checked into a pet lounge at each airport at which the airline operated. Owners could track their pets en route via the website. Airline staff gave all pets pre-boarding walks and bathroom breaks. During the flight, the pets were under the care of trained attendants, checked on at least every 15 minutes for the flight's duration.

== Destinations ==
The company launched its first weekly flight on July 14, 2009, serving nine US cities—New York City, Baltimore/Washington, D.C., Chicago, Omaha, Fort Lauderdale, Atlanta, Phoenix, Denver, and Los Angeles. In April 2011, it announced addition of three Texas destinations (Dallas, Houston and Austin), St. Louis, and Orlando, but did not commence service. Pet Airways announced plans to expand to 25 cities by late 2011.

As of April 2011, Pet Airways flew to 11 destinations:

Arizona

- Mesa (Falcon Field, Phoenix metropolitan area)

California

- Hawthorne, Los Angeles County (Hawthorne Municipal Airport)

Colorado

- Broomfield (Rocky Mountain Metropolitan Airport, Denver metropolitan area)

Florida

- Fort Lauderdale (Fort Lauderdale–Hollywood International Airport), Orlando

Georgia

- Atlanta (DeKalb–Peachtree Airport)

Illinois

- Chicago (Midway International Airport)

Maryland

- Baltimore (Baltimore/Washington International Thurgood Marshall Airport)

Nebraska

- Omaha (Eppley Airfield)

New York

- Farmingdale (Republic Airport, New York metropolitan area)
