= Sol Dominicana Airlines =

IATA	ICAO	Call sign
DA	SDA	SOL AIRLINES
- Founded: February 26, 2007
- Ceased operations: 2009
- Hubs: La Romana International Airport
- Fleet size: 1
- Headquarters: La Romana, Dominican Republic
- Key people: Eduardo S. Costa (President); José Jourdain (General Manager)
- Website: www.vuelesol.com

Sol Dominicana Airlines (also known as Sol Airlines) was a Dominican airline that operated charter flights from the Dominican Republic. The airline's main hub was La Romana International Airport.

== Destinations ==
Sol Dominicana Airlines planned to operate schedule flights to 8 cities, including Aruba, Buenos Aires, Cancún, Caracas, Curaçao, New York City, São Paulo, and Toronto.

== Fleet ==
The Sol Dominicana Airlines fleet consisted of the following aircraft (as of September 2007):

Sol Dominicana Airlines fleet
Aircraft	Total	Orders	Passengers (Economy)	Notes
BAe 146-200	1	4	88	
Boeing 767-200ER	—	2	206	
Boeing 747-300	—	1	460	Intended for charter flights
Total	1	7		

The first airline's first aircraft, a BAe-146, arrived at La Romana from Mexico on June 7, 2007.

== See also ==
- List of defunct airlines of the Dominican Republic
