= MAT Airways =

IATA	ICAO	Call sign
6F	MKD	MATAIRWAYS
- Founded: March 2009
- Ceased operations: 2011
- Hubs: Skopje "Alexander the Great" Airport
- Secondary hubs: Ohrid "St. Paul the Apostle" Airport
- Fleet size: 1
- Destinations: 11
- Parent company: Kon Tiki Travel Serbia
- Headquarters: Skopje, North Macedonia
- Website: http://www.matairways.mk/

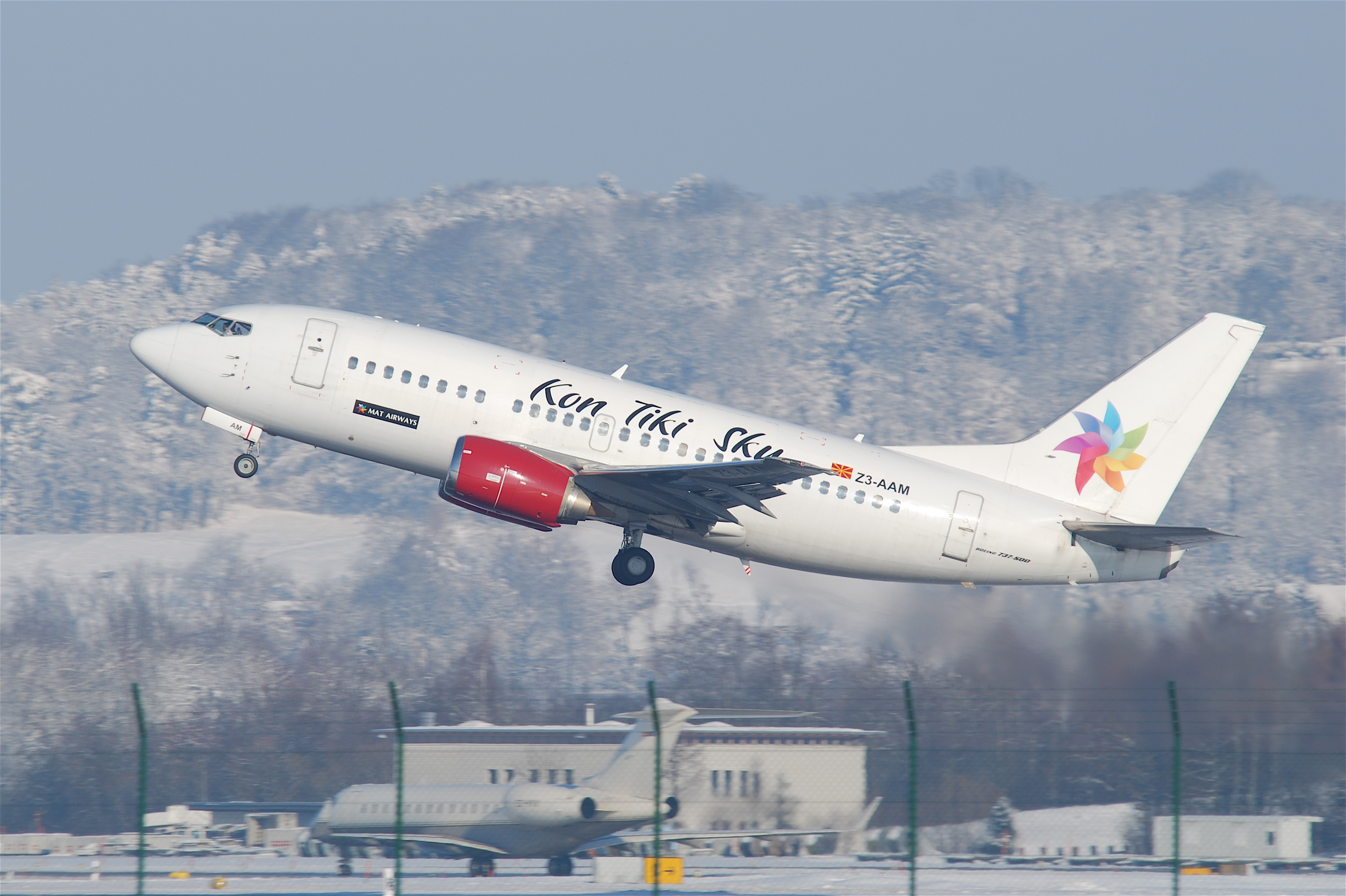
The Boeing 737-500 of MAT Airways

MAT Airways was an airline based in Skopje, North Macedonia. Its main base was Skopje International Airport.

== History ==
The biggest Serbian tourist agency Kon Tiki Travel, Belgrade, and Metropolitan Investment Group, Belgrade, in accordance with Macedonian statutory regulations have established the new air transport company. The airline leased its first aircraft from Aviogenex, however, this plane has been returned to its owner.

Skywings International Airlines, Macedonia's largest charter airline, was left without an operating license and decided to merge with its rival MAT, with the aim of reducing costs and optimizing operations. As a result, MAT operated 2 aircraft. In May 2011 Skywings decided to split from MAT, only a month after they merged.

On 4 July 2011, it was announced that MAT Airways has suspended its services. Their only aircraft is currently grounded and it's not announced when they will resume flights. The Macedonian Civil Aviation Agency says that it did not play a part in MAT's service suspension and adds that the airline has a permit to operate flights from Skopje and Ohrid to Zurich, Düsseldorf, Berlin, Hamburg, Vienna and Copenhagen until 15 June 2012.

On 15 July, MAT Airways resumed their services. The airline voluntarily grounded its sole aircraft, a Boeing 737-500. According to MAT's management it did so in order to review its position on the market in face of increased competition. However, other sources claim that the airline has been having financial problems.

== Destinations ==
According to the Skopje Airport and MAT Airways websites, MAT operated the following service (as of May 2011): The airline is now closed down.

=== Europe ===
- Belgium
  - Brussels - Brussels Airport
- Germany
  - Berlin - Berlin Schönefeld Airport
  - Düsseldorf - Düsseldorf Airport
  - Hamburg - Hamburg Airport
  - Stuttgart - Stuttgart Airport
- Italy
  - Rome - Leonardo da Vinci-Fiumicino Airport
- Macedonia
  - Ohrid - Ohrid "St. Paul the Apostle" Airport [Secondary Hub]
  - Skopje - Skopje "Alexander the Great" Airport [Hub]
- Switzerland
  - Zurich - Zurich Airport

== Fleet ==
The MAT Airways fleet included the following aircraft (as of 7 July 2011):

MAT Airways Fleet
Aircraft	Total	Orders	Passengers (Business/Economy)	Operated
Boeing 737-500	1	0	12/108	1
Total	1	0		
