= List of defunct airlines of Slovakia =

This is a list of defunct airlines of Slovakia.

Airline	Image	IATA	ICAO	Callsign	Commenced operations	Ceased operations	Notes
ACG Air Cargo Global		CW	CCC	GLOBAL CARGO	2013	2020	
Air Saravi		2P	SRV		1993	1995	
Air Slovakia		GM	SVK	SLOVAKIA	1993	2010	
Air Terrex Slovakia			TRX		1993	1994	Renamed/merged to Air Slovakia
Central Charter Airlines Slovakia		9C	CCS		2010	2011	Rebranded as Samair
Danube Wings		V5	VPA	VIP TAXI	2008	2013	
Dubnica Air					2003	2016	
Opera Jet			OPJ	OPERA JET	2007	2014	
Quick Duck Airlines					2014	2015	
Samair		9C	CCS	SKYSPIRIT	2011	2014	
Seagle Air		SJ	CGL	SEAGLE	1995	2009	
SK Air					1997	1999	
SkyEurope		NE	ESK	RELAX	2001	2009	
Slov-Air		OI	OIR		1969	2001	
Slovak Airlines		6Q	SLL	SLOV LINE	1995	2007	
Slovakian Airlines			SVL	SLOVAKIAN	2011	2012	
Tatra Air			TTR		1992	1999	
Travel Service Slovakia		6D	TVQ	SLOVAKTRAVEL	2010	2018	Rebranded as Smartwings Slovakia
VIP wings					2002	2013	

== See also ==
- List of airlines of Slovakia
- List of airports in Slovakia
