= List of airlines of Slovakia =

This is a list of airlines currently operating in Slovakia.

== Charter airlines ==
Airline	Image	IATA	ICAO	Callsign	Commenced operations	Notes
Aero Slovakia			ASO	AERO NITRA	1992	
AirExplore		ED	AXE	GALILEO	2010	
Go2Sky		6G	RLX	RELAX	2013	
Smartwings Slovakia		6D	TVQ	SLOVAKTRAVEL	2010	

== Government airlines ==
Airline	Image	IATA	ICAO	Callsign	Commenced operations	Notes
Slovak Government Flying Service			SSG	SLOVAK GOVERNMENT	1993	

== Air rescue ==
Airline	Image	IATA	ICAO	Callsign	Commenced operations	Notes
Air – Transport Europe			EAT	TRANS EUROPE	1990	

== See also ==
- List of airlines
- List of defunct airlines of Slovakia
