= OPJ =

OPJ may stand for:

- Officier de Police Judiciaire, an officer of the police in France
- Opera Jet (ICAO), a former private jet operator based in Bratislava, Slovakia
- .OPJ, the filename extension for the file format used by the graphing software Origin
- Otto Porter Jr., American professional basketball player
