= Slov-Air =

Slovakian airline

IATA	ICAO	Call sign
OI	OIR	—
- Founded: 1924 (as a department of Bata Shoes)
- Ceased operations: 2001 (inactive for some years earlier)
- Operating bases: Prague Ruzyně Airport; Bratislava Airport
- Headquarters: Prague; Bratislava (from 1969)

Slov-Air (also styled Slov Air or Slovair) was an airline from Czechoslovakia (Slovakia following the country's dissolution), which provided services for agriculture, civil engineering, helicopter emergency medical service and industry.

== History ==
The roots of the airline can be traced back to 1924, when the Bata Shoe Company began building an in-house airline for its corporate travel, operating small aircraft or gyrocopters like the Cierva C.30. Following the establishment of communism in Czechoslovakia in 1948, Bata Shoes was nationalised and the airline was re-organized as Svitlet.

In 1950, ČSA was established as the state airline of Czechoslovakia and Svitlet was transformed into a ČSA department, operating as Agrolet. In 1955, Agrolet once more became an independent entity as a utility airline, principally for agricultural flights. It operated out of Prague Ruzyně Airport, using the following aircraft types:

- Fieseler Fi 156 Storch, Polikarpov Po-2 Kukuruznik, Antonov An-2, L-60 Brigadýr and Z-37 Čmelák for agricultural services
- L-200 Morava for medical and corporate passenger transport
- Mi-1 and Mi-4 helicopters for civil engineering projects

On 1 January 1969, Agrolet was renamed Slov-Air and moved its headquarters to Bratislava, catering to demand in the Slovak half of the country. Starting in 1972, the helicopter fleet was modernised with the acquisition of Mil Mi-8s.

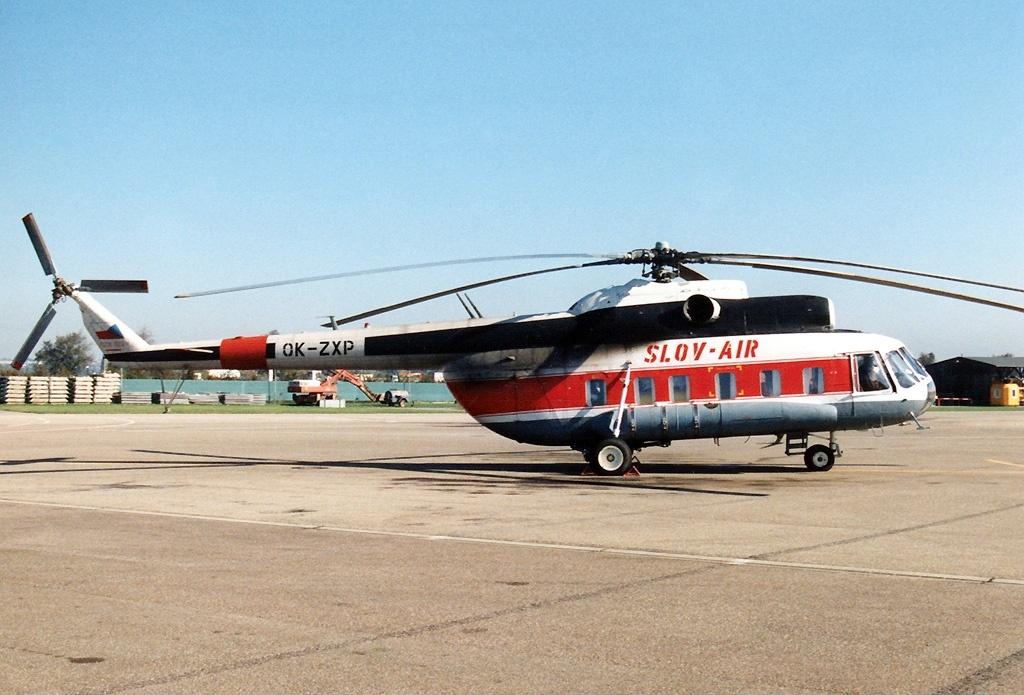
Mil Mi-8PS, Slov-Air AN0263913

Following the Velvet Revolution in 1989 and the dissolution of Czechoslovakia in 1993, plans were made to make Slov-Air the flag carrier of Slovakia. The plans were dropped when Slovak Airlines, an all-new state airline, was created in 1995. Slov-Air was dismantled over the following years and split into several companies providing agricultural, medical, military and passenger services, most notably Aero Slovakia. But Slov-Air's airline license was only officially revoked in 2001.

== Accidents and incidents ==
- On 31 July 1969, a Slov-Air Antonov An-2 (registered OK-KHD) crashed near Drogomyśl, Poland.
- On 18 April 1972, a Slov-Air Let L-410 Turbolet was hijacked during a scheduled flight from Prague to Mariánské Lázně by two of the nine passengers on board, who demanded to be taken to non-communist West Germany. The aircraft diverted to Nuremberg, where, in accordance with West German procedure at the time, all who wished to do so could claim political asylum.
- On 8 June 1972, a similar situation occurred during a Slov-Air flight from Mariánské Lázně to Prague (operated by a Let L-410, registered OK-ADN, and carrying two pilots and fifteen passengers). An armed hijacker entered the cockpit and demanded to be taken to West Germany. In the ensuing fracas, one of the pilots was shot dead. The aircraft did not have enough fuel to fly to Munich as the hijacker intended, so an off-airport landing in a field near Weiding was performed. The perpetrator as well as nine passengers fled the scene.
- In September 1981, a Slov-Air An-2 (registered OK-KIM) crashed near Znojmo following another hijacking attempt.
- On 25 August 1982, another Slov-Air An-2 (registered OK-JIK) crashed near Smedava.
- On 26 August 1985, a Slov-Air Mil Mi-2 Hoplite (registered OK-GIT) struck a hill in dense fog and crashed near Lubon Wielki in the Island Beskids Mountain Range in Poland.
- On 13 March 1992, a Slov-Air Let L-410 (registered OK-PDI) carrying nine passengers was damaged beyond repair in a crash landing at Žilina Airport.
