= SmartWings (brand) =

Airline brand of the Czech Republic

- Commenced operations: 2004
- Ceased operations: 2018

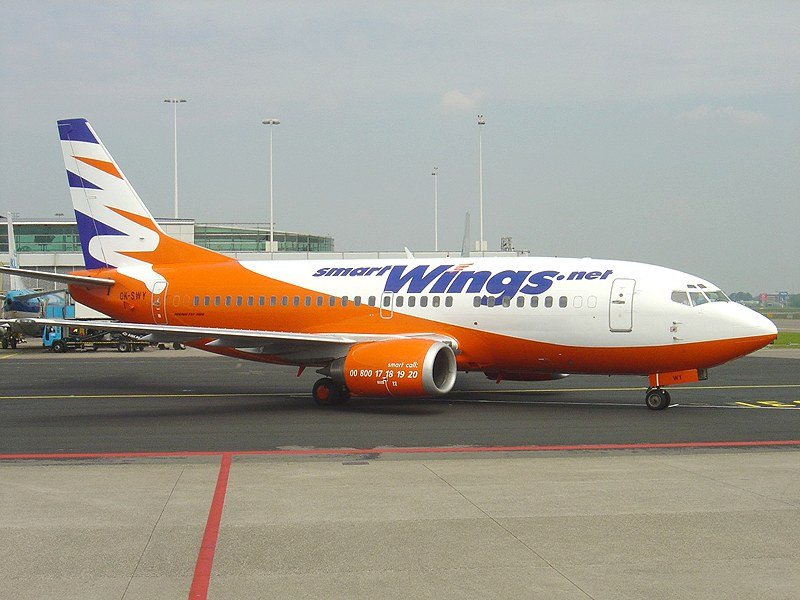
Boeing 737-500 in SmartWings livery

SmartWings was the low-cost Brand of the Czech charter airline Travel Service. Travel Service operated scheduled flights to several European metropolitan and leisure destinations under the brand from its base at Václav Havel Airport Prague. In 2018, Travel Service renamed itself to Smartwings.

== History ==
The brand was established in 2004 by Travel Service, which specialized in leisure charter flights at that time, to offer low-cost scheduled flights. For example, after the bankruptcy of SkyEurope, the company started scheduled services to Paris and Rome.

In October 2017 it was announced that Travel Service planned to move all of its operations under the SmartWings brand.

In 2018, Travel Service has been renamed to Smartwings.

== Destinations ==
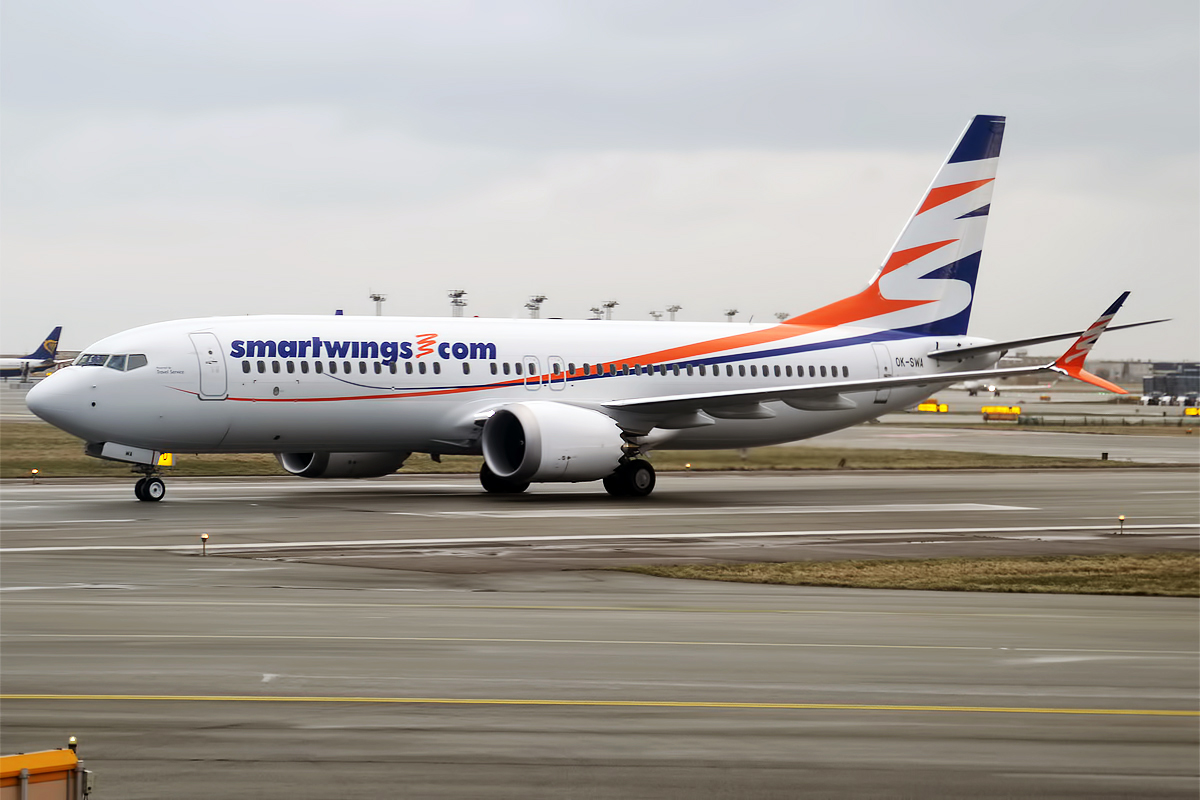
SmartWings Boeing 737 MAX 8 operated by Travel Service

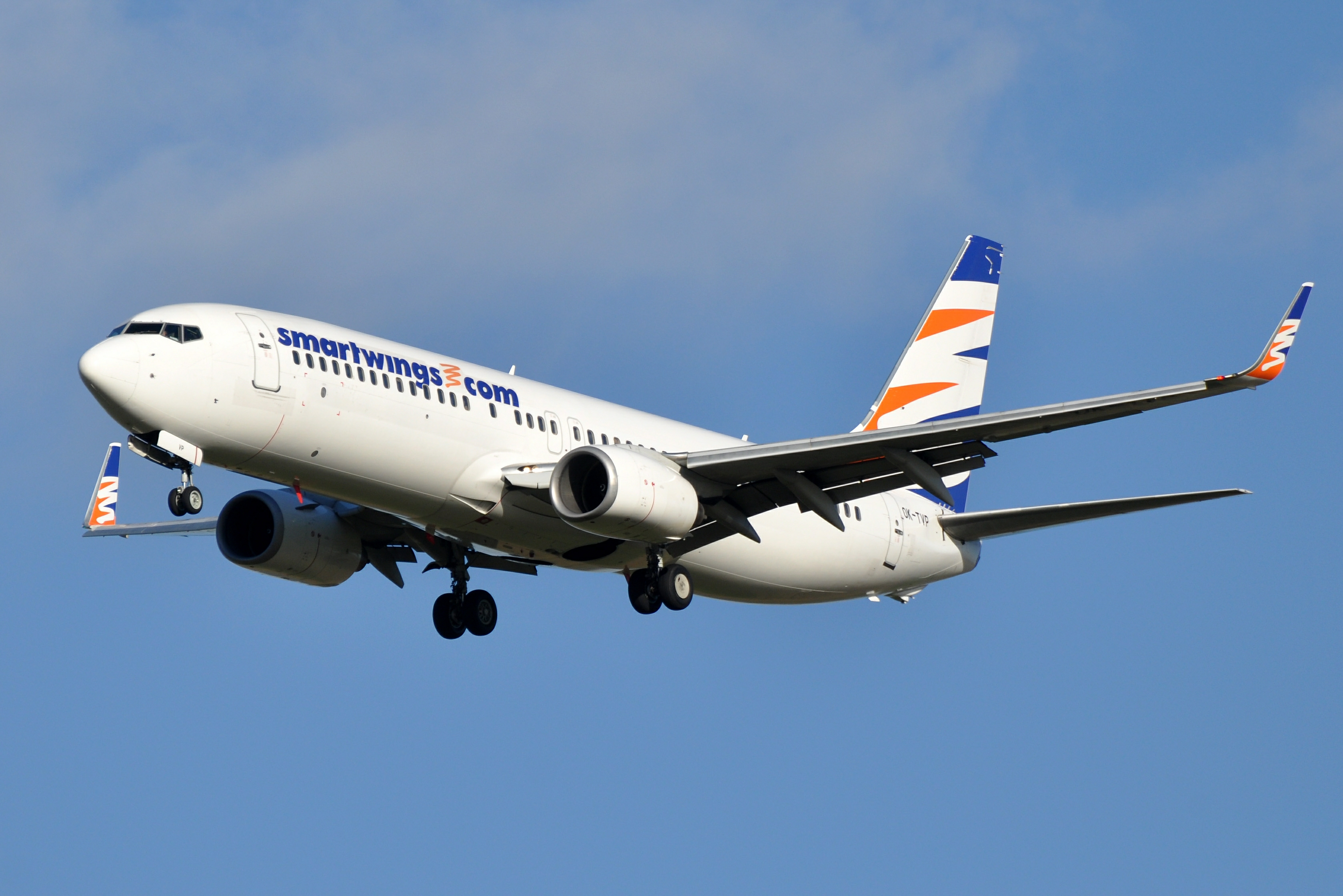
A SmartWings branded Boeing 737-800 operated by Travel Service

== Fleet ==
As of October 2018, the Smartwings fleet consisted of the following aircraft operated by Travel Service:

Smartwings fleet
Aircraft	In service	Orders	Passengers	Notes
Boeing 737-700	2	—	148	
Boeing 737-800	22	—	189	2 leased to Sunwing Airlines, 1 leased to Air Transat
Boeing 737 MAX 8	6	33	189	Deliveries 2018–2023
Total	30	33		
