= Air Cargo Global =

Slovakian cargo airline

ACG Air Cargo Global
| IATA | ICAO | Call sign |
|---|---|---|
| CW | CCC | GLOBAL CARGO |
- Founded: 2013
- Commenced operations: 26 August 2014
- Ceased operations: 2020
- Fleet size: 3 (2020)
- Website: www.acg-air.com

ACG Air Cargo Global was a Slovak cargo airline based at Bratislava Airport which operated charter flights and some scheduled services. The airline ceased operations at the beginning of 2020.

== History ==
ACG Air Cargo Global was co-founded in 2013 by Slovak tycoon Igor Bondarenko and former Aeroflot-Cargo CEO Andrey Goryashko, with Bondarenko holding a majority share. Its livery and fleet were inherited from predecessor Air Cargo Germany, which ceased operations earlier in April 2013.

ACG's first commercial flight was a UNICEF charter on 26 August 2014, carrying 100 tons of medicines and medical equipment between Billund, Denmark and Monrovia, Liberia A twice-weekly service between Oslo and Tianjin began in January 2019 to carry Norwegian seafood to China.

None of the airline's three B747-400BCF have flown since December 2019. This has led to speculation from aviation news sites that the company had ceased operations; ACG subsequently issued a statement in March 2020 announcing that while they had not completely shut down, they had decided to restructure the company and close their office in Frankfurt. ACG employees were allegedly laid off in February 2020 – additionally, ACG's website remains inactive and all three 747-400Fs were in service with other airlines as of October 2020.

== Fleet ==
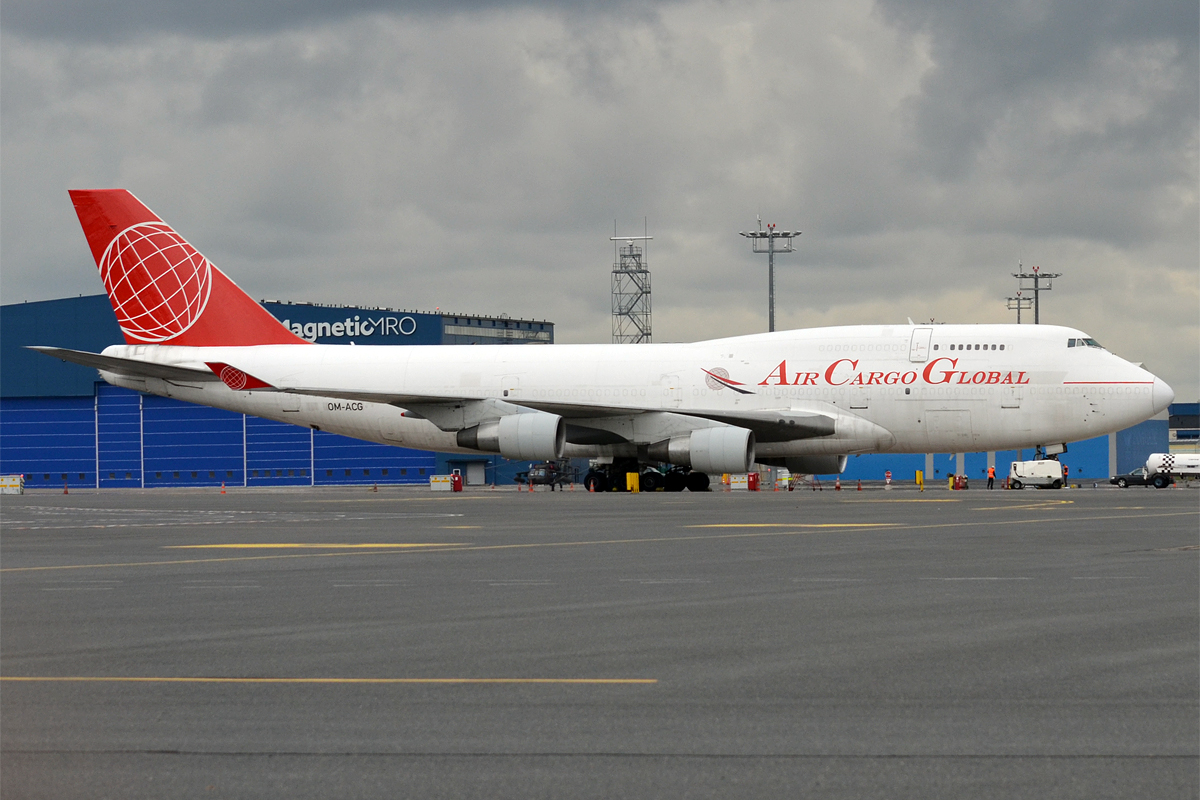
Boeing 747-400F

ACG operated four B747-400BCFs throughout its lifetime.

== Incidents and accidents ==
On 13 November 2019, Boeing 747-400BCF OM-ACG operating from Liège to Tel Aviv suffered a blown tyre upon landing. There were no fatalities but there was damage to the fuselage.
