= Samair =

Slovakian charter airline

IATA	ICAO	Call sign
9C	CCS	SKYSPIRIT
- Founded: 2010
- Ceased operations: 2014
- Hubs: M. R. Štefánik Airport
- Fleet size: 4
- Destinations: Charters
- Parent company: Al Sayegh Airlines
- Headquarters: Bratislava, Slovakia
- Website: www.samair.sk

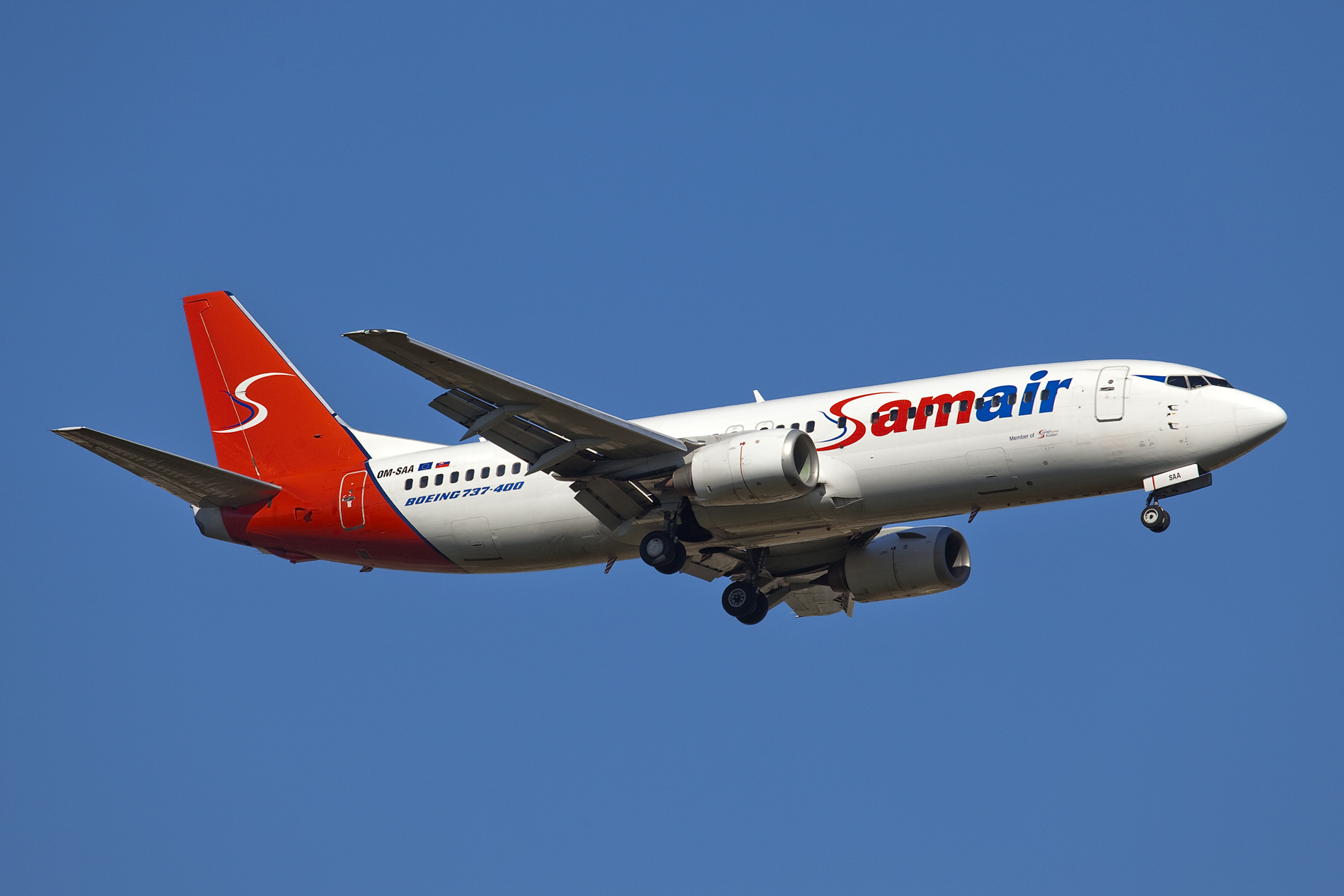
Samair Boeing 737

Samair was a charter airline based in Bratislava, Slovakia, that operated charter flights out of M. R. Štefánik Airport. It was founded in 2010 inheritor of Central Charter Airlines Slovakia.

== Destinations ==
Samair operated flights from Bratislava, Brno, Budapest, Košice and Sliač to the following destinations:

Africa

- Egypt
  - Hurghada - Hurghada Airport
- Morocco
  - Agadir
- Tunisia
  - Monastir - Habib Bourguiba Airport

Europe

- Bulgaria
  - Burgas - Burgas Airport
- Greece
  - Corfu
  - Heraklion - Heraklion International Airport
  - Keffalinia
  - Kos - Kos Island International Airport
  - Thessaloniki
  - Zakynthos - Zakynthos International Airport
- Hungary
  - Budapest - Budapest Ferenc Liszt International Airport
- Romania
  - Cluj-Napoca - Cluj-Napoca International Airport (begins 25 October 2013)
- Turkey
  - Antalya - Antalya Airport
  - İzmir - Adnan Menderes Airport

== Fleet ==
As of March 2012, Samair has four Boeing 737-400.

Samair fleet
Aircraft	In Service	Orders	Passengers
Boeing 737-400	4	0	165
