= Košice International Airport =

Airport serving Košice, Slovakia

Košice International Airport Medzinárodné letisko Košice
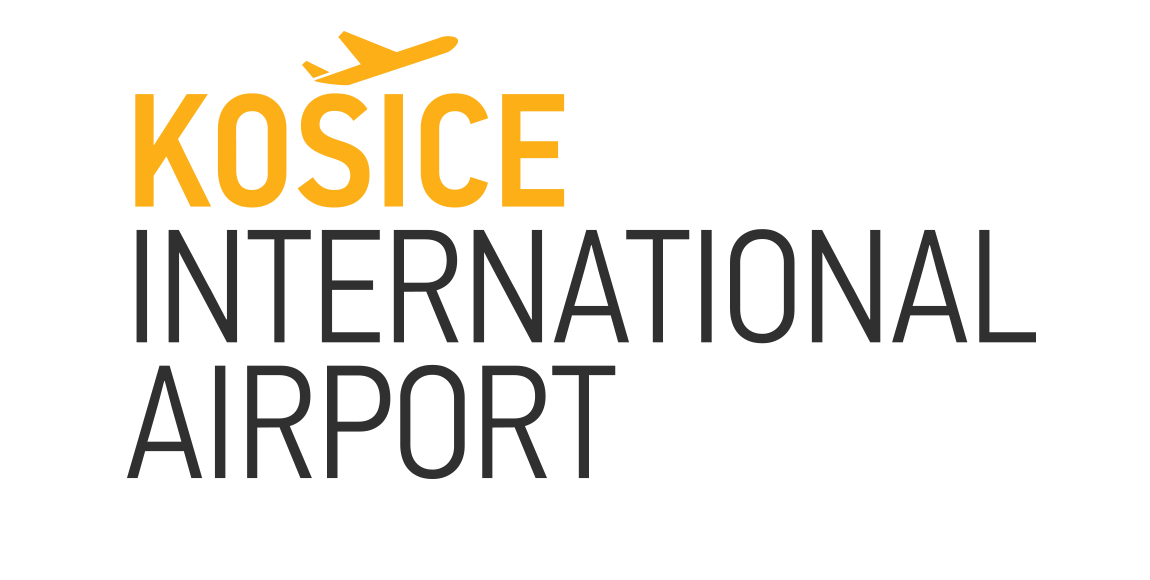

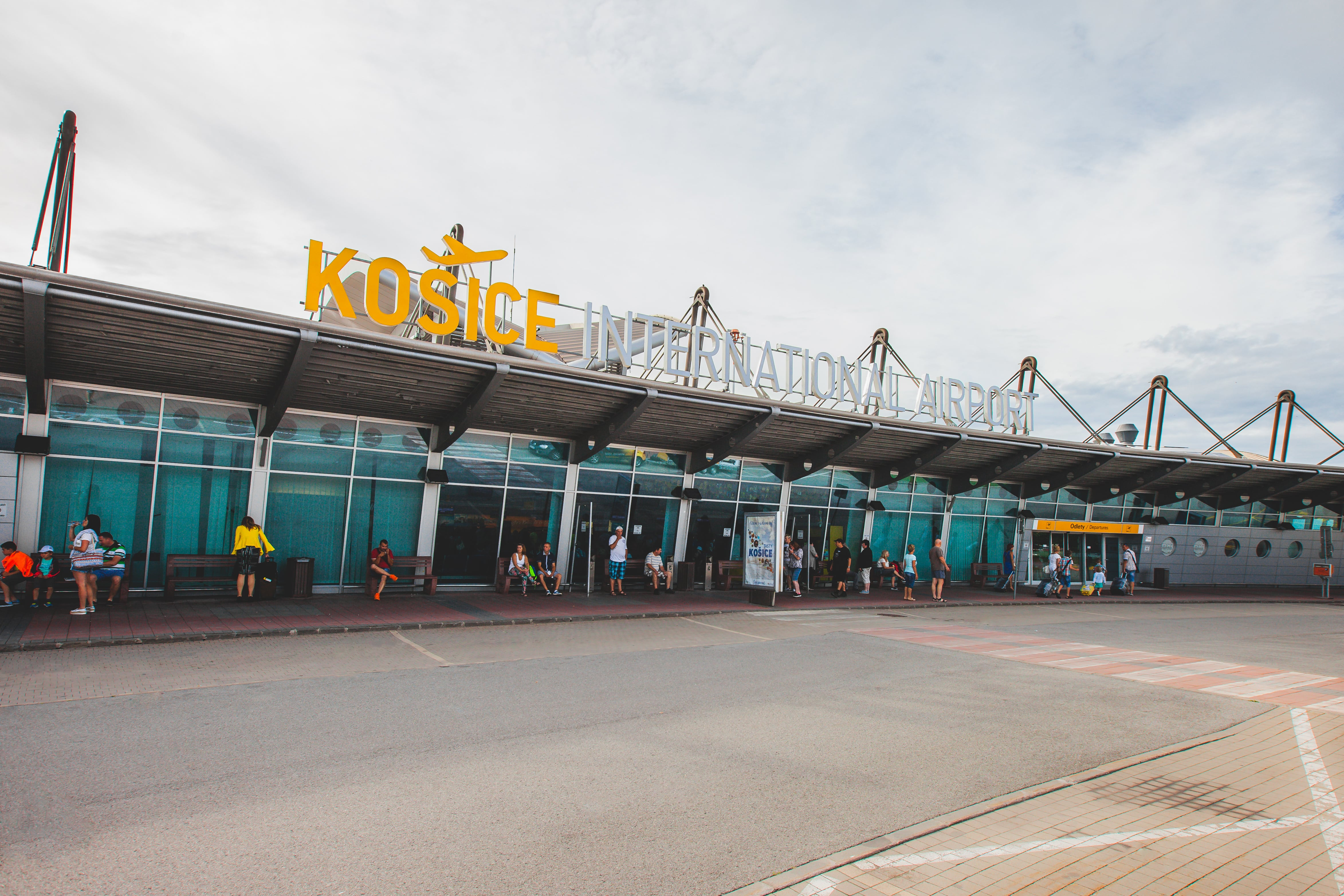
- IATA: KSC; ICAO: LZKZ

Summary
- Airport type: Public
- Operator: Letisko Košice - Airport Košice, a.s.
- Serves: Košice, Slovakia
- Location: Barca
- Elevation AMSL: 755 ft (230 m)
- Coordinates: 48°39′47″N 021°14′28″E
- Website: airportkosice.sk

Map
- Location of airport in Slovakia

Runways
Direction	Length		Surface
Direction	m	ft	Surface
01/19	3,100	10,171	Asphalt

Statistics (2025)
- Passengers: 827,798 ▲12%
- Aircraft movements: 4,398 ▲13.0%
- Source: Vienna Airport

Košice International Airport (Slovak: Medzinárodné letisko Košice) (IATA: KSC, ICAO: LZKZ) is an international airport serving Košice, Slovakia. It is the second largest international airport in Slovakia. It is located 6 km (3.7 mi) to the south of St Elisabeth Cathedral, 230 m (750 ft) above sea level, covering an area of 3.50 km^{2} (1.35 sq mi). It serves both scheduled and charter, domestic and international flights.

Košice Airport operates 12 direct flights to the following destinations - Prague (Ryanair), Warsaw - Fryderyk Chopin Airport (LOT Polish Airlines), Zürich (Swiss International Air Lines), Vienna (Austrian Airlines), London - to London Luton Airport (Wizz Air) and London-Stansted Airport (Ryanair), Liverpool (Ryanair), Dublin (Ryanair), Zadar (Ryanair), Bratislava (Wizz Air), Malaga (Ryanair), Rome (Wizz Air). More than 300 destinations are available with a maximum of one change.

On 13 September 2023, the airport announced the arrival of Swiss International Air Lines, which launched a direct route from Košice to Zurich on 27 March 2024. In summer 2024, Ryanair launched a seasonal route from Košice to Zadar and resumed its direct route to Dublin.

With the launch of the 2025 summer flight schedule, Ryanair’s direct route from Košice to Zadar has been reinstated. The first flight took off on April 1, 2025.

== History ==
Construction of the airport began in 1950s near the suburb of Barca. In 1954, construction began on the first part of the new passenger terminal, hangar and new control tower. In 1955, direct flights began between Košice and Prague. The power supply was enhanced by more powerful transformers in 1962. Increasing traffic required a larger passenger terminal by the mid 1960s. The foundation of the SNP Air Force Academy in 1973 strengthened aviation in the then republic of Czechoslovakia. Between 1974 and 1977, the runway was increased by 1,100 m (3,600 ft), the power supply rebuilt and a lighting system installed to meet CAT II ICAO specifications. Military aviation at the airport stopped in 2004.

Another extensive reconstruction of the runways and equipment area took place in 1992-1993. In 2001, the construction of a new terminal began, which was opened in 2004 and in 2005 was awarded the title Construction of the Year 2005. In 2004, the business company Letisko Košice - Airport Kosice, a.s. was established, in which a strategic partner joined in 2006. In 2007, the handling area was expanded, which increased the number of stands.

After the completion of the new terminal, the airport was privatized; currently the largest share (66%) of business in the airport is KSC Holding, a. s., whose majority shareholder is Vienna-Schwechat Airport, and the remaining share (34%) is owned by the Slovak Republic.

== Airport charges ==
Košice Airport charged fees comparable to nearby airports in Vienna, Prague and Budapest in 2011. To attract new carriers and fly new routes from Košice, the airport offered a 50% discount on fees.

== Terminals ==
The total area of Terminal 1 is 4,456 m^{2} (47,960 sq ft), of which more than 3,500 m^{2} (38,000 sq ft) is designed for the travelling public. Facilities include international and domestic departure and domestic gates, aviation and travel agencies, a nursery, a quiet room, and comfortable business lounge. There are also restaurants, car rental booths and small shops.

== Airlines and destinations ==
The following airlines operate scheduled services to and from Košice Airport:

Airlines	Destinations
Austrian Airlines	Vienna
LOT Polish Airlines	Warsaw–Chopin
Ryanair	Dublin, Liverpool, London–Stansted, Málaga, Prague; Seasonal: Zadar
Smartwings	Seasonal: Burgas, Heraklion, Larnaca, Palma de Mallorca, Rhodes, Zakynthos
Swiss International Air Lines	Zurich
Wizz Air	Bratislava, London–Luton, Rome–Fiumicino

== Statistics ==
Year	Passengers	Change	Cargo (tonnes)
2012	235,754	▼	
2013	237,165	▲0.6%	
2014	356,750	▲50.4%	
2015	410,400	▲15.0%	
2016	436,696	▲6.4%	88
2017	496,708	▲13.7%	106
2018	542,026	▲9.1%	65
2019	558,064	▲3.0%	38
2020	96,428	▼82.6%	5
2021	168 742	▲73.3 %	
2022	542,864	▲222.1%	
2023	625,053	▲15.1%	
2024	739,010	▲18.2%	
2025	827,798	▲12%	

Busiest charter routes to and from Košice Airport (summer 2023)
Destination	Number of passengers	Airlines
Antalya	77,483	Smartwings, Freebird, Travel Service
Larnaca	24,920	Cyprus Airways,Smartwings
Hurghada	18,941	FlyEgypt, Air Cairo

=== Busiest routes ===
Top ten busiest routes from Košice in 2024
Rank	Airport	Passengers	Airlines
1	Antalya	96,506	Corendon Airlines, Freebird Airlines, Smartwings, Tailwind Airlines
2	London Luton	92,392	Wizz Air
3	Vienna	86,345	Austrian Airlines
4	Prague	81,725	Ryanair
5	London Stansted	78,091	Ryanair
6	Liverpool	38,941	Ryanair
7	Warsaw–Chopin	31,234	LOT Polish Airlines
8	Larnaca	28,896	Smartwings, TUS Airways
9	Dublin	27,700	Ryanair
10	Zurich	27,297	Swiss International Air Lines

== Ground transport ==
Košice Airport can easily be accessed by car, taxi or bus as it is located 6 km (3.7 mi) from the city centre.

=== Bus ===
Bus 23 is operated by the local public transport company. It connects the airport and the station square, where you can find a bus and train station. The bus route passes through the city center and it takes about 20 minutes.

=== Car ===
The airport lies directly adjacent to the highway which leads to the ring road. Passengers driving their own cars can park at the airport parking lots. You have a choice of 3 parking lots: short-term parking P1, long-term parking P2, long-term parking P3 for parking during longer journeys, the minimum parking time there is 8 hours. Your car will be monitored by a camera system throughout the parking period. Car rental facilities are also available at the airport.
