= Riga Aviation Museum =

Museum in Riga, Latvia

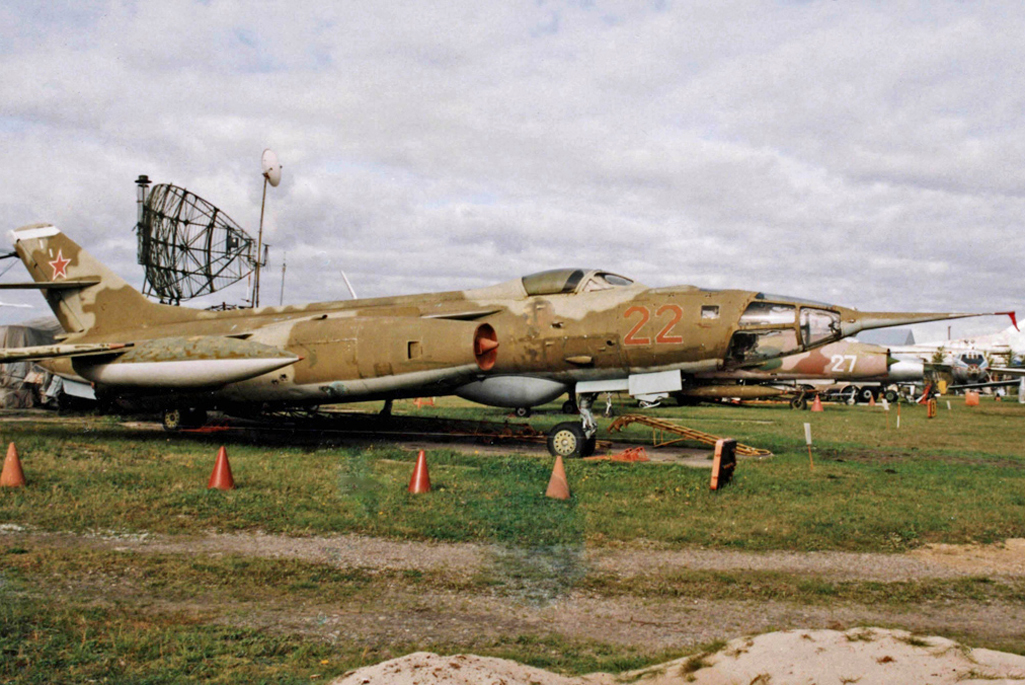
- Soviet Air Force Yakovlev Yak-28R displayed at the museum
- Established: 1956
- Location: Riga International Airport
- Coordinates: 56°55′08″N 23°57′35″E
- Type: Aviation museum
- Website: en.airmuseum.lv

Riga Aviation Museum is an aviation museum in Riga, Latvia.

== Location and history ==
The museum was located on the grounds of Riga International Airport and is regularly open for public viewing. Its Latvian name is Rīgas aviācijas muzejs. It was established in 1956 by Victor Talpa, who worked for the Latvian Civil Aviation Administration, but it was privatised in 1997. In 2022, the entire museum was moved to Skulte. The new location is also right next to the airport.

== Exhibits ==
Some of the aircraft and helicopters at the museum are:

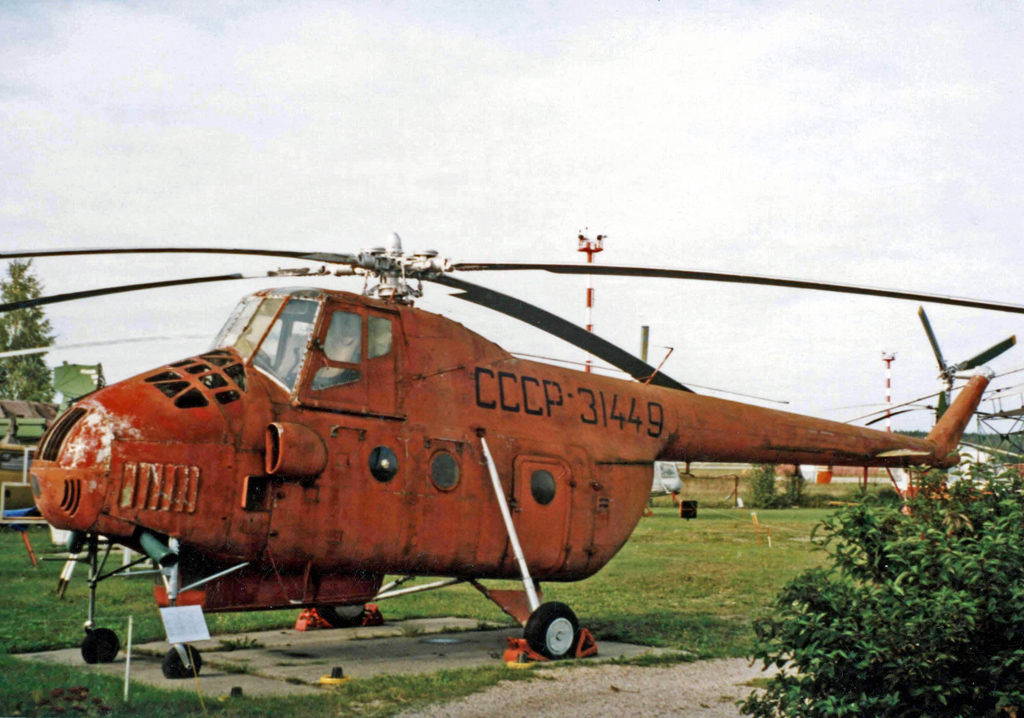
Mil Mi-4 "Hound" ex Aeroflot exhibited at Riga in arctic markings.

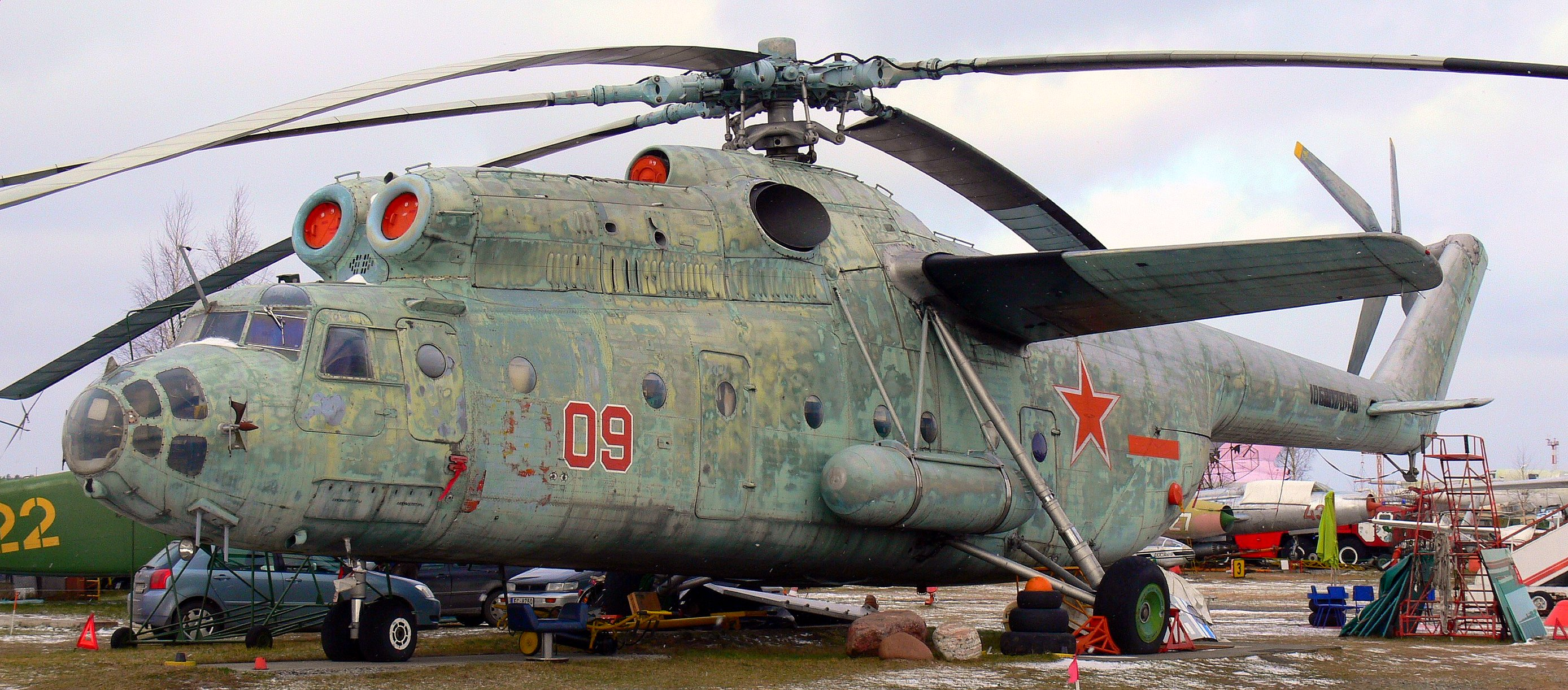
Mil Mi-6 "Hook" at Riga Aviation Museum (has been repainted since photo).

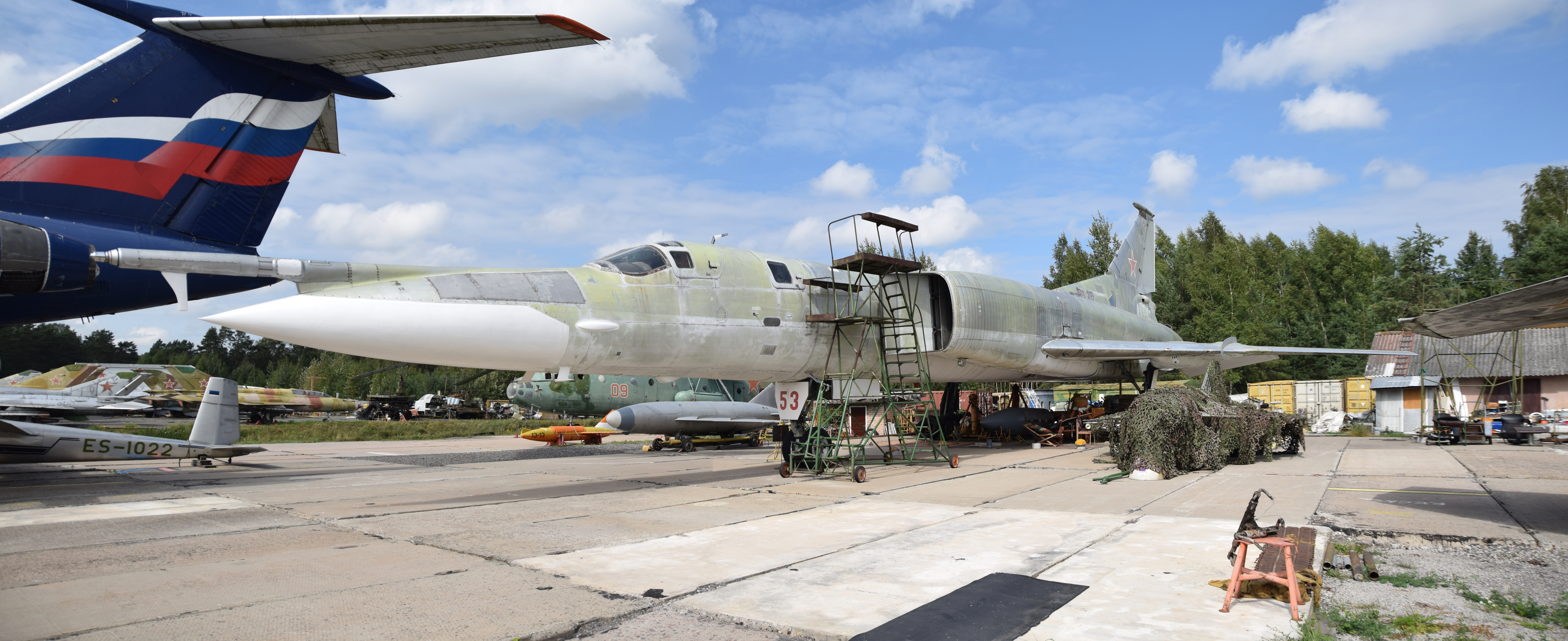
A Tupolev Tu-22M1 as a highlight of the exhibition

- Aero L-29 Delfin
- Antonov An-2
- Antonov An-24
- Mikoyan-Gurevich MiG-15
- Mikoyan-Gurevich MiG-21
- Mikoyan-Gurevich MiG-23
- Mikoyan-Gurevich MiG-25RBS (Foxbat-D)
- Mikoyan MiG-27
- Mikoyan MiG-29
- Mil Mi-2
- Mil Mi-4
- Mil Mi-6
- Mil Mi-8
- Mil Mi-24
- Sukhoi Su-7
- Sukhoi Su-15
- Sukhoi Su-22
- Yakovlev Yak-28R
- Tupolev Tu-22M1
- Tupolev Tu-134
- Zlín Z-37A

Most of the museum's aircraft collection is displayed outdoors, and therefore exposed to the elements.

== See also ==
- Spilve Airport
- List of aviation museums

== Bibliography ==
- Ogden, Bob (2006). Aviation Museums and Collections of Mainland Europe. Tonbridge, Kent: Air-Britain (Historians) Ltd. ISBN 0-85130-375-7.
