= Slovakian Airlines =

Slovakian airline (2011–2012)

IATA	ICAO	Call sign
-	SVL	SLOVAKIAN
- Founded: 2011
- Ceased operations: 2012
- Fleet size: 1
- Headquarters: Bratislava, Slovakia

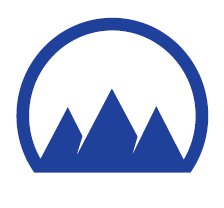
Logo of Slovakian Airline

Slovakian Airlines was a planned Slovak scheduled and charter airline based at Bratislava. It had one leased Boeing 737-500. It started to fly in 2011, but was sold after financial difficulty and ceased all operations in 2012.
