= Air Slovakia =

Slovak airline, 1993–2010

IATA	ICAO	Call sign
GM	SVK	SLOVAKIA
- Founded: 1993
- Commenced operations: 1994
- Ceased operations: 2010
- Operating bases: M. R. Štefánik Airport
- Fleet size: 5 (at closure)
- Headquarters: Bratislava, Slovakia
- Key people: Riqbal Singh Sidhu (CEO)
- Website: www.airslovakia.sk (defunct)

Air Slovakia was an airline based in Bratislava, Slovakia, operating out of M. R. Štefánik Airport. The airline offered scheduled and chartered passenger flights, as well as aircraft lease (ACMI).

== History ==
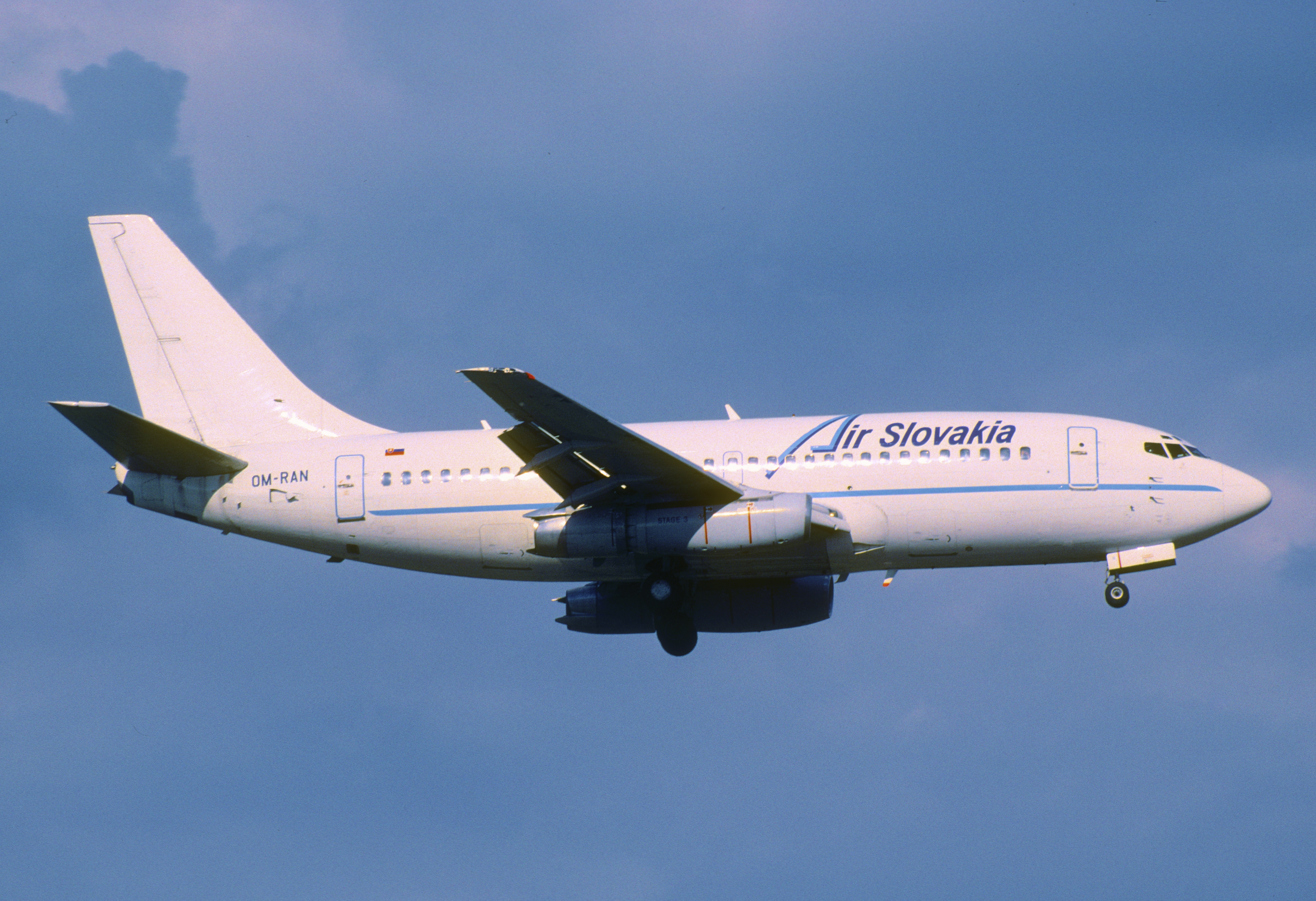
An Air Slovakia Boeing 737-200 landing (2005)

The airline was established on 2 June 1993 as Air Terrex, with its first revenue flight (from Bratislava to Tel Aviv) taking place in January 1994. The new name Air Slovakia was adopted in 1995, following the re-positioning of the airline after the dissolution of Czechoslovakia.

In October 2006 the airline was sold by Indian businessman Ninder Singh Chohan and purchased by Indian businessman Harjinder Singh Sidhu, who aimed at focusing the airline towards his home country, launching several new destinations.

On 2 March 2010, Air Slovakia had its AOC removed by Slovak authorities with immediate effect, which led to the airline being dissolved in June 2010.

== Destinations ==
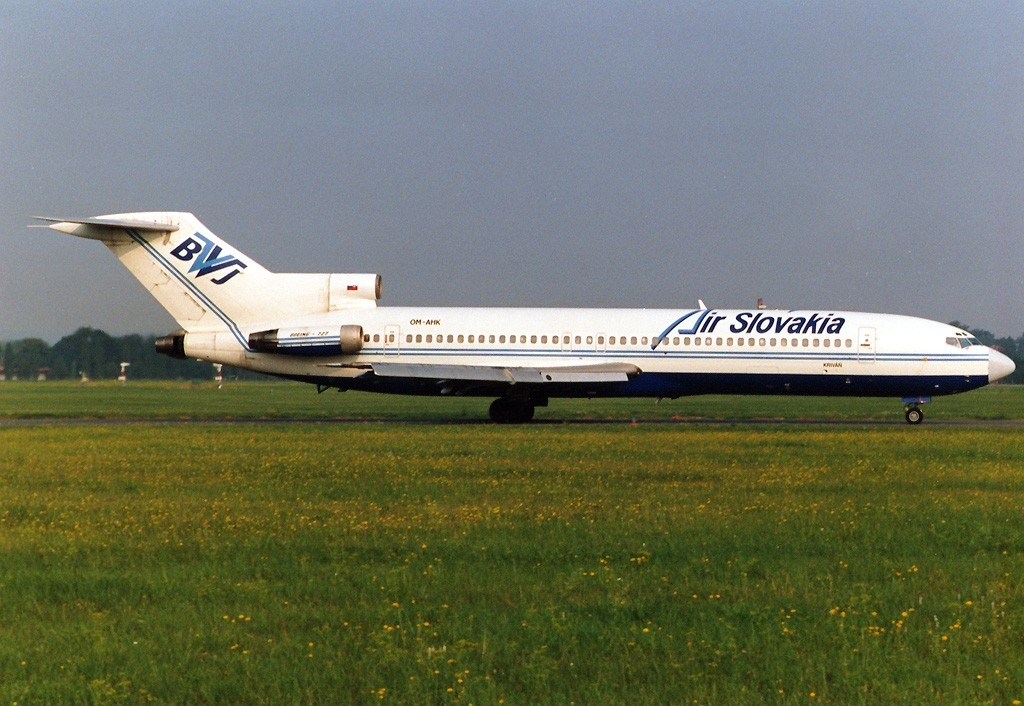
An Air Slovakia Boeing 727-200 taxiing at Ruzyně Airport, Prague, Czech Republic (1997)

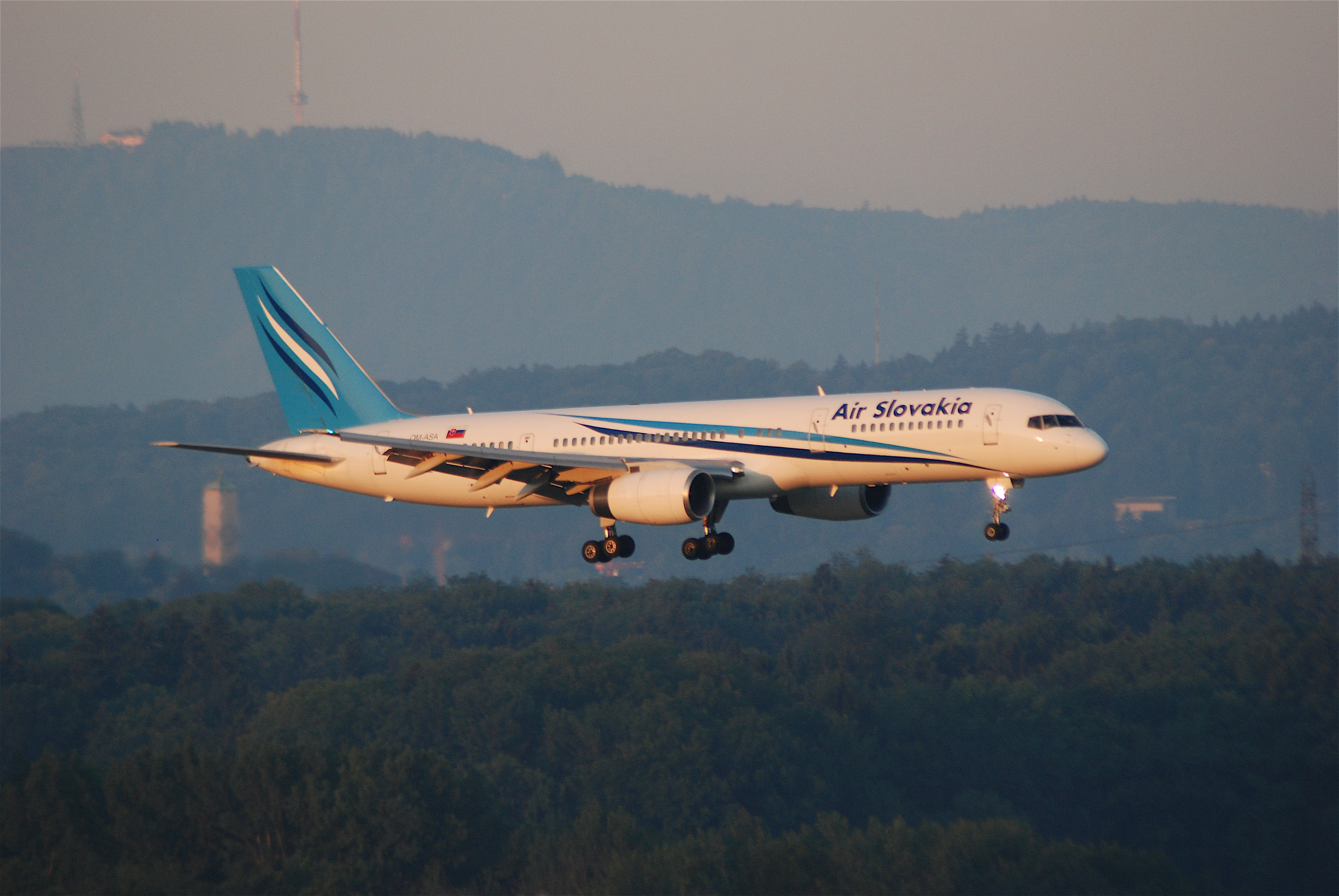
An Air Slovakia Boeing 757 landing at Zurich Airport, Switzerland (2007)

Over its time of existence, Air Slovakia operated an extensive network of charter flights, most of them to the Mediterranean region, but also to the Seychelles, Bangladesh, Sri Lanka and Thailand. Destinations that saw scheduled flights included Amritsar, Goa and New Delhi in India, as well as Beirut, Dubai, Kuwait and Tel Aviv. Air Slovakia once also offered some intra-European scheduled flights (to Barcelona, Birmingham, Cologne, Larnaca, London and Milan).

Upon closure, Air Slovakia served the following destinations:

=== Asia ===
- India
  - Amritsar - Raja Sansi International Airport
- Bangladesh
  - Dhaka - Shahjalal International Airport

=== Europe ===
- Italy
  - Bergamo - Orio al Serio Airport
- Slovakia
  - Bratislava - M. R. Štefánik Airport - base
- Spain
  - Barcelona - Barcelona El Prat Airport
- United Kingdom
  - Birmingham - Birmingham Airport

== Fleet ==
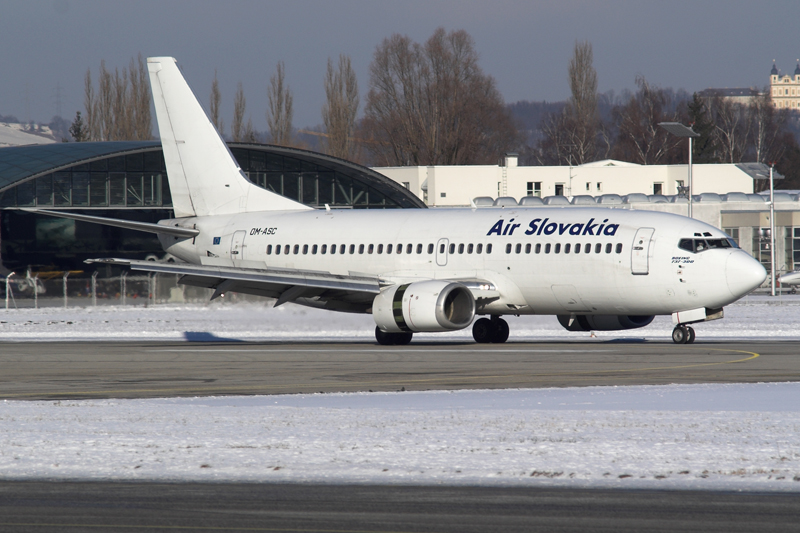
An Air Slovakia Boeing 737-300 landing at Salzburg Airport, Austria (2008)

=== Last fleet ===
Upon closure, the Air Slovakia fleet consisted of the following aircraft, equipped with an all-economy class seating:

Air Slovakia fleet
Aircraft	Total	Passengers
Boeing 737-200	1	unknown
Boeing 737-300	2; 1; 1	136; 145; 148
Boeing 757-200	1	229
Total	5	

=== Fleet development ===
The ageing Boeing 727 aircraft that formed the initial Air Slovakia fleet were replaced with Boeing 737-200 in 1999, and later again with the more modern Boeing 737-300 (from 2007) and Boeing 757-200 (from 2003).
