= Zlin Z-37 Čmelák =

Czechoslovak agricultural aircraft

Z-37 Čmelák
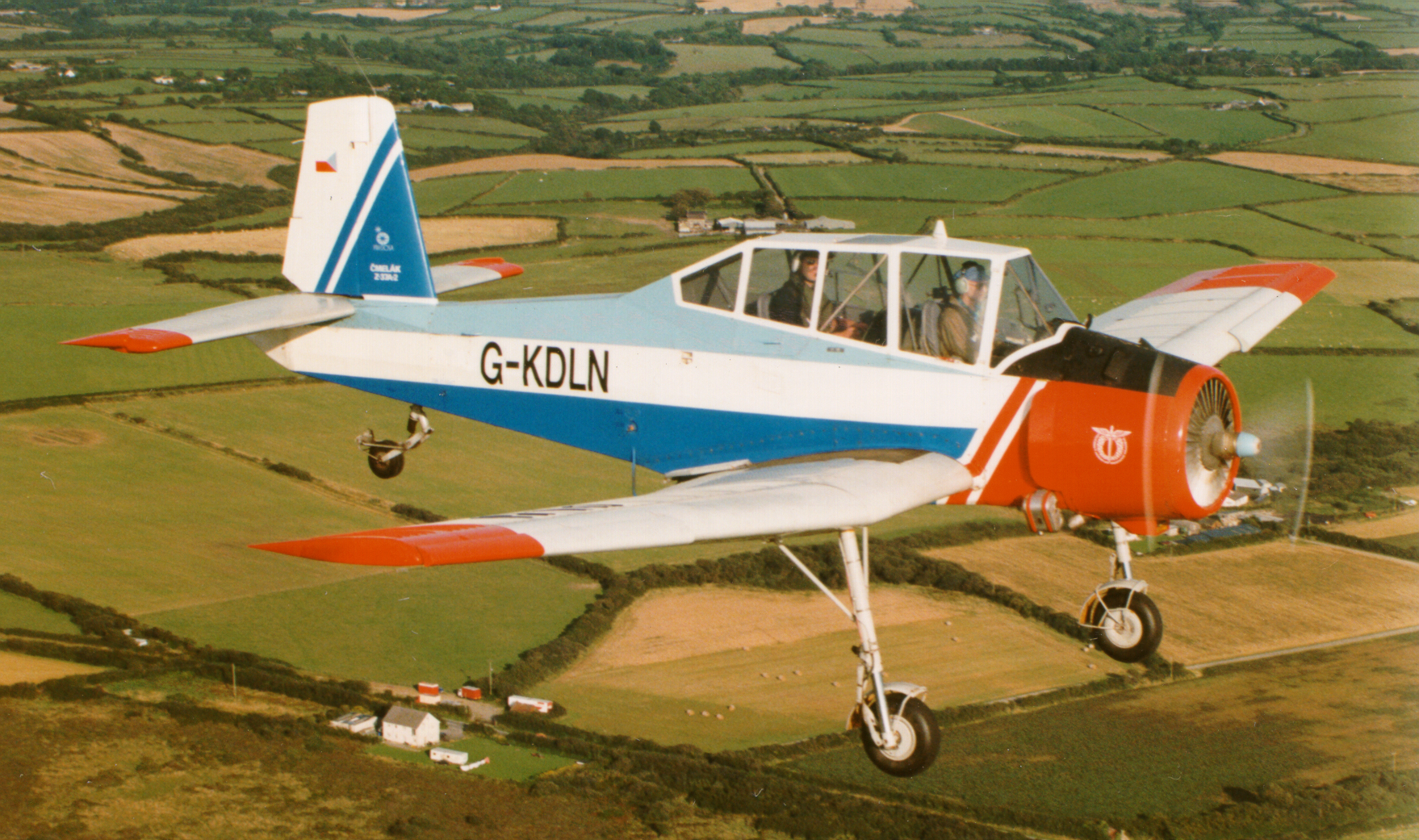
- UK-registered Z-37A-2

General information
- Type: Agricultural aircraft
- Manufacturer: Let, Moravan
- Status: In use
- Primary user: Czechoslovak civilian aviation
- Number built: ~713

History
- Manufactured: 1965–1987
- First flight: 29 June 1963

The Zlin Z-37 Čmelák (Czech: "Bumblebee"), also known as LET Z-37 Čmelák, is an agricultural aircraft which was manufactured in Czechoslovakia. It is powered by a Soviet-built Ivchenko reciprocating engine. The aircraft is used mainly as a cropduster.

== Design and development ==
Design work on a purpose-designed agricultural aircraft started in Czechoslovakia in 1961, with a cooperation of two manufacturers: Let Kunovice and Moravan (Zlin brand). The first prototype, designated as XZ-37, first flew on 29 March 1963 (other sources:29 June). It was a cantilever low-wing monoplane of tubular metal construction, the wings and stabilizers covered with duralumin and the fuselage and control surfaces made of fabric. It had a fixed undercarriage with a fully castoring tailwheel, but locked to the rudders for ground handling. The pilot's cockpit was in front, immediately behind a 315 hp radial engine, with a hopper for chemicals situated behind the cockpit. This offered the pilot a good view, but was potentially dangerous in case of an emergency landing. A mechanic could be seated behind the hopper, facing backwards. There were also spray booms mounted under the wings. There is also a freight version with open space instead of hopper and spray equipment and a -3 variant with three passenger seats facing rearwards.

The aircraft was produced from 1965 under the designation Z-37. From 1971, the Z-37A was produced, with a strengthened construction. It was produced until 1975, and then in 1983-1984. A total of 677 were produced, including 27 two-seater Z-37A-2s for crew training.

On 6 September 1981 the prototype XZ-37T first flew, powered by a (691 shp) Walter M-601B turboprop engine. Two further prototypes of the definitive turboprop version, the Z-37T Agro Turbo, powered by a less powerful M-601Z engine, flew on 12 July and 29 December 1983. As well as the new engine, it had longer-span wings (13.63 m) fitted with winglets.

The Z-37T was produced from 1985 until 1994, with a total of 51 aircraft built; including some Z-37T-2 two-seater trainers. Later production aircraft were redesignated Zlin Z-137T.

== Operational history ==
The main user of Z-37s was Czechoslovakia (now the Czech Republic and Slovakia) along with East Germany and other Eastern Bloc countries. Many were exported to the Sudan and India and flown there almost non-stop with the hopper used as extra fuel tank. Variants are as far afield as England and the United States. Current use is limited because of fuel costs and is now used mainly in Slovakia. Many are used for glider towing, having the ability to easily tow two gliders and often transport four gliders in tow for cross country.

A record has been set by a Z 137T in Slovakia, towing nine two-seat gliders.

In early August 2025, during the Russian invasion of Ukraine, a modified version of the Z-37T has appeared carrying a pair of R-73 air-to-air missiles. According to the Commander-in-Chief of the Armed Forces of Ukraine, General Oleksandr Syrskyi, the AFU is making use of light aircraft to intercept Shahed drones.

== Variants ==
XZ-37
First prototype.

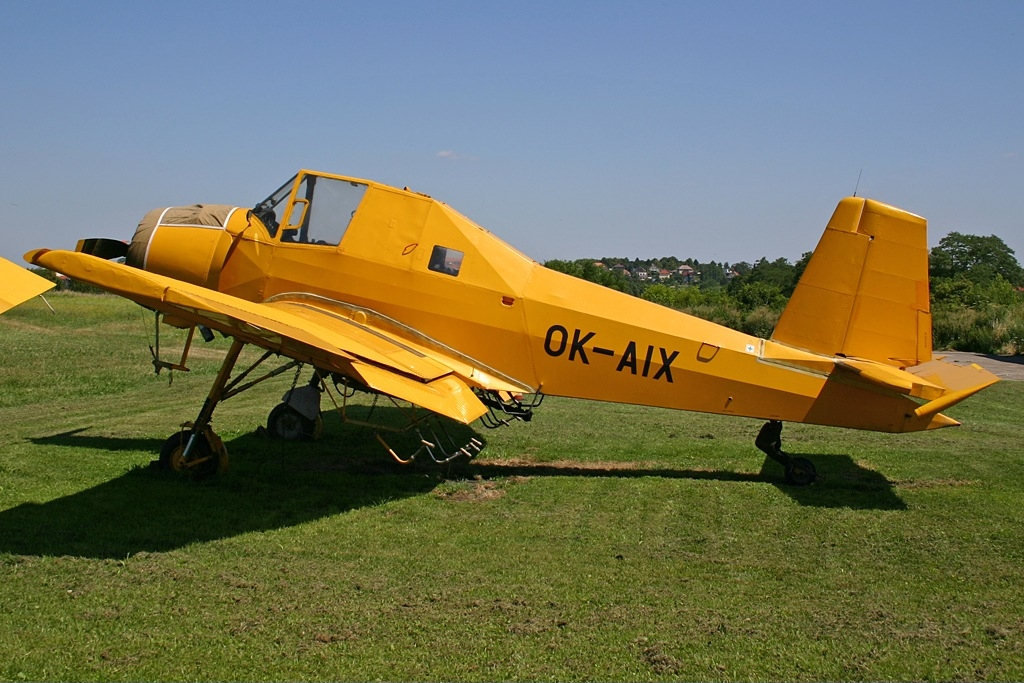
A Let Z-37A fitted with spray equipment

Z-37
First production version built between 1965 and 1971.

Z-37A
Second production version with strengthened construction. Built between 1971 and 1975 and later between 1983 and 1984, 650 built.

Z-37A-2
Two-seat version for crew training, 27 built.

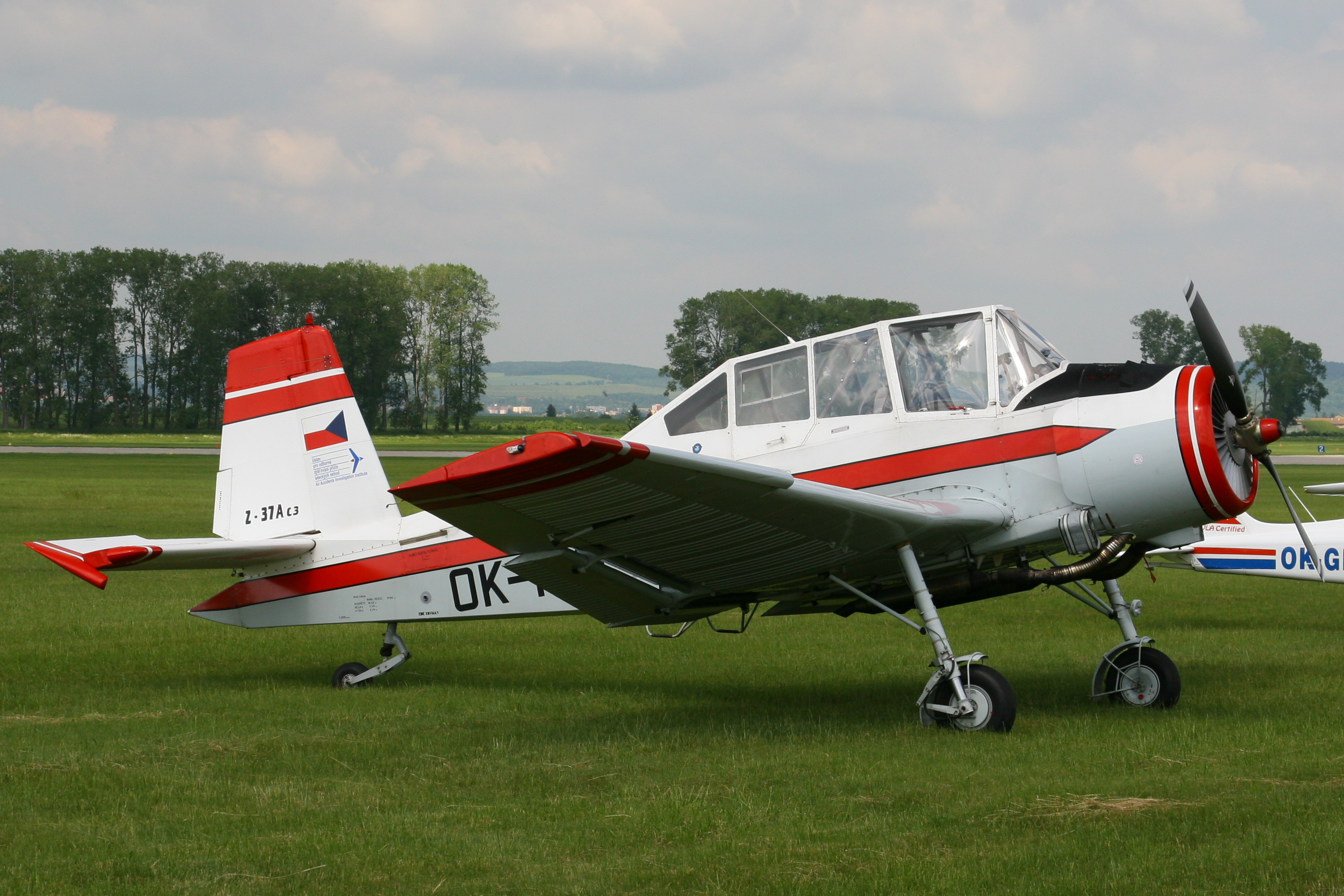
A Z-37A-3

Z-37A-3
Pilot plus three passenger version. Conversion of "A" version. Rear-facing seats.

XZ-37T
Prototype of the turboprop version powered by Walter M-601B engine, built in 1981.

Z-37T Agro Turbo
Turboprop version with bigger span wings, powered by Walter M-601Z engine and built between 1985 and 1987. 28 built including Z-37T-2 trainer.

Z-37T-2
Two-seat turboprop version for crew training built between 1985 and 1987.

Z-137T
Further development version.

== Operators ==
The Zlín Z-37 has been used extensively in former Eastern Bloc countries, including its country of manufacture Czechoslovakia (Slov-Air being a major operator), Bulgaria, East Germany and Hungary. It also saw service in Finland, India, Iraq and Yugoslavia.

In August 2025, at least one Z-137AT with Ukrainian Army Aviation markings and armed with a pair of R-73 air-to-air missiles was spotted, reportedly to intercept Russian drones.

== Aircraft on display ==
Bulgaria

- Zlin Z-37A LZ-3007 at the Aviation Museum in Plovdiv.

Czech Republic

- 06-15 – Let Z-37A DDR-SNK at the Letecké Muzeum Kunovice in Kunovice.
- 006 – Let Z-37TM OK-078 at the Letecké Muzeum Kunovice. A prototype of the turboprop version, originally militarised but later converted to civil use.

Estonia

- Zlin Z-37 at Estonian Aviation Museum

Germany

- 04-07 – Zlin Z-37A D-ESMU at the Technik Museum Sinsheim
- 08-18 – Let Z-37A D-ESOZ at the Deutsches Museum Flugwerft Schleissheim, Oberschleissheim, near Munich
- 14-20 – Zlin Z-37A D-ESLQ at Cottbus Air Base Museum.
- 20-06 – Zlin Z-37A DM-SVB at Cottbus Air Base Museum.

Latvia

- Zlin Z-37A - OK-ZKC at Riga Aviation Museum

New Zealand

- 010 – Let Z-37T Agro Turbo ZK-DOZ at the Ashburton Aviation Museum in Ashburton, Canterbury.

Serbia

- 08-19 – Let Z-37A YU-BGL at the Museum of Aviation in Belgrade.

== Specifications (Z-37A (agricultural version)) ==
Z-37 3-view drawing

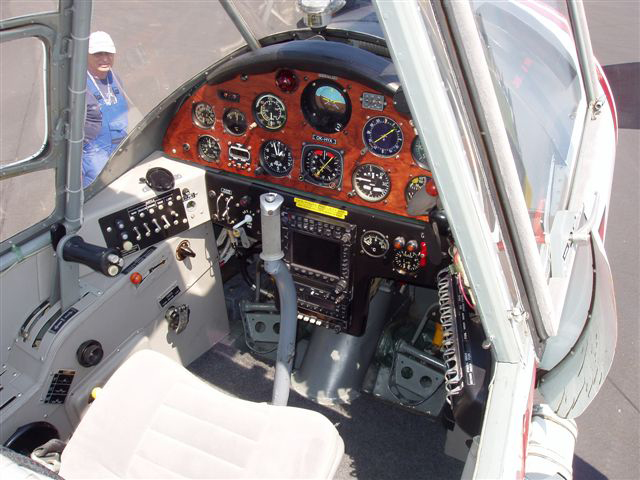
Z-37-3 cockpit

Data from Jane's All the World's Aircraft 1976-77.

General characteristics

- Crew: one, pilot
- Capacity: 1, mechanic (optional) / 650 L (170 US gal; 140 imp gal) or 600 kg (1,300 lb) of chemicals
- Length: 8.55 m (28 ft 1 in)
- Wingspan: 12.22 m (40 ft 1 in)
- Height: 2.9 m (9 ft 6 in)
- Wing area: 23.8 m^{2} (256 sq ft)
- Airfoil: root: NACA 33015; tip: NACA 44012A
- Empty weight: 1,043 kg (2,299 lb)
- Gross weight: 1,850 kg (4,079 lb)
- Max takeoff weight: 1,850 kg (4,079 lb)
- Fuel capacity: 125 L (33 US gal; 27 imp gal) in standard left hand centre-section tank, with optional 125 L (33 US gal; 27 imp gal) in right hand centre-section.

Provision for two externally carried fuel transport tanks of 125 L (33 US gal; 27 imp gal) each, for refuelling on site.

- Powerplant: 1 × Avia M462RF 9-cylinder air-cooled supercharged radial piston engine, 235 kW (315 hp)
- Propellers: 2-bladed Avia V 520 constant speed propeller

Performance

- Maximum speed: 210 km/h (130 mph, 110 kn)
- Cruise speed: 170 km/h (110 mph, 92 kn) at 1,500 m (4,900 ft)
- Operating speed: 120 km/h (75 mph; 65 kn)
- Stall speed: 90 km/h (56 mph, 49 kn) flaps up

81 km/h (50 mph; 44 kn) flaps down

- Never exceed speed: 270 km/h (170 mph, 150 kn)
- Rate of climb: 3.7 m/s (730 ft/min)
- Wing loading: 77.7 kg/m^{2} (15.9 lb/sq ft)
- Power/mass: 0.077 hp/lb (0.127 kW/kg)
- Minimum ground turning radius: 5.68 m (18.6 ft)
- Take-off run: 150 m (490 ft)
- Landing run: 122 m (400 ft)

== See also ==
Aircraft of comparable role, configuration, and era

- Embraer EMB 202 Ipanema
- CAC Ceres
- PZL-106 Kruk
- Rockwell Thrush Commander
