= Opera Jet =

Slovakian charter airline

IATA	ICAO	Call sign
-	OPJ	OPERA JET
- Founded: 2007
- Ceased operations: 2014
- Hubs: M. R. Štefánik Airport
- Fleet size: 4
- Headquarters: Bratislava, Slovakia
- Key people: Dr. Martin Hudec, Martin Sýkora
- Website: http://www.operajet.eu

Opera Jet a.s. was a private jet operator based in Bratislava, Slovakia. The company provided executive charter services, as well as aircraft management, brokerage, and pilot training. Its main base was M. R. Štefánik Airport, Bratislava, Slovakia.

== History ==
Opera Jet was formed in 2007.

Opera Jet ceased operations in November 2014.

== Fleet ==
The Opera Jet fleet includes the following aircraft (last update April 2014):

- 1 × Cessna Citation CJ2
- 2 × Cessna Citation CJ3
- 1 × Beechcraft Raytheon Premier 1A
