= Aero Slovakia =

Aviation company based in Slovakia

| IATA | ICAO | Call sign |
|---|---|---|
| - | ASO | AEROSLOVAKIA |
- Founded: 1992
- Headquarters: Nitra Airport; Nitra, Slovakia
- Website: http://www.aeroslovakia.sk/

Aero Slovakia is an aviation company based in Slovakia offering a range of aviation services, including aerial works in agriculture & forestry, patrolling & monitoring, photography and air taxi operations. The company has its head office on the grounds of LZNI, Nitra.

== Aircraft maintenance ==
Company is the holder of permit SK.CAO.008 (Combined Airworthiness Organization), on the basis of which it provides service and maintenance, as well as monitoring and maintaining the airworthiness of the following types of aircraft:

- Cessna 100 / 200 series,
- Zlin Z37
- Zlin 37T

== Fleet ==
The airline's fleet comprises that aircraft:

- Cessna 150
- Cessna 152
- Cessna 172
- Zlín Z37A "Čmelák"
- Zlín Z137 Turbo

== Flying school ==
Company provides pilot training in its own aviation school SK.DTO.07.

Training types

- LAPL(A) SEP-land
- PPL(A) SEP-land
- Training course to obtain the SEP-land class qualification category
- Training course for obtaining a qualification category for VFR night flights - airplane
