= Smartwings Slovakia =

Charter airline of Slovakia

IATA	ICAO	Call sign
6D	TVQ	SLOVAKTRAVEL
- Founded: 2010; 16 years ago
- Operating bases: Bratislava; Košice
- Fleet size: 1
- Destinations: 27
- Parent company: Smartwings
- Headquarters: Bratislava, Slovakia
- Website: www.smartwings.com/sk/

Smartwings Slovakia, formerly Travel Service Slovakia, is a charter airline based in Bratislava, Slovakia. The company was founded in 2010 and operates from Bratislava Airport. It is a subsidiary of Smartwings (formerly named Travel Service) from the Czech Republic. In December 2018, it adopted its new brand name.

== Fleet ==
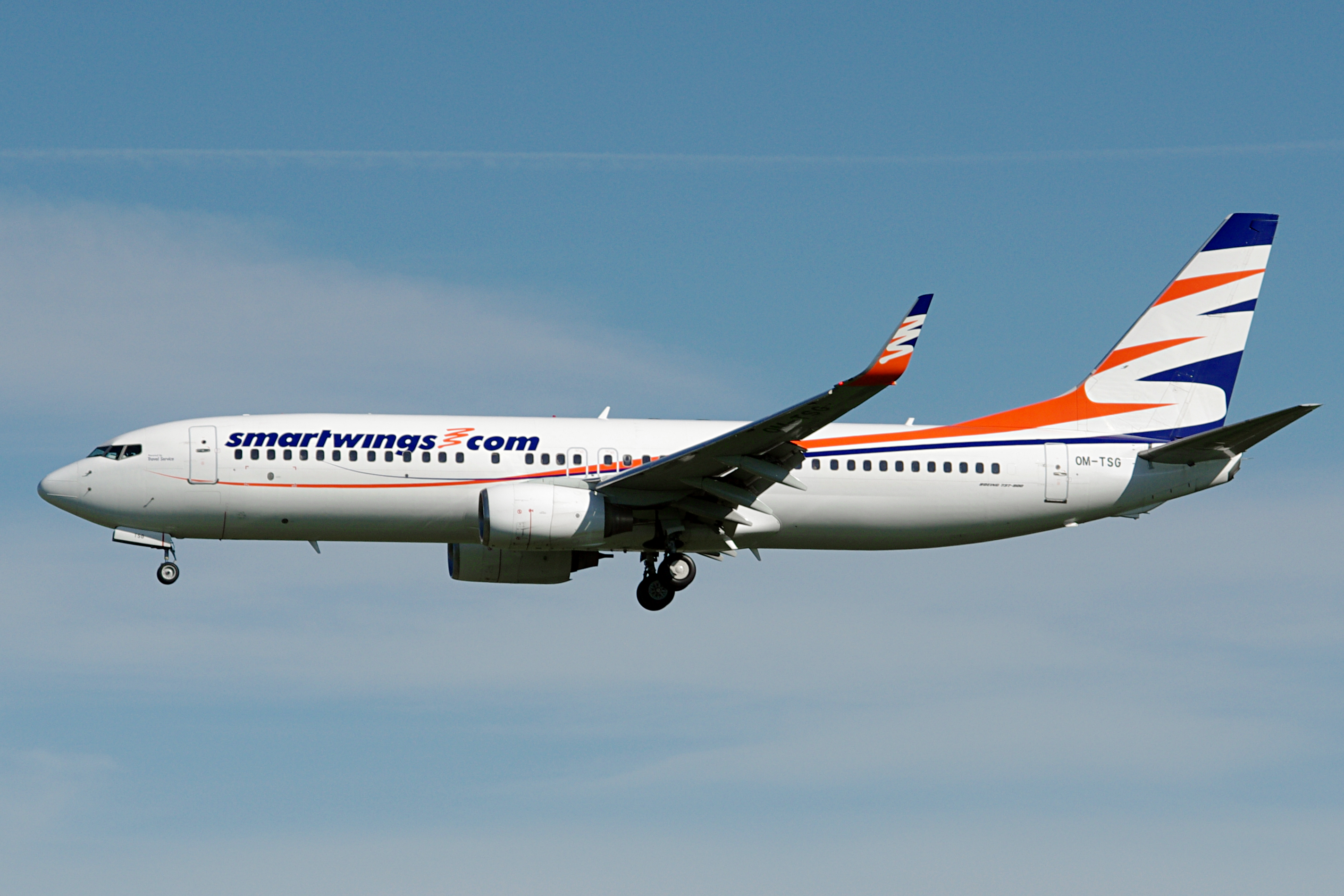
Smartwings Slovakia Boeing 737-800

=== Current fleet ===
As of August 2025, Smartwings Slovakia operates the following aircraft:

Smartwings Slovakia fleet
Aircraft	In service	Orders	Passengers			Notes
Aircraft	In service	Orders	C	Y	Total	Notes
Boeing 737-800	1	—	–	189	189	OM-TSG
Total	1	—				

=== Former aircraft ===
- Airbus A320-200
