= Bratislava Airport =

Main international airport in Slovakia

M. R. Štefánik Airport Bratislava Airport Letisko M. R. Štefánika Letisko Bratislava

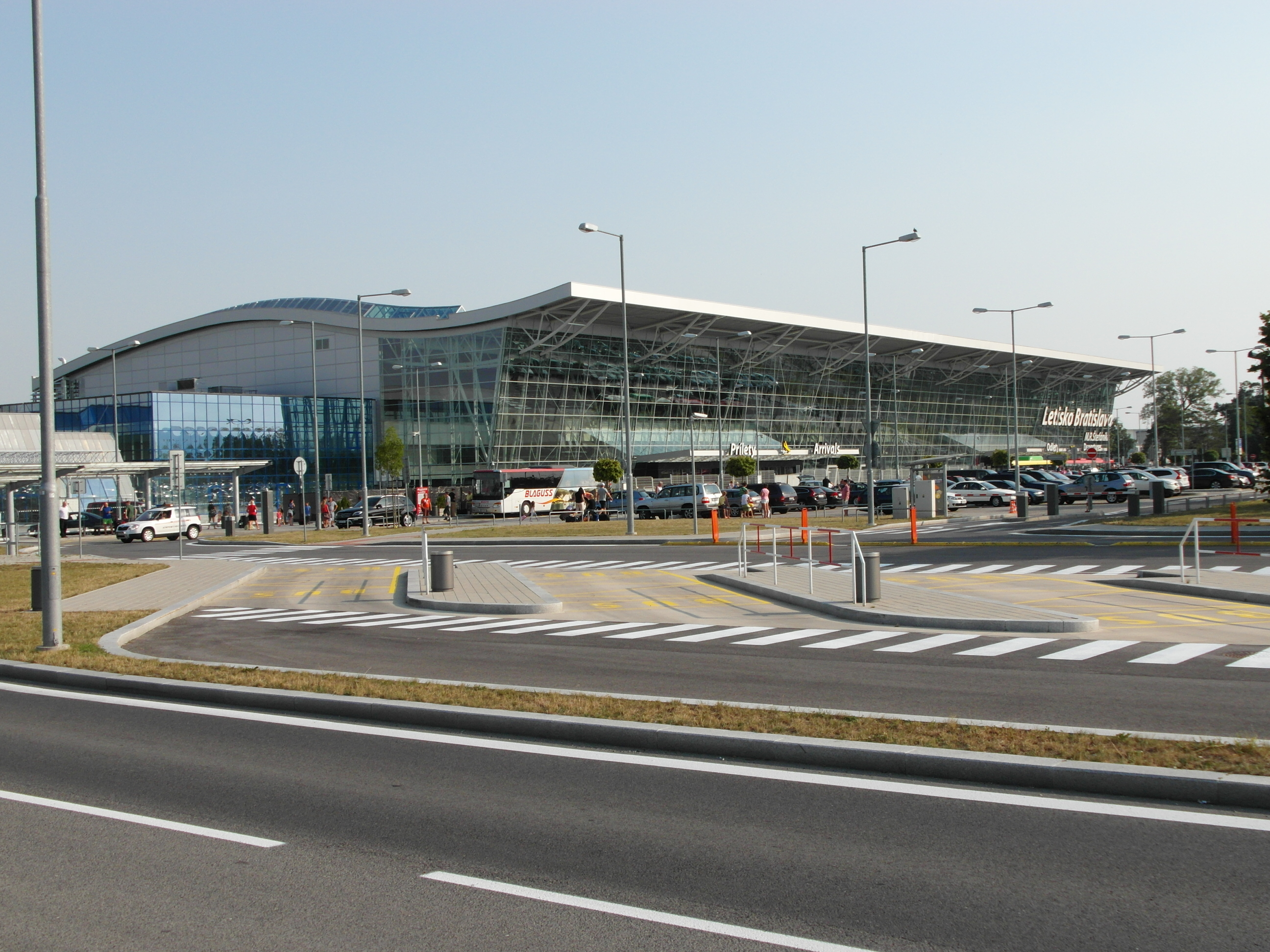
- IATA: BTS; ICAO: LZIB

Summary
- Airport type: Public
- Operator: Airport Bratislava, a.s. (BTS)
- Serves: Bratislava, Slovakia and Vienna, Austria
- Location: Bratislava/Ivanka pri Dunaji
- Opened: 1951; 75 years ago
- Hub for: Slovak Government Flying Service
- Operating base for: Air Horizont; Ryanair; Smartwings Slovakia; Wizz Air
- Elevation AMSL: 436 ft (133 m)
- Coordinates: 48°10′12″N 17°12′46″E
- Website: www.bts.aero

Map
- Location of the airport in Slovakia

Runways
| Direction | Length | | Surface |
| Direction | m | ft | Surface |
|---|---|---|---|
| 04/22 | 2,900 | 9,515 | Concrete |
| 13/31 | 3,190 | 10,466 | Concrete |

Statistics (2025)
- Passengers: 2,438,215 ▲25%
- Movements: 29,002 ▲3.6%
- Cargo: 18,929 ▲70%
- Source: Bratislava Airport press release

M. R. Štefánik Airport (IATA: BTS, ICAO: LZIB), also called Bratislava Airport, is the main international airport of Slovakia. It is located about 9 km (5 1/2 mi) northeast of the city center of Bratislava, spanning over the area of three municipalities (Bratislava-Ružinov, Bratislava-Vrakuňa, and Ivanka pri Dunaji).

Originally known as Bratislava-Ivanka Airport, shortly after the independence of Slovakia in 1993, it was renamed after General Milan Rastislav Štefánik (1880–1919), whose aircraft crashed near Bratislava in 1919. The airport is owned and run by Letisko M. R. Štefánika – Airport Bratislava, a.s. (BTS). As of September 2014, the company is fully owned by the Slovak Republic via the Ministry of Transport, Construction and Regional Development.

Bratislava airport is a base for the Slovak Government Flying Service, as well as Ryanair, AirExplore, Smartwings Slovakia, Wizz Air, and Air Horizont during the summer season. During a brief period in 2011, the airport was also a secondary hub for Czech Airlines, and between 2004 and 2005, it was secondary hub for Austrian Airlines. Two maintenance companies, Austrian Technik Bratislava and East Air Company are also based at the airport. Air Livery has one painting bay for aircraft at the airport. The airport is category 4E for aircraft, and category 7 or 8 on request in terms of potential rescue.

The airport is located to the north-east of the city center, with direct access from the D1 motorway, covering a catchment area of four countries, and is a one-hour drive from Vienna International Airport located 49 kilometres (30 1/2 mi) west of the city centre. Conversely, Bratislava Airport serves as a low-cost alternative for Vienna and the neighbouring areas.

== History ==
=== Early years ===
The first regular flight between Prague and Bratislava started in 1923, by the newly formed carrier Czechoslovak Airlines. At that time the airport for Bratislava was in Vajnory, about 3 km (2 mi) away from the current airport. That airport is now closed.

Preparation for the current airport started in 1947 and construction began in 1948. Two runways were constructed (04/22, 1,900 m (6,200 ft) and 13/31, 1,500 m (4,900 ft)) and the airport, known as Bratislava‑Ivanka, opened in 1951.

=== Development since the 1990s ===
In January 2019, the only domestic route of Slovakia between Bratislava and Košice, and the Prague–Bratislava route were axed by Czech Airlines.

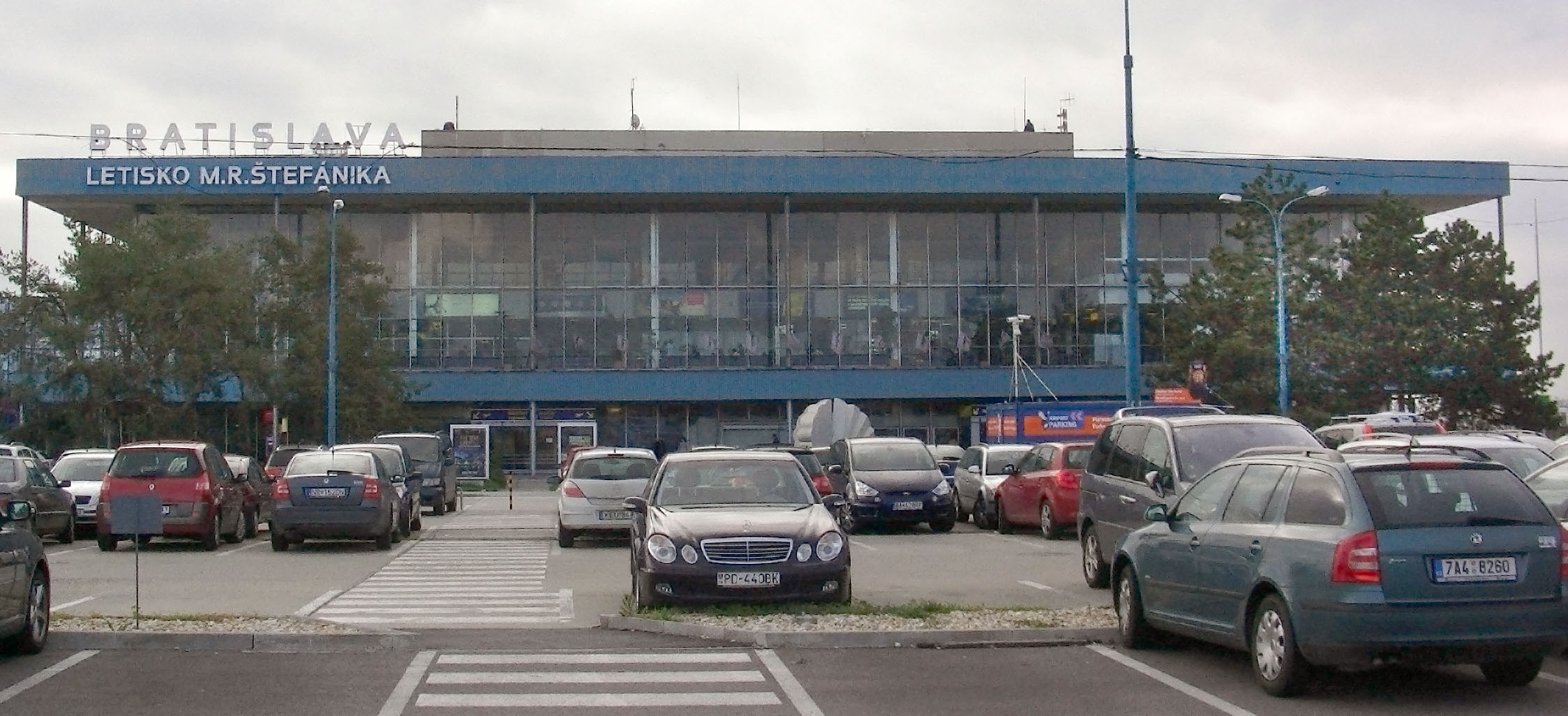
Bratislava Airport before reconstruction in 2008

== Facilities ==
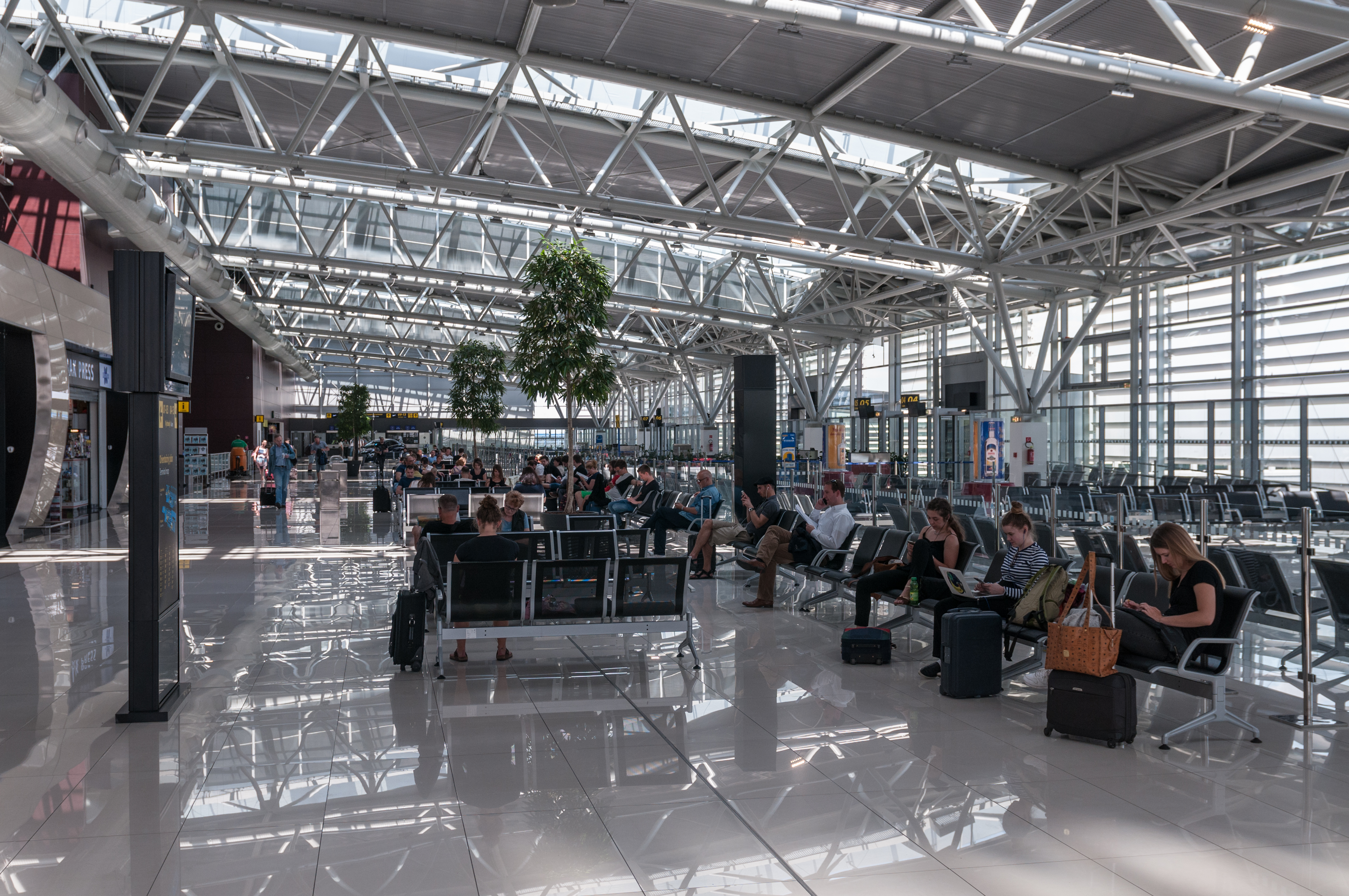
Departures area

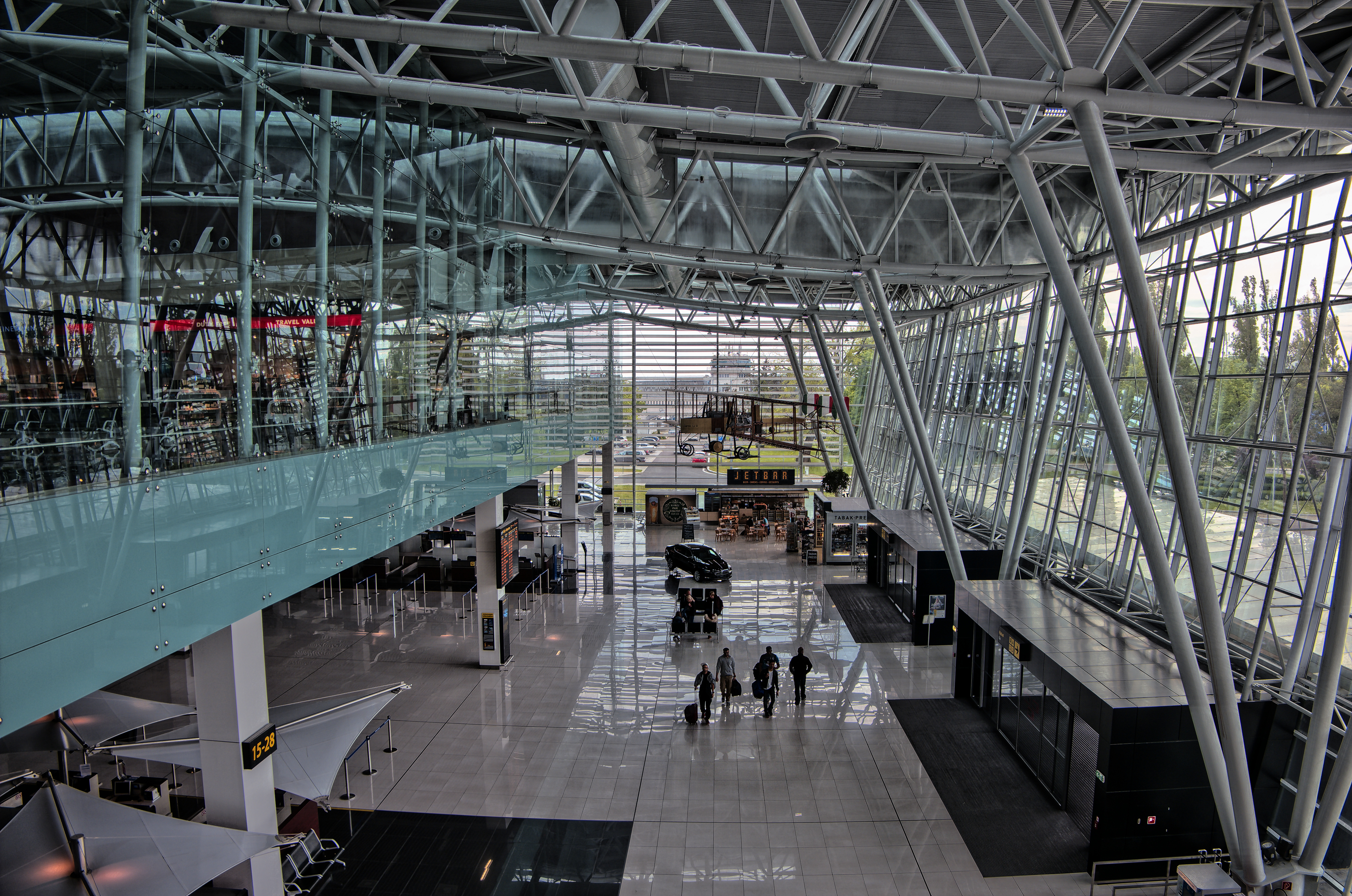
Check-in hall

=== Terminals ===
The airport has one terminal serving arrivals and departures, completed in July 2012.

The current terminal includes 29 check-in desks located on the ground floor of the departures terminal, one of them designated for oversized baggage. In the non-public zones of the waiting area targeted at departing passengers, there are 13 gates, eight in the Schengen and five in the non-Schengen area.

The airport is also home to the General Aviation Terminal (GAT), where passengers on private, business and VIP flights are handled, as well as passengers of emergency flights and crew.

=== Other facilities ===
A new control tower was added in the 1990s. The parking lot near the terminal has 970 parking spots and is used for short- and long-term parking. The current capacity of the airport is over 5 million passengers per year. The offices of the Slovak Civil Aviation Authority are on the airport property.

=== Runways ===
The current runways enable the landing of virtually all types of aircraft used in the world today (except for Airbus A380, Boeing 747-8 or another aircraft of similar size). The airport features two perpendicular runways (04/22 and 13/31), both of which underwent a complete reconstruction in the 1980s. Runway 13/31 is equipped for the ICAO category IIIA approach and landing, while 04/22 is category I. Runway 04/22 is 2,900 metres (9,514 ft) long and 60 metres (197 ft) wide. Runway 13/31 is 3,190 metres (10,466 ft) long and 45 metres (148 ft) wide.

== Airlines and destinations ==
The following airlines operate regular scheduled, seasonal, and seasonal charter flights to and from Bratislava:

| Airlines | Destinations |
|---|---|
| Air Cairo | Hurghada, Seasonal charter: El Alamein |
| Air Montenegro | Seasonal: Podgorica |
| Pegasus Airlines | Istanbul–Sabiha Gökçen; Seasonal: Antalya |
| Ryanair | Agadir, Alicante, Athens, Barcelona, Bari, Brussels-Charleroi, Dublin, Edinburgh, Eindhoven, Lamezia Terme, Lanzarote, London–Stansted, Malaga, Malta, Manchester, Milan–Malpensa, Naples, Palermo, Paphos, Pisa, Rome–Ciampino, Tirana, Thessaloniki, Trapani, Turin, Warsaw–Modlin; Seasonal: Alghero, Burgas, Corfu, Gdańsk, Chania (begins 28 March 2027), Girona (begins 1 June 2027), Leeds/Bradford, Palma de Mallorca, Skiathos, Zadar, Zaragoza (begins April 2027) |
| Smartwings | Seasonal: Burgas, Corfu, Heraklion, Larnaca, Palma de Mallorca, Rhodes, Zakynthos; Seasonal charter: Antalya, Athens, Bahrain, Boa Vista, Cairo–Capital, Doha, El Alamein, Ibiza, Košice, Monastir Porto, Prague, |
| SunExpress | Seasonal: Antalya |
| TUI Airways | Seasonal charter: Phu Quoc, La Romana |
| Wizz Air | Agadir, Alicante, Athens, Baku, Barcelona, Basel/Mulhouse, Berlin, Hurghada, Chișinău, Košice, Kutaisi, Larnaca, London–Luton, Malaga, Naples, Oslo, Palermo, Pristina, Rome–Fiumicino, Sarajevo (begins 3 December 2026), Skopje, Tel Aviv, Tirana, Tuzla (ends 9 January 2027), Varna, Warsaw–Chopin Yerevan; Seasonal: Lamezia Terme, Nice, Ohrid Podgorica, |

== Statistics ==
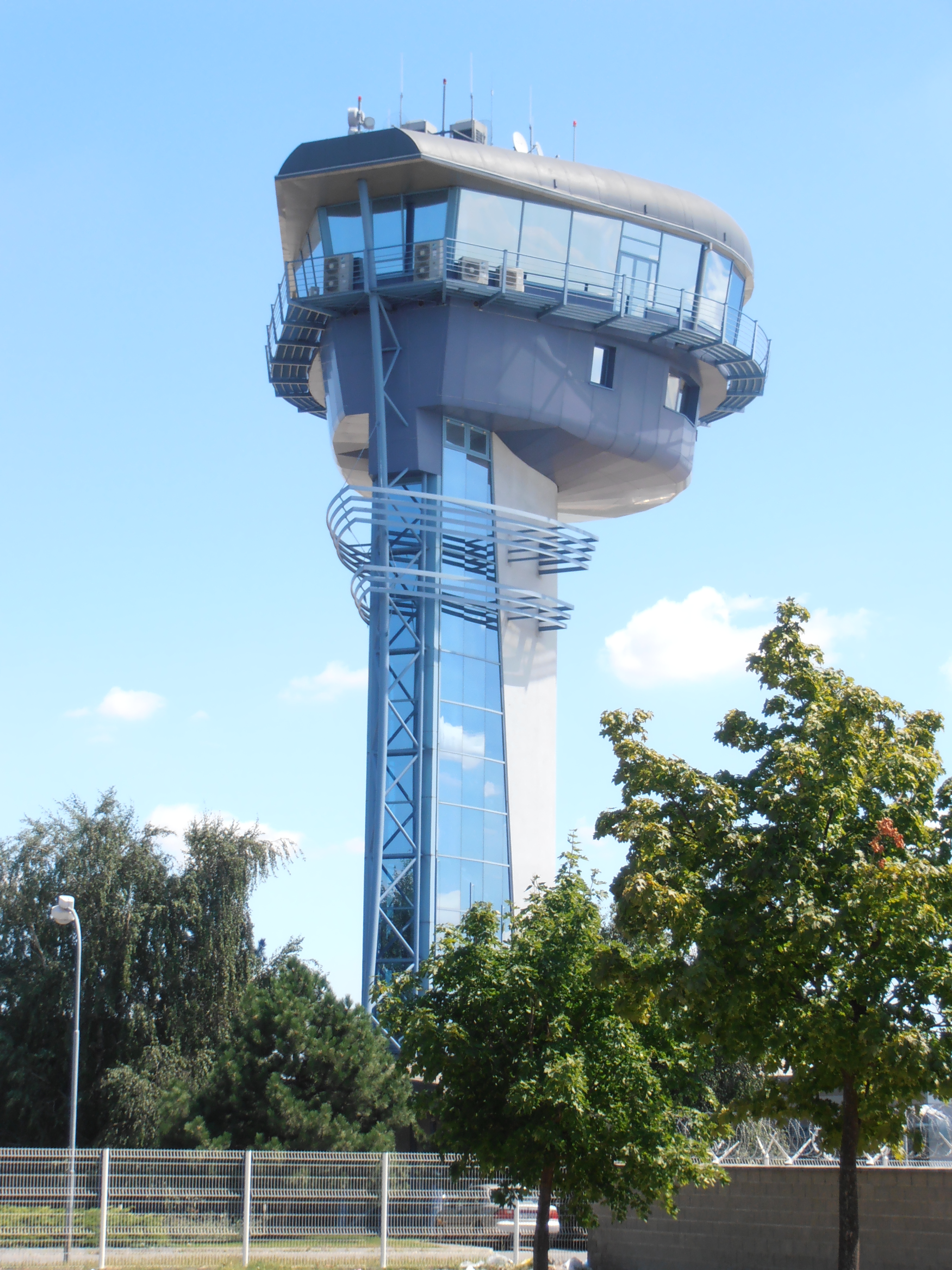
Control tower

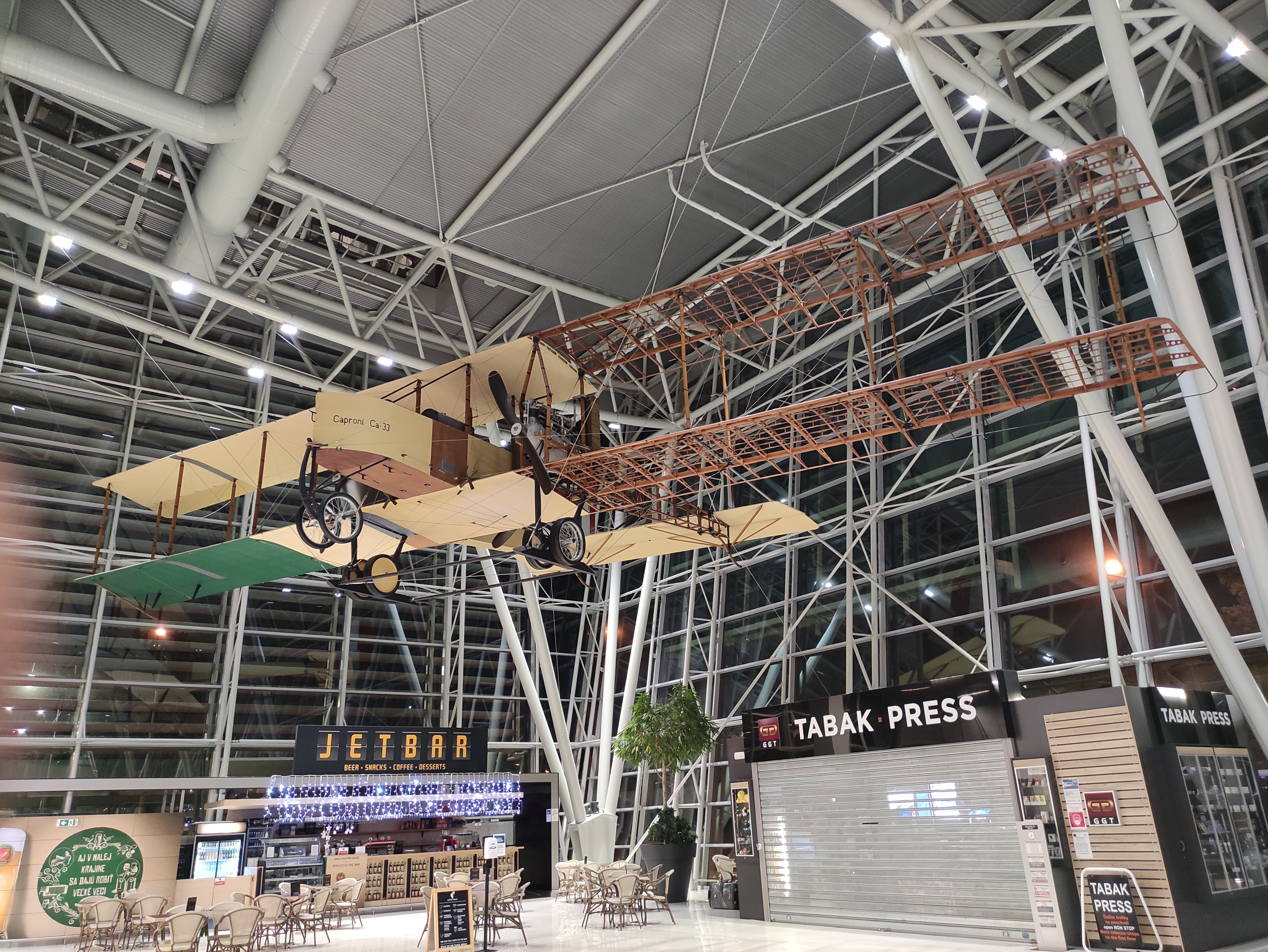
Caproni Ca.33 in the departure hall

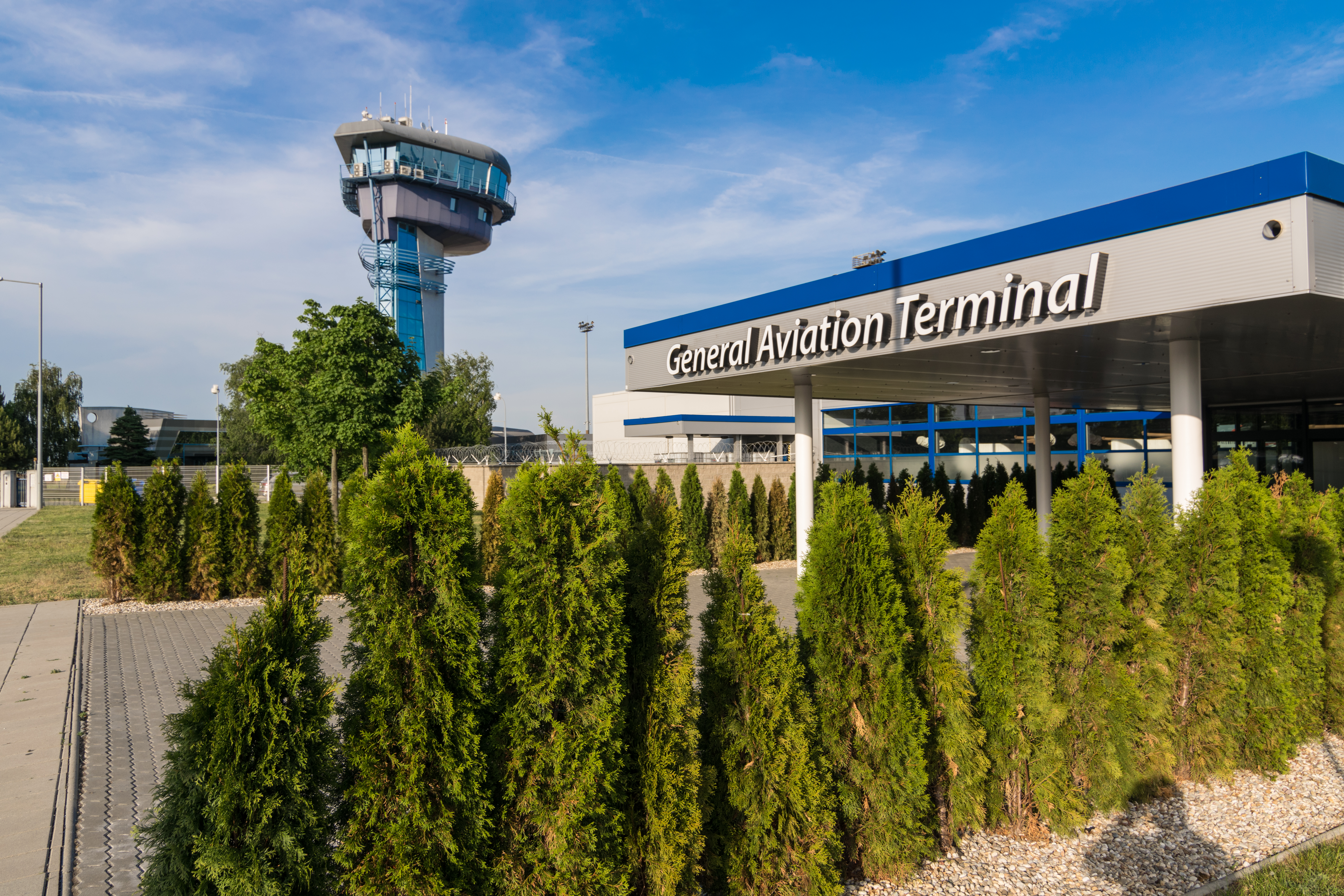
General Aviation Terminal

| Year | Passengers | Change | Cargo (tonnes) |
|---|---|---|---|
| 2016 | 1,756,808 | ▲12.3% | 22,895 |
| 2017 | 1,942,069 | ▲10.6% | 26,246 |
| 2018 | 2,292,712 | ▲18.1% | 24,458 |
| 2019 | 2,290,242 | ▼0.1% | 20,449 |
| 2020 | 405,097 | ▼82.3% | 24,739 |
| 2021 | 480,152 | ▲18.5% | 19,623 |
| 2022 | 1,406,284 | ▲192.9% | 18,042 |
| 2023 | 1,813,660 | ▲28.4% | 11,082 |
| 2024 | 1,948,008 | ▲7.4% | 11,136 |
| 2025 | 2,438,215 | ▲25.16% | 18,929 |
| 1-10/2026 | 4,082,799 | ▲ +99% | 19 029 |

=== Busiest routes ===
Top ten busiest routes from Bratislava in 2024
| Rank | Airport | Passengers | Airlines |
|---|---|---|---|
| 1 | Antalya | 214,944 | Corendon Airlines, Pegasus Airlines, Smartwings |
| 2 | London Stansted | 111,800 | Ryanair |
| 3 | London Luton | 95,793 | Wizz Air |
| 4 | Bergamo | 89,944 | Ryanair |
| 5 | Hurghada | 79,184 | Air Cairo, Corendon Airlines |
| 6 | Skopje | 66,101 | Wizz Air |
| 7 | Dublin | 63,585 | Ryanair |
| 8 | Larnaca | 62,871 | Smartwings |
| 9 | Malta | 61,557 | Ryanair |
| 10 | Manchester | 56,841 | Ryanair |

== Ground transportation ==
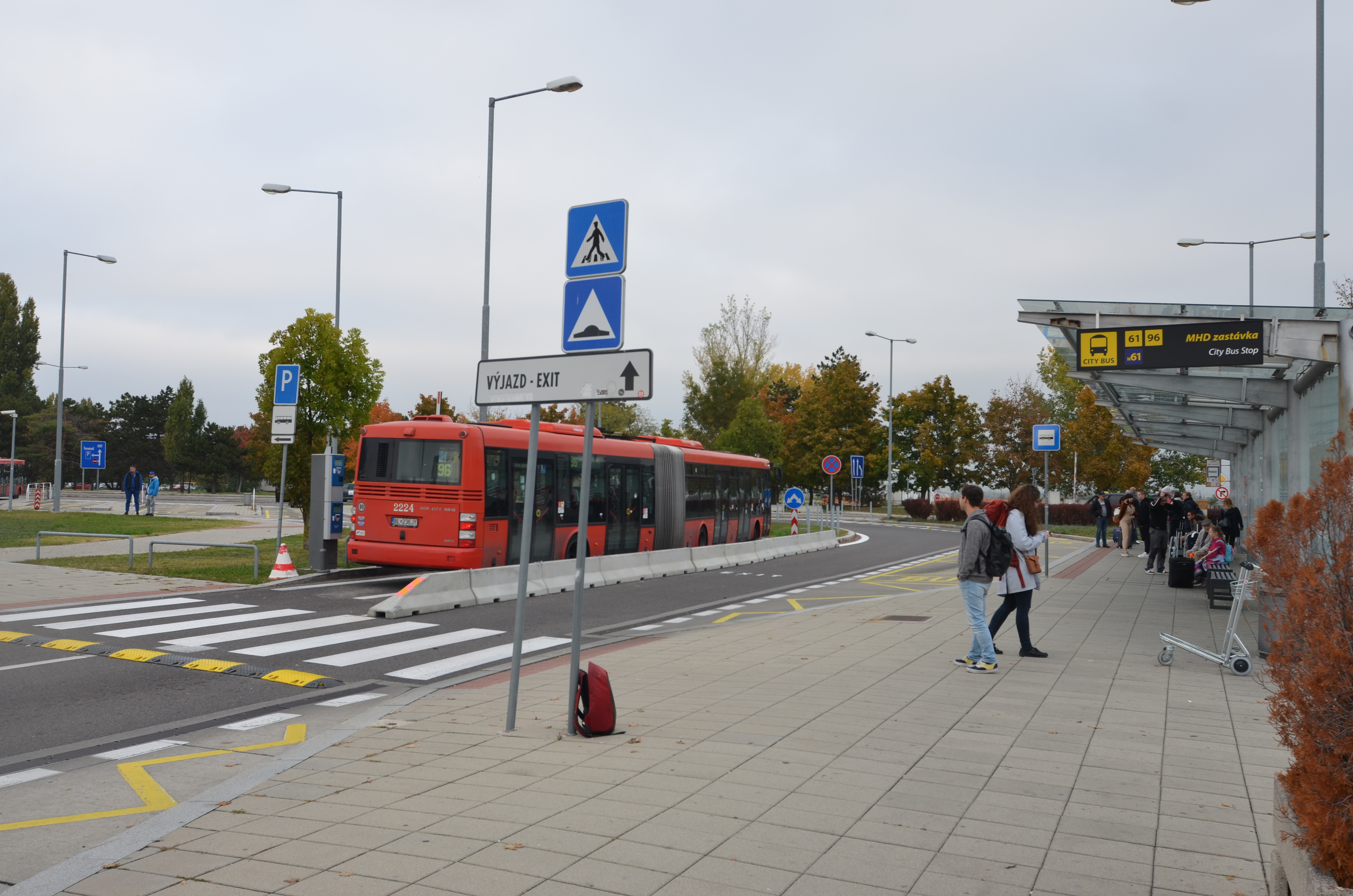
Bratislava Airport bus stop terminal

=== Buses and coaches ===
- Bratislava – Public transport trolleybus No. 61 connects the airport to the city centre and the central railway station during the day. At night the airport is served by bus N61 from the central railway station.
- Vienna – FlixBus and Slovak Lines (jointly with Postbus) operate bus lines to Vienna which stop also at the Vienna International Airport.

=== Roads ===
Bratislava Airport can be reached by private car from the city centre, which is nine kilometres (5 1/2 miles) away, or directly from D1 motorway. There is also a taxi stand just near the entrance to the airport with Taxi Slovakia company (taxi of other companies can be called by telephone but rates for the airport are usually higher). Long-term and short-term car parking is provided at the airport, in front of the terminal building.

== Accidents and incidents ==
- On 4 May 1919, a Caproni Ca.33, flying from Udine, Italy, to Bratislava, carrying four occupants consisting of a three-member crew and passenger Milan Rastislav Štefánik, crashed on approach to the airport, killing all four occupants.
- On 24 November 1966, an Il-18 on multi-leg TABSO Flight 101 from Sofia to East Berlin via Budapest and Prague crashed into the forested foothills of the Little Carpathians west of the airport, shortly after take-off from Bratislava Airport, where it had been grounded due to bad weather in Prague. All 74 passengers and eight crew members died.
- On 28 July 1976, an Il-18 on ČSA Flight 001 from Prague crashed into the Zlaté Piesky lake just north-west of the airport after landing. 76 of the 79 occupants on board died in the crash.
- On 7 February 1999, a Ghanaian Boeing 707-328C cargo aircraft crashed after aborting its takeoff and subsequently overran 100–200 metres (330–660 ft) beyond the runway. During takeoff, the number two and three engines experienced technical issues, and in response, the pilots decided to abort the takeoff. However, despite the pilots' attempts to slow the aircraft down, the aircraft overran the runway, damaging two traffic lights before coming to a stop in wet soil. All four crew were uninjured, with the aircraft only suffering minor damages, including cracks to the fuselage and damage to its landing gear.
- On 6 June 1999, during the SIAD '99 air show, a BAE Hawk 200 fighter jet piloted by Graham Wardell crashed into a concrete parking landing area while performing a barrel roll. Its remains flew over and landed behind the biological protection building of the airport. The pilot and a 35-year-old spectator on the roof of a building were killed. An additional 15 people were injured on the ground.
- On 16 November 2012, an Air Contractors Airbus A300B4-203 (EI-EAC) operating for DHL veered the runway on landing after a loss of control of the nose-gear steering. The aircraft struck a concrete inspection pit, causing the nose-gear to collapse, before coming to rest. All 3 crew members were evacuated. The aircraft suffered substantial damage, and was transferred to Bratislava Airport for training use; however, these plans were never realised and the aircraft was scrapped in 2020.
