= 1977 Prague Ruzyně Airport collision =

1977 aviation accident in Czechoslovakia

1977 Prague Ruzyně Airport collision ČSA Flight 897 · ČSA OK-NAA
- The Il-18 in the aftermath of the collision

Accident
- Date: 2 January 1977
- Summary: Runway collision due to ATC error and bad weather
- Site: Prague Ruzyně International Airport, Prague, Czechoslovakia
- Total fatalities: 0
- Total survivors: 64

First aircraft
- OK-CFD, the Tupolev Tu-134A involved in the collision, photographed in 1975.
- Type: Tupolev Tu-134A
- Operator: ČSA (Československé Státní Aerolinie)
- Registration: OK-CFD
- Flight origin: Pulkovo Airport, Leningrad Russian SFSR, Soviet Union
- Destination: Prague Ruzyně International Airport, Prague, Czechoslovakia
- Occupants: 49
- Passengers: 43
- Crew: 6
- Fatalities: 0
- Survivors: 49

Second aircraft
- OK-NAA, the Ilyushin Il-18V involved in the collision, photographed in 2012
- Type: Ilyushin Il-18V
- Operator: ČSA (Československé Státní Aerolinie)
- Registration: OK-NAA
- Flight origin: Prague Ruzyně International Airport, Prague, Czechoslovakia
- Destination: Bratislava Airport, Bratislava, Czechoslovakia
- Occupants: 15
- Passengers: 9
- Crew: 6
- Fatalities: 0
- Survivors: 15

On 2 January 1977, ČSA Flight 897, a Tupolev Tu-134A, collided with a ČSA's Ilyushin Il-18V on the runway at Prague Ruzyně International Airport. All 49 on board the Tu-134A and 15 on board the Il-18V survived, but the Tu-134A was written off while the Il-18V was still operable.

1977 was considered to be the last year for ČSA to have any serious accidents, following this accident and ČSA Flight 475

== Accident ==
The weather at Prague Ruzyně International Airport was cloudy and foggy. The crew members of the Tu-134A reported: "Praha věž, linka 897. Dobrý večer, usazeni v ajlesu na finále." ("Prague Tower, line 897. Good evening, seated in the aisle for the final."); they were cleared to land at runway 31 - equipped with instrument landing system. Meanwhile, an Il-18V was on the runway, preparing for takeoff. Due to fog, the crew were unable to see the aircraft until seconds before touchdown. As the crew member realized the existence of the Il-18V on the runway they were going to land, the captain pushed the throttles while the co-pilot pulled back the controls. The plane did not react in time, and its right wing clipped through the Il-18's tail.

Part of the wing and the deployed flap was ruptured, banking the plane to the right. Though the crew tried to stabilize the plane, the right wing struck the ground first, then the landing gear, nose, and the left wing respectively. The plane stopped at the end of the runway.

For fear of a fire in the rear section, the crew shut down the electrical system. As a result, they also turned off the radio, which prevent them from informing the controller about the accident. The rescuers first reached the Il-18 after the crew members reported to have its tail broken. They were unaware that the Tu-134 also crashed, so when some of the passengers that had escaped the aircraft and went to the security buildings for help, the security guards prohibited them from getting in in disbelief of surviving a plane crash. Only 20 minutes had passed did the rescue services arrive at the plane and another 20 minutes for the medical services.

== Investigation ==
The investigation was conducted by the StB. It was concluded that the plane crash was cause by the air traffic controller error, specifically the shift change between the day and night controllers. The day controller had granted permission for the Il-18 to taxi to Runway 25; however, the runway was too icy, so the Il-18 diverted to the Runway 31 with clearance. The divert, however, was not been properly noted to the night controller. When Flight 897 request for landing, it was approved, the same moment when they cleared the Il-18 to entered the runway, leading to the collision.

== Aftermath ==
=== OK-NAA ===
The Il-18 was only substantially damaged and was repaired. It then continued to fly until 1981, when it was withdrawn and placed at Kbely Aviation Museum.

=== In popular culture ===
The accident was adapted to the 92nd episode of a 2001 television series "Osudové okamžiky" on November 28, 2002
