= Měšice Castle =

Coordinates: 50°11′45″N 14°31′20″E

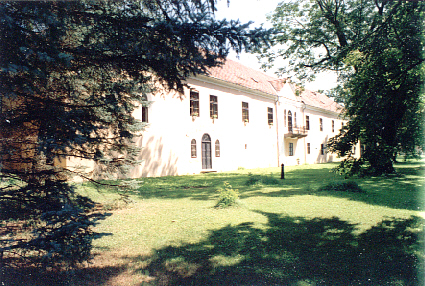
Měšice Castle

Měšice Castle is a castle in Tábor in the South Bohemian Region of the Czech Republic.

== Location ==
Měšice Castle is located in the village of Měšice, which is an administrative part of Tábor. It is situated along the Chýnov–Pelhřimov road.

== History ==
Over its 450-year history, the design of the castle has changed and evolved according to the times, tastes, requirements and finances of successive aristocrats. The immediate environs of the castle is known as the Castle Park.

In 1545, the knight Prokop of Hejlovec built a Renaissance style manor house in the village of Měšice. During this time, the villages of Měšice, Čekanice and Stoklasná Lhota all belonged to the Prokop family of Hejlovec.

John Joseph Caretto, the Count of Mellisimo, rebuilt the manor house in 1699 into a Baroque castle. In 1792, John Hannygar of Eberg built special water toilets in the castle. These water toilets still work today. In 1817, John Schmidgräber of Lusteneg enlarged the building and, in the Empire style, installed an ostentatious staircase and recreated the facade of the castle.

After 1877, the castle belonged to the Nádherný family (barons) of Borutín. Since 1997, the castle has been the property of Jan Berwid-Buquoy.

== Tourism ==
There is a tour named "Living, Life and Work in the Château". The furniture that was owned by well-known personalities such Aristide Briand, Winston Churchill, Jan Masaryk, Pierre Trudeau, Jan Bervida is exhibited, among others.

Special exhibitions include:

- "John F. Kennedy and His Times" – Policy, Economy (American historical shares belonging to well known personalities (including Kennedy, his brother Robert F. Kennedy, Richard Nixon, Elvis Presley and James Dean) and Social affairs of the 40s, 50s and 60s in the United States.
- "Konrad Adenauer – Politician, European and Humanist" – An exhibition about the first chancellor of the Federal Republic of Germany.
- "The Occupation of Czechoslovakia by the Soviet army on 21st August 1968" – Photos, stories and weapons.

== Other ==
The castle is also the seat of the Czech Institute For International Meetings, which was founded in 2000 and its President is Jan Berwid-Buquoy.

== Bibliography ==
- Cikhart, Roman: "Táborsko", Tábor 1921.
- Pourová, Renata: "Hrady, zámky a tvrze, které přežily rok 2000 – Jihočeský kraj" (Castles, Chateaux and Fortresses Extant in the Year 2000 – The Region of Southern Bohemia), ISBN 80-239-7724-5, České Budějovice 2006.
