= 1947 Croydon Dakota accident =

1947 aviation accident

Accident
- Date: 25 January 1947
- Summary: Loss of control
- Site: Croydon Airport; 51°21′11″N 0°07′01″W
- Total fatalities: 12
- Total survivors: 13

First aircraft
- Type: Douglas C-47A Skytrain
- Operator: Spencer Airways
- Registration: VP-YFD. (Note: Some reports show that aircraft was painted as VP-YFE)
- Flight origin: Croydon Airport
- Stopover: Leonardo da Vinci–Fiumicino Airport, Rome, Italy
- Destination: Salisbury, Rhodesia
- Passengers: 18
- Crew: 5
- Fatalities: 12
- Survivors: 11

Second aircraft
- Type: Douglas C-47A Skytrain
- Operator: ČSA
- Registration: OK-WDB
- Passengers: 0
- Crew: 2
- Survivors: 2

The 1947 Croydon Dakota accident occurred on 25 January 1947 when a Spencer Airways Douglas C-47A Skytrain (Dakota) (Note: "Dakota" was the service name of C-47 aircraft operated by British and Commonwealth air forces and it was used post war in the United Kingdom and the Commonwealth for any of the Douglas C-47/DC-3 family. The aircraft in the accident was a former United States Air Force C-47A Skytrain but was referred to in contemporary sources as a Dakota.) failed to get airborne from Croydon Airport near London, and crashed into a parked and empty ČSA Douglas C-47 destroying both aircraft and killing 11 passengers and one crew member.

The Ministry of Civil Aviation, named the dead as: Sisters Rousselot, Lester and Martin, of La Sagesse Convent, London, N.W.; Mr. and Mrs. Cond and their two children; Miss Cecilia Beckett, Mr. Mervyn Frazer, Mrs. Warren, of Dublin, Mr. Schauder and Captain E. Spencer.

== Accident ==
It was snowing and the airfield at Croydon was covered in dark snow clouds when at 11:40 the Spencer Airways Dakota attempted to depart bound for Salisbury in Rhodesia. The C-47A had just lifted from the runway at Croydon when the starboard wing dropped, then the aircraft turned to the left and the port wing dropped. The pilot was seen to apply full starboard aileron but the bank angle increased to 40 degrees with the port wing tip only a few feet from the ground. As the aircraft reached the perimeter track of the airfield, the aircraft levelled and then swung to the right. The aircraft bounced on the ground and crashed head-on into a parked CSA Douglas C-47, registration OK-WDB; both aircraft caught fire, and were subsequently destroyed. Eleven of the 18 passengers and one of the five crew died.

Seven of the 11 survivors were taken to Croydon General Hospital but only two had to stay for further treatment. Two mechanics who were working on the CSA aircraft escaped without injury.

The Ministry of Civil Aviation instituted "an inspection of Certificates of Airworthiness, Certificates of Safety and crew licences" at airfields under their control to ensure these documents were in order. The aircraft did not have a C of A, nor a valid Certificate of Safety, and no member of crew held a Navigators licence nor a licence to sign a Certificate of Safety.

== Investigation ==
A coroners inquest was opened at Croydon on 29 January 1947 into the twelve deaths. It was determined that all but three of the deaths were caused by asphyxia from the inhalation of smoke and flames. One of the male passengers died from a severe blow to the head, another from a cerebral haemorrhage. The pilot and owner of the aircraft Edward Spencer died from carbon monoxide poisoning. After an account by the aircraft's engineer the inquest was postponed until 18 February. The inquest resumed with evidence from the co-pilot and witnesses on the ground, the jury returned a verdict of misadventure.

Following the completion of the coroners court the Chief Inspector of Accidents opened an enquiry on 24 February. Evidence was taken from the surviving passengers and crew and baggage loaders. The co-pilot explained that the aircraft had just been delivered from the United States to Heathrow Airport following the purchase by Spencer. It had been ferried to Croydon the day before the accident and the long-range fuel tanks had been removed and the seats fitted. Preparing the aircraft had taken all day and night and Spencer was said to have had only two hours sleep. In the morning the starboard engine had a lack of pressure but the co-pilot and the radio operator said before the flight that it was OK. Another witness gave evidence that the wings were covered in snow and he had not seen any attempt to defrost the aircraft. A statement given by an inspector of police from Northern Rhodesia attested to the fact that Spencer did not smoke or drink and had many hours flying experience since the early 1930s. Following the statement about Spencer's lack of sleep the counsel representing the next-of-kin of Captain Spencer made a formal protest that they had not been able to question the statement. The inquiry was closed on 28 February following technical evidence and a statement from an aircraft engineer who had witnessed that the starboard engine had been in "a bad state" and was popping and spluttering before the aircraft had taken off.

== Cause ==
The accident was determined to be the result of loss of control by the pilot while attempting to take-off in a heavily loaded aircraft in poor visibility attributed to "an error of flying technique by a pilot who lacked Dakota experience". Other factors may have been snow and frost of the wings and fatigue of the pilot.
