= Czech Institute For International Meetings =

Non-profit organisation in Czech Republic

Czech Institute For International Meetings (Czech: Český Institut Mezinárodního Setkání; CIFIM) is a Czech non-profit organisation. It was founded in Měšice Castle in Tábor.

== Focus ==
The CIFIM charter was registered by the Ministry of the Interior on October 23, 2000 (registration number: VS/1-1/45 046/00-R). Identification number (IČO): 70868581.

CIFIM is a non-profit charity concerned with humanities (political sciences, economy, and social relationships), research and publicity, Christian ethics, cultural and artistic activities (Art. III, par 1, Organisation Statute).

== Sections of CIFIM ==
Czech Institute for International Meetings consists of 4 sections (Art. IV, CIFIM sections):

- Human Rights and Education Association: international association in the Czech Republic dedicated to the legacy of John and Robert Kennedy's struggle for human rights and the education of the masses.
- Czech-German Meetings Club: the mission of the club is to break the stereotypes between Czechs and Germans, to increase co-operation in the newly integrated Europe (European Union), and to contribute to the security of and development in Central Europe.
- Ludwig Erhard Forum: economic, political, scientific and research-oriented activities in the field of economy in the spirit of the "Father of the German economic miracle" and the founder of "social market economy".
- Jan Bervida Society: culture, literature, arts, music and social development without boundaries for the sake of European and international integration.

== Permanent exhibitions ==
- Konrad Adenauer - Person, Politician and European.
- The Occupation of Czechoslovakia through the soviet Red Army on August 21, 1968.

21 August 1968 - Soviet, Polish, Hungarian, Bulgarian and East German units commit aggression against Czechoslovakia by night.

- John F. Kennedy and His Time.

Also the presentation of US historical shares, which belong to fame American Shareholders (coming soon) 2007.

== Cooperation and Protectors ==
- European Parliament (Jaroslav Zvěřina - since 2005 "Jaroslav-Zvěřina-Series", Policy, Economy and Social Affairs), Czech Republic.
- Konrad Adenauer Foundation (Common meetings and general support) in Berlin and Prague.
