= ČSA Flight 475 =

Aircraft accident

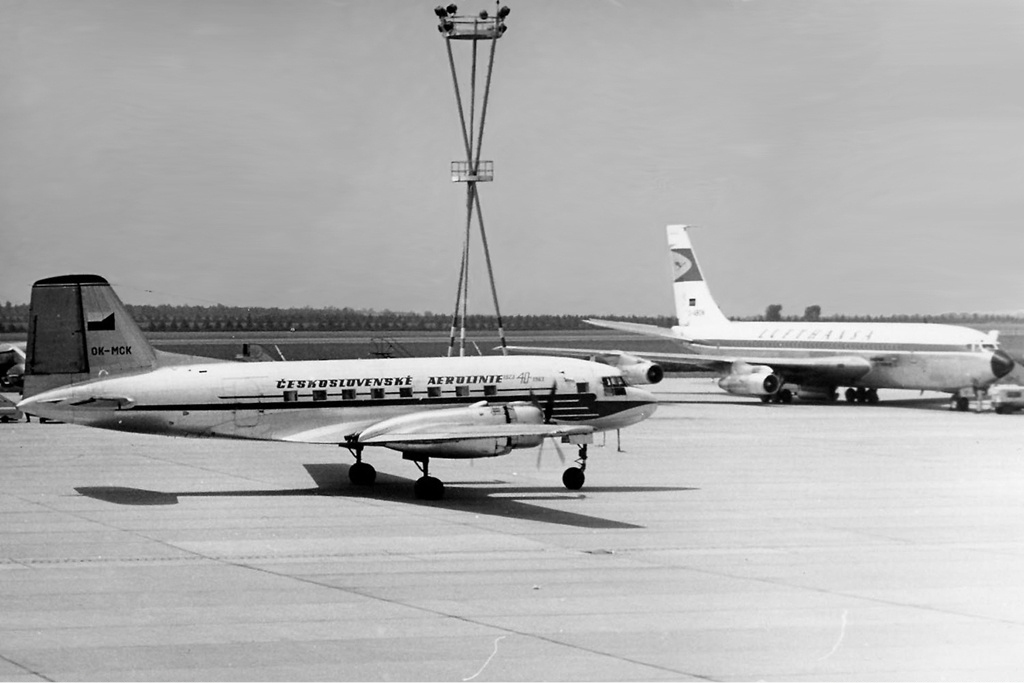
- A ČSA Avia 14 similar to the one involved.

Accident
- Date: 11 February 1977
- Summary: Controlled flight into terrain due to pilot error
- Site: near Bratislava Airport, Bratislava, Czechoslovakia

Aircraft
- Aircraft type: Avia 14
- Operator: ČSA
- Registration: OK-OCA
- Flight origin: Prague Ruzyně International Airport, Prague, Czechoslovakia
- Destination: Bratislava Airport, Bratislava, Czechoslovakia
- Occupants: 5
- Passengers: 2
- Crew: 3
- Fatalities: 4
- Survivors: 1

ČSA Flight 475 was a domestic airmail service in Czechoslovakia from Prague to Bratislava. On 11 February 1977, the Avia 14 aircraft struck the ground during the Bratislava Airport approach, killing 4 of the 5 on board.

== Accident ==
The crew executed the approach to runway 22 with poor visibility. They descended below the minimum altitude and clipped through branches before colliding with the ground, less than two kilometers from the runway. Two crew members (Miroslav Meluš and Václav Šmíd) and two employees of Pošta-Košice 2 (Tibor Nagy and Imrich Štofan) died. The aircraft's captain survived.

== Memorial ==
In 2024, a memorial was built by graphic designer Miroslav Valček, a collaborator of the Ivanka Historical Society - the same association that built a monument for ČSA Flight 001.
