= Click4Sky =

Subsidiary of Czech Airlines

Click4Sky was a subsidiary brand of Czech Airlines used as a virtual low-cost airline to sell tickets for flights operated by its parent company.

== Overview ==
The brand was introduced in 2007 as a measure to compete with the growing competition from low-cost airlines. Unlike other actual low-cost airlines, Click4Sky did not operate any flights itself - instead it was being used as a marketing brand in order to sell unsold seats on existing Czech Airlines flights. Therefore, Click4Sky offered full service - free refreshment etc. In addition, the brand used to sell all seats at a fixed price and it was not possible to buy one-way tickets.

Click4Sky was selling tickets on flights to thirty-four European and African destinations from its Prague hub, including flights to Amsterdam, Athens, Barcelona, Belgrade, Berlin, Bologna, Bratislava, Brussels, Budapest, Cairo, Copenhagen, Cologne Bonn, Dublin, Düsseldorf, Frankfort, Hamburg, Hanover, Istanbul, Košice, Kraków, Ljubljana, London, Madrid, Manchester, Milan, Munich, Oslo, Riga, Rome, Sofia, Thessaloniki, Stuttgart, Tallinn, Venice, Vilnius, and Zurich.

However, this service stopped in November 2009 after only two years. Instead, the Click4Sky brand was then used to promote a low-fare search engine for Czech Airlines flights instead of selling unsold seats at a fixed price.
