= Radkov (Tábor District) =

- Municipality
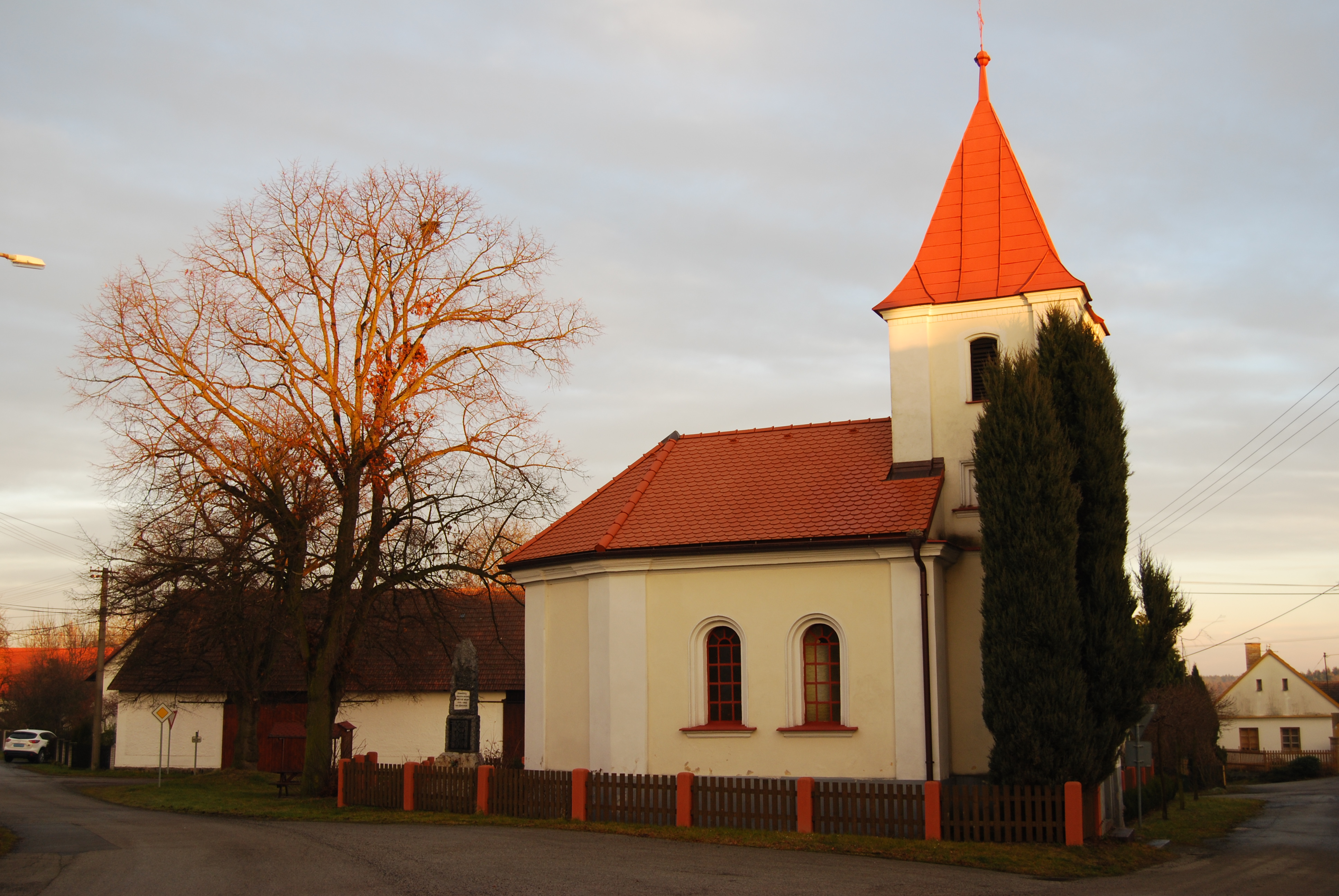
- Chapel in the centre of Radkov

- Location in the Czech Republic
- Coordinates: 49°27′57″N 14°36′40″E
- Country: Czech Republic
- Region: South Bohemian
- District: Tábor
- First mentioned: 1419

Area
  - Total: 5.39 km^{2} (2.08 sq mi)
- Elevation: 519 m (1,703 ft)

Population (2026-01-01)
  - Total: 167
  - Density: 31.0/km^{2} (80.2/sq mi)
- Time zone: UTC+1 (CET)
  - Summer (DST): UTC+2 (CEST)
- Postal code: 391 31
- Website: www.radkov.eu

Radkov is a municipality and village in Tábor District in the South Bohemian Region of the Czech Republic. It has about 200 inhabitants.

Radkov lies approximately 7 kilometres (4 mi) north-west of Tábor, 56 km (35 mi) north of České Budějovice, and 71 km (44 mi) south of Prague.

== Administrative division ==
Radkov consists of two municipal parts (in brackets population according to the 2021 census):

- Radkov (144)
- Paseka (30)

== Demographics ==
Historical population
| Year | Pop. | ±% |
|---|---|---|
| 1869 | 401 | — |
| 1880 | 425 | +6.0% |
| 1890 | 421 | −0.9% |
| 1900 | 419 | −0.5% |
| 1910 | 396 | −5.5% |
| 1921 | 366 | −7.6% |
| 1930 | 333 | −9.0% |
| 1950 | 245 | −26.4% |
| 1961 | 205 | −16.3% |
| 1970 | 187 | −8.8% |
| 1980 | 182 | −2.7% |
| 1991 | 160 | −12.1% |
| 2001 | 140 | −12.5% |
| 2011 | 175 | +25.0% |
| 2021 | 174 | −0.6% |
Source: Censuses

== Notable people ==
- Jan Bervida (1893–1962), aviation expert
