= Jan Bervida =

Czech aviation expert (1893–1962)

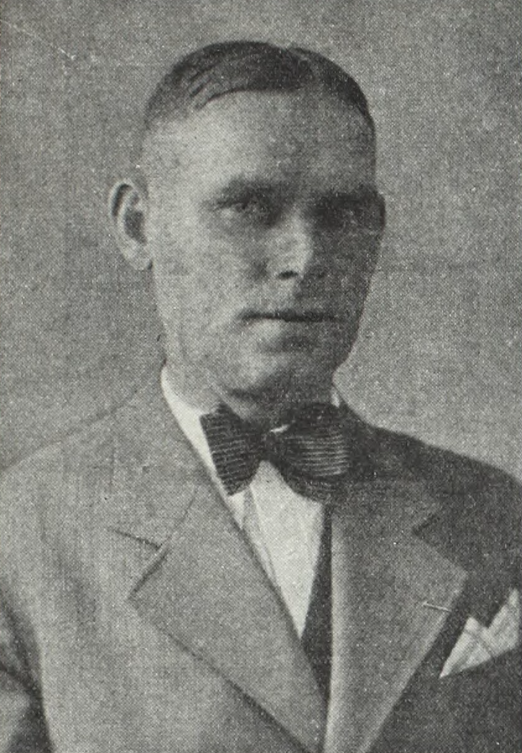
Bervida in 1937

Jan Bervida (4 September 1893 – 26 January 1962) was a Czech aviation expert. He was the head of department of Czechoslovak Civilian Airways (1929–1938 and 1945–1947) and vice president of ICAO and FAI. He was also a member of ICAN and the Council of Free Czechoslovakia.

== Biography ==
Bervida was born on 4 September 1893 in Radkov. After finishing secondary school in Tábor he began studying at the Imperial-Royal Technical University (now Czech Technical University in Prague) in Prague. In 1914, during World War I, he was sent to Eastern Front and 1915 Bervida was taken prisoner by Russians, and later as a private of the Czechoslovak Legion he took part in a march to the United States via Vladivostok. Upon returning to his home country he graduated from the University of Technology, receiving an MA (Ing.) in Aeronautic Engineering.

Bervida died on 26 January 1962 in New York City.

== Career ==
=== Public Works Ministry ===
In 1927–1929, he worked at the Public Works Ministry in Prague, where he became Head of the Aviation Department in 1929. By some sources short time before the occupation of Czechoslovakia by the Army of the Nazi Germany in 1938, President Edvard Beneš promoted him to Army General in Reserve. There is not any remark in Czech military archives about it.

=== The Nazi Occupation 1939–1945 ===
During the Nazi Occupation of Czechoslovakia from 1939 to 1945, Bervida, as a former member of Czechoslovak Legion, was fired in 1939 and became a teacher. He taught at a secondary school specializing in engineering. Later he was arrested and interrogated. Because he collaborated with the Czechoslovak government-in-exile in London, he was sentenced to death. He was saved by the end of World War II in May 1945.

=== Post-war ===
In 1945–1947, Bervida became Department Head at the Ministry of Transport (Civilian Airways) and Czechoslovak Airlines Director.

In 1946 was Bervida elected vice president of the Fédération Aéronautique Internationale (FAI) and one year later 1947 was he elected vice president to the International Civil Aviation Organization (ICAO).

He was unjustly charged in a court case brought against him, but the case was dropped after the intervention of President Edvard Beneš.

During Communist takeover in 1948 he was in France, where applied for citizenship. In Paris he was involved with Czechoslovak exile authorities (Council of Free Czechoslovakia). Shortly thereafter he emigrated to the United States, where he worked with the ICAO in New York and in Montreal.

== Bibliography ==
- Bervida, Jan: Naše křídla (Our Wings), Prague 1939.
