= Czech Airlines =

Czech airline holding company

ČSA-Czech Airlines ČSA-České aerolinie

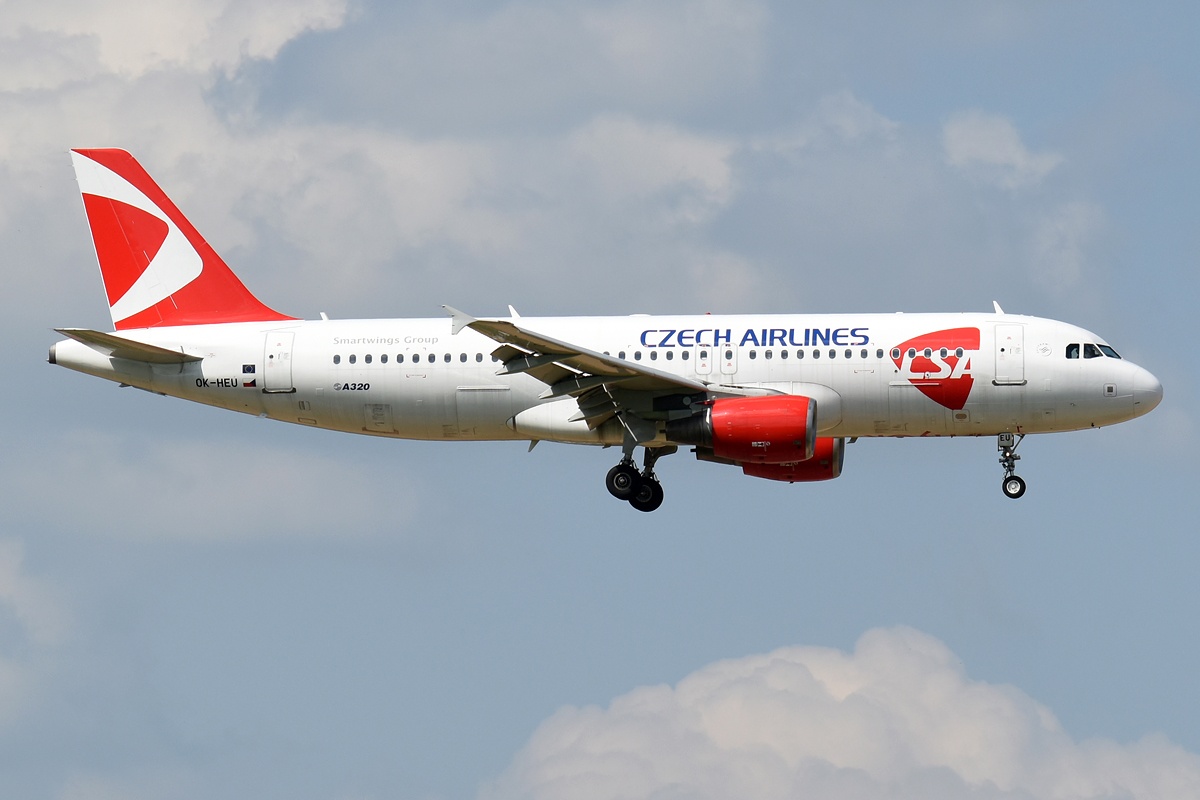
- Airbus A320-200
IATA	ICAO	Call sign
OK	CSA	CSA
- Founded: 6 October 1923 (Note: as Czechoslovak State Airlines (Czech: Československé státní aerolinie))
- Commenced operations: 29 October 1923
- Ceased operations: 26 October 2024 (as an airline)
- AOC #: CZ-1
- Hubs: Václav Havel Airport Prague
- Alliance: SkyTeam (2000–2024)
- Subsidiaries: Smartwings (100%)
- Fleet size: 6 (operated by Smartwings)
- Parent company: Pegasus Airlines
- Headquarters: Prague, Czech Republic
- Key people: Emre Pekesen, CEO
- Revenue: ▼CZK 9.5 bn (2014)
- Operating income: ▲CZK 285 m (2016)
- Total assets: ▼CZK 2.2 bn (2014)
- Total equity: ▼CZK (0.3) bn (2014)
- Employees: 587
- Website: ceskeaerolinie.cz

Czech Airlines (abbreviation: ČSA, Czech: České aerolinie, a.s.) is a Czech airline brand and holding company. Established in 1923, it was part of the privately owned Smartwings Group since 2017. After filing for bankruptcy in 2021 and undergoing reorganization, it ceased independent air operations and was transformed into the holding's parent company on 26 October 2024. Pegasus Airlines, a Turkish low-cost carrier, then had completed acquisition of Czech Airlines and Smartwings Group on 1 October 2026.

As an airline, between 1923 and 2024, it operated as the flag carrier of Czechoslovakia and subsequently the Czech Republic. Until ceasing air operations, it was the world's fifth oldest operating airline. Its hub was Václav Havel Airport Prague. It was the first airline in the world to fly regular jet-only routes (between Prague and Moscow). The airline ran a frequent flyer programme called "OK Plus", named after the airline's International Air Transport Association designation, as well as the term of approval; OK also featured prominently in its previous livery, and was the prefix of Czech aircraft registrations. From 2001 to 2024, it was a member of the SkyTeam alliance.

The last scheduled flight of Czech Airlines was flight OK767 on 26 October 2024, from Paris Charles de Gaulle Airport to Václav Havel Airport Prague, operated by an Airbus A320-214.

== History ==
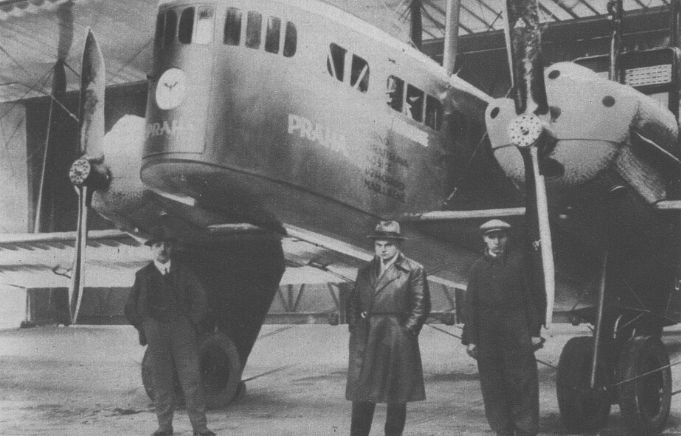
Farman F.60 Goliath flown in 1929

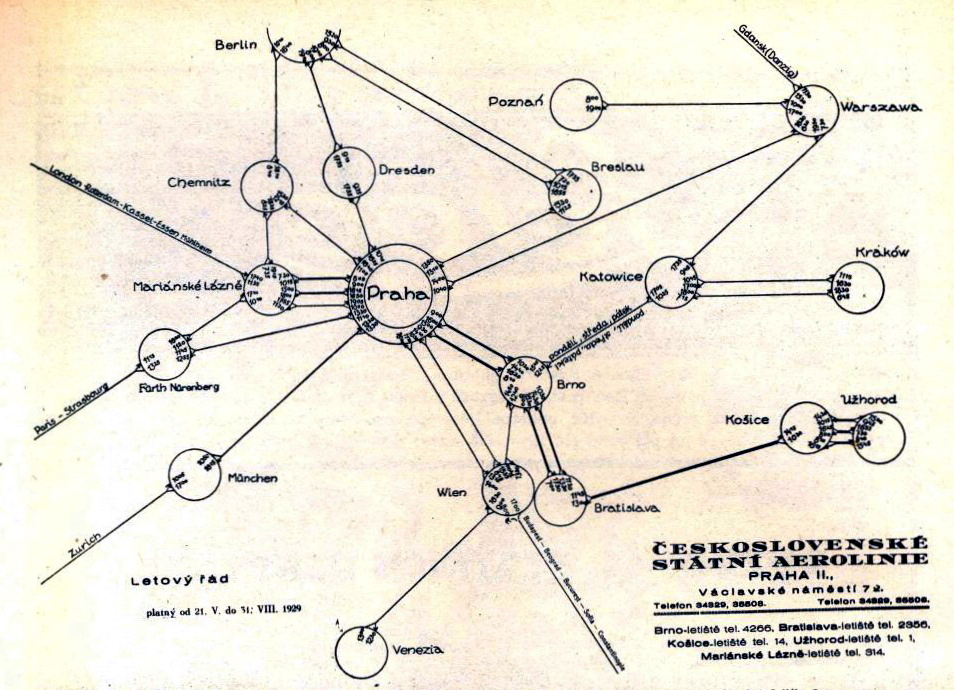
1929 network

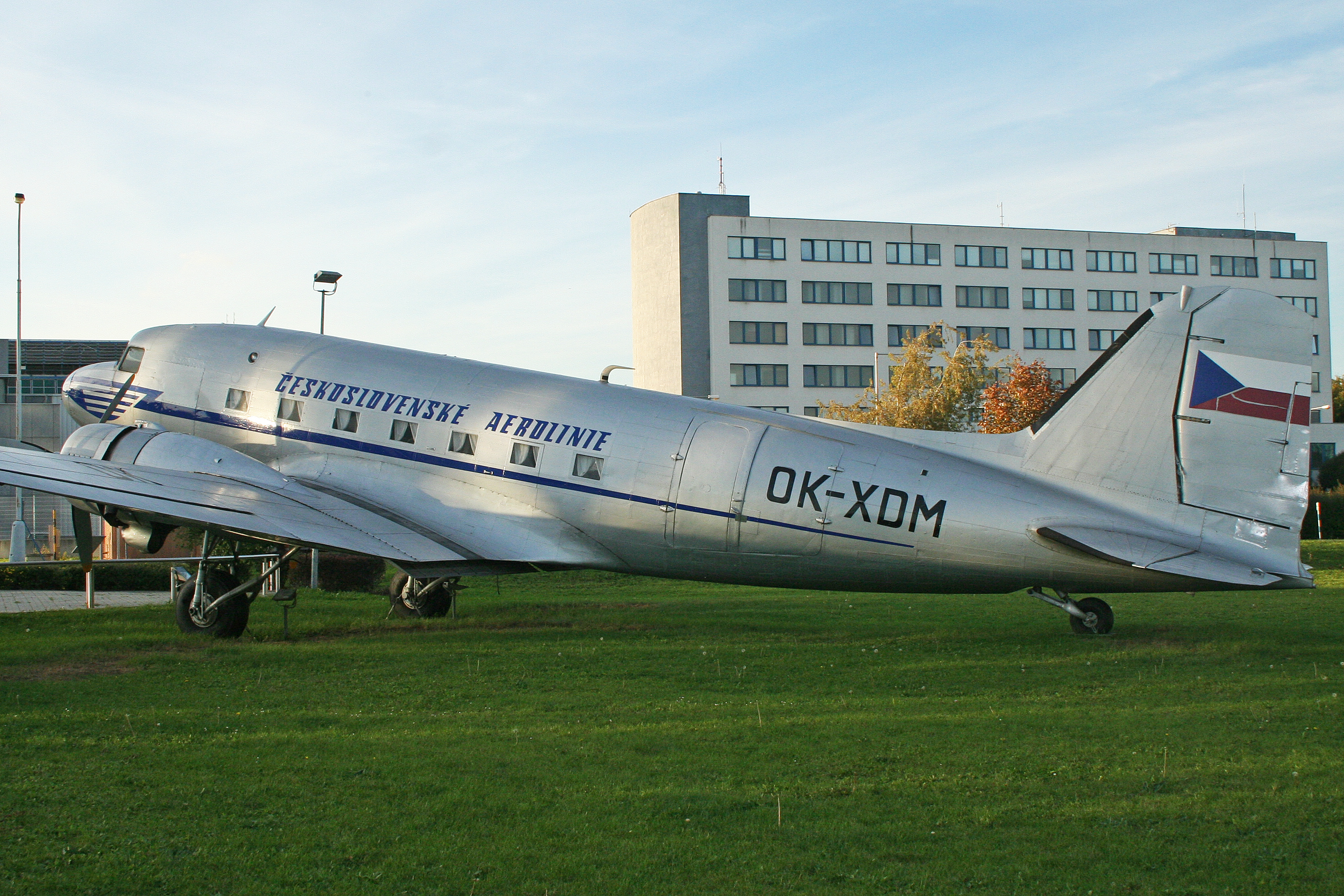
Preserved Douglas DC-3

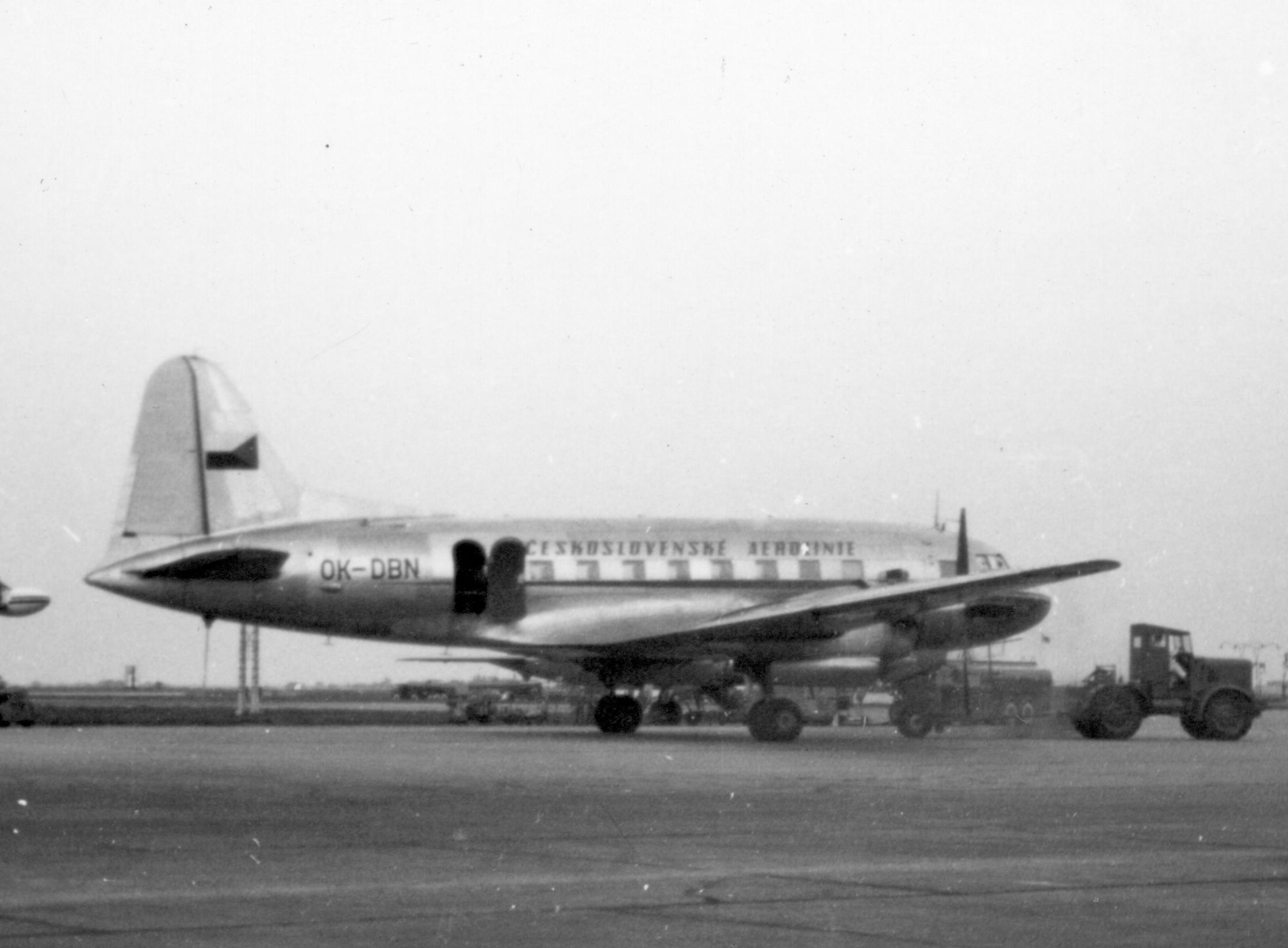
Ilyushin Il-12 at Paris Orly Airport in 1957

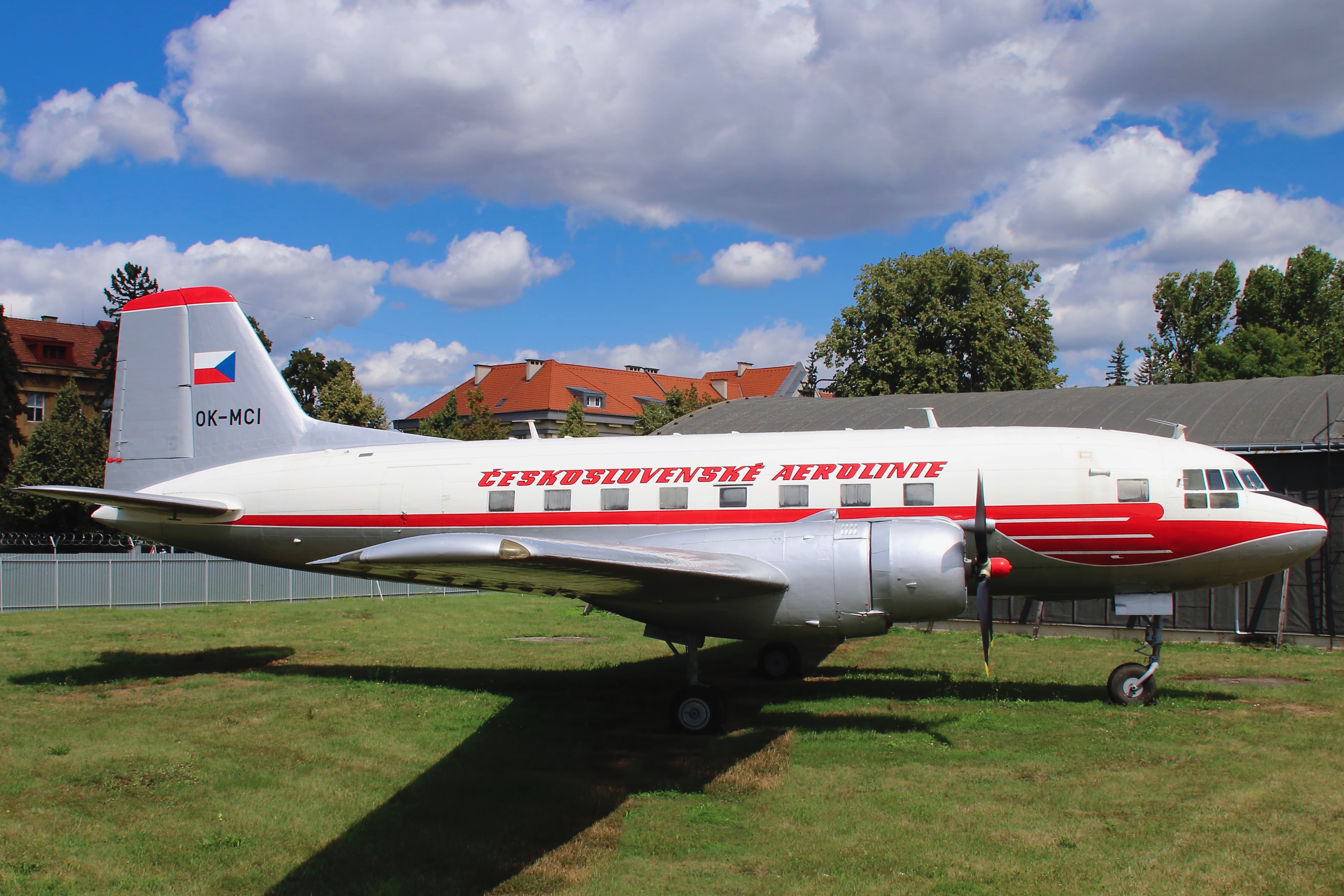
Avia Il-14 at Prague Aviation Museum, Kbely

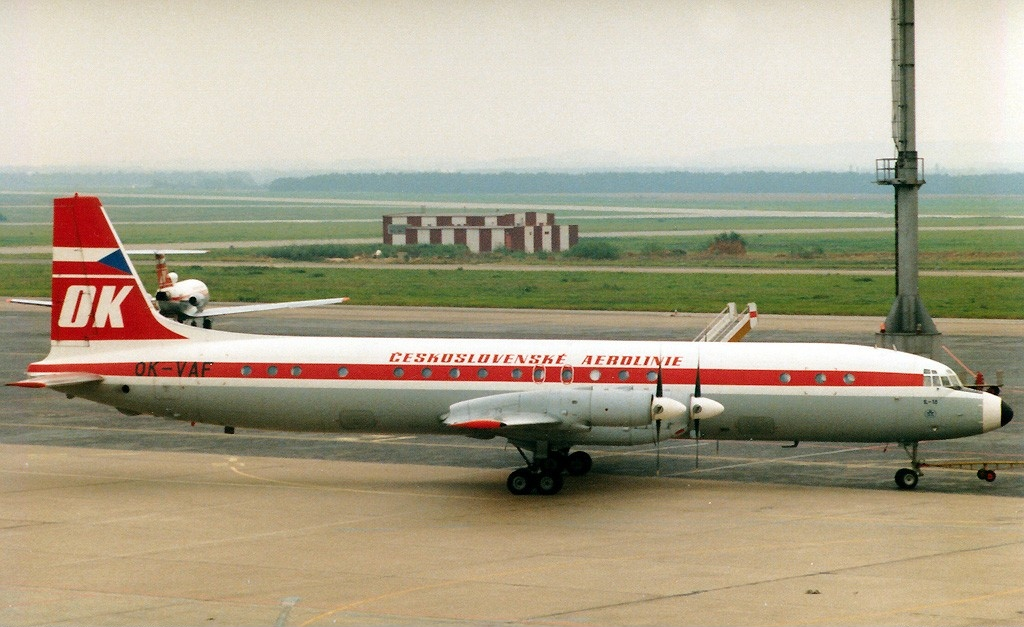
Ilyushin Il-18

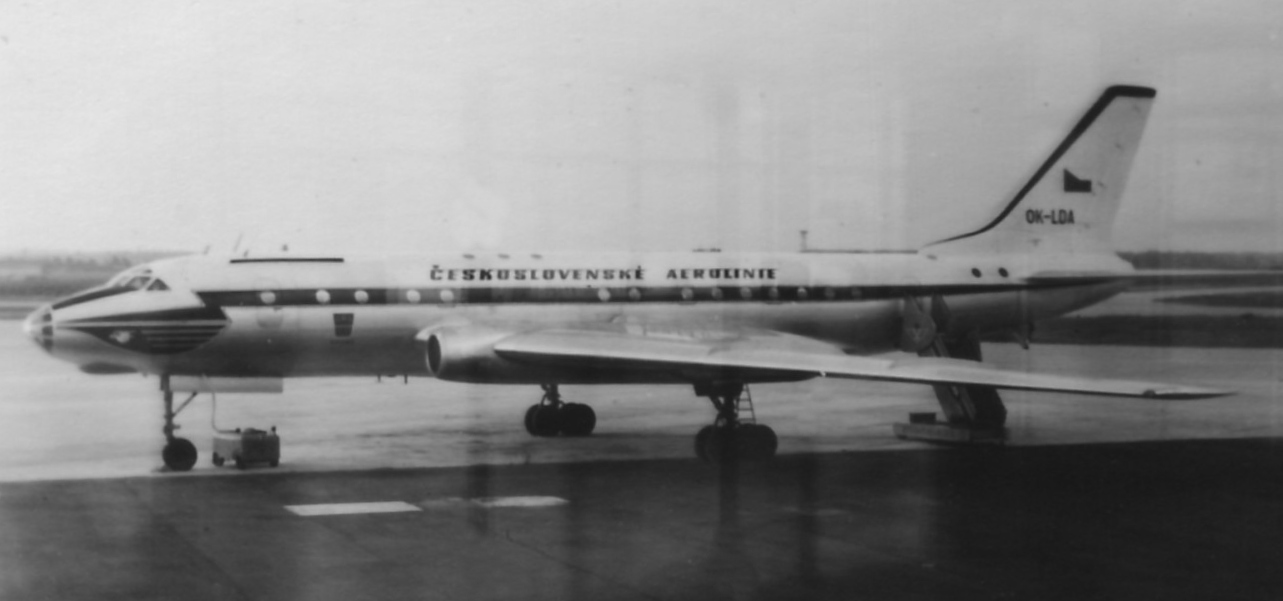
Tupolev Tu-104 in 1958 - this aircraft is now displayed in the Prague Aviation Museum, Kbely

=== Early years ===
ČSA was founded on 6 October 1923 by the Czechoslovak government as ČSA Československé státní aerolinie (Czechoslovak State Airlines). Twenty-three days later, its first transport flight took place, flying between Prague and Bratislava. It only operated domestic services until its first international flight from Prague to Bratislava and on to Zagreb in Yugoslavia in 1930. After the dismemberment of Czechoslovakia in 1939 and splitting the country into three parts, the airline was dissolved.

=== 1945 to 1960 ===
After the end of Second World War, the airline was renamed Československé aerolinie N.P. (Czechoslovak Airlines) and started irregular operations in September 1945. Schedules followed on 1 March 1946. Following a coup in February 1948, the Czechoslovak Communist Party suspended some of ČSA's western European and Middle Eastern routes and also gradually replaced much of the fleet with Soviet-built airliners, due to the embargo imposed by the West on the western-built aircraft spares and other equipment. The Ilyushin Il-14 was updated and built under licence in Czechoslovakia as the Avia-14.

In 1950, ČSA became the world's first victim of a mass hijacking. Three Czechoslovak Douglas DC-3 airliners flown to an American air base at Erding, near Munich, stirred the world on both sides of the "burnt through" Iron Curtain and the case intensified the Cold War between East and West overnight. On the morning of 24 March, the three aircraft landed near Munich instead of at Prague; the first from Brno, at 08:20, the second from Moravská Ostrava at 08:40, and the third from Bratislava at 09:20. Two-thirds of the people on board were unwilling participants and later returned to Czechoslovakia. The Czechoslovak Communist government commissioned a 'flight to freedom' book, stage play, and film (all bearing the name Kidnap to Erding) which celebrated the kidnapped returnees as heroes who had not allowed themselves to be swayed by promises of capitalist opulence. Those who remained and requested political asylum in West Germany were proclaimed criminals for whom the Prague government vigorously requested extradition – in vain. The pilot from Brno was Josef Klesnil, a former Royal Air Force pilot with 311 squadron, who flew from Brno to Erding with a pistol pointed at his head.

In 1957, ČSA became the third airline to fly jet services, taking delivery of and putting into service the very first Tupolev Tu-104A that year. ČSA was the only airline other than Aeroflot to operate the Tu-104. The Tu-104A service that began in 1957 between Prague and Moscow was the first jet-only connection (other airlines used both jets and piston/turboprop aircraft). The airline's first transatlantic services started on 3 February 1962 with a flight to Havana using a Bristol Britannia turboprop leased from Cubana de Aviación. ČSA's transatlantic flights were code-shared with Cubana's services to Prague, and Cubana's crews provided initial training and assistance in the operation of the Britannia.

=== 1960 to 1990 ===
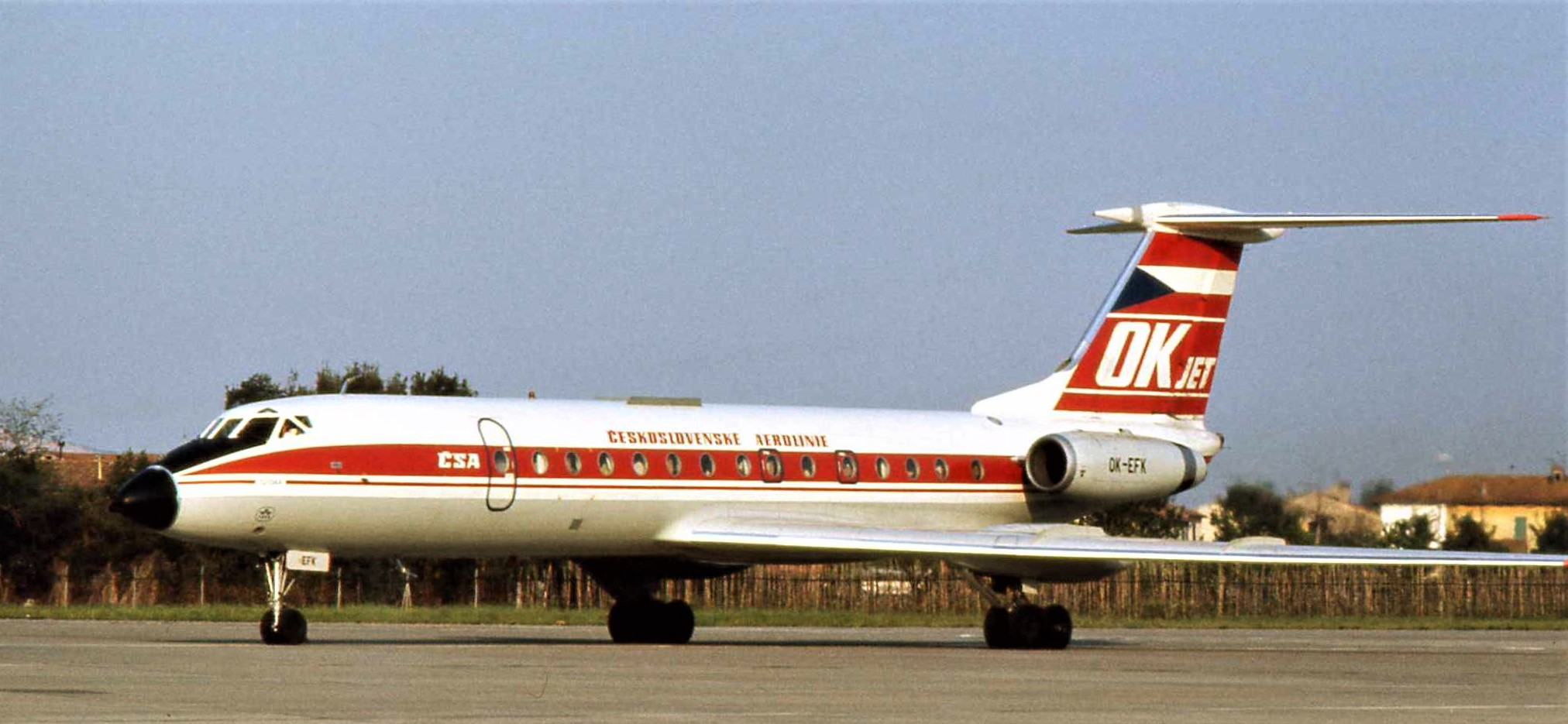
Tupolev Tu-134A at Pisa Airport in 1975

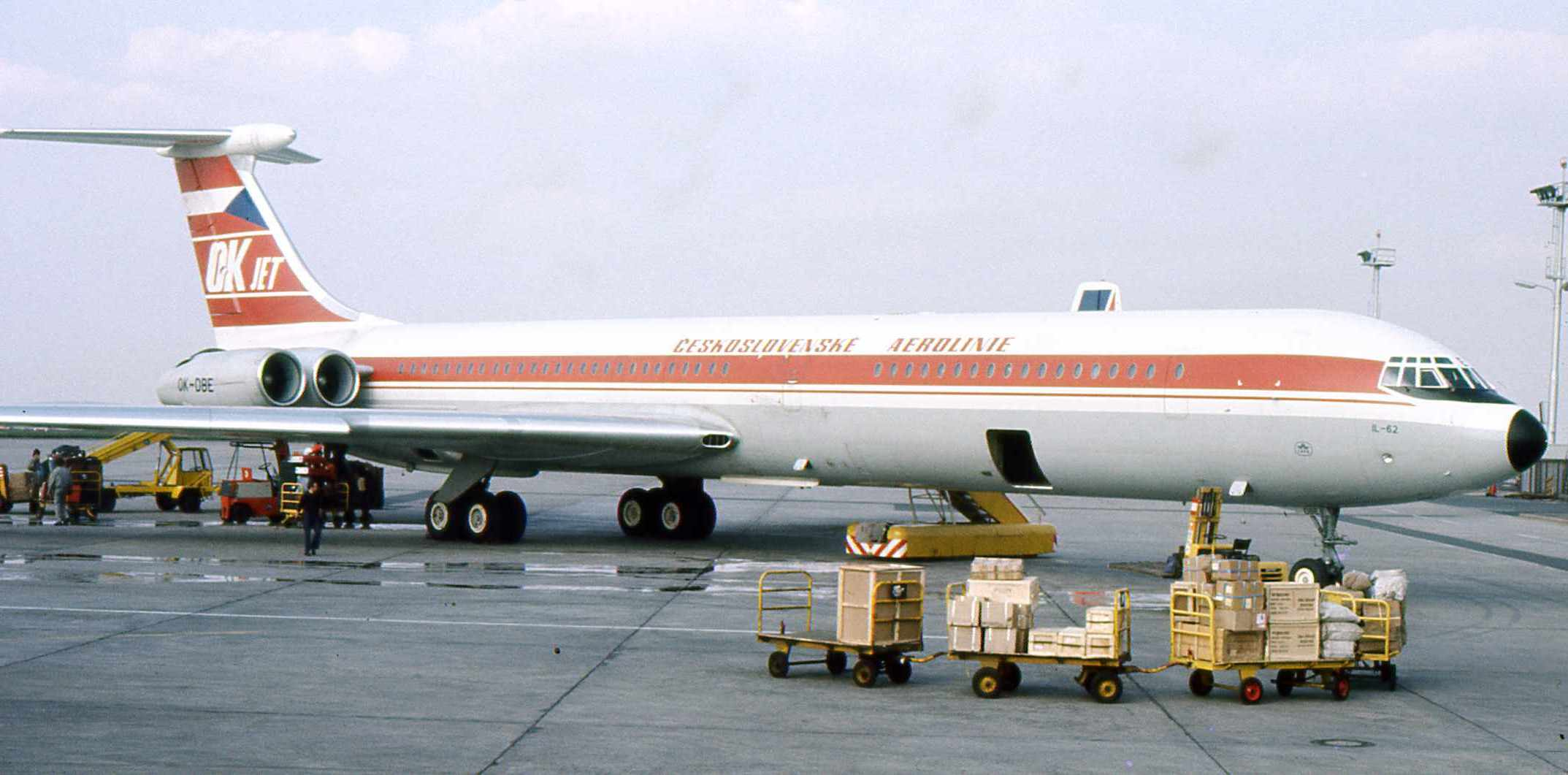
Ilyushin Il-62 at Milan Linate Airport in 1975

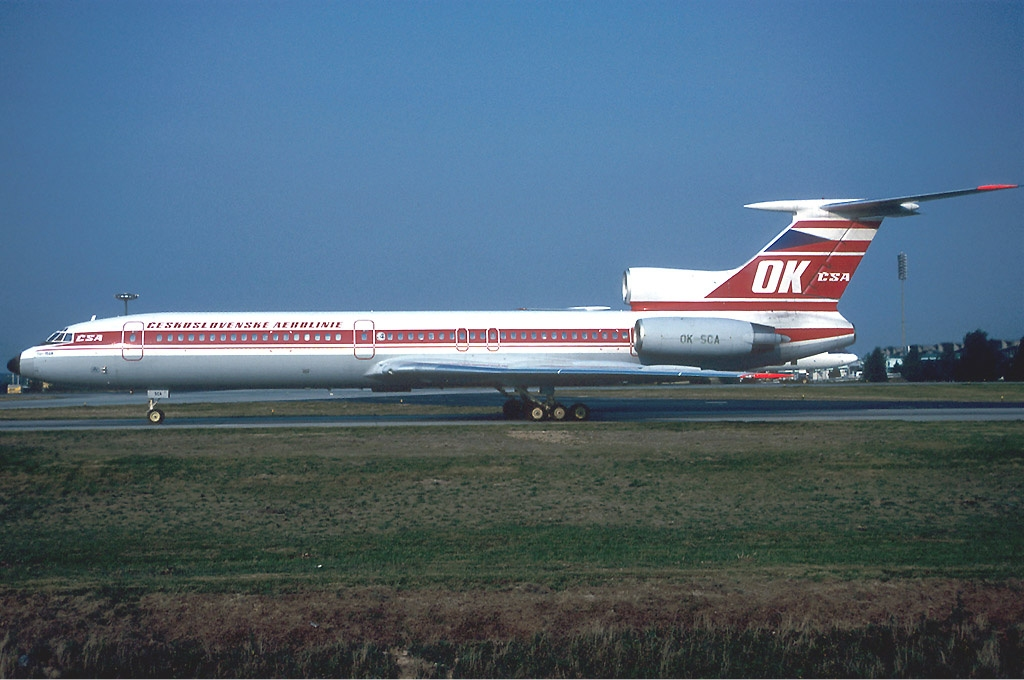
Tupolev Tu-154M

From the late 1960s, ČSA used a range of Soviet-built aircraft and modified versions for its extensive European and intercontinental services, totalling some 50 international and 15 domestic destinations. The Britannia was replaced with shorter-range Ilyushin Il-18D turboprops at this time, and transatlantic routes were established to Montreal and New York City in addition to Havana, with refuelling stops at Shannon (Eire) and Gander (Newfoundland). Along with the Il-18D, aircraft in ČSA's fleet included the short-range Tupolev Tu-134, medium-range Tupolev Tu-154, and long-range Ilyushin Il-62. As with several other airlines, the Il-62 was the first long-range jet airliner to be put into operation by ČSA (also the first foreign customer to buy Il-62s from the USSR). ČSA operated a fleet of 21 Il-62s between 1969 and 1997, including six Il-62Ms. A ČSA-registered Il-62 and three Il-62Ms were used as official Czechoslovak and Czech government transports between 1974 and 1996.

After absorbing the "heavier" part of Slov-Air and taking its Let L-410A Turbolet turboprop commuters into its fleet in the early 1970s, ČSA partner airliner Slov-Air became the world's first to have a captain, Ján Mičica, slain at the controls by a hijacker, during a hijacking to West Germany. The aircraft involved, OK-ADN, is currently displayed in an open-air aircraft museum in Martin, Slovakia.

=== The 1990s and 2000s ===
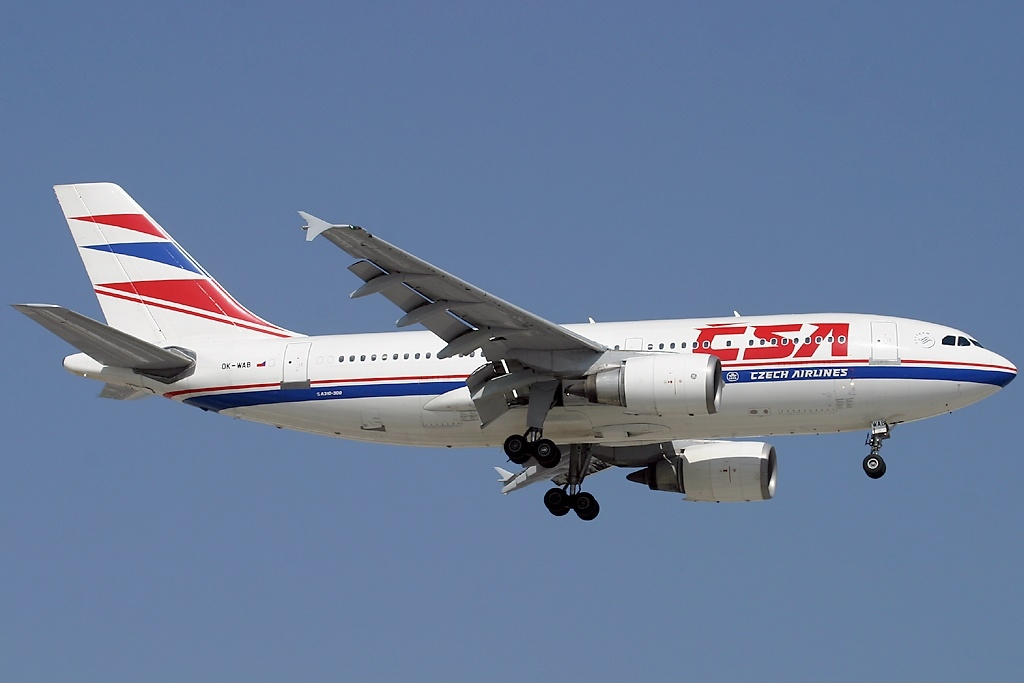
Airbus A310-300 in 2005

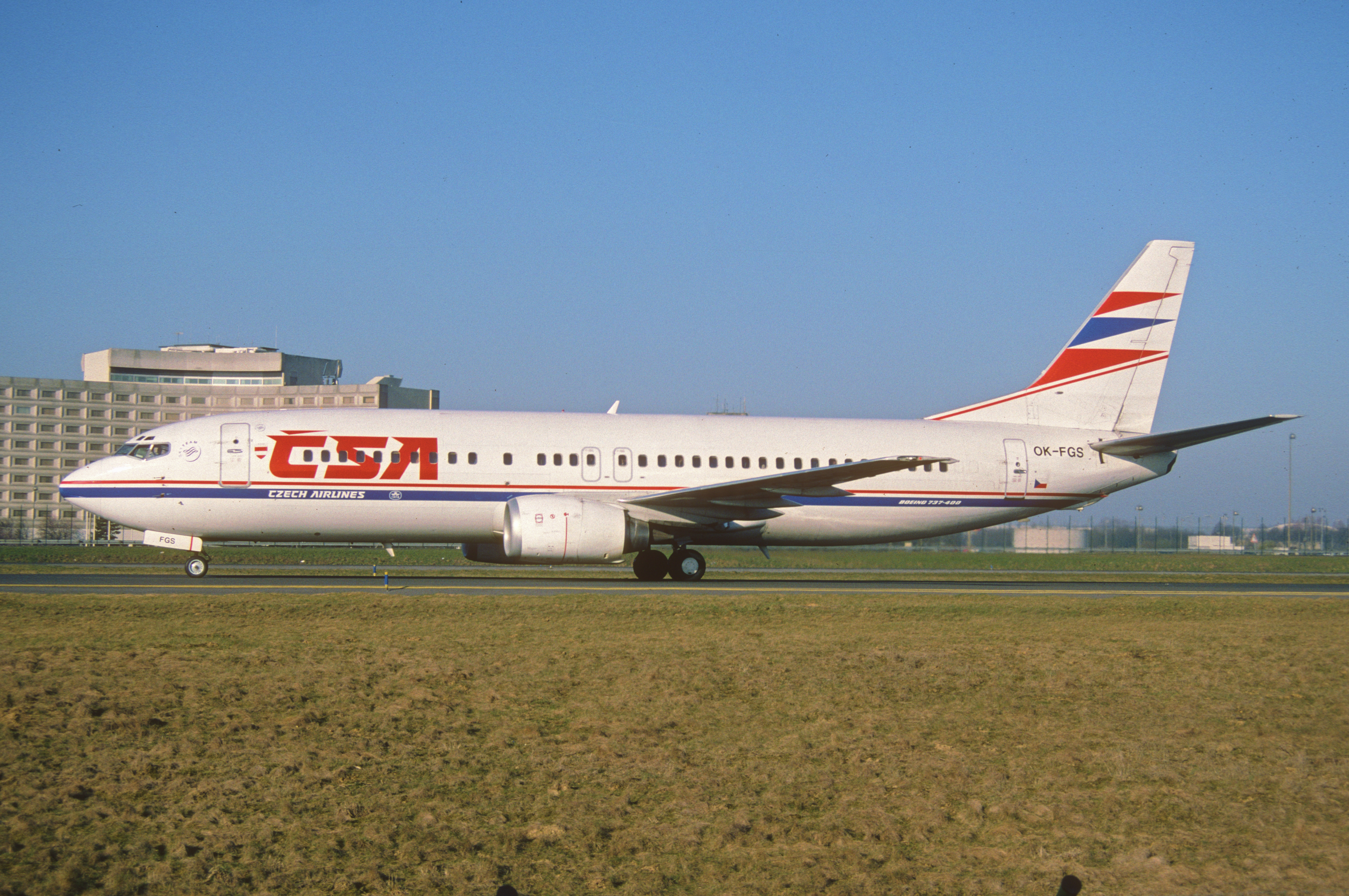
Boeing 737-400

On 1 January 1991, Czechoslovak Airlines split into two companies: Czechoslovak Airlines, which would become Czech Airlines, and Slov Air, which had previously been a subsidiary of the original Czechoslovak Airlines. The division of Czechoslovak Airlines ownership in 1991 between the governing bodies of the Czech and Slovak parts of Czechoslovakia had no connection to the split of Czechoslovakia two years later, in January 1993.

The post-split Czechoslovak Airlines became privatized in 1992. Air France and the European Bank for Reconstruction and Development owned 19.1% of shares of the new company, while the Fund of National Ownership of the Czech Republic owned 49.3%. Czech Insurance Company owned 4.5%, the city of Prague owned 3.5%, and the last 2.3% was split evenly between three Slovak cities: Bratislava, Kosice, and Poprad.

After the breakup of the Czechoslovak Federation in 1992, the airline adopted its present name on 26 March 1995. By the late 1990s, most of its Soviet aircraft had either been sold to other airlines or retired (a number were preserved), replaced with Western models such as the Boeing 737, Airbus A310 and Airbus A320. ČSA became a full member of the SkyTeam alliance on 18 October 2000. As of March 2007, the airline, with 5,440 employees, was owned by the Czech Ministry of Finance (56.92%), the Czech Consolidation Agency (34.59%), and other Czech institutions.

On 1 January 2010, the whole non-office ground staff of ČSA was transferred to the ČSA Support subsidiary, now named Czech Airlines Handling S.R.O. In February 2010, ČSA sold off its duty-free shops to another entity. EU competition regulators began an investigation into Czech Airlines on 23 February 2011, stating that it doubted the loss-making concern could return to viability and comply with European Union state aid regulations.

In late 2012, ČSA Czech Airlines announced expansion plans and the resumption of long-haul flights in summer 2013 with Airbus A330 aircraft between Prague and Seoul. Starting in March 2013, it operated direct flights from Prague to Perm, Nice, Munich, Zurich, Seoul, and Florence.

After stock sales to Korean Air on 10 April 2013, ČSA Czech Airlines was owned by Czech Aeroholdings a.s. (56%) and Korean Air Lines Co., Ltd. (44%). On 14 May 2013, Czech Airlines Extraordinary General shareholders' meeting elected Cho Won-tae as a new member of its supervisory board. Cho replaced Petr Matousek, who resigned from his position on the supervisory board. This personnel change took effect on 1 June 2013 as a result of Korean Air's equity purchase.

In 2014, the airline sold its Airbus 320s, as it had become unprofitable to fly them due to low load factor and high maintenance costs. In the summer of 2015, the fleet consisted of seventeen planes: seven Turboprops, nine Airbus A319s, and one long-haul Airbus A330 that was leased to the airline by Korean Air.

=== Erosion under Smartwings ===
In April 2015, Travel Service Group bought 34% of the airline, with Korean Air not exercising their first-preference option for the stake. On 6 October 2017, Korean Air announced the sale of its 44% stake, which it had held for four years, to Travel Service. Travel Service by then owned 78.9% of ČSA. Czech state company Prisko owned 20% of ČSA. Travel Service later also acquired Prisko's stake, increasing its stake to 97.74%. The remaining 2.26% of ČSA was owned by insurance company Česká Pojišťovna.

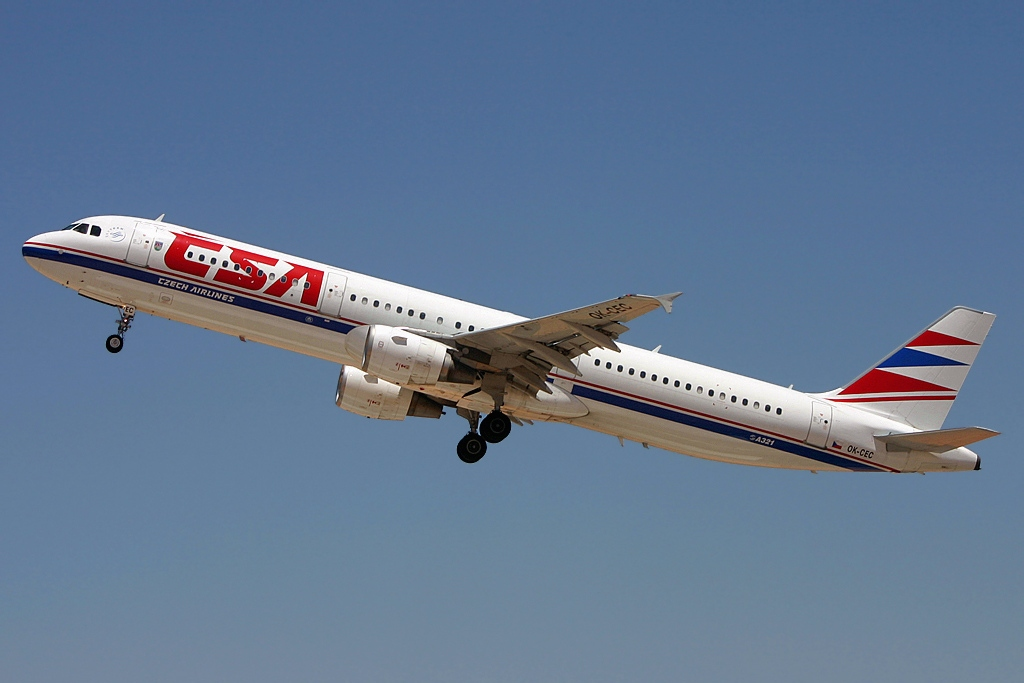
Airbus A321-200

In 2016, the airline returned to profit for the first time in several years transporting 2.26 million passengers, a 13% increase from 2015. The average load factor increased from 10% to 75%, and the total number of flights increased by 9%. In the same year, it placed an order for six new A320neo models. The airline operated a fleet of eighteen planes over the summer of 2017 to a total of fifty different destinations, including twenty-five distinct European and Asian countries, the most extensive coverage since the 2008 financial crisis.

From the fall of 2018 through the winter of 2019, the Smartwings Group management eliminated many airline routes, including the Prague-Bratislava and Prague-Ostrava routes that the airline has been flying since its inception. Soon after, profitable routes into select Russian cities were eliminated and immediately replaced by new routes operated by Smartwings. Under the leadership of the Smartwings Group, the Czech Airline's fleet was planned to be transformed into a fully integrated Boeing 737 fleet, the same model that the Smartwings fleet used. However, due to technical and safety issues in the Boeing 737 MAX model found in early 2019, management decided to operate the ongoing Airbus fleet. In March 2019, Smartwings announced that ČSA would undergo a fleet transition, with the Airbus A319 and ATR 72 to be retired. In April 2019, the fleet experienced a reduction of three out of the four operating Airbus A319s. However, one of these was later reintroduced.

The A320neo order was halved to three planes in 2019, and then converted into three orders for the Airbus A321XLR model instead at the beginning of 2020, with plans to launch North American routes. Manufacturer Airbus planned to deliver the planes in 2023 and 2024. However, the airline cancelled the order due to the COVID-19 pandemic.

In the wake of the COVID-19 pandemic, Czech Airlines announced in April 2020 the end of its already suspended sole long-haul route to Seoul. Thus, its sole Airbus A330 was to be returned to lessor Korean Air by October 2020. ČSA fell into insolvency, applying for a moratorium in August 2020. The company's workforce declined from 700 to 300 employees, and by the end of the year, the active fleet declined from five planes to two, both of which were under lease, flying to only five European destinations. In February 2021, a maintenance provider ordered the seizure of two Czech Airlines' ATR 72-500 in Prague over unpaid debts. Before the incident, near the end of the moratorium, owners announced that Czech Airlines faced insolvency should it not receive state financial aid, but the aid raised controversy. That same month, the airline notified the Czech Employment Office that it might lay off its entire workforce of some 430 people. In March 2021, it added that it had no means to meet its financial obligations and filed for bankruptcy.

In March 2021, ČSA announced the immediate retirement of all ATR 72-500 aircraft. At the end of August 2021, ČSA was operating just one Airbus A320 aircraft; the second was inoperable. As of summer 2022, Czech Airlines had reduced its network to just three scheduled routes.

==== "Reverse takeover" of Smartwings and the final flight ====
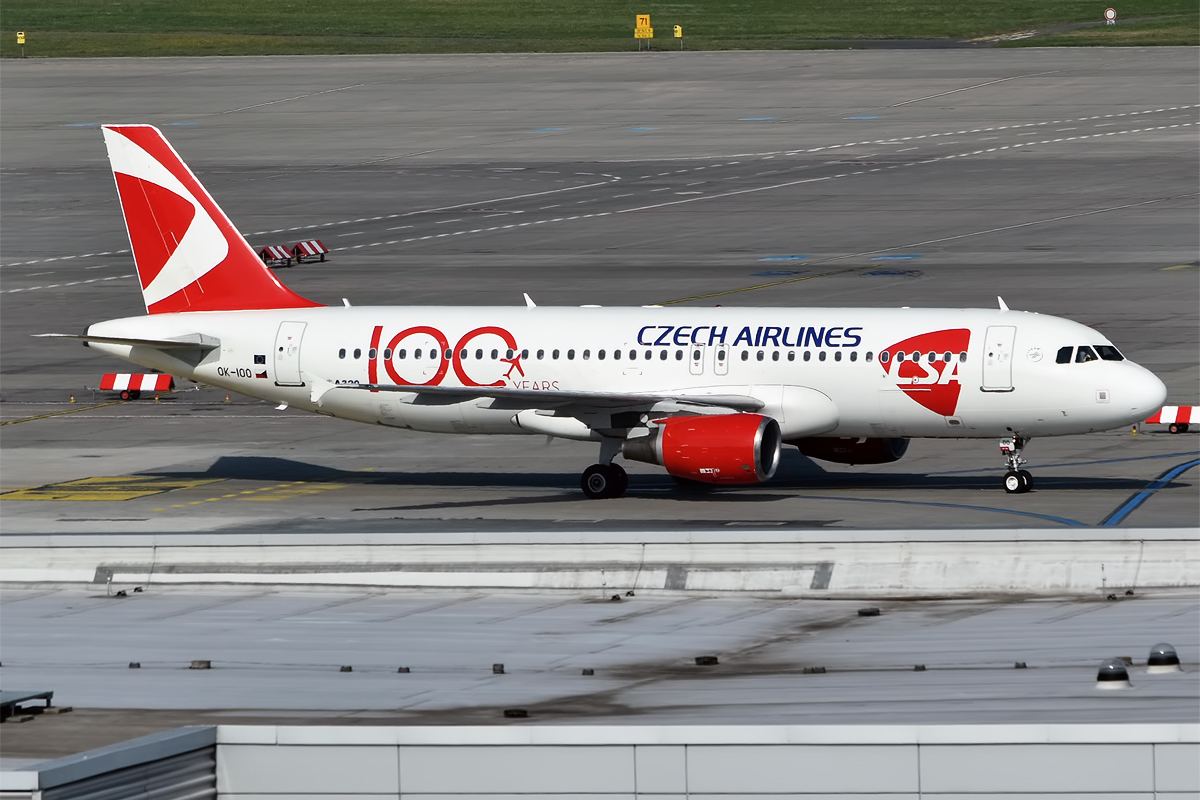
OK-IOO, the Airbus A320 which operated for final flight

In June 2022, ČSA exited business restructuring under a new ownership structure. Prague City Air, founded under the aid of Smartwings shareholders Jiří Šimáně and Roman Vik, was created to own 70% of ČSA while current majority shareholder Smartwings retained 30%. As of late 2022, the airline also planned to rebuild its fleet and route network using Airbus A320 and newly acquired Airbus A220 aircraft. Since 2023, the only remaining route operated by Czech Airlines was Prague-Paris.

On 20 February 2024, Prague City Air s.r.o. purchased 49.92% shares in Smartwings a.s. from Rainbow Wisdom Investment Limited. Smartwings spokeswoman Vladimíra Dufková announced that the Czech shareholders now own 100% of the shares in both Smartwings and CSA Czech Airlines.

In October 2024, Czech Airlines was restructured into a holding company, with Smartwings taking over all flight operations under both brand names. The Czech Airlines brand remains active, with two Airbus A320 and four later delivered Airbus A220 aircraft dedicated to operate in its livery.

On 26 October, the last flight of ČSA took place, as it took off in the evening from Charles de Gaulle Airport in Paris to Prague Václav Havel Airport. This was the last flight under what has become to be known as its iconic "OK" flight call. Following the flight's departure, "Featured flight alert" notifications were sent out to users of the ADS-B flight tracker Flightradar24 application.

=== Purchase by Pegasus ===
In winter of 2025, LOT Polish Airlines offered to acquire the entire holding, following a prolonged interest. However, a better last minute bid worth €154 million by Pegasus Europe B.V., a subsidiary of Turkish carrier's Pegasus Airlines parent company Esas Holding was accepted instead in December 2025. On 11 September 2026, the acquisition was approved by the Czech regulators.

== Corporate affairs ==
=== Head office ===
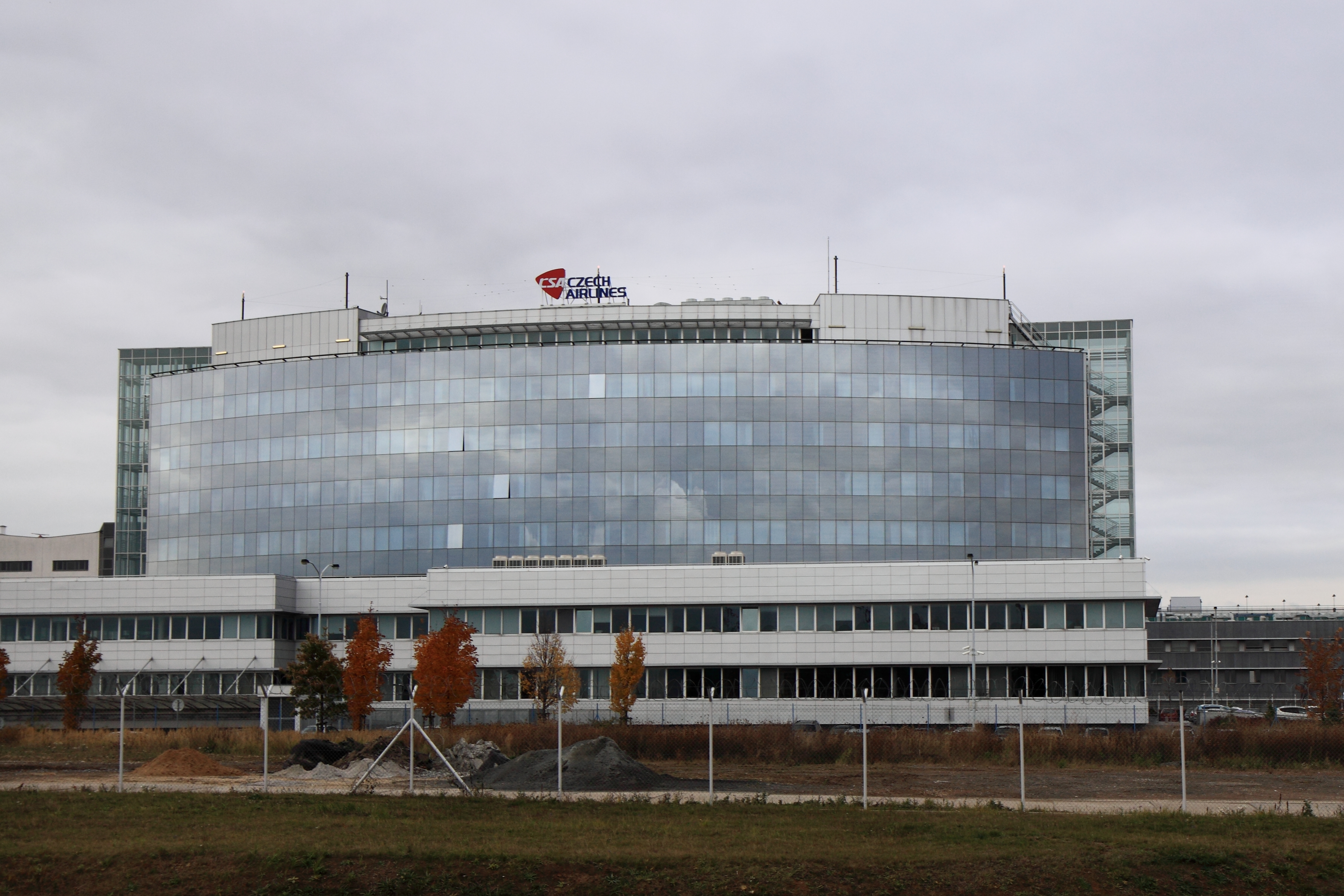
Headquarters at Ruzyne

In 2016, the Czech Airlines head office moved to Evropská Street in 6th district, Prague, Vokovice district to lower overhead. Czech Airlines formerly had its head office, the APC Building, on the grounds of Václav Havel Airport Prague in Ruzyně, 6th district, Prague. On 30 December 2009, ČSA announced it would sell its head office to the airport for CZK 607 million. Before the insolvency application, in February 2021, Czech Airlines moved its headquarters to the Smartwings building at Prague airport.

=== Former subsidiaries ===
- Czech Airlines Handling provided ground handling or passenger and aircraft handling for many airlines operating flights from Prague.
- Czech Airlines Technics provided aircraft maintenance and regular certified servicing for the Czech Airlines fleet and other airlines.

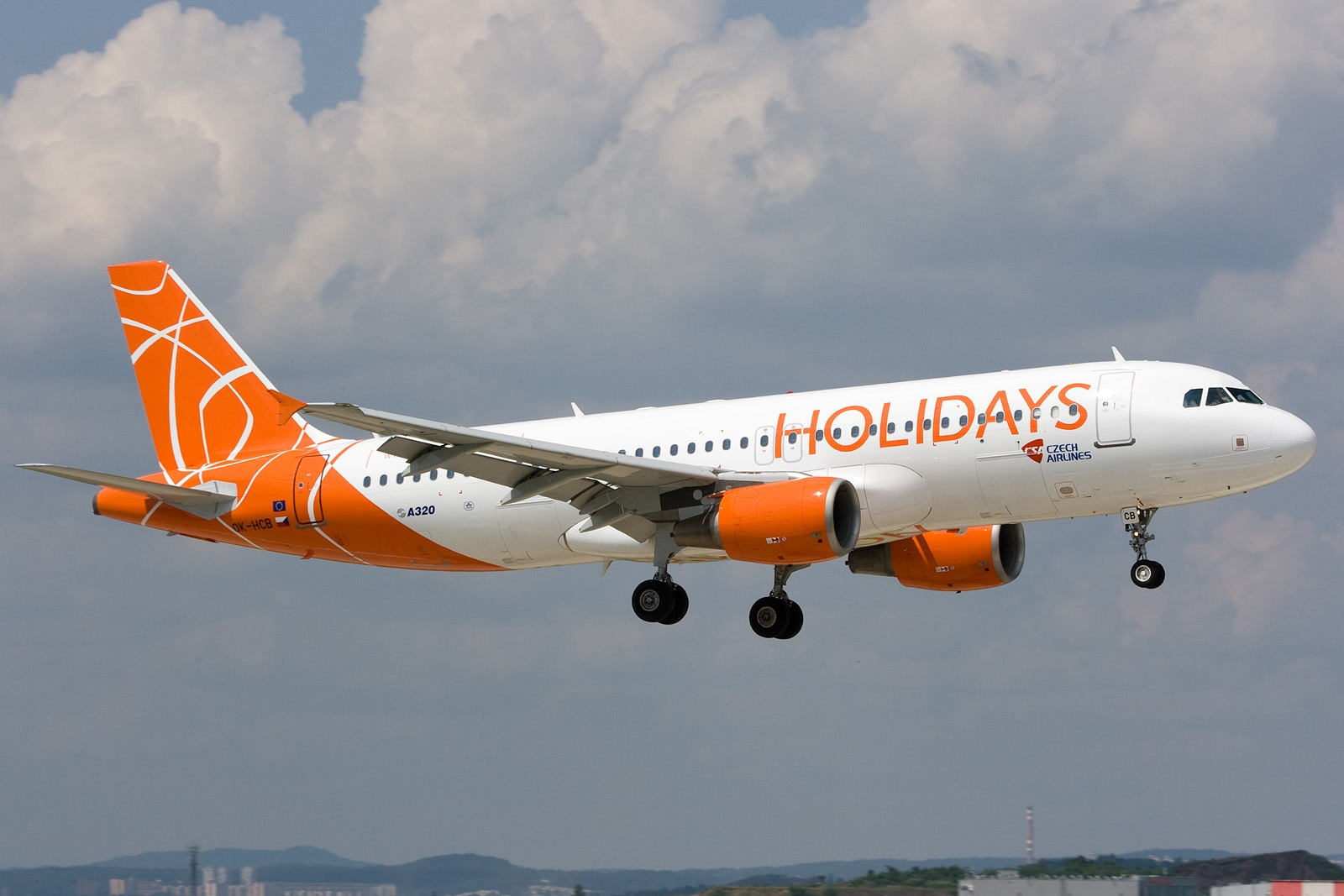
An Airbus A320-200 of Holidays Czech Airlines

- Czech Aviation Training Centre provided training to future aircrew members, as well as refresher and further training to existing crews operated by the state-owned enterprise Air Navigation Services of the Czech Republic. In addition to Czech Airlines, services of the training centre were also used by other airlines. Furthermore, "Flying without Fear" and "Stewardess/Steward Try-outs" courses were offered, as well as the "Flying for Fun" adventure course. These special events were also open to the public.
- Holidays Czech Airlines, a defunct charter subsidiary, focused mainly on flying to holiday destinations such as Greece, Turkey and Spain. The airline launched on 1 June 2010 and ceased in July 2014.

=== Financial results ===
Since its transformation to a joint-stock company in August 1992, ČSA has never paid dividends. The sale of a minority share to Air France was a fiasco, and the French airline withdrew. Subsequently, Antonín Jakubše and Miroslav Kůla stabilized the company and enlarged its fleet. In September 2003, Miroslav Kůla was fired. New CEO and ex-minister Jaroslav Tvrdík agreed with the unions to increase wages by a third and announced an "unprecedented" enlargement of the fleet.

In 2005, the financial situation sharply deteriorated. Although the sale of two ATR aircraft improved operating results by CZK 198 million, the operating loss was almost half a billion Czech crowns and the Government of Jiří Paroubek replaced Jaroslav Tvrdík with Radomír Lašák. The airline generated further operating losses, despite revenues of CZK 2.1 bn from the sale of almost all real estate and CZK 1.2 bn from aircraft sales. In 2005–2010, ČSA generated an operating loss of CZK 3.4 bn; without long-term asset sale revenues, the operating loss would have been twice as large. The gross margin did not even cover personnel expenses.

In 2016, the airline handled 2.7 million passengers and announced a net profit of 241 million crowns.

Consolidated financial results of České aerolinie a.s. in 2005–2014
billion CZK	2005	2006	2007	2008	2009	2010	2011	2012	2013	2014	2005–14
Sales	21.5	24.0	24.0	23.2	20.4	16.9	14.8	13.7	10.2	9.5	178.2
Cost of sales	(18.3)	(18.6)	(18.7)	(18.7)	(18.1)	(14.3)	(12.8)	(12.1)	(10.0)	(8.8)	(150.4)
Gross margin	3.2	5.4	5.4	4.5	2.2	2.6	2.1	1.5	0.2	0.7	27.8
Personnel cost	(4.1)	(4.5)	(4.8)	(4.8)	(4.9)	(3.9)	(3.3)	(1.5)	(1.3)	(1.2)	(34.3)
Disposals of LT assets	0.2	0.2	0.6	1.4	0.4	0.8	0.3	(0.2)	0.1	0.0	3.8
Reserves	0.3	(0.5)	(0,1)	0.3	(0.6)	0.5	0.1	1.1	0.2	(0.1)	1.1
Other (depreciation etc.)	(0.0)	(0.8)	(0.7)	(0.6)	(0.7)	(0.3)	(0.4)	(0.1)	(0.1)	(0.0)	(3.7)
Operating profit	(0.5)	(0.2)	0.5	0.7	(3.5)	(0.3)	(1.1)	0.8	(1.0)	(0.6)	(5.4)

=== Corporate identity ===
==== Logo ====
A new look was revealed in September 2007. The new logo was created by Michal Kotyza, who works for the airline.

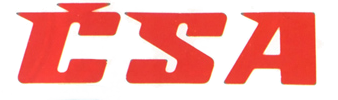
early 1960s–1993

1993–2007

2007–2024

==== Livery ====
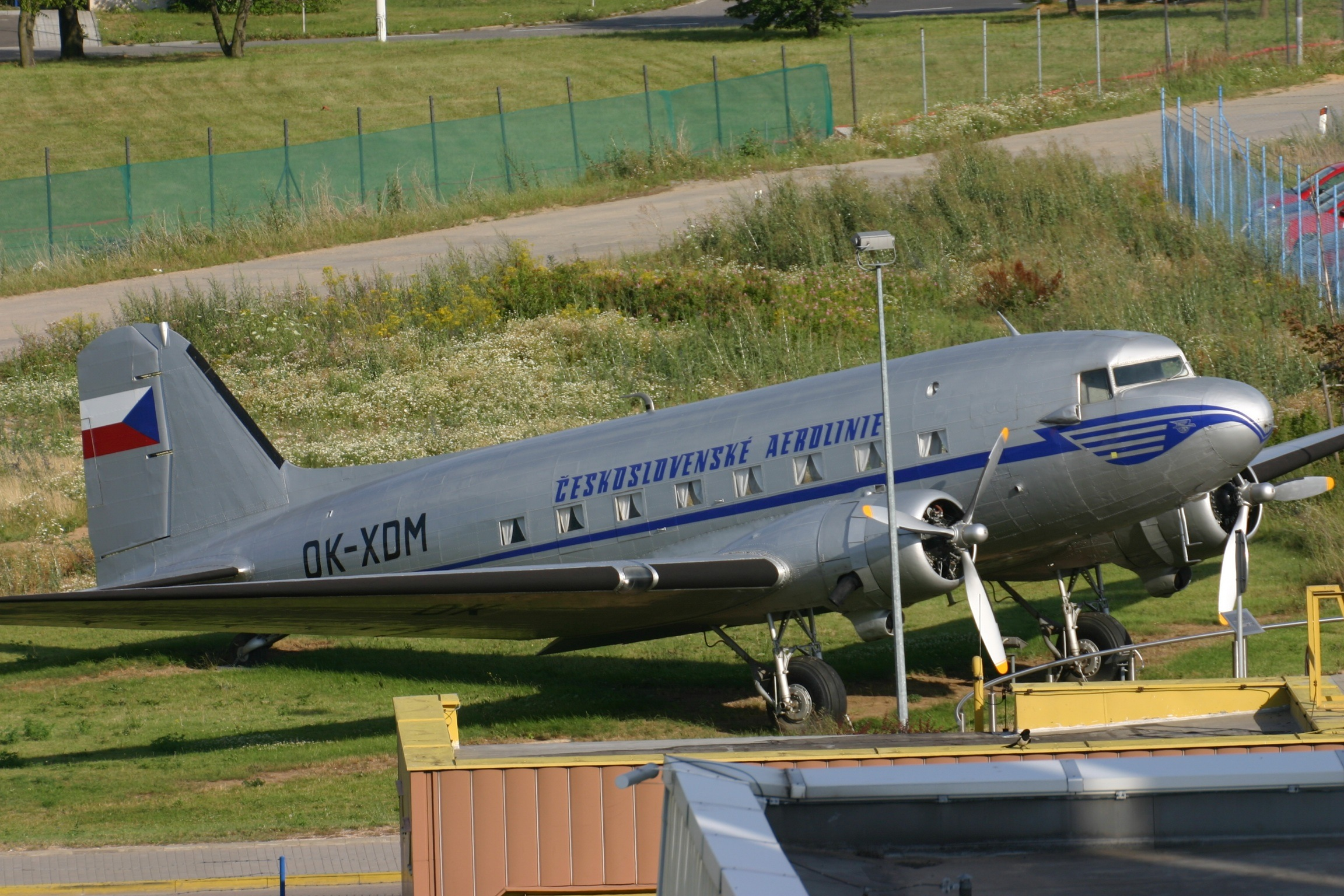
1945-1960s: a feathered-wing-like blue branched line on all-silver fuselage and "wind-swept" serifs

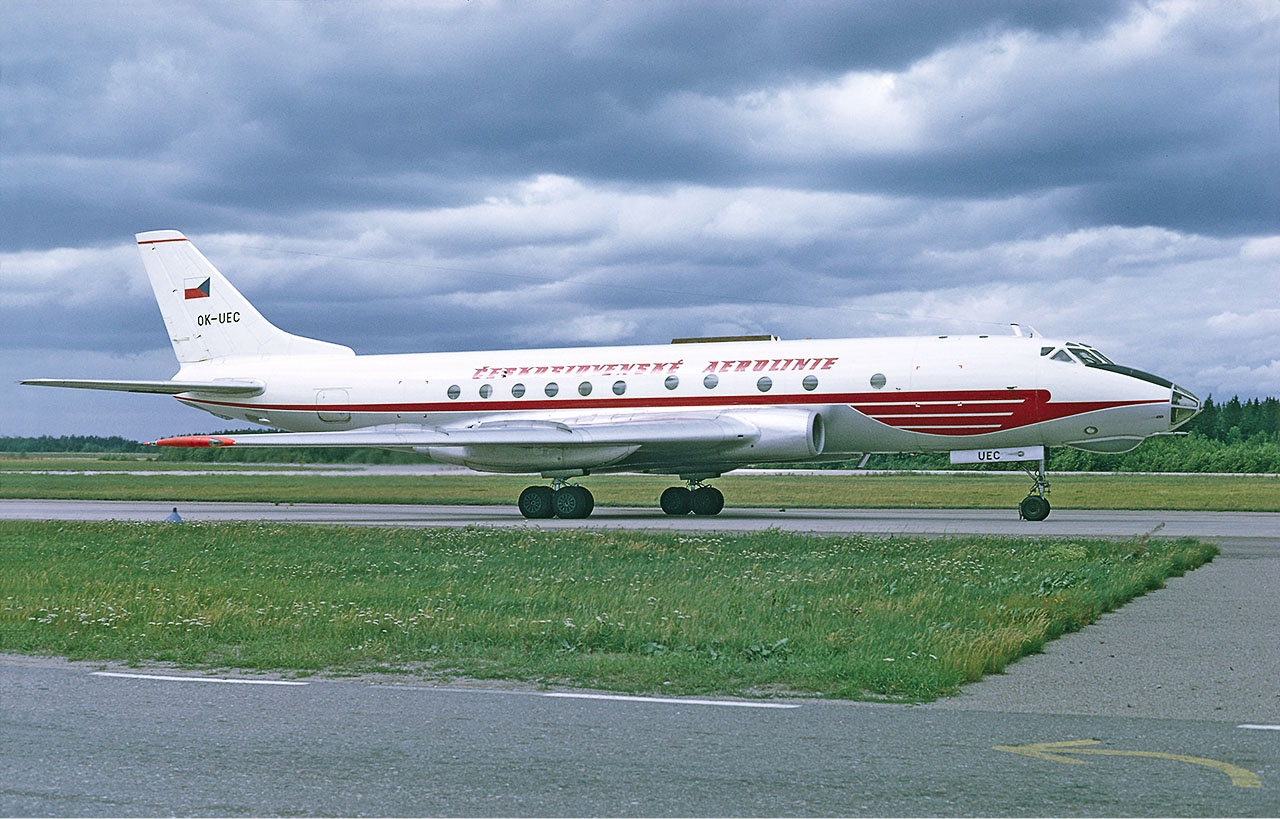
1960s–1975: a feathered-wing-like red branched line on white upper fuselage and "wind-swept" serifs

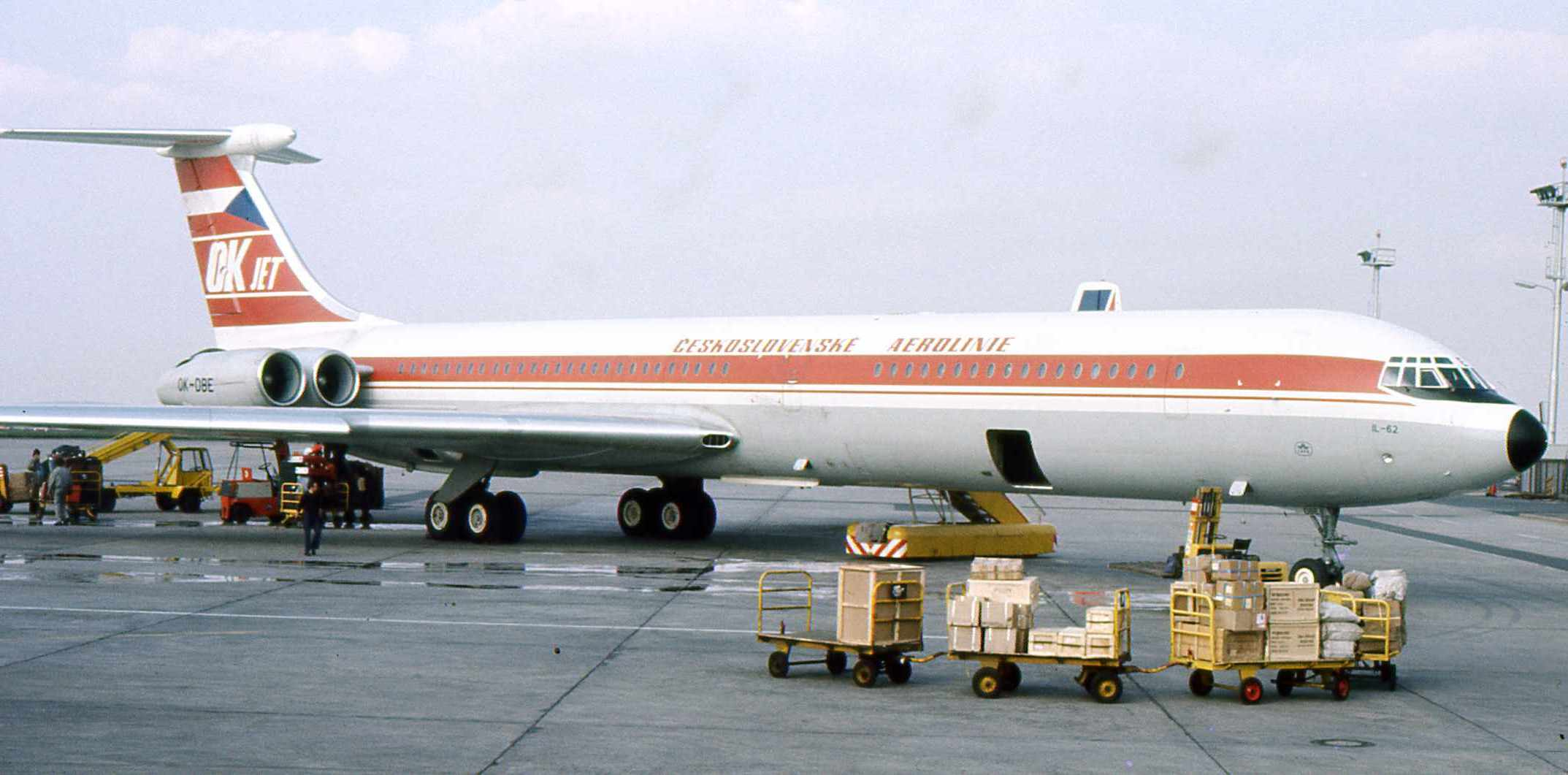
1975–1990s: a red line along windows and OK (JET) prominent on tail

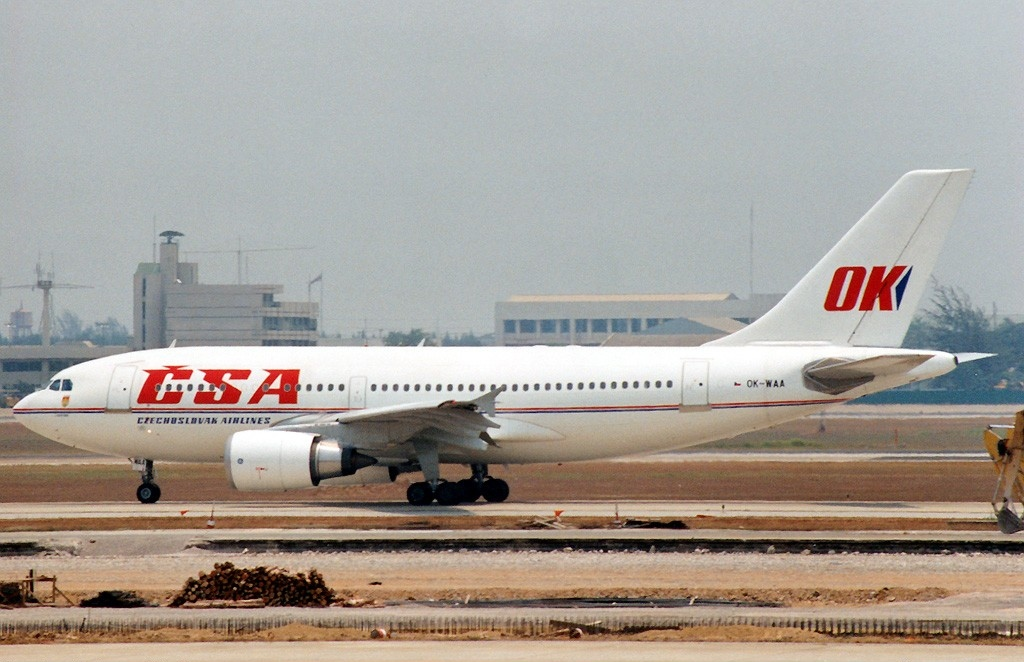
1990s variation: two small red and blue lines below windows line, CSA large titles close to cockpit windows and OK (JET) prominent on tail

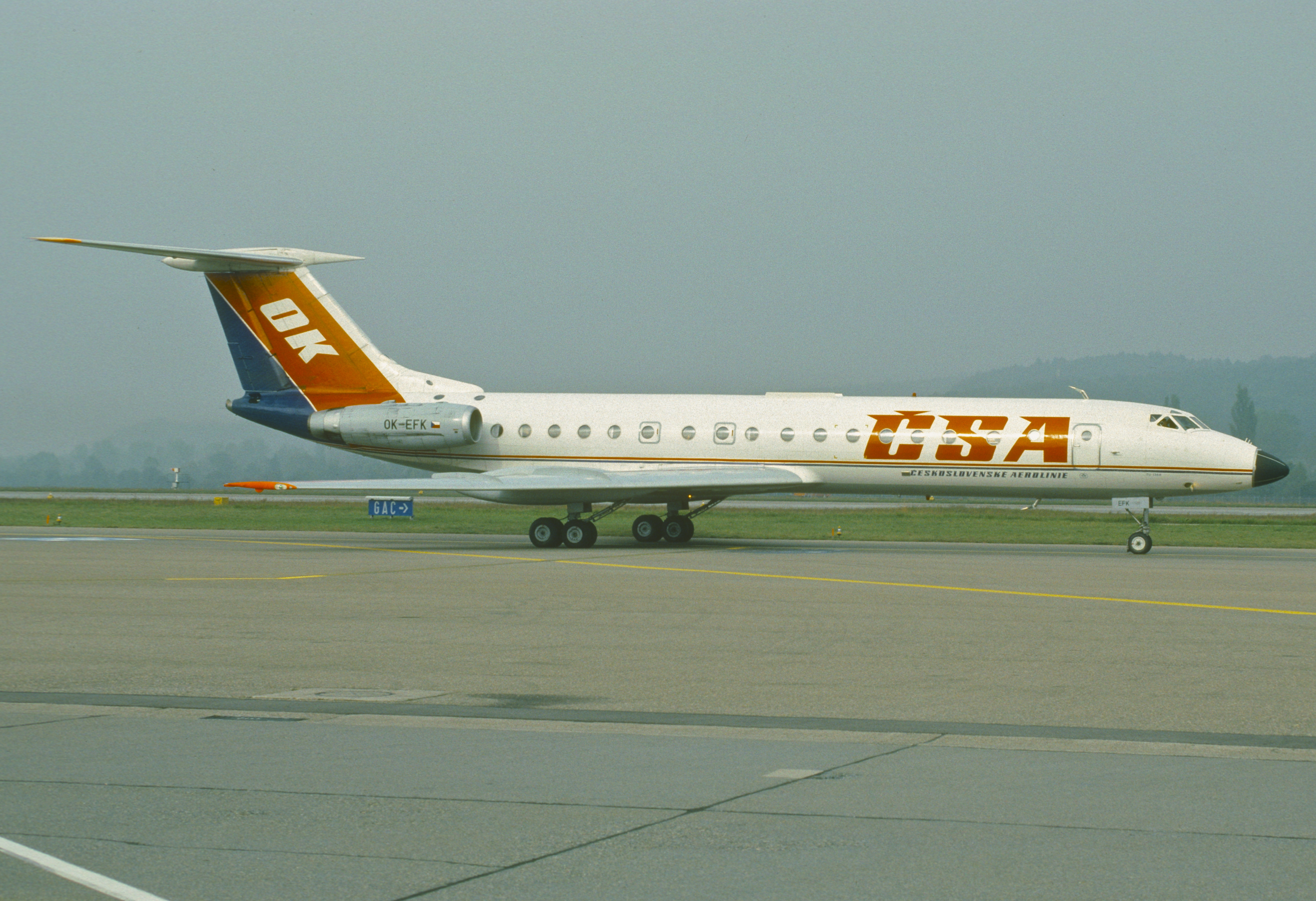
early 1990s variation for Soviet-manufactured aircraft: CSA large titles close to cockpit windows, white OK prominent on red tail and two small red and blue lines below windows line

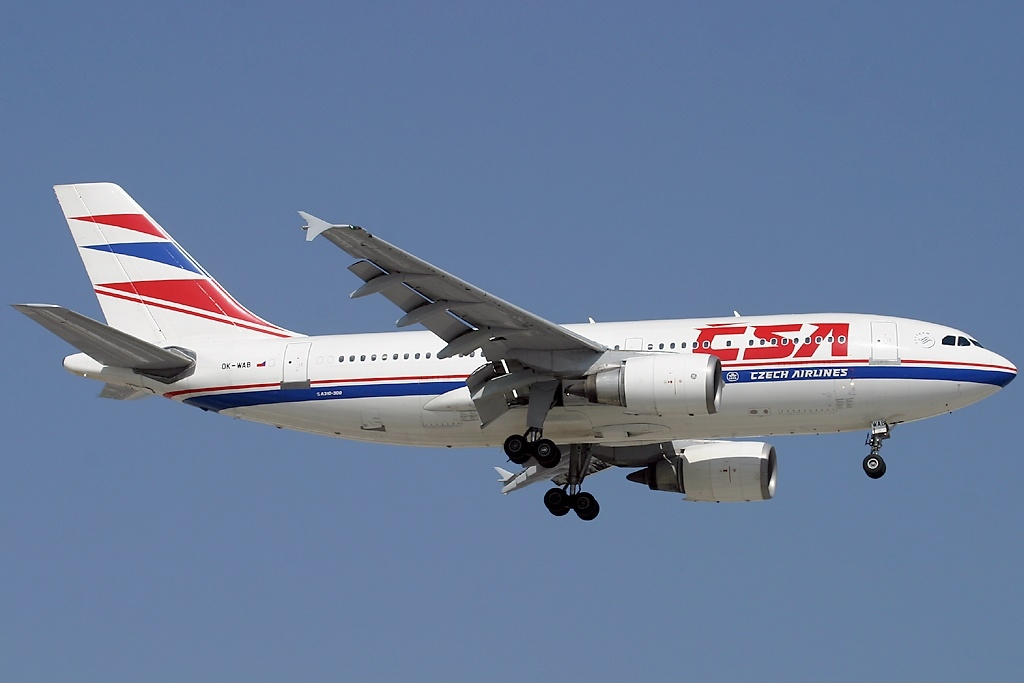
1993–2007: large abbreviation, blue line added, triangles on tail

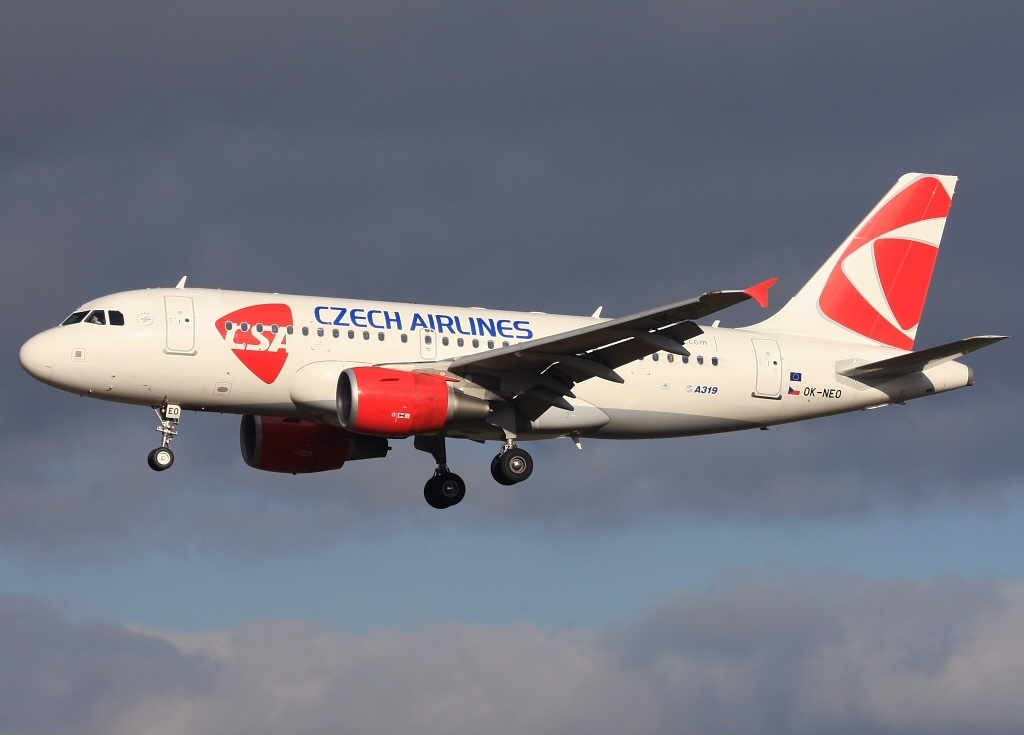
since 2007: a rounded triangle

=== On-board services ===
Czech Airlines offered buy on board service on some flights in addition to free service.

=== Frequent-flyer program ===
The OK Plus frequent flyer programme gave passengers "OK Plus Miles" for flights with Czech Airlines, SkyTeam member airlines, other partner airlines or non-airline partners. OK Plus membership cards were available with the following tier levels: OK Plus membership, OK Plus Silver, OK Plus Gold, and OK Plus Platinum. The higher the card level, the greater the number of benefits passengers receive. CSA terminated its OK Plus program in October 2024, without implementing a replacement scheme.

== Destinations ==
=== Scheduled flights ===
As of February 2021, Czech Airlines served four scheduled year-round and seasonal destinations including their home base at Václav Havel Airport Prague. This figure was down from 33 routes in summer 2019. Flights were operated mainly in Europe, with Beirut being the sole remaining Middle Eastern destination. ČSA offered more than 110 destinations and 45 countries from Prague, but none of the long-haul service via its codeshare partners.

As of October 2024, routes to Paris and Madrid are operated by Smartwings under the Czech Airlines brand using two Airbus A320 aircraft in Czech Airlines livery.

=== Charter flights ===
In June 2007, ČSA signed a contract with Exim Tours, the largest Czech travel agency, extending their contract for another three years. In May 2010, ČSA withdrew its last Airbus A310 used for these services.

=== Codeshare agreements ===
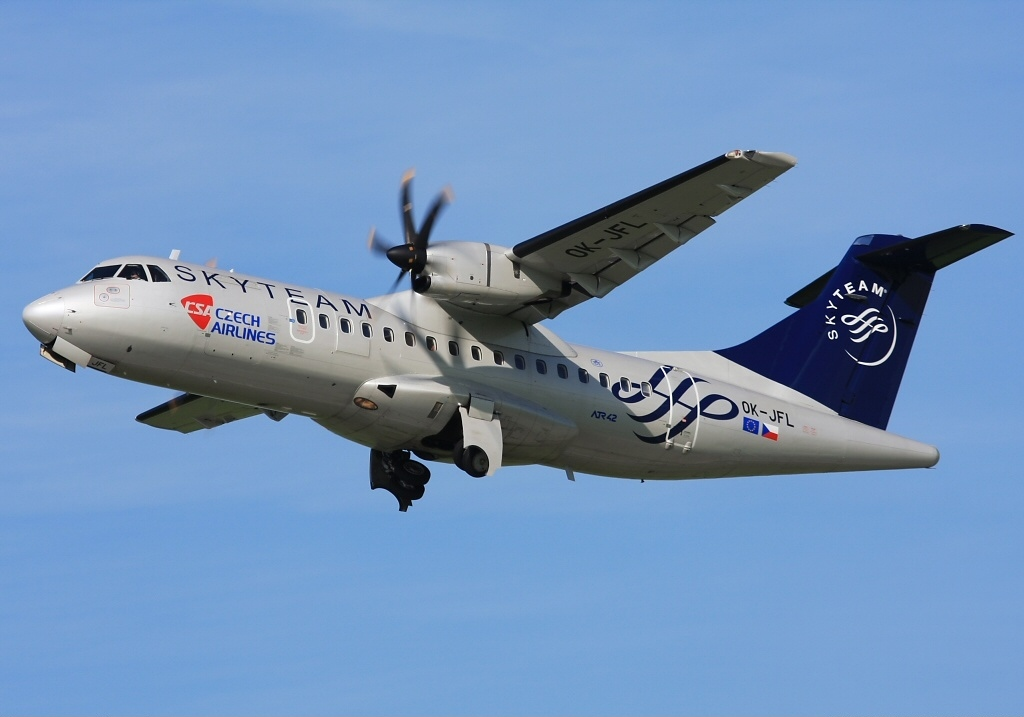
ATR 42-500 in SkyTeam colors

Czech Airlines had codeshares with the following airlines:

- Aeroflot
- Aeroméxico
- Air Europa
- Air France
- airBaltic
- Azerbaijan Airlines
- Belavia
- Bulgaria Air
- China Airlines
- China Southern Airlines
- Delta Air Lines
- Etihad Airways
- Finnair
- Hainan Airlines
- Iberia
- KLM
- Korean Air
- Middle East Airlines
- Saudia
- TAROM
- Smartwings
- Ural Airlines
- Vietnam Airlines
- Vueling

== Fleet ==
=== Current fleet ===
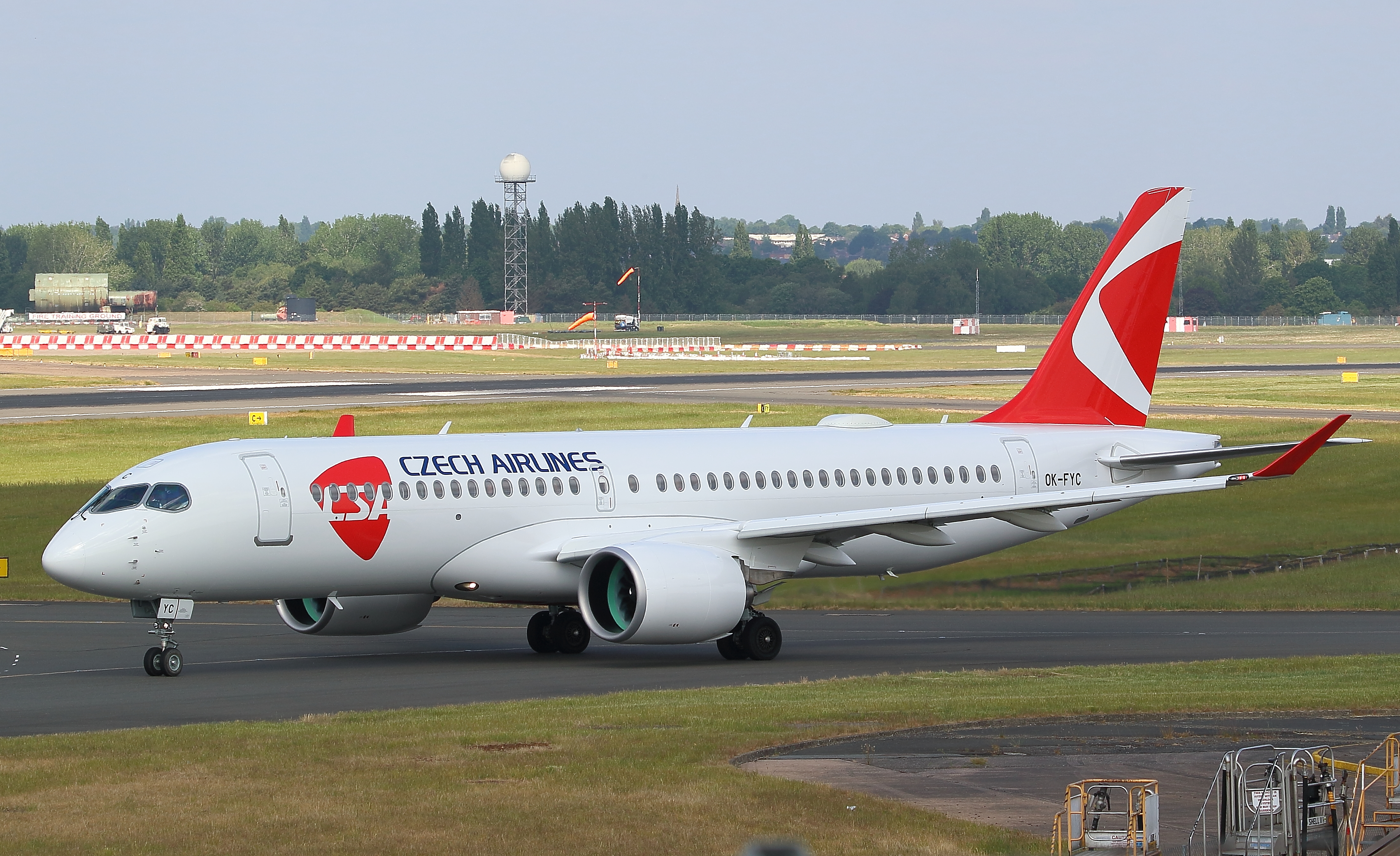
Airbus A220-300 operated by Smartwings

As of June 2025, the Czech Airlines-branded fleet consists of the following aircraft:

Aircraft	In service	Orders	Passengers	Notes
Airbus A220-300	4	—	149	Operated by Smartwings.
Airbus A320-200	2	—	180	Operated by Smartwings.
Total	6	—		

The entire fleet of Czech Airlines-branded Airbus aircraft is operated by Smartwings, an airline which owns Czech Airlines.

=== Historical fleet ===
Czech or Czechoslovak Airlines operated these aircraft types in the past:

Aircraft	Total	Introduced	Retired	Notes
Aero A.10	5	1923	1924	
Aero A.14 Brandenburg	3	1923	1927	
Airbus A310-300	4	1991	2010	
Airbus A319-100	9	2007	2022	
Airbus A320-200	9	2005	2015	
Airbus A321-200	3	2005	2018	
Airbus A330-300	1	2013	2020	Leased from Korean Air.
ATR 42-300	5	1994	2011	
ATR 42-400	2	1996	2005	
ATR 42-500	7	2004	2018	
ATR 72-200	5	1992	2015	
ATR 72-500	7	2012	2021	
Boeing 737-400	15	1995	2016	
Boeing 737-500	15	1992	2008	
Boeing 737-800	1	2018	2020	Leased from Smartwings.
Bristol Britannia	2	1962	1969	Leased from Cubana de Aviación.
Douglas DC-3	7	1946	1956	
de Havilland DH.50	8	1925	1930	
Avia F-VIIb-3m	6	1936	1939	
Ford Trimotor	1	1929	1930	
Ilyushin Il-12	10	1949	1959	
Avia Il-14	32	1957	1977	
Ilyushin Il-18	18	1960	1990	
Ilyushin Il-62	9	1969	1995	
Ilyushin Il-62M	6	1969	1995	
Junkers Ju 352	1	Unknown	Unknown	
Junkers Ju 52	5	1946	1948	
Let L-200 Morava	20	1958	1969	
Let L-410 Turbolet	12	1976	1981	
Let L-410M Turbolet	12	1976	1981	
Lisunov Li-2	8	1949	1957	
Saab 340B	2	2008	2010	Operated by Central Connect Airlines.
Saro Cloud	1	1935	1938	
Savoia-Marchetti S.73	6	1937	1940	
Tupolev Tu-104A	6	1957	1973	
Tupolev Tu-124	3	1964	1972	
Tupolev Tu-134A	14	1971	1997	
Tupolev Tu-154M	7	1988	1999	
Yakovlev Yak-40	5	1974	1992	

== Accidents and incidents ==
=== Fatal accidents ===
- On 12 August 1930, a ČSA Ford 5-AT-C Trimotor (registration OK-FOR) crashed near Jihlava (Iglau) while attempting to avoid a thunderstorm. The aircraft struck the ground in poor visibility after a sharp turn to avoid a chimney and caught fire, killing 12 of 13 on board.
- On 13 August 1938, a ČSA Savoia-Marchetti S.73 (registration OK-BAG) struck a wooded mountain near Oberkirch on approach to Strasbourg en route from Prague via Paris, killing all 17 on board, the stewardess survived, but died a day later.
- On 5 March 1946, a ČSA Junkers Ju 52/3m (registration OK-ZDN) crashed near Prague after two landing attempts, killing 10 of 15 on board. The aircraft was operating a Paris-Strasbourg-Prague passenger service.
- On 13 February 1947, a ČSA Douglas C-47A (registration OK-XDU) crashed shortly after takeoff from Ruzyne Airport while on a training flight, killing all three on board; improper maintenance was blamed, leading to a five-day crew strike.
- On 21 December 1948, ČSA Flight 584 (a Douglas C-47A, registration OK-WDN) struck a hillside near Pilos, Greece in bad weather, killing all 24 on board. Other reports state the aircraft was shot down after the pilot lit a flare or crashed into the hill while dropping weapons for communist insurgents. The aircraft was operating a passenger service from Czechoslovakia to Israel with stops at Rome and Athens.
- On 27 February 1950, a ČSA Douglas C-47A (registration OK-WDY) struck Praded Mountain en route to Prague from Ostrava, killing six of 25 on board.
- On 12 January 1954, a ČSA Douglas C-47A (registration OK-WDS) struck a chimney and power lines and crashed near Prague after nearly failing to take off, killing all 13 on board.
- On 18 January 1956, a ČSA Douglas C-47A (registration OK-WDZ) struck Mount Skapova after the aircraft was blown off course by strong winds, killing 22 of 26 on board.
- On 24 November 1956, a ČSA Ilyushin Il-12 (registration OK-DBP) crashed into a field near Egislau, Switzerland, killing all 23 on board.
- On 2 January 1961, a ČSA Avia 14 (registration OK-MCZ) crashed on a climb out from Prague during a pilot training flight after failing to gain height on takeoff, killing all 10 on board.
- On 28 March 1961, ČSA Flight 511 (an Ilyushin Il-18V) crashed in Gräfenberg near Nürnberg during a Prague-Zurich service due to structural failure, killing all 52 on board.
- On 12 July 1961, ČSA Flight 511 (an Ilyushin Il-18V, registration OK-PAF) crashed near Anfa Airport due to a possible crew error, killing all 72 on board.
- On 10 October 1962, ČSA Flight 306 (an Avia 14, registration OK-MCT) crashed near Slavkov while on approach to Brno, killing 13 of 42 on board.
- On 5 September 1967, ČSA Flight 523, an Ilyushin Il-18D (registration OK-WAI), crashed on climbout from Gander International Airport while on a Prague-Shannon-Gander-Havana passenger service, killing 37 of 69 on board; the cause was never determined.
- On 11 October 1968, a ČSA Avia 14-32A (registration OK-MCJ, named Svit Gottwaldov) crashed near Ptice shortly after takeoff from Prague, killing 11 of 40 on board.
- On 1 June 1970, a ČSA Tupolev Tu-104A (registration OK-NDD, named Plzen) crashed after two attempted approaches to Tripoli International Airport, killing all 13 on board.
- On 20 August 1975 ČSA Flight 540, an Ilyushin Il-62 (registration OK-DBF, named Brno Trade Fair) flew into the ground during a night-time approach to Damascus International Airport due to a misunderstanding between the pilots and the control tower that resulted in an incorrect altimeter setting, killing 126 of 128 on board in Syria's worst ever air disaster.
- On 28 July 1976, ČSA Flight 001, an Ilyushin Il-18V (registration OK-NAB, named Košice), which was operating as a scheduled domestic passenger flight from Prague's Ruzyně airport to Bratislava-Ivanka Airport, both in Czechoslovakia, crashed into the Zlaté Piesky (Golden Sands) lake while attempting to land in Bratislava. All 6 crew members and 70 out of 73 passengers died.
- On 11 February 1977, ČSA Flight 475, an Avia 14T (registration OK-OCA), struck trees and crashed near Ivanka Airport due to crew error, killing four of five on board. This is ČSA's last fatal accident.

=== Non-fatal accidents ===
- On 9 November 1946, a ČSA Douglas C-47A (registration OK-XDG) force-landed near Dobrovíz after running out of fuel while in a holding pattern due to bad weather; all 18 on board survived, but the aircraft was written off.
- On 24 December 1946, a ČSA Douglas C-47A (registration OK-WDD) was written off following an emergency landing near Paris; all 15 on board survived.
- On 25 January 1947, a ČSA Douglas C-47A (registration OK-WDB) was struck by a crashing Douglas Dakota while parked at Croydon Airport; there were no casualties, but the aircraft was written off. See 1947 Croydon Dakota accident.
- On 16 March 1963, a ČSA Tupolev Tu-104A (registration OK-LDB) caught fire and burned out while being refuelled at Santa Cruz Airport, India; no casualties except for a flight attendant who was injured after jumping from the plane.
- On 18 August 1970, ČSA Flight 744, a Tupolev Tu-124V (registration OK-TEB, named Centrotex), landed wheels-up at Kloten Airport after the crew became preoccupied with cabin pressurization problems; all 20 on board survived, but the aircraft was written off.
- On 29 August 1973, ČSA Flight 531, a Tupolev Tu-104A (registration OK-MDE) slid off the runway while landing at Nicosia Airport; all 70 on board survived, but the aircraft was written off.
- On 2 January 1977, ČSA Flight 897, a Tupolev Tu-134A (registration OK-CFD) collided on the runway at Ruzyne Airport with a ČSA Ilyushin Il-18 (OK-NAA) that was taking off; all 49 on board the Tu-134 survived, but it was written off; the Il-18 (all 15 on board survived) was substantially damaged but was repaired and returned to service, it was retired in 1981 and is now in a museum.
- On 11 October 1988, a ČSA Tupolev Tu-134A (registration OK-AFB) landed hard at Ruzyne Airport; there were no casualties, but the aircraft was written off and flown to Piešťany where it served as a restaurant.
- On 9 June 2012, a Czech Airlines ATR 42-500 (registration OK-KFM) was destroyed in a hangar explosion and fire at Ruzyne International Airport. A second ATR 42 (OK-JFK) was also damaged by the fire. Two Czech Airlines Technics employees were working with an explosive liquid. The liquid was sucked into a heavy technic vehicle, which then blew up near the aircraft and caused the fire.

=== Hijackings ===
- On 6 April 1948, a ČSA Douglas DC-3 was hijacked to Neubiberg Air Base, American occupation zone in Germany, by 20 people wishing to escape Communist rule in Czechoslovakia.
- On 24 March 1950, three Douglas DC-3s from Czechoslovakia were simultaneously hijacked. All three aircraft landed at the US Air Force Base at Erding, West Germany. In all, 26 of 85 passengers chose to stay in West Germany to escape Communist rule in Czechoslovakia.
- On 23 March 1952, a ČSA Douglas C-47 was hijacked by four people who demanded to be taken to Germany. The aircraft landed safely at Frankfurt with no casualties.

== See also ==
- Click4Sky

== Sources ==
- Zeman, Libor (2003). Czech Airlines 1923/2003 - For 80 years at home in the skies. Prague: Czech Airlines.
