= ČSA Flight 001 =

1976 crash in Czechoslovakia killing 73

Czechoslovak Airlines Flight 001
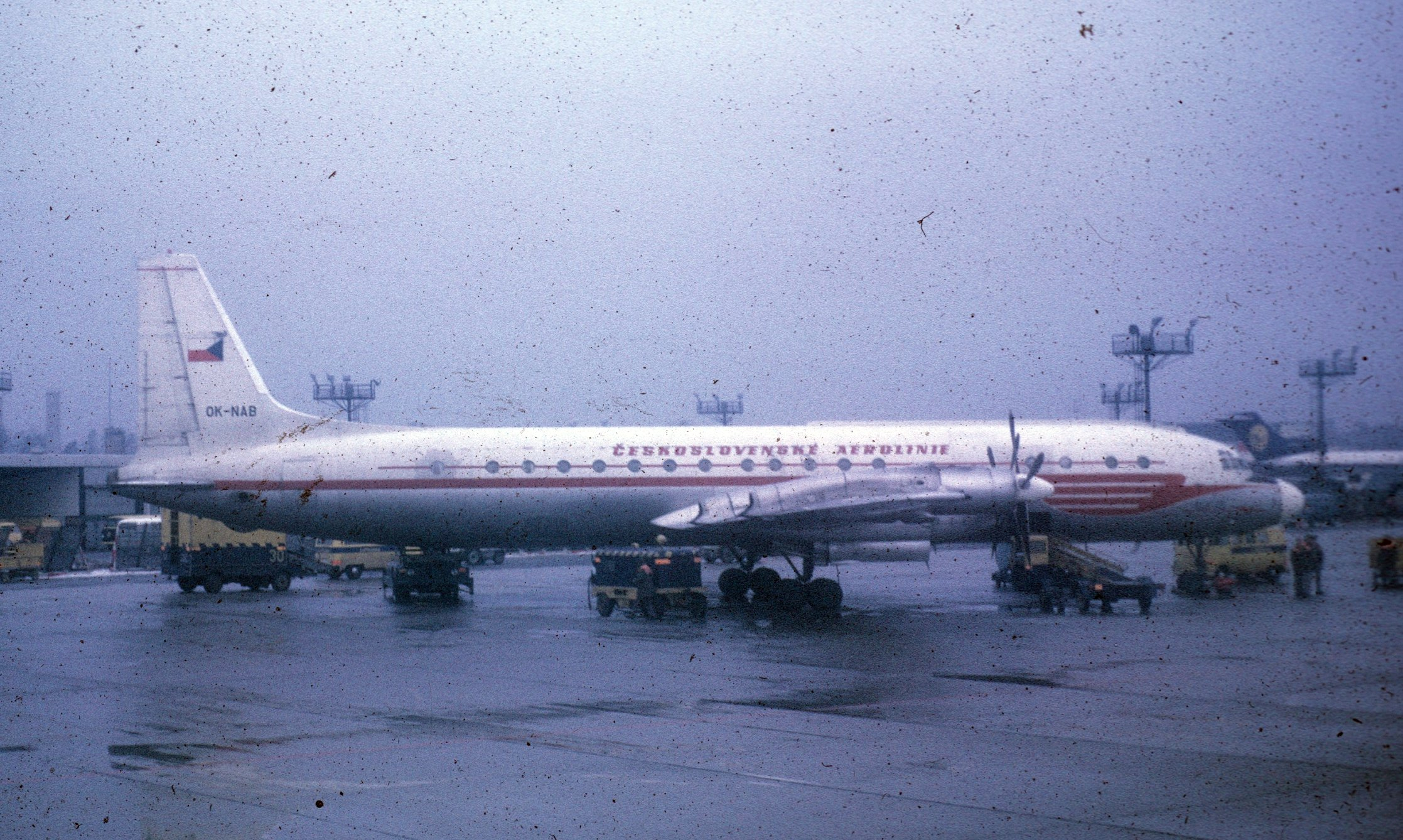
- OK-NAB, the aircraft involved in the accident, in 1970

Accident
- Date: July 28, 1976, 9:37 CEST
- Summary: Pilot error and/or technical failure
- Site: Lake Zlaté Piesky near M. R. Štefánik Airport, Bratislava, Czechoslovakia; 48°10′55″N 17°11′24″E

Aircraft
- Aircraft type: Ilyushin Il-18B
- Operator: ČSA (Československé Státní Aerolinie)
- Registration: OK-NAB
- Flight origin: Ruzyně International Airport, Prague
- Destination: M. R. Štefánik Airport, Bratislava
- Occupants: 79
- Passengers: 73
- Crew: 6
- Fatalities: 76
- Injuries: 3
- Survivors: 3

Czechoslovak Airlines Flight 001 was an Ilyushin Il-18B four engine turboprop airliner, registered OK-NAB, which was operating as a scheduled domestic passenger flight from Prague's Ruzyně airport to Bratislava-Ivanka Airport, both in Czechoslovakia, which crashed into the Zlaté Piesky (Golden Sands) Lake while attempting to land in Bratislava on July 28, 1976. All 6 crew members and 70 out of 73 passengers died.

== Crash ==
The flight departed Prague airport at 8:52 (CEST) and proceeded routinely to Bratislava. At 9:35:10 (CEST) the flight was cleared by Bratislava tower to land on runway 22. For reasons that are unclear, the crew executed a highly unstabilized ILS instrument approach to runway 22, with rates of descent as high as 4,320 fpm or 22 m/s (72 ft/s) instead of 10 m/s (33 ft/s); speeds varying from 225 to 435 km/h (140 to 270 mph) instead of 269 km/h (167 mph); and flap selection directly from 0 degree to full flaps instead of in gradual increments. As they approached the runway, the crew inadvertently set thrust reversal at the no. 2 and no. 3 engine (inboard engines) while still airborne. The thrust reversal caused the no. 3 engine to fail and the crew then inadvertently feathered the no. 4 prop, losing all thrust on the right side of the aircraft. At 50 m (160 ft) above the runway threshold the crew attempted to execute a go-around. They tried to restart the no. 4 engine at 40 m (130 ft), but the ensuing right bank due to asymmetric thrust increased; the aircraft then lost control and struck lake Zlaté Piesky (Golden Sands) in a 60 degree right bank and a 60 degree nose down attitude.

== Communications log ==
(001 – ČSA Flight 001, TWR – Bratislava air traffic control)

09:36:20
TWR: 001 Making go-around?
001: Affirmative
TWR: Roger, left turn
09:36:30
001: Roger
09:36:50
TWR: Left turn 001!
001: …… (not acknowledged)
09:37:10
001: Ono to byla štyrka ano... / It was no. 4 yes... / (accidentally broadcast)

== Investigation ==
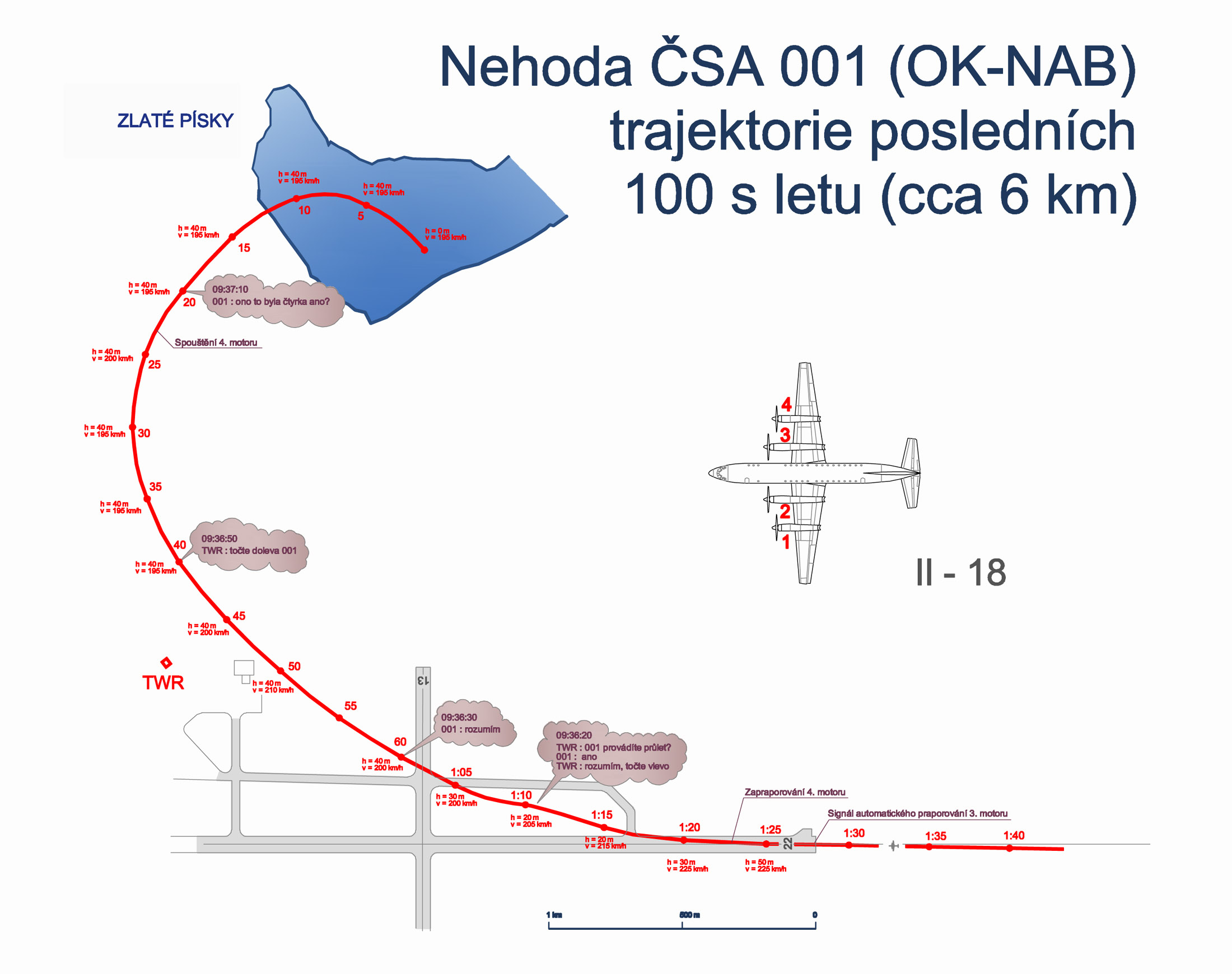
Flight path of ČSA 001 before the crash

The investigators published the causes as follows:

- Use of thrust reversal at altitude under 1,000 m (3,300 ft).
- Improper manipulation of the thrust levers of the inner engines.
- Reducing speed under the allowed limit on final approach.
- Erroneous feathering of the engine number 4 propeller.
- Failure to bank the plane towards the working engines side.
- The immediate cause was the attempt to start engine number 4 at low speed and altitude.

== Rescue operation ==
The plane crashed into a lake in a densely populated area and rescue operations started immediately after the crash. Svazarm divers tried to help, but most passengers drowned or died due to the impact forces. Initially, four passengers were pulled out alive; one passenger later died in the hospital.

== Controversy ==
A surviving passenger later claimed in an interview that flight captain requested emergency landing in Brno but it was rejected because of the Vietnamese delegation visiting the city and an emergency landing would harm the image of the country. He also claimed that Vienna airport offered an emergency landing permission but communist authorities rejected it. It is unclear how a surviving passenger would be aware of the captain's actions during the flight, or how searching for an alternate emergency landing site relates to an unstabilized approach with inadvertent thrust reversal deployment at Bratislava.

== See also ==
- List of accidents and incidents involving commercial aircraft
- TABSO Flight 101 – Ilyushin Il-18B crash at Bratislava in 1966
