= Lists of defunct airlines =

Following are lists of defunct airlines.

== Lists by continent ==
- List of defunct airlines of Africa
- List of defunct airlines of the Americas
- List of defunct airlines of Asia
- List of defunct airlines of Europe
- List of defunct airlines of Oceania

== Lists by country ==
=== A ===
- List of defunct airlines of Afghanistan
- List of defunct airlines of Albania
- List of defunct airlines of Algeria
- List of defunct airlines of Angola
- List of defunct airlines of Anguilla
- List of defunct airlines of Argentina
- List of defunct airlines of Armenia
- List of defunct airlines of Australia
- List of defunct airlines of Austria

=== B ===
- List of defunct airlines of the Bahamas
- List of defunct airlines of Bangladesh
- List of defunct airlines of Barbados
- List of defunct airlines of Belarus
- List of defunct airlines of Belgium
- List of defunct airlines of Benin
- List of defunct airlines of Bosnia and Herzegovina
- List of defunct airlines of Botswana
- List of defunct airlines of Brazil
- List of defunct airlines of Bulgaria
- List of defunct airlines of Burkina Faso
- List of defunct airlines of Burundi

=== C ===
- List of defunct airlines of Cambodia
- List of defunct airlines of Cameroon
- List of defunct airlines of Canada
- List of defunct airlines of Cape Verde
- List of defunct airlines of the Central African Republic
- List of defunct airlines of Chad
- List of defunct airlines of Chile
- List of defunct airlines of China
- List of defunct airlines of the Comoros
- List of defunct airlines of Democratic Republic of the Congo
- List of defunct airlines of the Republic of the Congo
- List of defunct airlines of Croatia
- List of defunct airlines of Cyprus
- List of defunct airlines of Czech Republic

=== D ===
- List of defunct airlines of Denmark
- List of defunct airlines of Djibouti

=== E ===
- List of defunct airlines of Egypt
- List of defunct airlines of Equatorial Guinea
- List of defunct airlines of Estonia
- List of defunct airlines of Ethiopia

=== F ===
- List of defunct airlines of Finland
- List of defunct airlines of France

=== G ===
- List of defunct airlines of Gabon
- List of defunct airlines of Georgia
- List of defunct airlines of Germany
- List of defunct airlines of Ghana
- List of defunct airlines of Greece
- List of defunct airlines of Grenada
- List of defunct airlines of Guinea
- List of defunct airlines of Guinea-Bissau

=== H ===
- List of defunct airlines of Haiti
- List of defunct airlines of Hong Kong
- List of defunct airlines of Hungary

=== I ===
- List of defunct airlines of Iceland
- List of defunct airlines of India
- List of defunct airlines of Indonesia
- List of defunct airlines of Iran
- List of defunct airlines of Iraq
- List of defunct airlines of the Republic of Ireland
- List of defunct airlines of Italy
- List of defunct airlines of Côte d'Ivoire
- List of defunct airlines of Ivory Coast

=== J ===
- List of defunct airlines of Japan
- List of defunct airlines of Jordan

=== K ===
- List of defunct airlines of Kazakhstan
- List of defunct airlines of Kenya
- List of defunct airlines of Kyrgyzstan

=== L ===
- List of defunct airlines of Laos
- List of defunct airlines of Latvia
- List of defunct airlines of Lesotho
- List of defunct airlines of Libya
- List of defunct airlines of Lithuania
- List of defunct airlines of Luxembourg

=== M ===
- List of defunct airlines of Malawi
- List of defunct airlines of Malaysia
- List of defunct airlines of the Maldives
- List of defunct airlines of the Marshall Islands
- List of defunct airlines of Mauritania
- List of defunct airlines of Mexico
- List of defunct airlines of Moldova
- List of defunct airlines of Morocco
- List of defunct airlines of Mozambique
- List of defunct airlines of Myanmar

=== N ===
- List of defunct airlines of Republic of Nauru
- List of defunct airlines of Nepal
- List of defunct airlines of the Netherlands
- List of defunct airlines of New Zealand
- List of defunct airlines of Niger
- List of defunct airlines of Nigeria
- List of defunct airlines of Norway

=== O ===
- List of defunct airlines of Oman

=== P ===
- List of defunct airlines of Pakistan
- List of defunct airlines of Panama
- List of defunct airlines of Papua New Guinea
- List of defunct airlines of the Philippines
- List of defunct airlines of Poland
- List of defunct airlines of Portugal
- List of defunct airlines of Puerto Rico

=== R ===
- List of defunct airlines of Romania
- List of defunct airlines of Russia
- List of defunct airlines of Rwanda

=== S ===
- List of defunct airlines of São Tomé and Príncipe
- List of defunct airlines of Saudi Arabia
- List of defunct airlines of Senegal
- List of defunct airlines of Serbia
- List of defunct airlines of Sierra Leone
- List of defunct airlines of Singapore
- List of defunct airlines of Slovakia
- List of defunct airlines of Slovenia
- List of defunct airlines of the Solomon Islands
- List of defunct airlines of South Africa
- List of defunct airlines of South Korea
- List of defunct airlines of Spain
- List of defunct airlines of Sri Lanka
- List of defunct airlines of State of Qatar
- List of defunct airlines of Sudan
- List of defunct airlines of Suriname
- List of defunct airlines of Sweden
- List of defunct airlines of Switzerland

=== T ===
- List of defunct airlines of Taiwan
- List of defunct airlines of Tanzania
- List of defunct airlines of Thailand
- List of defunct airlines of Turkey
- List of defunct airlines of Turkmenistan

=== U ===
- List of defunct airlines in Uganda
- List of defunct airlines of Uganda
- List of defunct airlines of Ukraine
- List of defunct airlines of the United Arab Emirates
- List of defunct airlines of the United Kingdom
- Lists of defunct airlines of the United States
  - List of defunct airlines of the United States (A–C)
  - List of defunct airlines of the United States (D–I)
  - List of defunct airlines of the United States (J–P)
  - List of defunct airlines of the United States (Q–Z)
- List of defunct airlines of the United States Virgin Islands

=== V ===
- List of defunct airlines of Vietnam

=== Y ===
- List of defunct airlines of Yemen

=== Z ===
- List of defunct airlines of Zambia
- List of defunct airlines of Zimbabwe

== See also ==
- Lists of airlines
- List of accidents and incidents involving commercial aircraft
- Airline bankruptcies in the United States
