= List of defunct airlines of Sierra Leone =

This is a list of defunct airlines of Sierra Leone.

Airline	Image	IATA	ICAO	Callsign	Commenced operations	Ceased operations	Notes
Aerolift			LFT	LIFTCO	2002	2006	
Afrik Air Links			AFK		1991	2005	
Air Leone			RLL	AEROLEONE	1999	2005	
Air Rum			RUM	AIR RUM	2002	2008	
Air Salone		2O	RNE		2004	2004	
Air Sultan			SSL	SIERRA SULTAN	2004	2005	Operated Ilyushin Il-76
Bellview Airlines		O3	BVU		1995	2009	
Central Airways			CNY	CENTRAL LEONE	2006	2006	
Destiny Air Services			DTY		2004	2005	Operated Boeing 727
Eagle Air		EA	EGR	EAGLE SIERRA	2006	2016	
First Line Air			FIR		2005	2005	
Fly 6ix		6I			2010	2011	
Fly Salone		5L			2015	2016	
HA Airlines			HSL		2001	2004	Operated Boeing 727
Ibis Air Transport					1996	2000	Renamed to Air Leone. Operated BAC 1-11, Boeing 707, Boeing 727, HS 748
Inter Tropic Airlines			NTT	INTER TROPIC	1999	2006	
Koda Air Cargo					2001	2001	Operated Boeing 707
Orange Air		O5	ORJ		2005	2006	
Pan African Air Services			PFN	PANAFRICAN	2005	2006	
Paramount Airlines			PRR	PARAMOUNT	2006	2007	
Provincial Air Services				PROVINCIAL	1988	1998	Operated Mil Mi-2
Quikmay Airlines			QUK		2001	2003	
Shoa Airlines					2003	2006	
Showa Air					2002	2004	
Sierra Leone Airlines		LJ	SLA		1982	1987	Rebranded as Sierra National Airlines
Sierra Leone Airways		LJ	SLA		1958	1982	Rebranded as Sierra National Airlines
Sierra National Airlines		LJ	SLA		1990	2006	
Sky Aviation			SSY	SIERRA SKY	2002	2009	
Skylink					2004	2006	
Star Air			SIM		2003	2005	Operated Lockheed TriStar
Trans Atlantic Airlines		KC	TLL	ATLANTIC LEONE	2003	2006	
West Coast Airways			WCA	WEST LEONE	1996	2006	Operated Let Turbolet

== See also ==
- List of airlines of Sierra Leone
- List of airports in Sierra Leone
