= EGR =

EGR may refer to:

== Transportation ==
- Eagle Air (Guinea) (ICAO code), a Guinean airline
- Eagle Air (Sierra Leone) (ICAO code), a defunct Sierra Leonean airline
- East Grinstead railway station (station code), England

== Other uses ==
- Early growth response proteins
- Earnhardt Ganassi Racing, a NASCAR team
- East Grand Rapids, Michigan
- EGaming Review, a British online gambling publishing brand
- Exhaust gas recirculation, in internal combustion engines
