= List of airlines of Hungary =

This is a list of airlines currently operating in Hungary.

== Scheduled airlines ==
Airline	IATA	ICAO	Callsign	Image	Commenced operations	Notes
Wizz Air	W6	WZZ	WIZZAIR		2003	Low cost carrier
Budapest Aircraft Service	RP	BPS	BASE		1991	Operating scheduled regional routes under the name of Aeroexpress Regional

== Charter airlines ==
Airline	IATA	ICAO	Callsign	Image	Commenced operations	Notes
Budapest Aircraft Service	RP	BPS	BASE		1991	Also known as BASe Airlines
Smartwings Hungary	7O	TVL	TRAVEL SERVICE		2001	Operating as Smartwings (QS)

== See also ==
- List of defunct airlines of Hungary
- List of airlines
