= Air Sierra Leone =

National airline of Sierra Leone

IATA	ICAO	Call sign
—	SXE	SALONE AIR
- Founded: 2024
- Commenced operations: 26 January 2025; 16 months ago
- Operating bases: Freetown International Airport
- Fleet size: 1
- Destinations: 3
- Key people: Emmanuel Iza (CEO)
- Website: flysierraleone.com

Air Sierra Leone is the flag carrier of Sierra Leone. The airline commenced operations with its maiden flight from the Sierra Leonean capital Freetown to Lagos, Nigeria, in January 2025. The airline originally announced that its first flights would be to London, a route that has previously been operated by British Airways and latterly by Fly Salone. The wetlease Ascend Airways who flys the UK to Freetown route on behalf of Air Sierra Leone went into liquidation on the 27th April 2026 citing amongst many issues, jet fuel prices as a catalyst. It was also reported that the airline would launch flights to the USA.

== History ==
Air Sierra Leone had announced that it would commence flights between Freetown and London Gatwick Airport in December 2024 using a Boeing 737-8 chartered from Ascend Airways. This did not happen because of delays in gaining regulatory approval and launching a ticket sales platform.

Instead, Air Sierra Leone's first flight was from Freetown to Lagos to Freetown on 22 January 2025. The flight used a smaller Embraer ERJ-145 which does not have the range to fly to London.

The airline has plans to expand to other West African capitals including Accra, Monrovia, Abidjan, Dakar, Conakry and Banjul in future. It is banned from flying in the European Union.

== Destinations ==
Country	City	Airport	Notes	Refs
The Gambia	Banjul	Banjul International Airport		
Nigeria	Lagos	Murtala Muhammed International Airport		
Sierra Leone	Freetown	Freetown International Airport	Hub	
United Kingdom	London	Gatwick Airport		

== Fleet ==
Air Sierra Leone's fleet consists of one leased Embraer ERJ-145 registered as 5N-BZZ. The airline is leasing UK registered aircraft to operate the London flight from the UK based Titan or Ascend Airways . Titan provided an Airbus A321-253NX(LR) whilst Ascend used a Boeing 737 MAX 8. Ascend ceased trading in April 2026.

Air Sierra Leone fleet
Aircraft	Number	Orders	Passengers	Notes
Embraer ERJ-145	1	—	50	Wet leased from XEJet in Nigeria.
Total	1	—		

== See also ==
- Transport in Sierra Leone
