= RDJ (disambiguation) =

RDJ is an initialism commonly referring to the American actor Robert Downey Jr.

RDJ may also refer to:

- Robert Downey Sr. (born Robert John Elias Jr.), American film director and father of Robert Downey Jr.
- Richard D. James, an Irish-born British musician
  - Richard D. James Album, his fourth studio album as Aphex Twin
- Former REDjet airline, ICAO code
- Rio de Janeiro
