= Sólyom =

Sólyom is an old Hungarian surname. Notable people with the surname include:

- Janos Solyom (1938–2017) Hungarian-born Swedish pianist, composer and conductor, uncle of Stefan
- László Sólyom (1942–2023), Hungarian politician, lawyer, and librarian
- László Sólyom (ice hockey) (born 1955) ethnic Hungarian ice hockey player in Romania
- László Sólyom (military officer) (1908-1950), Hungarian general executed in a show trial
- Stefan Solyom (born 1979), Swedish conductor and composer

== See also ==
- Sólyom Hungarian Airways, an airline founded 2013
- Sólyom is the Hungarian name of Șoimi, a Romanian commune
