= List of airlines of Guinea =

This is a list of airlines of Guinea, a small country in West Africa.

Airline	image	founded	notes
Air Guinée		1962	
Eagle Air		2017	
Elysian Airlines		2008	
flyGuinea		2025	planned
United Aviaton Service		2025	
