= Eagle Aviation =

Eagle Aviation may refer to one of several airlines:

- Eagle Aviation Limited was a United Kingdom airline that became British Eagle
- Eagle Aviation France (ICAO Code EGN) is an airline based in France
- Eagle Aviation Canada was a Canadian airline based in Silver Falls Water Aerodrome
- Eagle Aviation Columbia is a charter airline based in West Columbia, South Carolina
- Eagle Aviation LLC, a United States aircraft manufacturer based in Oshkosh, Wisconsin
- Eagle Aviation Spearfish is a charter airline based in Spearfish, South Dakota
- Cretan Eagle Aviation is a flight academy based in Greece, Crete

== See also ==
- Eagle Air (disambiguation)
