= List of airlines of Ethiopia =

This is a list of airlines in Ethiopia that are currently operating.

Airline	IATA	ICAO	Callsign	Image	Hub airport(s)	Notes
AberdAir	AR	ABA	AberdAir		Addis Ababa Bole International Airport	
Abyssinian Flight Services	AN	ABY	ABYSSINIAN		Addis Ababa Bole International Airport	Has aviation academy
East African Aviation					Addis Ababa Bole International Airport	
Ethiopian Airlines	ET	ETH	ETHIOPIAN		Addis Ababa Bole International Airport	Has aviation academy
National Airways Ethiopia	9Y	NAE			Addis Ababa Bole International Airport	
Trans Nation Airways	TT	TNW	TRANS-NATION		Addis Ababa Bole International Airport	

== See also ==
- List of airlines
- List of defunct airlines of Ethiopia
