= Closed lines =

Closed line or closed lines could refer to:

- Closed curve, a curve in mathematics where the two ends meet
- Closed line segment, a line segment in mathematics that includes both its endpoints
- Defunct airlines, or air travel companies that no longer exist
- Line (formation), a military formation in which soldiers are packed together into rows
- Close order formation, another military formation in which soldiers are packed together into a grid
- Abandoned railway, or a train line that is no longer used
