= List of defunct airlines of Hungary =

This is a list of defunct airlines of Hungary.

Airline	Image	IATA	ICAO	Callsign	Commenced operations	Ceased operations	Notes
ABC Air Hungary			AHU	ABC HUNGARY	1998	2015	
Aeroexpress			AXR		1922	1926	
Aero Rt.					1910	1920	
Air Budapest			BUD		1991	1992	
Air Hungaria			AHN		1993	2002	
Air Service Hungary			RSZ		1993	1999	
Arc Air					2003	2003	Failed project
ASL Airlines Hungary			FAH	BLUE STRIP	1990	2021	
Atlant-Aerobatics			ATU		1992	2000	Renamed/merged to Atlant-Hungary Airlines
Atlant-Hungary Airlines			ATU		2000	2007	
Aviaexpress		RX	AEH	Avex	1988	2003	
Carpathian Air Transport		KC	CPP		1999	2002	
CityLine Hungary		ZM	CNB	CITYHUN	2003	2015	
Civis Air					2006	2006	Never launched
Danube Air					1991	1993	
Farnair Hungary			FAH	BLUE STRIP	1997	2015	Renamed/merged to ASL Airlines Hungary
Farner Air Transport Hungary			FAH		1990	1997	Renamed/merged to Farnair Hungary
Fleet Air International			FRF	FLEETAIR	2007	2008	
G1 Company					1999	2000	
HunAir			HUV		1994	2004	
Hungarian Aviation Joint Stock Company					1922	1928	
Hungarian Charter Airlines					2013	2014	Never launched
Hungarian-Ukrainian Airlines (HUK)			HUK		1992	2002	
Hungarian Ukrainian Heavy Lift			HUC;HUK		1991	1994	Renamed/merged to Hungarian-Ukrainian Airlines
Hungarian World Airways					2012	2014	Never launched
Indicator Aviation			IDR		1991	2009	
Linair Hungarian Regional Airlines		LF	LIN		1994	2002	
Maefort					1920	1921	
Malert			MLR		1922	1944	Shut down following the German occupation of Hungary; merged in 1946 with Maefort and Aeroflot/Hungary to form Maszovlet
Malév Hungarian Airlines		MA	MAH		1954	2012	Liquidated
Malév Express			MEH	MALEV	2002	2005	Merged into Malév Hungarian Airlines
Maszovlet			MSU		1946	1954	Joint Hungarian-Soviet airline; rebranded as Malév Hungarian Airlines
NAWA Air Transport					1990	1993	Acquired by Farnair and rebranded as Farnair Hungary
Pannon Airlines		PU	PHU		1999	2002	
Quick Air Trans					1995	1996	
Repulogepes Szolgalat Allami Vallat					1995	1996	
SkyEurope Airlines Hungary		5P	HSK		2003	2007	
Sólyom Hungarian Airways			HUN	HUNGARIAN	2013	2013	Never started
Sunrise Airlines					1995	1996	
Transeuropa Union					1923	1925	Hungarian-Austrian-German joint airline
Travel Service		7O	TVL	TRAVEL SERVICE	2001	2018	Rebranded as Smartwings Hungary
Uniker AirCharter Co-op					1995	1996	
Union Airlines					2005	2006	

== See also ==
- List of airlines of Hungary
- List of airports in Hungary
