= List of defunct airlines of Republic of Nauru =

This is a list of now defunct airlines from Republic of Nauru.

Airline	IATA	ICAO	Callsign	Image	Commenced operations	Ceased operations	Notes
Air Nauru	ON	RON			1970	2005	renamed/merged to: Our Airline
Our Airline	ON	RON	Oceanic United Republics Airline		2006	2014	

== See also ==
- List of airlines of Nauru
- List of airports in Nauru
