= Eagle Air =

Eagle Air may refer to:

- Arnarflug, a former airline based in Iceland known internationally as Eagle Air
- Eagle Air (Guinea), an airline based in Guinea
- Eagle Air (Iceland), an airline based in Iceland
- Eagle Air (Sierra Leone), a former airline based in Sierra Leone
- Eagle Air (Tanzania), a former airline based in Tanzania
- Eagle Air (Uganda), an airline based in Uganda
- Eagle Airways (UK), the 1950s airline later titled British Eagle
- Eagle Airways, a former airline based in New Zealand

== See also ==
- PRiMA Aero Trasporti Italiani, an Italian airline formerly known as Eagles Airlines
