= List of airlines of Qatar =

This is a list of airlines currently operating in Qatar.

== Scheduled airlines ==
Airline	Image	IATA	ICAO	Callsign	Commenced operations	Notes
Qatar Airways		QR	QTR	QATARI	1993	The flag carrier and only commercial passenger airline of Qatar.

== Charter airlines ==
Airline	Image	IATA	ICAO	Callsign	Commenced operations	Notes
Gulf Helicopters			DOH		1970	
Qatar Executive		QR	QQE	QREX	2009	

== Cargo airlines ==
Airline	Image	IATA	ICAO	Callsign	Commenced operations	Notes
Qatar Air Cargo		QR	QAC	QATAR CARGO	2003	

== Government airlines ==
Airline	Image	IATA	ICAO	Callsign	Commenced operations	Notes
Qatar Amiri Flight			QAF	AMIRI	1977	

== See also ==
- List of airlines
- List of defunct airlines of State of Qatar
- List of defunct airlines of Asia
