= List of airlines of Oman =

This is a list of airlines currently operating in Oman.

== Scheduled airlines ==
Airline	Image	IATA	ICAO	Callsign	Commenced operations	Notes
Oman Air		WY	OAS/OMA	OMAN AIR	1993	
SalamAir		OV	OMS	MAZOON	2016	

== Private Airlines ==
Airline	Image	IATA	ICAO	Callsign	Commenced Operations	Notes
Al Sharqiya Aviation			SQI		2020	
AerOman					?	
Sahab Aviation Services					2020	

== Government airlines ==
Airline	Image	IATA	ICAO	Callsign	Commenced operations	Notes
Royal Flight of Oman					1974	
Royal Oman Police Air Wing					1974	

== See also ==
- Transport in Oman
- List of airlines
- List of defunct airlines of Oman
