= List of defunct airlines of Barbados =

This is a list of defunct airlines of Barbados.

Airline	Image	IATA	ICAO	Callsign	Commenced operations	Ceased operations	Notes
Air Calypso					1972	1974	
Bajan Helicopters					1989	2009	
Caribexpress			BCB	Caribair	1994	1996	
Carib West Airways					1971	1980	
Caribbean Air Cargo		DC	DCC	CARICARGO	1979	1992	
Caribbean Airways		IQ	IQQ	CARIBJET	1970	1988	Reincorporated as International Caribbean Airways in 1994
International Caribbean Airways		IQ			1994	1995	
REDjet		RD	RDJ	REDJET	2010	2012	
Trans Island Air			TRD		1982	2000	Renamed to Trans Island Air 2000
Trans Island Air 2000			TRD		2000	2004	
Tropic Air		OQ	TAS	Tropical Air Svcs	1973	1988	

== See also ==
- List of airlines of Barbados
- List of airports in Barbados
