= List of airlines of Papua New Guinea =

This is a list of airlines currently operating in Papua New Guinea.

Airline	Image	IATA	ICAO	Callsign	Commenced operations	Notes
Air Niugini		PX	ANG	NIUGINI	1973	
Asia Pacific Airlines (PNG)		A6	MLP		1991	
Hevilift		IU	PNG		1994	
Islands Nationair		CN			1984	
Lynden Air Cargo PNG		L8	LYB		2011	
MAF Papua New Guinea					1951	
Niugini Helicopters		HS	APP		2000	
Pacific Helicopters					1975	
PNG Air		CG	TOK	BALUS	1987	
Tropicair		9N	TAO	TROPISER	1998	
Adventist Aviation Services					1964	

== See also ==
- List of defunct airlines of Papua New Guinea
- List of defunct airlines of Oceania
- List of airlines
