= List of defunct airlines of Guinea =

This is a list of defunct airlines of Guinea.

Airline	Image	IATA	ICAO	Callsign	Founded	Ceased operations	Notes
Air Guinee		GI	GIB	AIR GUINEE	1960	2002	Renamed to Air Guinée Express
Air Guinee Express		2U	GIP	FUTURE EXPRESS	2002	2008	
Guinee Air Service			GIS	GASS	1985	2009	Operated Antonov An-26
Union des Transports Africains de Guinée			GIH	TRANSPORT AFRICAIN	2001	2004	Guinean and Lebanese joint venture

== See also ==
- List of airlines of Guinea
- List of airports in Guinea
