= Lungi Bridge =

Proposed bridge in Sierra Leone

The Lungi Bridge Project is a proposed major infrastructure project in the West African country of Sierra Leone. The 7km long bridge will link the Lungi area to Freetown, passing over the estuary of the Sierra Leone River.

Freetown International Airport is located at Lungi. Transit between Freetown and the airport currently requires a boat journey or a road trip that can take 3 hours.

The project was announced by President Julius Maada Bio. Its projected cost was initially $2 billion, making it the country's largest infrastructure project. In a state of the nation address in May 2021 the budget was reduced to $1.2 billion with a claim that construction would start later in the year. In December 2023 it was reported that the Government of Sierra Leone had signed a contract worth $1.5 billion with the China Road and Bridge Corporation with construction expected to commence by the end of 2024. The construction was expected to take 3 years to completion.

Following concerns over the project’s viability, a new Memorandum of Understanding was signed with Acrow Corporation of America on 19th June 2025 for the design, build, operation, and transfer (DBOT) of the project.

== History ==
Lungi International Airport was originally constructed as a base for the British Royal Air Force and was subsequently converted for civilian use. Lungi Airport is the country's only international airport. The difficulty with travelling between the airport and Freetown had always been a problem with various boats from canoes, government ferry and fast boats used to cross the estuary. In the past, helicopters, a hovercraft and light aircraft (to Hastings airfield) were used to pass over the Sierra Leone River estuary.

The previous government of Ernest Bai Koroma had proposed the new Mamamah International Airport, located near Songo Village, Koya Chiefdom in Port Loko District. The project was subsequently cancelled by President Julius Maada Bios government.
