= List of defunct airlines of Ethiopia =

This is a list of defunct airlines of Ethiopia.

Airline	Image	IATA	ICAO	Callsign	Commenced operations	Ceased operations	Notes
Addis Airlines			DDS	ADDIS LINE	2009	2010	Established as Air Ethiopia in 2008. Renamed to National Airways Ethiopia
Admas Air Service					1989	1994	Operated Douglas C-47
Air Ethiopia		7N			2008	2009	Renamed to Addis Airlines
Ethiopian Air Lines					1945	1965	Renamed to Ethiopian Airlines
Mitchell Cotts & Company					1960s	1960s	
MOENCO					1960s	1960s	
Oromia Airways					2009	2009	
RRC Air Services					1977	1995	Operated DHC-6 Twin Otter, Douglas C-47
Teddy Air Transport					2009	2009	
Transaharan Airlines					2003	2009	Operated Boeing 727-200

== See also ==
- List of airlines of Ethiopia
- List of airports in Ethiopia
