= List of defunct airlines of Turkmenistan =

This is a list of now defunct airlines from Turkmenistan.

Airline	IATA	ICAO	Callsign	Image	Founded	Ceased operations	Notes
Akhal Turkmenistan		AKH			1997	1999	Merged with Turkmenistan Airlines
Askal Air					1998	1999	Merged with Turkmenistan Airlines
Chardzhou Airline					1998	1999	
Khazar Air		KHR	KHAZAR		1992	2002	Merged with Turkmenistan Airlines
Lebap Air		LEB	LEBAP		1998	1999	Merged with Turkmenistan Airlines

== See also ==
- List of airlines of Turkmenistan
- List of airports in Turkmenistan
