= Air Leone =

Airline in Sierra Leone

IATA	ICAO	Call sign
-	RLL	AEROLEONE
- Founded: 1999
- Ceased operations: 2005
- Operating bases: Lungi International Airport
- Fleet size: 3
- Headquarters: Freetown, Sierra Leone

Air Leone was an airline based in Freetown, the capital of Sierra Leone. From its foundation in 1999 until being shut down in 2005, the airline operated regional passenger and cargo flights out of Lungi International Airport.

== Fleet ==
Upon closure, the Air Leone fleet included the following aircraft:

- 1 Antonov An-28
- 1 McDonnell Douglas DC-9-30
- 1 Yakovlev Yak-40
