= Aero Asia International =

Pakistani airline

Aero Asia
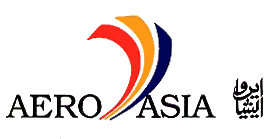

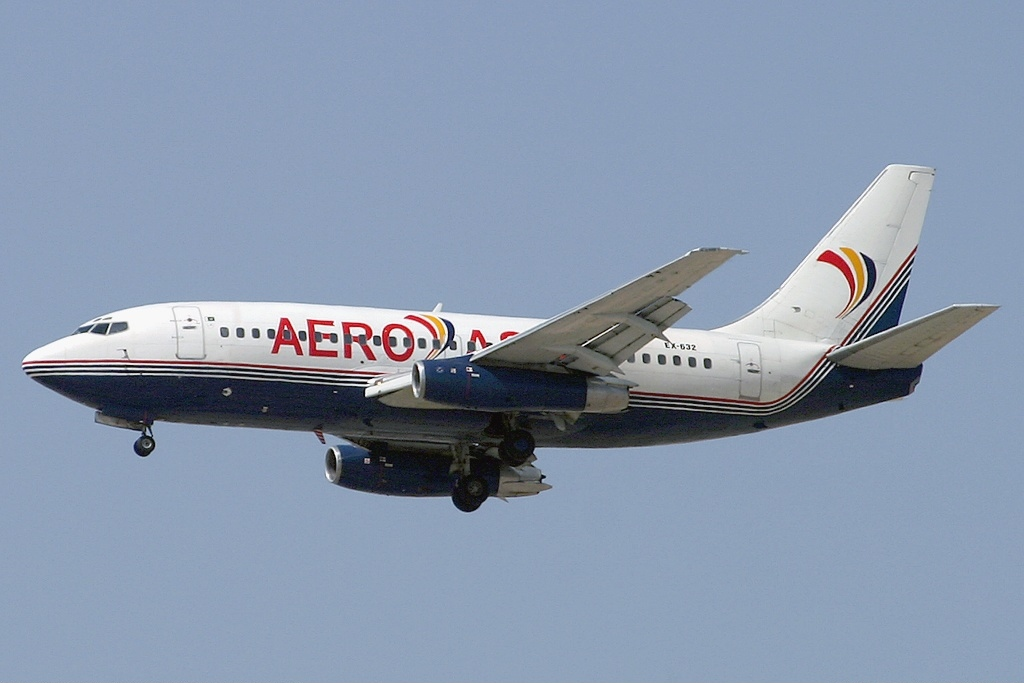
- Aero Asia Boeing 737-200
IATA	ICAO	Call sign
E4	RSO	AERO ASIA
- Founded: 1993
- Commenced operations: 4 May 1993
- Ceased operations: 19 March 2007
- Hubs: Jinnah International Airport
- Secondary hubs: Allama Iqbal International Airport
- Focus cities: Dubai; Abu Dhabi; Al-Ain; Muscat; Doha; Islamabad; Faisalabad; Multan; Peshawar; Quetta
- Destinations: 16
- Headquarters: Shahrah-e-Liaquat, Karachi-74000, Sindh, Pakistan
- Key people: Ebrahim Tabani
- Website: aeroasia.com (archives)

Aero Asia International (commonly known as AeroAsia) was a Pakistani airline based in Karachi, Pakistan from 1993 until its collapse on 19 May 2007.

Founded in 1993 by Tabani Group of Investors, a Memon business house, Aero Asia started its operations as a scheduled passenger and cargo air service to domestic and international destinations in Gulf states. Aero Asia was noted as a low-cost carrier with wide usage of jet aircraft and jumbo jets. In 2006, Aero Asia was acquired by the American Regal Group from the Tabani Investors but soon failed to provide safety guidelines to its customers.

The managerial, corporate management issues, and financial problems led to the airline's suspension by the Civil Aviation Authority (CAA) on 10 May 2007. Its previous management's issues relating to the operating compliance on CAA terms and its customer's safety guidelines failed to respond to repeated warnings over a lengthy period. Despite speculations on resuming its operations, the Aero Asia's corporate office's spokesperson confirmed its financial collapse.

== History ==
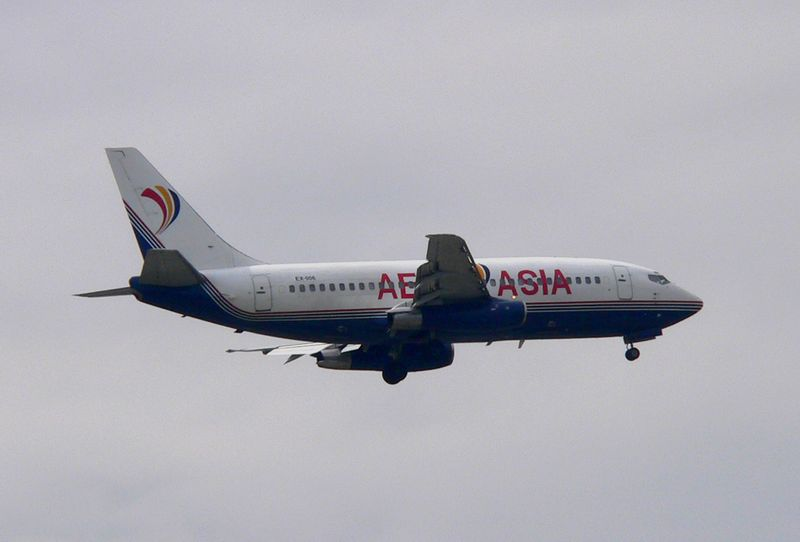
A Boeing 737-200Adv operated by the airline, seen wearing a Boeing/Aero Asia hybrid scheme

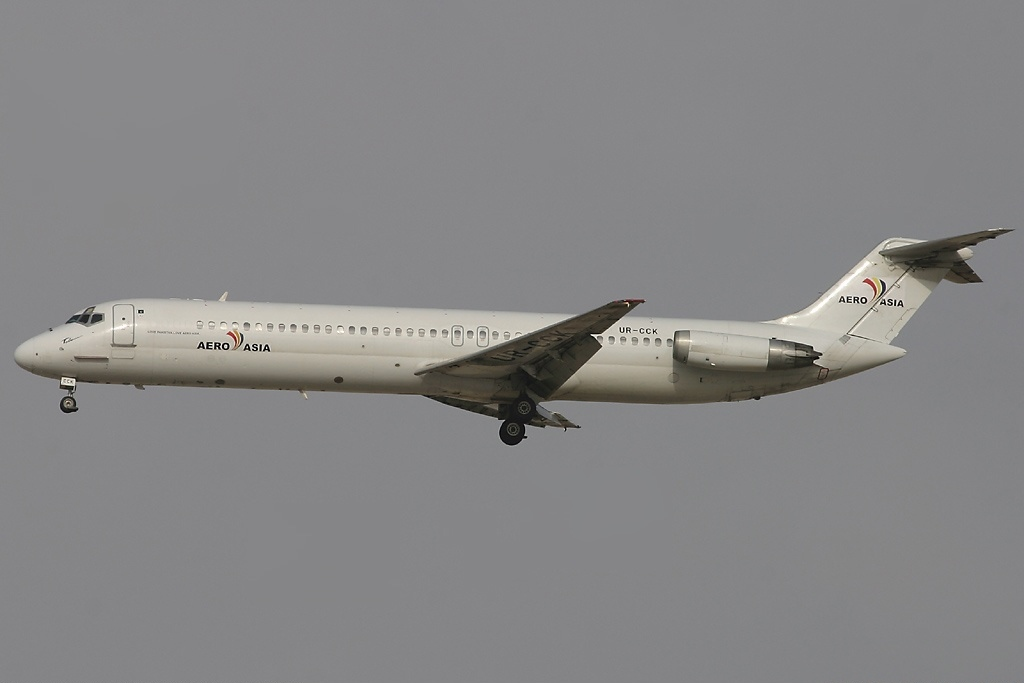
Aero Asia McDonnell Douglas DC-9

Aero Asia International (Pvt) Ltd. was established by Ebrahim Tabani in 1993 who benefited from the privatisation programme in 1993. Aero Asia started its aerial operations on 4 May 1993. Aero Asia made a promising start after employing former managerial and corporate staff of Pakistan International Airlines, and hired a flurry of former pilots of the PAF and the Navy. On immediate basis, Aero Asia contracted two Romanian Airlines aircraft for wet-lease and lease-purchase of the BAC 1-11. Operations were started with a wet-leased BAC 1-11 from the VIP fleet of Romania operated by Romanian Airlines, a sister company of the Romanian Air Force.

This fleet was primarily used by Romanian government dignitaries during Nicolae Ceaușescu's rule. However, the post-Ceaușescu governments decided to earn a little money by leasing this fleet to other commercial operators. Later, Aero Asia obtained four BAC 1-11s on lease-purchase option from TAROM, the national airline of Romania.

The airline in its initial years, made serious commitments to training its locally hired staff, following the example of PIA and in line with requirements of the local civil aviation authority. A small training school was also founded to train the cabin crew. Former Pakistan Air Force pilots were recruited. They began flying as co-pilots with the Romanian pilots.

In 1994, Aero Asia took the usual step for a private airline in Pakistan by recruitment of ex - Airmen from Pakistan Air Force and a batch of trainees for aircraft maintenance, announcing that a fully functional aircraft maintenance facility was planned. Senior retired staff from the PIA training center were employed and approval of the training school from the local civil aviation authority was sought.

Aero Asia started its international operation on a route to Bishkek, in Central Asia. For this purpose another aircraft from the VIP fleet of Romania, a Boeing 707 was leased. The move to shift international operations to central Asian ex-USSR states was supposed to help the other businesses of Tabani Group in penetrating the countries. Later, Aero Asia started flying to the Gulf Emirate of Sharjah, linking to Dubai via road network. It also established a small maintenance facility in Sharjah Airport Free Zone by taking over a small aircraft hangar and offering services to third parties.

== Destinations ==
Aero Asia International served the following, some routes were ended much before closure:

Country	City	Airport	Status	Refs
Kyrgyzstan	Bishkek	Manas International Airport	Terminated	
Oman	Muscat	Muscat International Airport	Terminated	
Pakistan	Faisalabad	Faisalabad International Airport	Terminated	
Pakistan	Islamabad	Benazir Bhutto International Airport	Terminated	
Pakistan	Karachi	Jinnah International Airport	Terminated	
Pakistan	Lahore	Allama Iqbal International Airport	Terminated	
Pakistan	Multan	Multan International Airport	Terminated	
Pakistan	Pasni	Pasni Airport	Terminated	
Pakistan	Peshawar	Bacha Khan International Airport	Terminated	
Pakistan	Quetta	Quetta International Airport	Terminated	
Pakistan	Sukkur	Sukkur Airport	Terminated	
Qatar	Doha	Doha International Airport	Terminated	
United Arab Emirates	Abu Dhabi	Abu Dhabi International Airport	Terminated	
United Arab Emirates	Al Ain	Al Ain International Airport	Terminated	
United Arab Emirates	Dubai	Dubai International Airport	Terminated	
United Arab Emirates	Sharjah	Sharjah International Airport	Terminated	

== Former Fleet ==
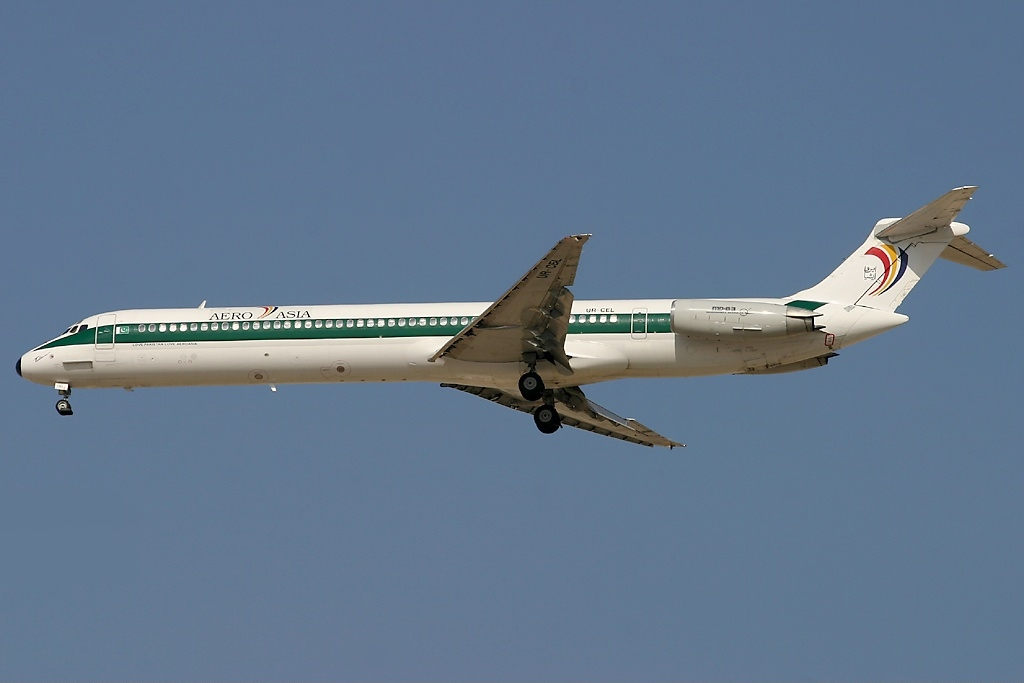
An Aero Asia McDonnell Douglas MD-83 flying at Dubai International Airport in 2005

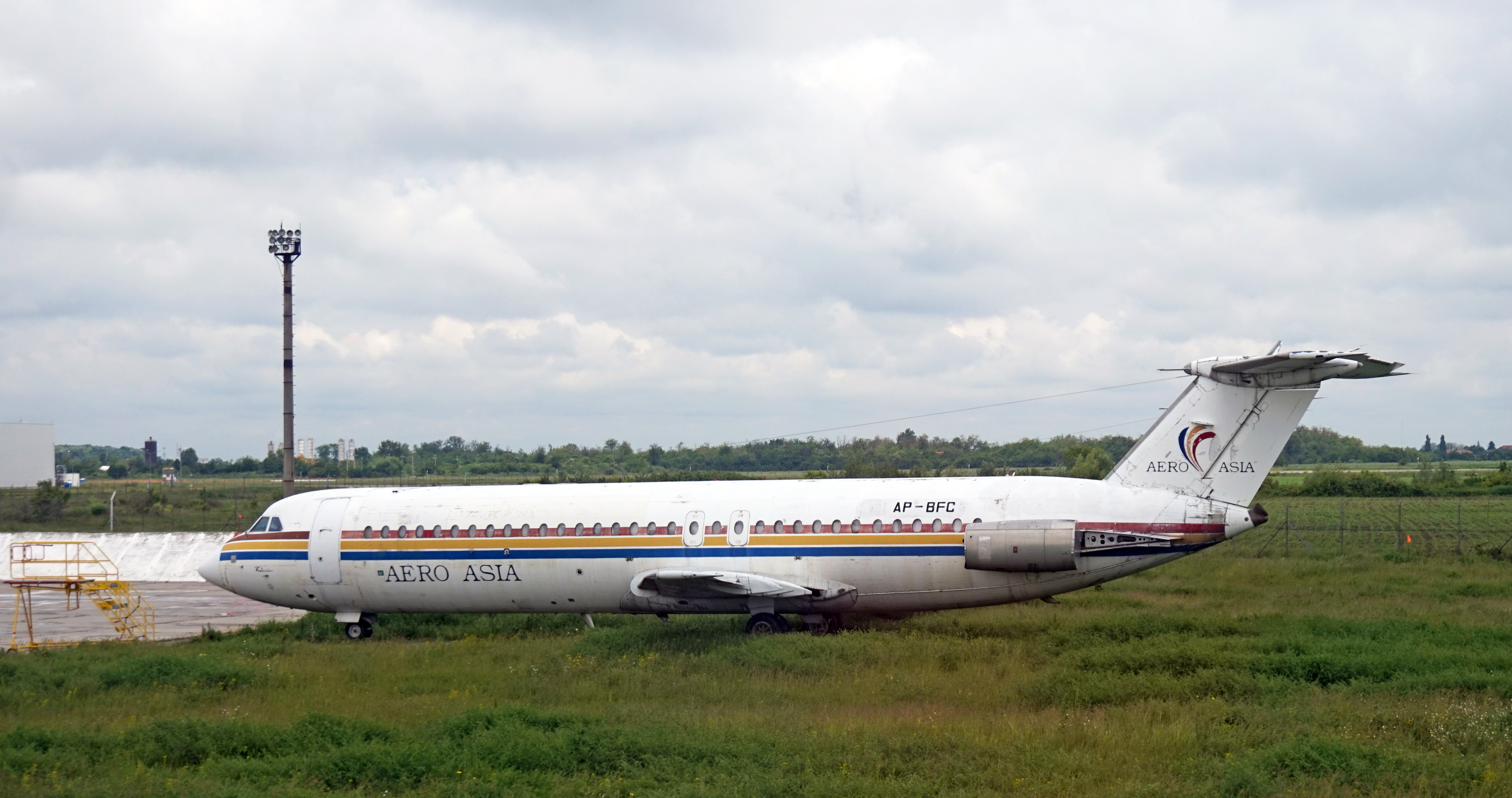
Derelict Aero Asia BAC One-Eleven at Bucharest Airport

The company returned the aircraft being operated on 19 May 2007 under wet lease arrangements to the lessors and was negotiating to acquire a fleet of five 737-300 aircraft under funding arrangements concordant with the 2007 Draft National Aviation Policy for Pakistan.

Over the years Aero Asia operated these aircraft:

Aircraft	In Fleet	Notes
RomBAC One-Eleven Series 500	7	
Boeing 707-320C	1	
Boeing 737-200	5	
McDonnell Douglas DC-9-51	2	(Leased from Khors Air)
McDonnell Douglas MD-82	3	
McDonnell Douglas MD-83	2	
Yakovlev Yak-42	3	
Total	23	

== See also ==
- List of defunct airlines of Pakistan
