= Mamamah International Airport =

- IATA: none; ICAO: none

Summary
- Airport type: Public, civilian
- Owner: Government of Sierra Leone
- Operator: Sierra Leone Airports Authority
- Serves: Freetown & Koyo Town; Sierra Leone
- Location: Songo Village, Port Loko District
- Coordinates: 08°22′49″N 12°54′20″W

Map
- Location of Mamamah International Airport in Sierra Leone; Placement on map is approximate

Runways
| Direction | Length | | Surface |
| Direction | ft | m | Surface |
|---|---|---|---|
| | | | Asphalt |

Mamamah International Airport (IATA: none, ICAO: none) was an airport under construction in Sierra Leone. It was part of the infrastructure to be built as Sierra Leone prepared to shift its political and administrative capital, away from over-crowded Freetown.

== Location ==
Mamamah Airport was to be located in Mamboima, near Songo Village, Koya Chiefdom in Port Loko District, approximately 50 kilometres (31 mi), by road, south-east of Freetown, the capital and largest city in the West African country. The average elevation of Songo Village is 26 metres (85 ft), above sea level.

== Overview ==
This airport would be a large international airport capable of handling large passenger and cargo aircraft. The airport development was expected to be followed by the construction of a new State House, parliament building, ministry buildings, court houses and other support facilities. The developments were intended to improve Sierra Leone's competitiveness as the country prepares to become a middle income country by 2035.

Other related development projects are the planned bridging of Tagrin Bay, which separates Freetown from the peninsula on which Freetown International Airport is located, and the ongoing expansion of the port of Freetown. The Mamamah airport contract has been terminated.

A SLPP government led by President Maada Bio cancelled the contract with the Chinese construction company, that was contracted to build the airport.

== Construction ==
China Railway International Group (CRI), a subsidiary of China Railway Group Limited (CREC), had been contracted to build the airport at a cost of US$318 million, borrowed from the Exim Bank of China. Work began in March 2018 and completion was expected in 2022.

== Controversy ==
This development project had drawn criticism from the World Bank (WB) and the International Monetary Fund (IMF) because of the level of debt that the country would be left with.

== Cancellation ==
The project was cancelled in October 2018, following a change in government/president. The new Aviation Minister Kabineh Kallon said that the president saw no need for a new airport and preferred to refurbish the airport at Lungi (which officially became Freetown International Airport) and possibly build a bridge to link Lungi directly to Freetown. The Lungi Bridge project was later announced by the president.

== See also ==
- List of airports in Sierra Leone
