= List of defunct airlines of the Solomon Islands =

This is a list of now defunct airlines from the Solomon Islands.

Airline	IATA	ICAO	Callsign	Image	Founded	Ceased operations	Notes
King Solomon AL					1997	1999	
Solomon Islands Seaplanes					2009	2012	

== See also ==
- List of airlines of Solomon Islands
- List of airports in Solomon Islands
