= List of defunct airlines of Guinea-Bissau =

This is a list of defunct airlines of Guinea-Bissau.

Airline	Image	IATA	ICAO	Callsign	Founded	Ceased operations	Notes
Air Bissau		TZ	GBU	TRANSBISSAU	1989	1998	
Air Luxor GB		L8	LXG		2004	2006	Formed by Air Luxor (49%) and local interests.
Bissau Air Transports			ASV	ASTRAVIA	2001	2001	
Guine Bissau Airlines (2002)					2002	2003	
Guine Bissau Airlines		G6	BSR	GUINE AIRLINES	2010	2010	
Halcyon Air Bissau Airways			HCN		2006	2009	
Linhas Aéreas da Guine-Bissau		GB		LAGB	1974	1987	Renamed to TAGB
Safari Guinée Bissau Airlines		G6	BSR		2010	2010	
Transportes Aéreos da Guiné-Bissau		YZ	GBU	TAGB	1960	1989	Renamed to Air Bissau

== See also ==
- List of airports in Guinea-Bissau
