= List of defunct airlines of Papua New Guinea =

This is a list of defunct airlines of Papua New Guinea.

Airline	Image	IATA	ICAO	Callsign	Commenced operations	Ceased operations	Notes
Airlines of Papua New Guinea		CG	TOK		2001	2015	Renamed/merged to PNG Air
Milne Bay Air		CG	MBA		1987	2001	Renamed/merged to Airlines of Papua New Guinea
Airlink		ND			1989	2007	
Ansett Airlines of Papua New Guinea		PN			1968	1973	
Ansett-MAL					1961	1968	Renamed/merged to Ansett Airlines of Papua New Guinea
Mandated Airlines					1945	1961	Renamed/merged to Ansett-MAL
Asia Pacific Airlines					1991	1996	Renamed Fubilan Air Transport
Regional Air (Papua New Guinea)		QT			2002	2005	Merged into Hevilift
Talair		GV	TZL	TALAIR	1952	1993	Aircraft were transferred to Flight West
Travel Air		4P			2011	2016	

== See also ==
- List of airlines of Papua New Guinea
- List of airports in Papua New Guinea
