= Trans Island Air 2000 =

| IATA | ICAO | Call sign |
|---|---|---|
| — | TRD | TRANS ISLAND |
- Founded: 1982 (as Trans Island Air); 2000 (renamed)
- Ceased operations: 2004
- Operating bases: Grantley Adams International Airport
- Headquarters: Christ Church, Barbados
- Website: tia2000.com

Trans Island Air 2000 (abbreviated TIA) is an airline from Barbados, with headquarters is in St. Phillip and operates regional charter flights (including cargo) out of its base at Grantley Adams International Airport.

== History ==
The airline was founded in 1982 as Trans Island Air and rebranded as Trans Island Air 2000 in 2000, and at this time operated a mixed fleet including Pilatus Britten-Norman Islanders, Rockwell Aero Commanders, a DHC-6 Twin Otter and an Embraer EMB-110 Bandeirante. TIA2000 has now been approved by all necessary government agencies (Barbados) to re-commence flight operations. It is expected to be fully operational by April 2017. Its web-site, www.tia2000.com, is currently under design development and is expected to launch by April 1, 2017 at the latest.

== Official Launch ==
The airline launch its first schedule flight on May 29, 2017 serving 5 Caribbean Islands, the service from Barbados starts four days a week but as July the various service will operate daily to the Islands launched.

== Grounded ==
The airline announce in of April 2018, that it will temporarily ground its own airlines and reimburse its customers.

== Fleet ==
| Aircraft | In service | Orders | Passengers | Notes |
|---|---|---|---|---|
| King Air | 1 | — | 7 | |
| Beech 99 | 2 | — | 15 | — |
| Twin Otter | 1 | — | 19 | |
| Total | 6 | | | |

== Destinations ==
- Barbados
  - Seawell, Christ Church - Grantley Adams International Airport - (Hub)
- Dominica
  - Roseau - Canefield Airport
- Grenada
  - St. George's - Maurice Bishop International Airport
- Saint Lucia
  - Castries - George F. L. Charles Airport
- Saint Vincent and the Grenadines
  - Kingstown - E.T. Joshua Airport
