= Air Guinee Express =

Guinean national airline (1960–2002)

Air Guinee

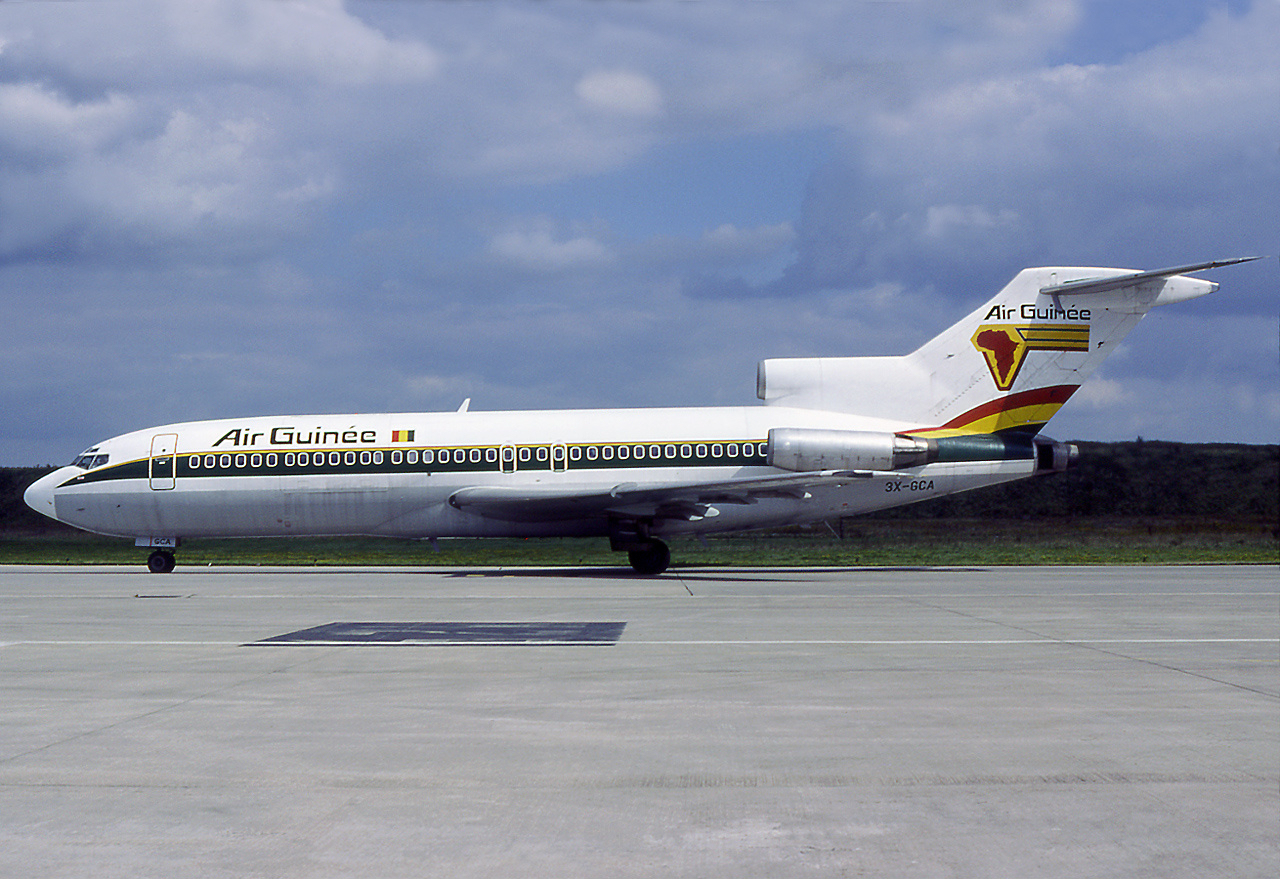
- Air Guinee Boeing 727
IATA	ICAO	Call sign
GI	GIB	AIR GUINEE
- Founded: 1960
- Ceased operations: 2002
- Hubs: Conakry International Airport, Guinea
- Headquarters: Conakry, Guinea
- Website: mirinet.com/AirGuinee/

Compagnie Nationale Air Guinée, in its latter years known as Air Guinee Express, was an airline based in Conakry, Guinea. Its main base was Conakry International Airport.

Air Guinée was the first national airline of Guinea; it had its head office in Kaloum, Conakry. Founded in 1960, the company was privatised in 1992, and was eventually dissolved in 2002; remaining portions of the business continued as Air Guinee Express, which operated domestic services.

== Code data for Air Guinee Express ==
- IATA Code: 2U
- ICAO Code: GIP
- Callsign: FUTURE EXPRESS

== History ==
=== Air Guinee ===
When the idea of Air Afrique was being mooted, Guinea and Mali opted not to join the consortium with other, mainly French West African, nations, and instead chose to form their own national airlines. In March 1960 the Guinean government signed a series of agreements with the Soviet Union, one of which provided for the supply of aircraft, crews and other technical assistance, ostensibly aimed at upgrading Conakry's airport. The company was founded by decree N°048/PRG/ on 31 December 1960, with technical support from the Soviets, who also supplied an aircraft: an Ilyushin Il-14. The aircraft originated from Czechoslovakia and was crewed by Czechoslovak crews. Operations began before the end of the year, with flights from Conakry to Boké and Kankan, both of which had previously been operated by Union Aéromaritime de Transport. Service to Bamako commenced shortly afterwards, and the route was shared between Air Guinée, UAT and Air France. In April 1961, Air Guinée was nationalised.

Over the years services to Dakar, Freetown and Monrovia were started, with plans to service Paris and Moscow also raised; however, these services were not implemented because Guinea failed to obtain traffic rights to France. Before the relationship between Air Guinée and the Soviets concluded in 1963, the airline had obtained one Yakovlev Yak-40, four Antonov An-24s and two Antonov An-12s. In December 1962 Air Guinée signed a contract with Alaska Airlines which saw the American airline providing management expertise, in addition to two Douglas DC-6s. The deal would have seen Alaska Airlines contracting with the airline over a seven-year period; however, the contract ended after only six months, leading to the United States Agency for International Development paying a US$700,000 debt owed by the Guinean airline to Alaska Airlines.

Services from Conakry to Dakar with the Il-18 were inaugurated on 24 August 1962, and the route was later extended to Lagos via Monrovia, Abidjan and Accra. The Il-18 was later replaced by two Douglas DC-4s which were purchased from Alaska Airlines, and the airline also obtained four LASA-60s. By mid-1963 the Air Guinée fleet comprised six Avia-14s, three Ilyushin Il-18s, two Douglas DC-4s, two LASA-60s, one Aero 145, one Mil Mi-14 helicopter, five Yakovlev Yak-18s, three Antonov An-2s and one Yodel.

In 1965 Pan American World Airways was contracted to provide technical personnel and a DC-4 for the airlines' use; however, the agreement did not last for long, and the Soviets returned to the airline, supplying an Antonov An-24 for delivery in 1966-1967. In December 1965, the airline temporarily suspended operations as only one route was showing a profit, and the aircraft were suffering frequent breakdowns. On 9 July 1967 one of the airline's Il-18s was written off in an accident at Casablanca. The aircraft was on a scheduled flight to Prague when due to bad weather it was diverted to Casablanca. On landing, its left wing hit a building, causing the aircraft to crash into "rough ground". There were no fatalities amongst the 102 occupants on board, but the aircraft had to be written off.

In the 1970s the fleet was expanded with the addition of one Boeing 707, one Boeing 727-100 and one Boeing 737-200. An Air Guinée Il-18 crashed at Conakry on 3 September 1978, killing 15 of the 17 on board.

In 1985 an Airbus A300 was delivered to the airline in order to allow it to commence services to Paris and Brussels. By the early 1990s, Air Guinée operated domestic services from Conakry to Boké, Faranah, Kankan, Kissidougou, Labé, Macenta, Siguiri and Nzérékoré, and international flights to Abidjan, Bamako, Dakar, Freetown, Lagos and Monrovia.

By the late 1980s, the airline had cost the country some US$4 million and had no prospects for turning a profit for its shareholder, the Guinean government.

=== Privatisation ===
The company was privatised in 1992, and was eventually dissolved in 2002. Its operations were taken over by Groupe Futurelec and the airline rebranded as Air Guinée Express.

== Air Guinee ii ==
The airline which was long defunct was mulled again and in July of 2023 the government of Guinea had announced the creation of the new Air Guinee with the public company SOGUITRAP, the government of Guinea would then suggest that private owners could help use their aircraft for the national fleet.

On December 24 2024 the Guinean government would announce the cost to revive the airline would be $20 million.

In August 2025 the government of Guinea would ink an MoU for the revival.

The new relaunch of Air Guinee was announced to be a private airline so that the airline would not repeat the same mistakes that the Guinean government would make.

== Destinations ==
Air Guinee Express operated services to the following international scheduled destinations (at January 2005): Abidjan, Bamako, Banjul, Dakar, Freetown, Kinshasa and Lagos.

== Fleet ==
The Air Guinee Express fleet consisted of the following aircraft (at March 2007):

- 4 Antonov An-12
- 4 Antonov An-24B (including at least 1 Xi'an Y7-100)
- 1 Bombardier Dash 7 Seris 100

=== Previously operated ===
At June 2005 the airline also operated:

- 1 Boeing 737-200 delivered in 2003 (written off)

== Incidents and accidents ==
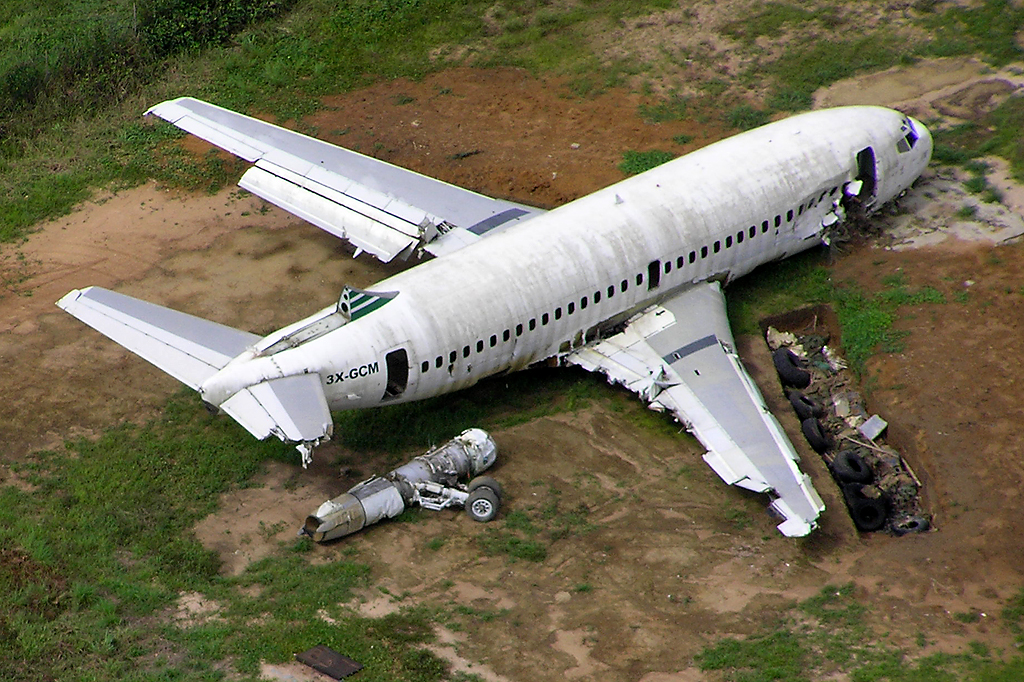
Air Guinee Express Boeing 737-205 at Freetown Lungi Airport (2006 photo)

- On 11 August 2004 a Boeing 737-200, registration 3X-GCM, failed to take off from Freetown - Lungi International Airport (Sierra Leone). There were no fatalities among the 127 passengers and crew members. The aircraft was damaged beyond repair and was written off; the wreckage can still be seen resting next to the runway.

Accident description on aviation-safety.net

== See also ==
- List of defunct airlines of Guinea
- Transport in Guinea
