= List of defunct airlines of State of Qatar =

This is a list of defunct airlines of the State of Qatar:

== Defunct airlines ==
Airline	IATA	ICAO	Image	Callsign	Commenced operations	Ceased operations	Notes
Rizon Jet		RZQ			2006	2016	
Al Maha Airways	QR	QTR		QATARI	2014	2017	Commenced in 2014, Al Maha Airways was set to be initially based in Saudi Arabia and later based in Qatar. Due to problems obtaining its operational license and the Qatar diplomatic crisis, the project was abandoned and Al Maha Airways ceased operations in 2017. The remaining 4 Airbus A320s were repainted and joined service with Qatar Airways.

== See also ==
- List of airlines of Qatar
- List of airports in Qatar
