= REDjet =

Barbados-based airline

IATA	ICAO	Call sign
RD	RDJ	REDJET
- Founded: 2010
- Commenced operations: May 10, 2011
- Ceased operations: June 8, 2012
- Hubs: Grantley Adams International Airport
- Fleet size: 3
- Destinations: 6
- Parent company: Airone Ventures Limited
- Headquarters: Grantley Adams International Airport; Christ Church, Barbados
- Key people: Robbie Burns (Founder) and Ian Burns (Chair)
- Website: www.flyredjet.com

REDjet Caribbean Ltd., operating as REDjet (Airone Caribbean/Airone Ventures Limited), was a startup low-cost carrier based at the Grantley Adams International Airport in Christ Church, Barbados, near Bridgetown. The privately owned airline, incorporated in Barbados, featured a fleet of McDonnell Douglas MD-80 aircraft.

== History ==
The idea of starting REDjet first came about in 2006, when the 23 year founder Robbie Burns experienced the high cost of fares for airlines in the Caribbean often while making large annual financial losses. Upon completing a review with the Government of Jamaica and other regional parties, the company decided to start a low-cost airline to serve the region with a model similar to Ryanair's first low cost operations.

Initially, the airline sought to start operations from Norman Manley International Airport, in Kingston, Jamaica. However, the airline shifted its hub to Barbados after being denied permission to set up in Jamaica by the Jamaican Government. Since that time, REDjet's CEO has announced that he would again be seeking to have a larger airline company based in Jamaica.

In 2010, a private sector envoy announced an intention to base a start-up airline at the Grantley Adams International Airport. The name of the parent company is AIRONE Holdings Limited (AVL), and the air venture will seek to form "the Caribbean's first low-cost carrier". The envoy had initially attempted to begin operations from Jamaica however, Jamaican aviation authorities reportedly rejected their application for licenses. Following this, the envoy shifted focus basing operations from Barbados. On October 16, 2010, Airone Holdings Ltd. launched their airline brand REDjet, at the Lloyd Erskine Sandiford Centre. On December 10, the airline's first (of two) introductory McDonnell Douglas MD-82 aircraft named 'Jacqualicious' after an employee, was delivered to REDjet. On February 1, 2011, REDjet's second aircraft 'Hey Jude' was delivered to REDjet at the Grantley Adams International Airport. On the same day Business Development Manager, Robbie Burns, announced that the airline was itching to start selling tickets and get into the air, stating that the airline had already invested over 1 million USD into crew and staff hiring and training. REDjet has also concluded the purchase of their third aircraft to be delivered in late November early December. The airline has named the aircraft "Nickitastic".

On April 12, 2011, the FAA announced that Barbados failed to meet regulation standards which would prevent Barbados-based airlines (including REDjet) from flying to the US. The airline began marketing tickets on April 13, 2011 and operations commenced on May 10, 2011

On July 18, 2011, REDjet commences service between Barbados and Trinidad. Jamaica swiftly followed Trinidad and Tobago in granting clearance to the Barbados-based low-cost carrier. Operations began in October 2011.

On July 27, 2011, REDjet confirmed its plans to expand its operations to other Caribbean destinations in light of an announcement that the airline had gained approval to land in St Kitts (St.Christopher) and Nevis by its Prime Minister Dr. Denzil Douglas.

On August 5, 2011, REDjet was scheduled to begin flights into St Lucia as early as October 2011 by St. Lucian Tourism and Civil Aviation Minister Senator Allen Chastanet. After considerable delays, final government approval was awarded by the Barbados government in November 2011. Flights to St. Lucia commence on December 17, 2011.

On August 9, 2011, REDjet, announced it was expanding its service to Antigua and began selling tickets for flights between Trinidad and Guyana, just days after securing licences under the terms of a bilateral 'open-skies' air services agreement. The Antiguan authorities have granted REDjet permission to begin flights to St John’s. The airline plans to inaugurate a direct Antigua-Guyana route by late November.

On March 16, 2012, REDjet suspended all flights at 23:59 after coming into financial difficulties. The collapse of the airline was announced over social networking by the airline's CEO. It hoped to receive government subsidies to restart the service. On June 8, 2012, REDjet announced its closure.

== Destinations ==
REDjet served the following scheduled destinations :

Country	City	Airport	Start date	Refs
Antigua and Barbuda	St. John's	V. C. Bird International Airport	November 22, 2011	
Barbados	Bridgetown	Grantley Adams International Airport	Hub	
Guyana	Georgetown, Guyana	Cheddi Jagan International Airport	May 10, 2011	
Jamaica	Kingston	Norman Manley International Airport	November 20, 2011	
Saint Lucia	Vieux Fort	Hewanorra International Airport	December 16, 2011	
Trinidad and Tobago	Port of Spain	Piarco International Airport	July 28, 2011	

== Fleet ==
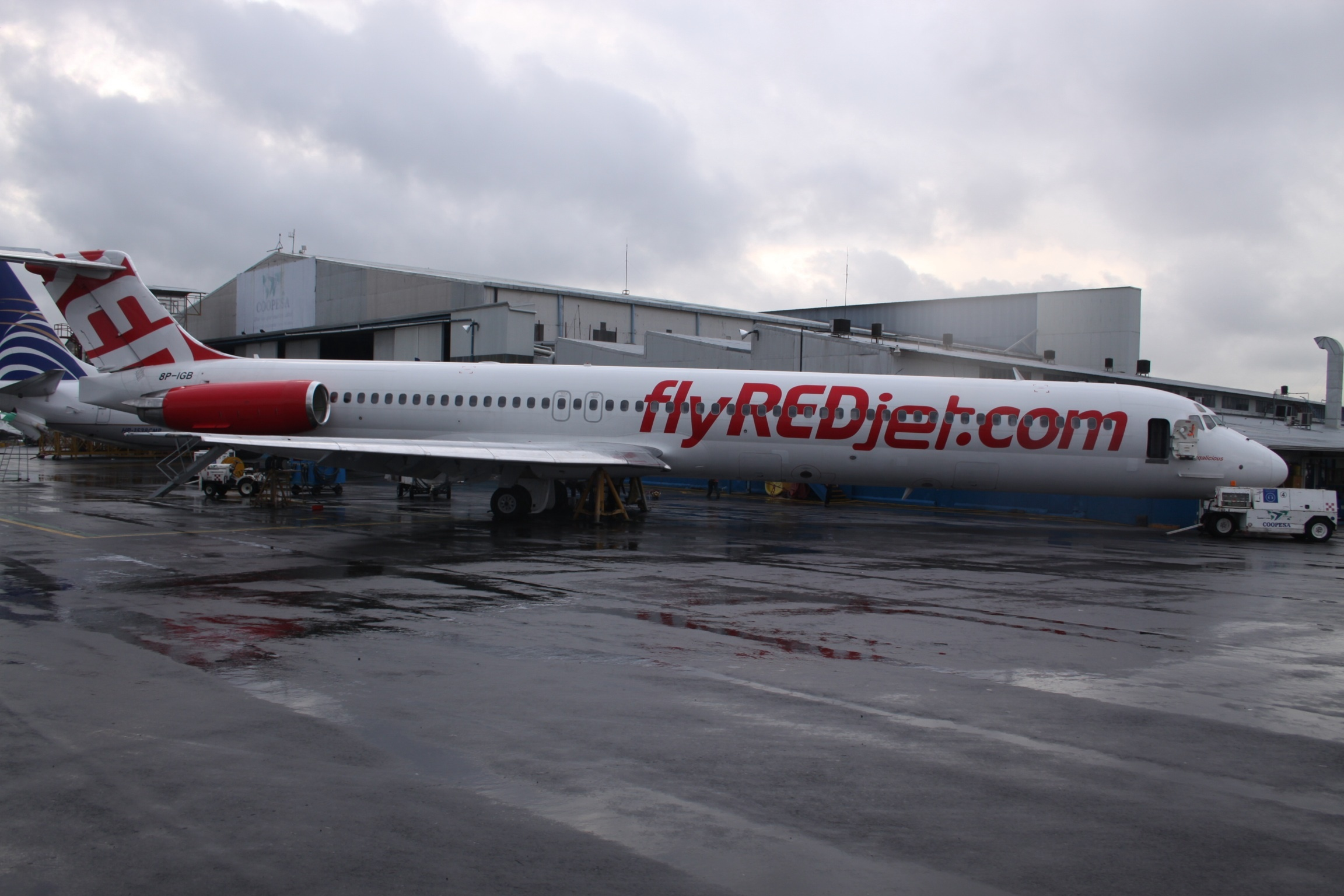
A REDjet McDonnell Douglas MD-82 parked at Juan Santamaría International Airport in 2012

The fleet of REDjet consisted of the following aircraft:

REDjet fleet
Aircraft	In service	Orders	Passengers	Notes
McDonnell Douglas MD-82	2	—	149	
McDonnell Douglas MD-83	1	—	149	
Total	3	—		

== See also ==
- List of defunct airlines of Barbados
