= List of defunct airlines of Grenada =

This is a list of defunct airlines of Grenada.

Airline	IATA	ICAO	Callsign	Image	Founded	Ceased operations	Notes
Airlines of Carriacou	C4	COU	AIR CARRIACOU		1992	2000	Merged into SVG Air
Grenada Airways	GG				1985	1987	
Pearl Air					1975	1978	

== See also ==
- List of airports in Grenada
