= List of defunct airlines of the Marshall Islands =

This is a list of now defunct airlines from the Marshall Islands.

Airline	IATA	ICAO	Callsign	Image	Commenced operations	Ceased operations	Notes
Airline of the Marshall Islands	CW	MRS	AMI		1980	1990	renamed/merged to: Air Marshall Islands

== See also ==
- List of airlines of the Marshall Islands
- List of airports in the Marshall Islands
