= List of defunct airlines of Pakistan =

This is a list of defunct airlines of Pakistan.

Airline	Image	IATA	ICAO	Callsign	Commenced operations	Ceased operations	Notes
Aero Asia International		E4	RSO	AeroAsia	1993	2007	
Air Indus		I6	MPK	AIR INDUS	2010	2015	
Air Eagle			EGA		2006	2010	
Bhoja Air		B4	BHO	BHOJA	1993	2012	
Hajvairy Airlines			HAJ	FAIZAN	1991	1993	
JS Air			JSJ		2006	2011	
K2 Airways		K2	KTA	CITY LINK	2017	2026	Sole aircraft crashed
Orient Airways				ORIENT	1947	1955	Initially founded in British India; merged with other airlines to form Pakistan International Airlines
Pak Airways					1948	1949	
Rayyan Air			RAB		2009	2015	
Shaheen Air		NL	SAI	SHAHEEN AIR	1994	2018	

== See also ==
- List of airlines of Pakistan
- List of airports in Pakistan
