= Travel Air (Papua New Guinea) =

Travel Air PNG
IATA	ICAO	Call sign
4F	-	-
- Commenced operations: July 2010
- Ceased operations: 2016
- Operating bases: Jacksons International Airport
- Fleet size: 2
- Destinations: 11
- Parent company: Trans Global Investments
- Headquarters: Port Moresby, Papua New Guinea
- Website: www.travelairpng.com

Travel Air was an airline based in Port Moresby, Papua New Guinea. It operated charter and scheduled passenger services. Its main base was at Jacksons International Airport, Port Moresby. In 2016 the airline ceased all operations.

== History ==
The airline was established and started operations in 2010. The airline is also known as Mangi lo Ples and was rescued by Indonesian firm Trans Global Investments in February 2016.

== Fleet ==
The Travel Air fleet consisted of 4 Fokker 50 aircraft (at June 2016).

== Destinations ==
The airline served 11 domestic destinations in the country:

- Alotau
- Buka
- Hoskins
- Kokopo
- Lae
- Madang
- Mt Hagen
- Popondetta
- Port Moresby
- Vanimo
- Wewak
