= Guine Bissau Airlines (2002) =

Airline in Guinea-Bissau, 2002–2003

IATA	ICAO	Call sign
G6	BSR	—
- Founded: 2002
- Commenced operations: 2002

Guine Bissau Airlines was an airline in Guinea-Bissau. It was founded in 2002 and disestablished again in 2003.
