= Eagle Air (Sierra Leone) =

Airline based in Sierra Leone

| IATA | ICAO | Call sign |
|---|---|---|
| EA | EGR | EAGLE SIERRA |
- Founded: 2006
- Commenced operations: 11 December 2006
- Ceased operations: 2016
- Operating bases: Lungi International Airport (Sierra Leone)
- Fleet size: 2
- Destinations: 11
- Parent company: Eagle Air (Sierra Leone) Limited
- Website: http://www.sierraleonetravel.com/eagle_air.htm

Eagle Air was an airline from Sierra Leone, existing from 2006 to 2016, with Lungi International Airport as its operating base.

== History ==
The company was formed in 2006 as a successor to Sierra National Airlines. It currently operates scheduled and charter services from Lungi International Airport.

== Destinations ==
In 2018 Eagle Air has six destinations

| Country | City | Airport |
|---|---|---|
| Guinea | Conakry | Conakry International Airport |
| Liberia | Monrovia | Roberts International Airport |
| Sierra Leone | Freetown | Lungi International Airport |

== Fleet ==
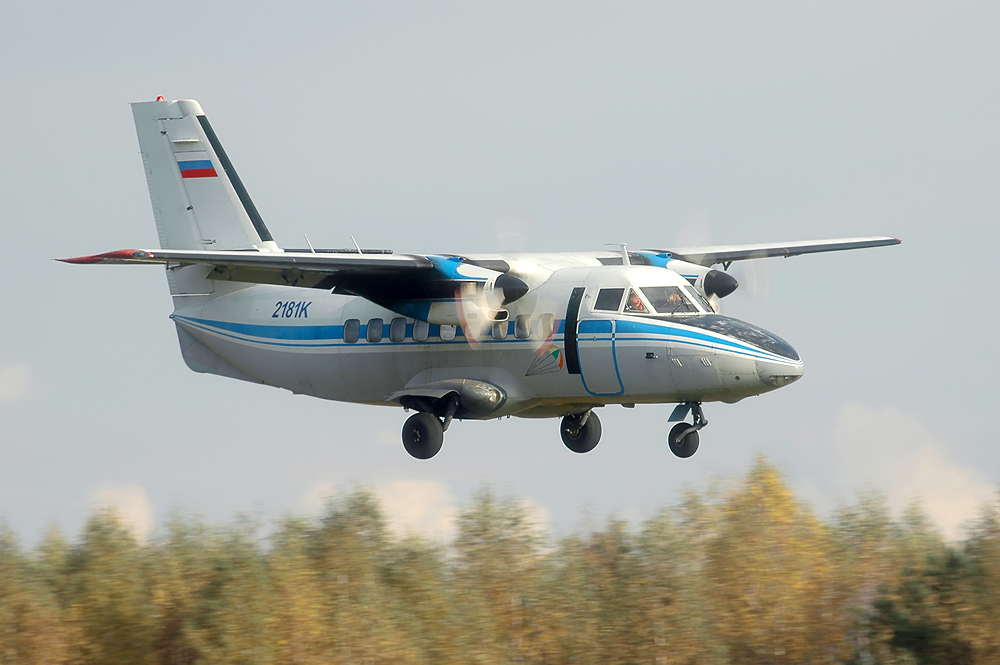
An Eagle Air Let L-410 landing.

Eagle Air's fleet has a fleet of one aircraft.

| Aircraft | In fleet | Orders | Passengers | | | Notes |
| Aircraft | In fleet | Orders | J | Y | Total | Notes |
|---|---|---|---|---|---|---|
| Let L-410UVP | 2 | — | — | 19 | 19 | |
| Total | 2 | 0 | | | | |

== See also ==
- Eagle Air (disambiguation)
