= List of defunct airlines of Oman =

This is a list of defunct airlines of Oman.

== Defunct airlines ==
Airline	Image	IATA	ICAO	Image	Callsign	Commenced operations	Ceased operations	Notes
CargOman		HC	CGM			1977	1980	
Dhofar City Airways						1960	1961	
Gulf Aviation						1950	1974	renamed/merged to: Gulf Air
Oman Aviation Services Company S.A.O.		WY	OAS		ORYX	1981	1993	renamed/merged to: Oman Air
Muscat Aviation Services						2003	2003	
Al Buraq Aviation Company Ltd						1999	Unknown	

== See also ==
- List of airlines of Oman
- List of airports in Oman
