= List of airlines of Turkmenistan =

This is a list of airlines currently operating in Turkmenistan.

== Scheduled airlines ==
Airline	Image	IATA	ICAO	Callsign	Founded	Notes
Turkmenistan Airlines		T5	TUA	TURKMENISTAN	1992	Flag carrier

== See also ==
- List of airlines
- List of defunct airlines of Asia
