= Budapest Aircraft Service =

Hungarian airline

BASe Airlines
IATA	ICAO	Call sign
RP	BPS	BASE
- Founded: 1991; 35 years ago
- Hubs: Budapest Ferenc Liszt International Airport
- Fleet size: 3
- Destinations: 3 (scheduled)
- Headquarters: Budapest, Hungary
- Website: baseairlines.hu

BASe Airlines Zrt., formerly also named Budapest Aircraft Service, is a Hungarian regional airline based at Budapest Ferenc Liszt International Airport in Budapest. Besides charter services it operates public service obligation routes.

== History ==
BASe Airlines was established in December 1991 by experienced aviation pilots and technicians. The company was based in Budapest, so Budapest-Ferihegy Airport was chosen as the basis for the operations. The flight operations began with two leased LET L-410 and included charter and freight flights. From that moment onwards, scheduled passenger flights to neighboring countries began, such as Austria, Ukraine and Croatia, under the call sign of the former AVIAEXPRESS. Starting in 1992, on behalf of foreign partners, night flights were made to Austrian, Slovak and Italian destinations from Budapest, Zagreb and Ljubljana. In addition to the operations mentioned above, between 1994 and 2006, BASe Airlines managed and operated eleven Hungarian National Health Service helicopters for HEMS (Helicopter Emergency Medical Service) tasks based on a network of six heliports, as well as a fixed wing aircraft for international air ambulance services.

Starting in 1996, the operation of a special equipped L-410 UVP-E8 (aircraft for aerial works - Flight Inspection Service) by a contract with Budapest Airport Rt. has further improved BASe capabilities, now able to provide precision calibration/test flights of civil and tactical air navigation systems both in Hungary and abroad. The first "Turbolet" aircraft was purchased in 1997, followed by the second in 2000, and by the first helicopter. The same aircraft, as well as some leased Antonov An-26B, were also used for freight transport, both regular and charter, to destinations throughout Europe since 2002. At the same time BASe Airlines operated scheduled flights on behalf of Bosnian Airlines to Rome and Belgrade.

According to the challenge of the tourism, BASe started to operate some seasonal flights from Budapest and other small Hungarian airports to famous tourist destinations in Croatia and Montenegro since 2003. With the first Embraer EMB 120, purchased in the summer of 2005, tourist flights have continued and increased, adding to the destinations also Tivat, Corfu and Burgas, in collaboration with the major Hungarian Tour Operators.

Between 2006 and 2011, BASe Airlines flew on behalf of Air Moldova, in particular following the expansion of the fleet, which since 2008 has seen the purchase of two additional EMB-120s. In the same period BASe began to operate a helicopter Bell 206 for tourist flights and aerial work. In 2007, a contract was signed with the national airline Malév Hungarian Airlines to start running some of its regional flights. During the first season, BAS Airlines flew to Ljubljana and Timișoara on behalf of Malév.

== Destinations ==
Besides charter operations, BASe Airlines acquired a public service obligation contract for scheduled flights between Helsinki and Savonlinna in 2023 as well as a connection to Pori.

== Fleet ==
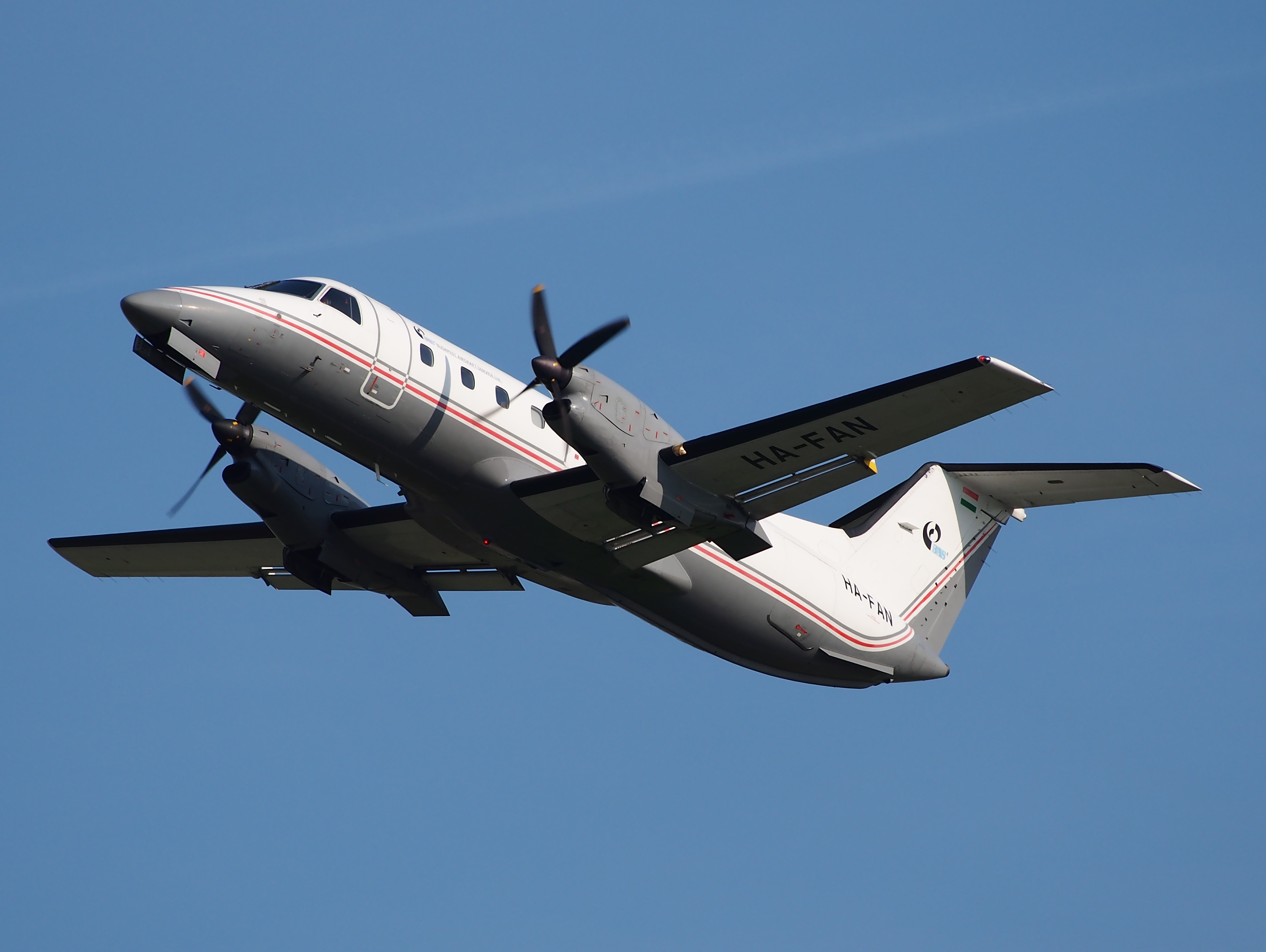
BASe Airlines Embraer EMB 120 Brasilia

=== Current fleet ===
As of July 2026, Budapest Air Service operates the following aircraft:

BASe Airlines fleet
Aircraft	In fleet	Orders	Notes
Embraer EMB 120 Brasilia	3	—	
Total	3	—	

=== Former fleet ===
As of August 2025, Budapest Aircraft Service operated 3 Embraer EMB 120 Brasilia.
