= List of airlines of the Solomon Islands =

This is a list of airlines currently operating in the Solomon Islands.

Airline	Image	IATA	ICAO	Callsign	Founded	Notes
Solomon Airlines		IE	SOL	SOLOMON	1962	National airline

== See also ==
- List of airlines of Oceania
