= List of airlines of Nauru =

This is a list of airlines currently operating in Nauru.

Airline	Image	IATA	ICAO	Callsign	Commenced operations	Notes
Nauru Airlines		ON	RON	AIR NAURU	1970	

== See also ==
- List of airlines
- List of defunct airlines of Oceania
