= List of defunct airlines of Anguilla =

This is a list of defunct airlines of Anguilla.

Airline	Image	IATA	ICAO	Callsign	Founded	Ceased operations	Notes
Air Anguilla					1972	2002	
Anguilla Airways					1972	1973	
Tyden Air					1979	2005	
Valley Air Service					1969	1979	Went bankrupt. Operated BN-2 Islander, Piper Aztec, Piper Navajo

== See also ==
- List of airlines of Anguilla
- List of airports in Anguilla
