= List of defunct airlines of Burundi =

Airline	Image	IATA	ICAO	Callsign	Founded	Ceased operations	Notes
Africargo					1999	2000	
Air Burundi		8Y	PBU	AIR-BURUNDI	1975	2009	
Air Kivu					2004	2006	
Air Tanganyika					1997	1999	Operated Boeing 707
Air Turbo Cargo					2004	2006	
Burundi Charter & Cargo					1993	1994	
Centre Air Afrique					1976	1977	Operated Bristol Britannia
City Connexion Airlines		G3	CIX	CONNEXION	1998	2000	
Royal Air Burundi					1962	1963	
Société de Transports Aériens du Burundi		PB		STABAIR	1971	1975	Renamed to Air Burundi
Starwelt Airlines					1998	2000	

== See also ==
- List of airlines of Burundi
- List of airports in Burundi
