= Sierra Leone Airways =

Airline

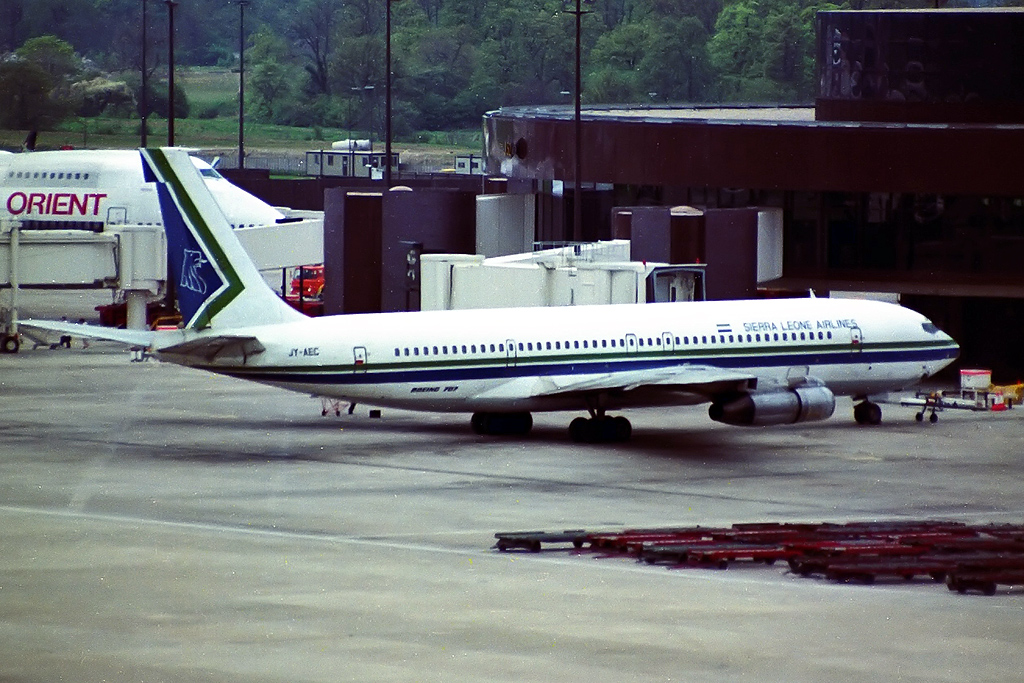
IATA	ICAO	Call sign
LJ	SLA	SIERRA NATIONAL AIRLINES
- Founded: 1958; 68 years ago
- Ceased operations: 2006; 20 years ago
- Hubs: Freetown Lungi International Airport
- Alliance: Eagle Air
- Fleet size: 1
- Destinations: 5 (London, Banjul, Monrovia, Conakry and Amsterdam)
- Headquarters: Freetown, Sierra Leone
- Website: https://web.archive.org/web/20071217202636/http://www.flysna.com/

Sierra Leone Airways was the national airline of Sierra Leone. It was based at the Lungi International Airport, in Lungi, Sierra Leone. It operated scheduled domestic, regional and international services.

== History ==
Sierra Leone Airways was founded as Sierra Leone's national carrier in 1958 when the government withdrew from the regional West African Airways Corporation partnership with Nigeria, Ghana, and the Gambia. In 1982, the Sierra Leone government entered into a partnership with Alia/Royal Jordanian Airlines, and relaunched Sierra Leone Airways as Sierra Leone Airlines. Following the suspension of operations by Sierra Leone Airlines in 1987, services from Freetown were resumed on 1 May 1990 under the Sierra National Airlines.

== Complications ==
In early 2004 the airline experienced some problems with its United Kingdom Sales and Reservations structures which were restructured. Scheduled flights between London Gatwick Airport and Lungi International Airport, Freetown, resumed on 30 November 2004.

They intend to operate a Douglas DC-9 on Freetown – Liberia – Accra – Abidjan services, and a service between Freetown and Johannesburg. A Boeing 767 would be used on the Freetown-London service, with connections to other cities in Europe. They also intended to commence flights to Dubai with connections through Banjul and Conakry

In early 2005 the Sierra Leone Airports Authority claimed that SNA owed them US$800,000 in charges for landing fees, electricity, rent and ground handling services and complained that the refusal to pay the debts is affecting their operations. They won a court case against the airline but the government stopped the process.

== International scheduled destinations ==
As of January 2005 Sierra National Airlines operated the following services:

- London (Gatwick Airport)
- Amsterdam (Amsterdam Schiphol Airport)
- Banjul (Banjul International Airport)
- Monrovia (Roberts International Airport)
- Conakry (Conakry International Airport)

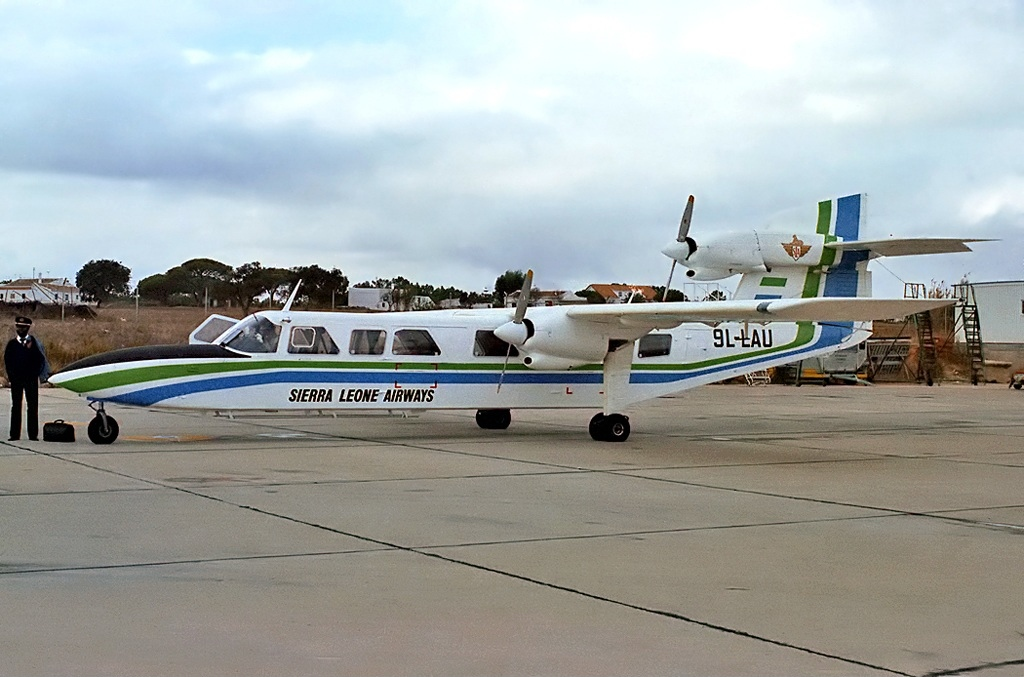
A Britten-Norman BN-2A at Freetown

== Fleet ==
- de Havilland Dragon Rapide
- de Havilland Heron
- Scottish Aviation Twin Pioneer
- Bristol Britannia 312
- Vickers VC10
- Boeing 707
- Boeing 720
- Boeing 727
- Boeing 767
- Britten Norman BN-2A Trislander
- Lockheed L-1011
- McDonnell Douglas MD-83
