= National Airways Ethiopia =

Airline of Ethiopia

National Airways
IATA	ICAO	Call sign
9Y	NAE	NATIONAL
- Founded: November 2007; 18 years ago
- Hubs: Addis Ababa Bole International Airport
- Fleet size: 5
- Headquarters: Addis Ababa, Ethiopia
- Employees: 75
- Website: www.nationalairways.com

National Airways Ethiopia, formerly known as Air Ethiopia, is a private airline based in Addis Ababa, Ethiopia. It was established in 2007 and has been operating charter services since 2009.

== History ==
National Airways was founded as Air Ethiopia in November 2007 by Abera Lemi and rebranded Addis Airlines in 2009. He had previously worked for the Ethiopian flag carrier, Ethiopian Airlines. In 2010 the airline was renamed to the current name.

In November 2017 the airline purchased three Embraer ERJ 145 aircraft from NovoAir, an airline from Bangladesh, with the financial backing of Airstream International Group (AIG).

In September 2019, the airline announced it had been permitted to start operating domestic (scheduled) services by the Ethiopian Civil Aviation Authority (ECAA), although the ECAA clarified that the approval was "in principle," and that they were "still working on the details".

As of May 2021, the company had not launched scheduled service.

== Fleet ==
=== Current fleet ===
As of July 2026, National Airways (Ethiopia) operates the following aircraft:

National Airways Ethiopia fleet
Aircraft	In service	Orders	Passengers			Notes
Aircraft	In service	Orders	J	Y	Total	Notes
Embraer ERJ 145	4	—	NA			
National Airways Ethiopia Cargo fleet
Boeing 737-200F	1	—	Cargo			Part of a cooperation agreement with NAS Cargo and Logistics
Total	5	0				

=== Former fleet ===
As of September 2019, National Airways Ethiopia operated 1 Fokker 50, 1 Beech 1900D, 4 Embraer ERJ 145, 4 De Havilland Canada Dash 8 and 1 Boeing 737F:
