= Smartwings Hungary =

Airline of Hungary

| IATA | ICAO | Call sign |
|---|---|---|
| 7O | TVL | TRAVEL SERVICE |
- Founded: 2001; 25 years ago
- Operating bases: Budapest; Debrecen
- Fleet size: 2
- Destinations: 13
- Parent company: Smartwings
- Headquarters: Budapest, Hungary
- Website: www.smartwings.com

Smartwings Hungary Kft., formerly named Travel Service Hungary, is an airline based in Budapest, Hungary, operating charter flights out of Budapest Ferenc Liszt International Airport. It was founded in 2001 and is a subsidiary of Smartwings from the Czech Republic.

== Destinations ==
As of August 2018, Smartwings Hungary offers flights to the following seasonal charter destinations:

| Country | City | Airport | Notes | Refs |
|---|---|---|---|---|
| Bulgaria | Burgas | Burgas Airport | Seasonal | |
| Egypt | Hurghada | Hurghada International Airport | Seasonal | |
| Egypt | Sharm el-Sheikh | Sharm El Sheikh International Airport | Seasonal | |
| Greece | Corfu | Corfu International Airport | Seasonal | |
| Greece | Heraklion | Heraklion International Airport | Seasonal | |
| Greece | Rhodes | Rhodes International Airport | Seasonal | |
| Greece | Zakynthos | Zakynthos International Airport | Seasonal | |
| Hungary | Budapest | Budapest Ferenc Liszt International Airport | Base | |
| Hungary | Debrecen | Debrecen International Airport | Focus city | |
| Spain | Barcelona | Josep Tarradellas Barcelona–El Prat Airport | Seasonal | |
| Spain | Palma de Mallorca | Palma de Mallorca Airport | Seasonal | |
| Tunisia | Monastir | Habib Bourguiba International Airport | Seasonal | |
| Turkey | Antalya | Antalya Airport | Seasonal | |

== Fleet ==
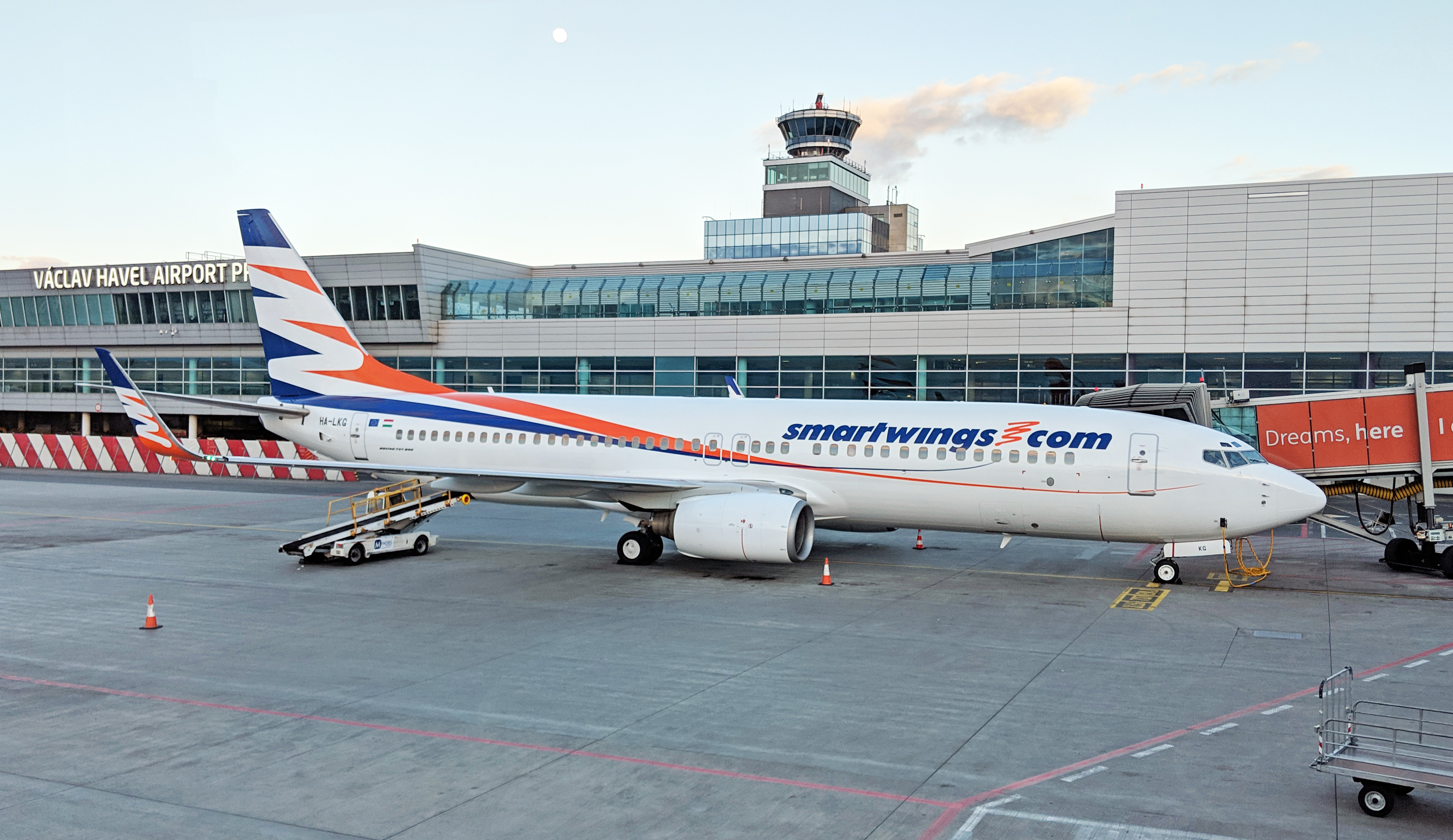
Smartwings Hungary Boeing 737-800

=== Current fleet ===
As of July 2026, Smartwings Hungary operates the following aircraft:

Smartwings Hungary fleet
| Aircraft | In service | Orders | Passengers | | | Notes |
| Aircraft | In service | Orders | C | Y | Total | Notes |
|---|---|---|---|---|---|---|
| Boeing 737-800 | 2 | — | – | 189 | 189 | |
| Total | 2 | — | | | | |

=== Former fleet ===
As of August 2025, Smartwings Hungary operated 1 Boeing 737-800
