= Freetown International Airport =

Sole international airport serving Freetown, Sierra Leone

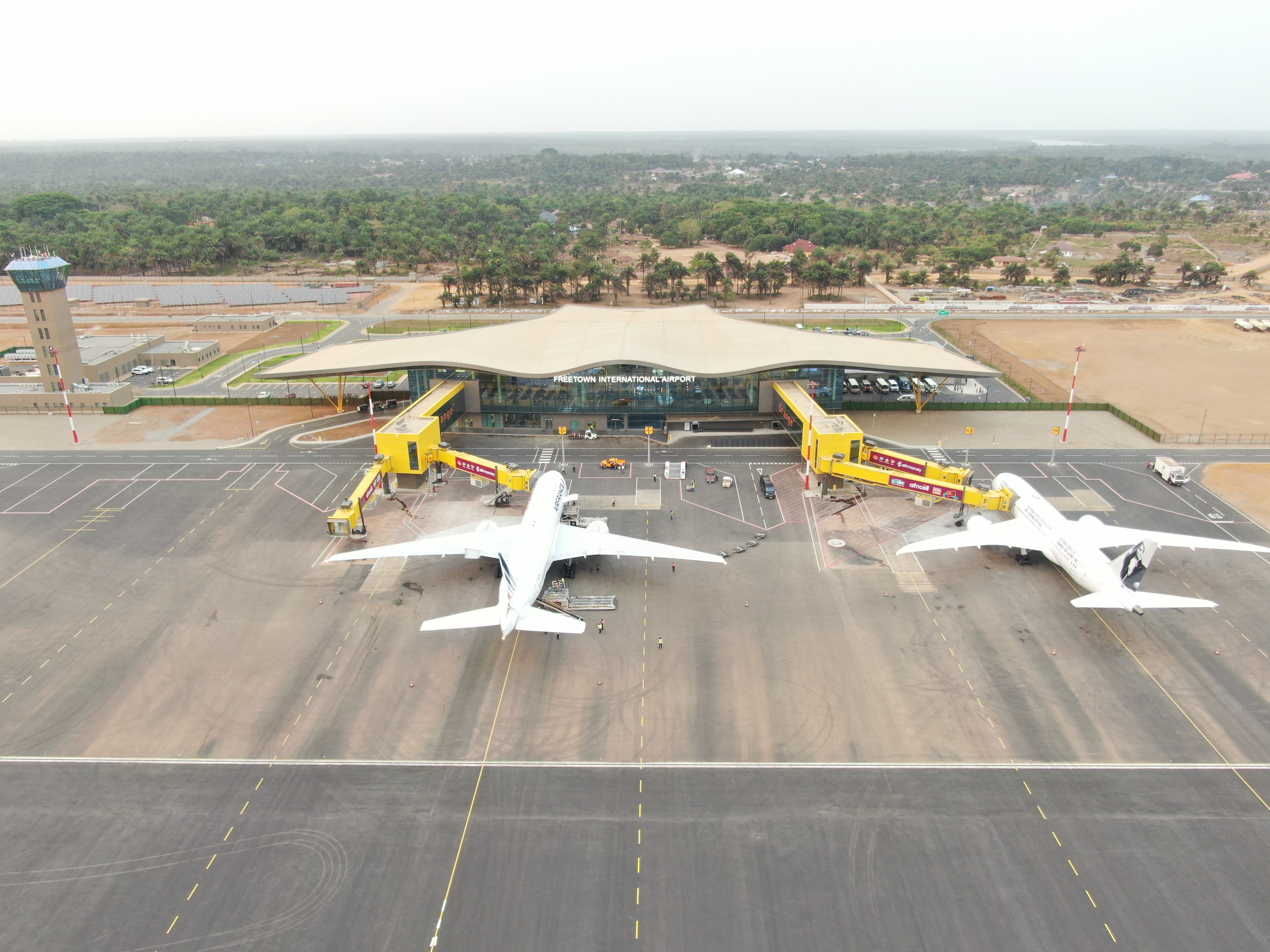
- IATA: FNA; ICAO: GFLL

Summary
- Airport type: Public
- Serves: Freetown and the entire Sierra Leone
- Location: Lungi, Port Loko District, Sierra Leone
- Elevation AMSL: 93 ft (28 m)
- Coordinates: 08°36′59.20″N 13°11′43.76″W

Map
- Location within Sierra Leone

Runways
Direction	Length		Surface
Direction	ft	m	Surface
12/30	10,498	3,200	Asphalt

Statistics (2020)
- Passengers volume: 93,619
- Aircraft movements: 1,314
- Cargo (metric tons): 2,025

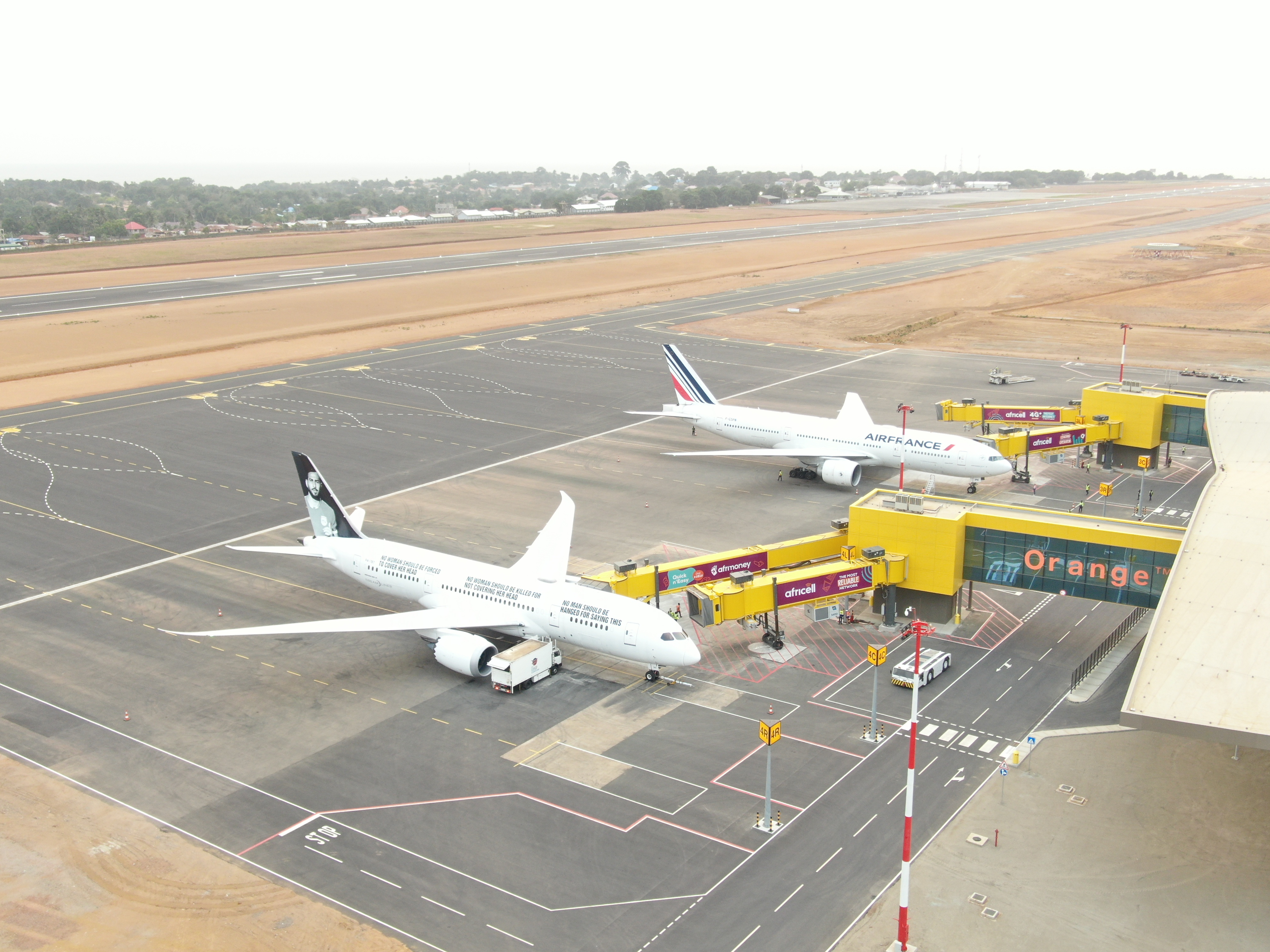
Airbridges at FNA

Freetown International Airport (IATA: FNA, ICAO: GFLL) (officially), formerly known as Lungi International Airport, is an international airport situated in the coastal town of Lungi, Sierra Leone. It is the sole international airport in Sierra Leone. The Sierra Leone River separates the airport from Freetown, the capital city.

== History ==
Until 1949, an airstrip at Waterloo served the city of Freetown. Because of subsidence of the runway and the proximity of the hills, the Government decided in 1947 to abandon Waterloo and make Lungi, a British Royal Air Force base, the airport for Freetown. Waterloo airfield was closed in June 1949. The senior architect of the Public Works Department, Robin Halliday Macartney, supplied a draft plan for the terminal building, which then became the responsibility of the airport engineer A. E. Pugh. The plans had to be altered considerably to comply with new medical regulations and work did not start before 1953. The control tower had been built in 1952. The new terminal building, finished in 1955, soon proved to be too small, and in 1960 it was decided to make Lungi a modern international airport. A new terminal building was erected to designs by Nickson & Borys and was officially opened on June 25, 1964. The building was expanded for the 1980 OAU summit.

The airport was operated by the Sierra Leone Airports Authority. In 2012 its management was contracted out to the British security and military company Westminster Aviation Security Services Ltd.

The government of Sierra Leone undertook a general upgrade of the terminal in 2010, in order to meet the basic standards of current international airports. The departure hall was commissioned in February 2013 and the arrival hall in May 2014.

From September 2014, almost all regional and intercontinental flights to Freetown were suspended as a result of the 2014 West Africa Ebola virus outbreak. During this crisis, Brussels Airlines was the only carrier to maintain its regular operations to the airport; catering almost exclusively to NGO health workers. The first airline to resume commercial flights after suspending them was Air Cote d'Ivoire in October 2014 while Air France announced it would resume services by June 2015. British Airways chose not to resume flights to Sierra Leone. A national airline Fly Salone operated briefly at the start of 2016. This was the first national airline to operate for more than 10 years after Sierra National Airlines stopped flying. After last having served Freetown in December 1996, KLM restarted flights in March 2017, but discontinued them in 2019. ASKY Airlines recommenced flights in November 2017.

A new international airport was planned at Mamamah to replace Lungi International Airport. Mamamah International Airport was expected to be operational by 2022. The project was cancelled in October 2018 following a change of government. The government Aviation Minister stated that they would refurbish Lungi instead and may build a bridge to better link the airport to Freetown. The Lungi Bridge project was announced by president Julius Maada Bio in 2019.

Following parliamentary approval in December 2020, a $270 million expansion project started. The project included a new passenger terminal, VIP terminal, taxiways and widening of the runway. The annual capacity was planned to be 1 million passengers and would be capable of handling 8 wide-body aircraft at any one time. The new terminal is located on the northern side of the runway, towards the eastern end. The new terminal was officially opened on 4 March 2023. A management agreement was signed with Summa Airport (SL) Ltd.

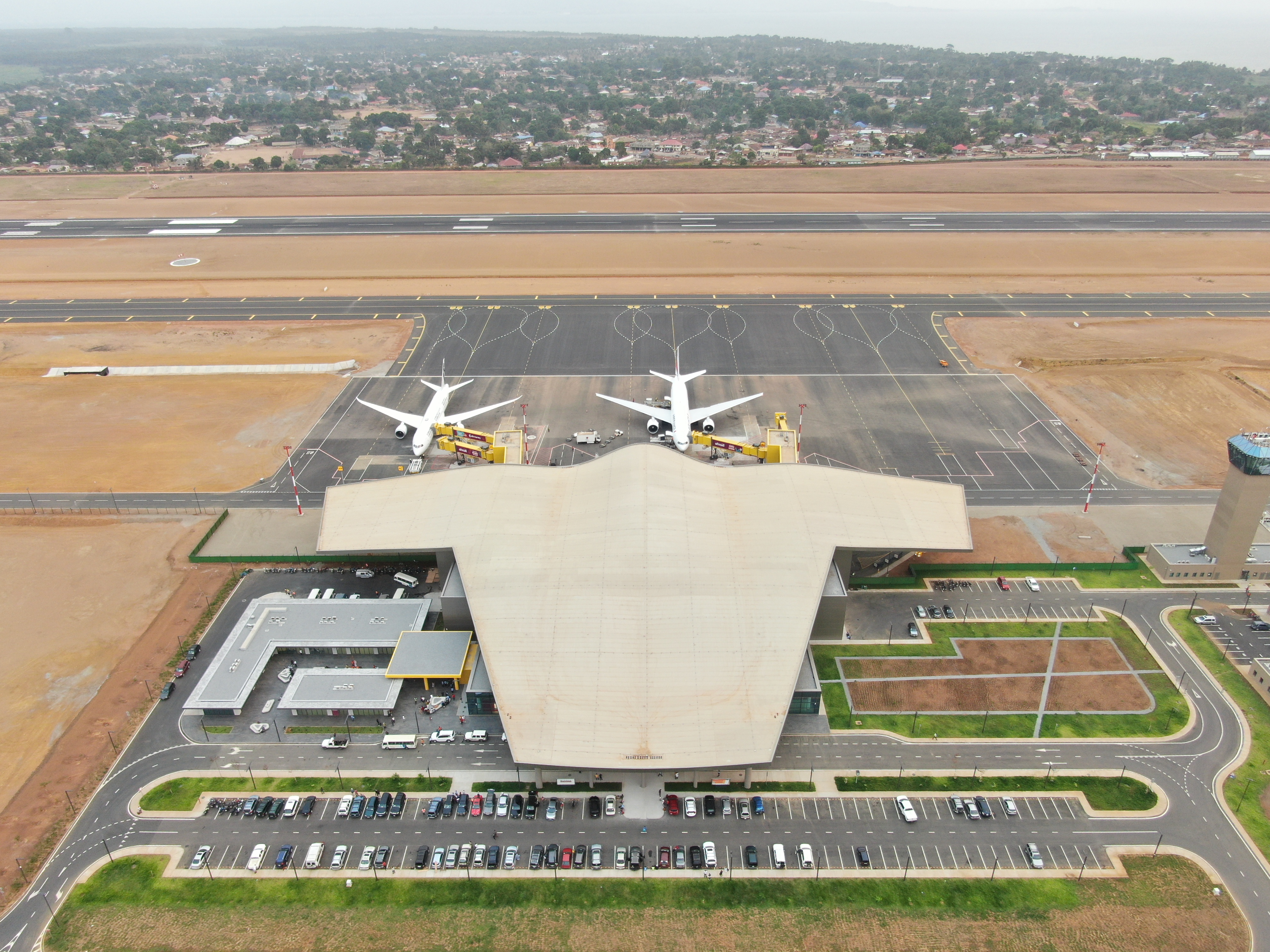
The new terminal, opened in 2023

== Access ==
Because the Lungi International Airport is across an estuary from the capital Freetown, passengers have the options of traveling from Freetown International Airport to Freetown through government ferry, private passenger water taxi speed boats and bus transportation. The water taxis are large boats, often with air conditioning and wifi. Most people who are traveling outside Freetown, and to other parts of Sierra Leone, use the highway through public or private transportation. The ferry is the cheapest, and the most common way of traveling from Lungi to Freetown for most Sierra Leoneans. The ferry takes about an hour by sea from Lungi to Freetown. The private water taxis take 30–40 minutes to Aberdeen, Murray Town or Government wharf.

Public and private transportation buses run from Lungi to Freetown, and to other parts of Sierra Leone. The highway road journey from Lungi to Freetown is generally three hours drive, but can be considerably more because of traffic in Freetown.

== Airlines and destinations ==
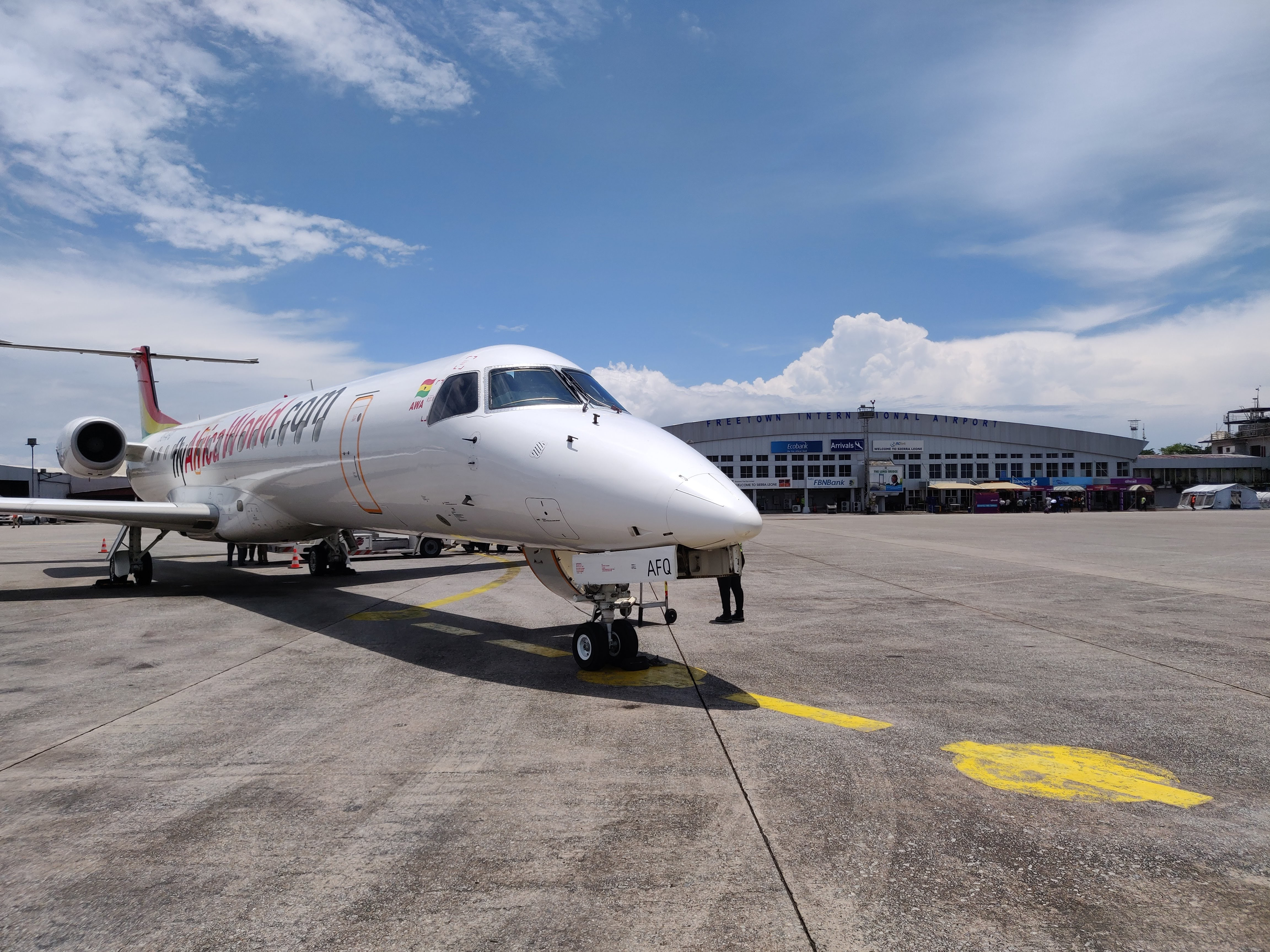
An Africa World Airlines aircraft at Lungi Airport

Airlines	Destinations
Air Peace	Lagos
Air Senegal	Dakar–Diass
Air Sierra Leone	Lagos, London–Gatwick
ASKY Airlines	Accra, Banjul, Conakry, Lomé
Brussels Airlines	Brussels, Monrovia–Roberts
Ethiopian Airlines	Addis Ababa, Monrovia–Roberts
Kenya Airways	Accra, Nairobi–Jomo Kenyatta
Royal Air Maroc	Casablanca
Turkish Airlines	Istanbul, Ouagadougou (all flights suspended)

== Accidents and incidents ==
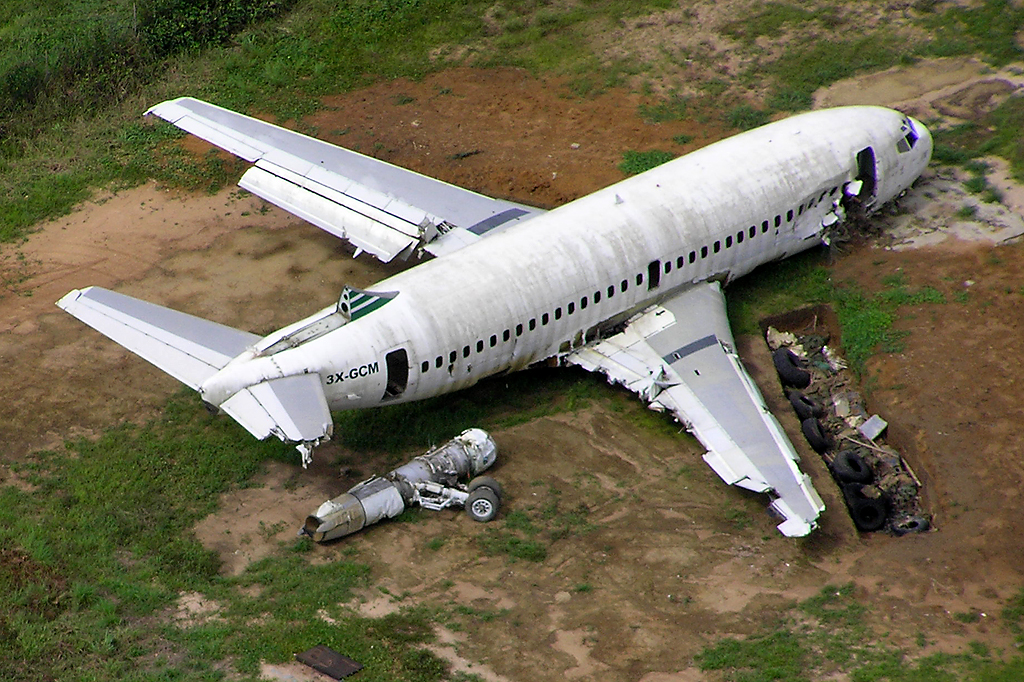
Wreckage of the Air Guinee Express aircraft

- On 11 August 2004 at around 2:30 p.m. a Boeing 737-200 operated by Air Guinee Express crashed while failing to take off at Lungi Airport. There were no fatalities among the 127 passengers and crew members.
- On 3 June 2007 a helicopter flight from Freetown exploded and crashed on landing at Lungi airport, killing all 22 people on board. The helicopter, a Russian Mi-8, was operated by Paramount Airlines, which shuttled passengers between Sierra Leone's coastal capital Freetown and Lungi airport.
- On 30 April 2017 a Brussels Airlines Airbus A330 landed at Lungi Airport after having lost a fairing at the wing root upon departure from Brussels. The aircraft was grounded for 48 hours to investigate and the Belgian Accident Investigation Board rated this as a "serious incident".
