= Sólyom Hungarian Airways =

2013 Hungarian airline start-up

IATA	ICAO	Call sign
—	HUN	HUNGARIAN
- Founded: 2013
- Ceased operations: 2013
- Hubs: Budapest Ferenc Liszt International Airport
- Destinations: n/a
- Headquarters: Budapest, Hungary
- Key people: János Lucsik, CEO

Sólyom Hungarian Airways Ltd. (Hungarian pronunciation: [ˈʃoːjom], Hungarian for "falcon") was a Hungarian airline start-up with its head office at Budapest Ferenc Liszt International Airport. It was founded in 2013 after Malév Hungarian Airlines, the former flag carrier of Hungary, ceased operations in February 2012. It never started operations.

== History ==
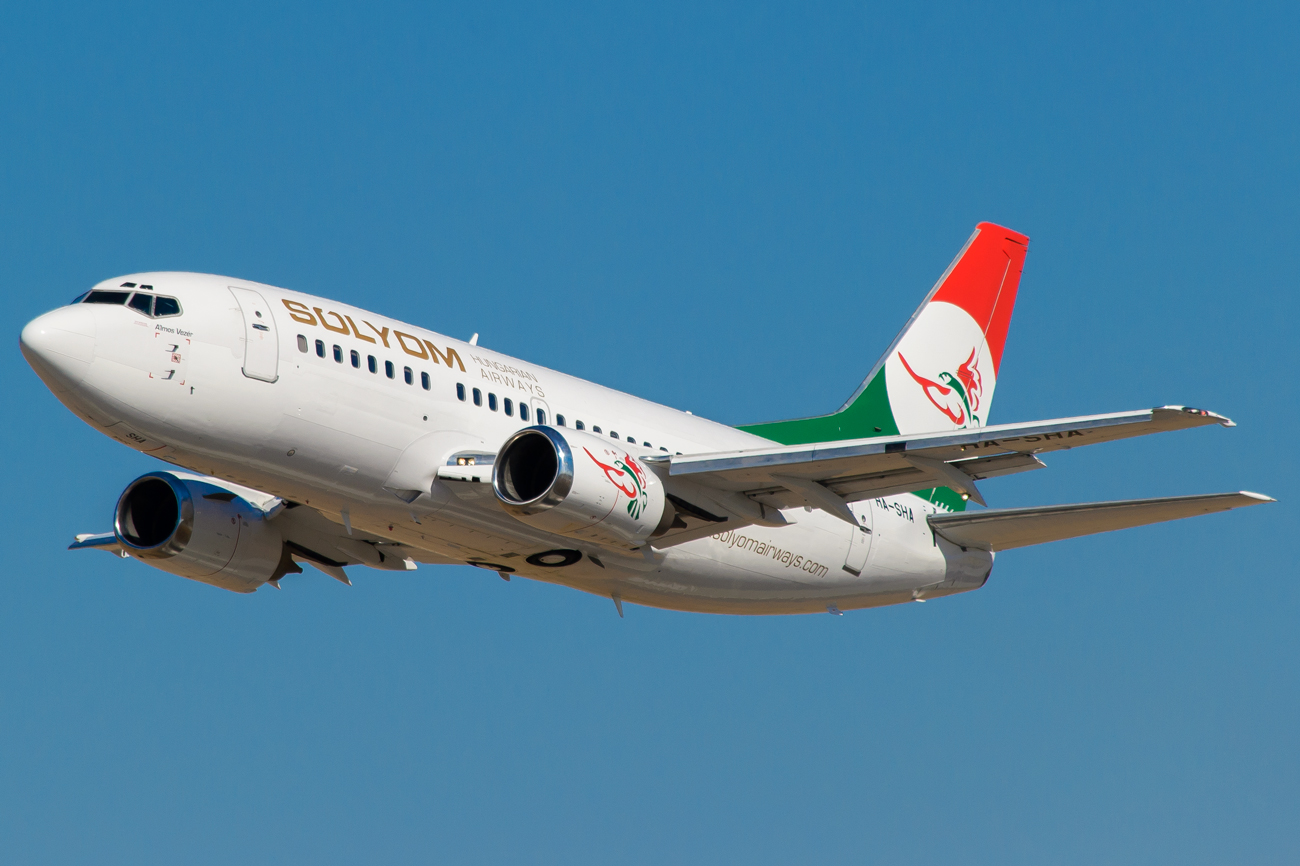
Sólyom Hungarian Airways Boeing 737-500

Operations were due to start in August 2013 but at a press conference on 18 August, the CEO, József Vágó, announced that charter flights would begin in September and scheduled flights in October 2013. On October 10, 2013, the management of the company told to all their employees that they were unable to pay the salaries which were due to be transferred on the same day. They also said that they were unable to finalize the deal with potential investors from Oman.

After a widely publicised bankruptcy, on October 30 communications director Tamás Hévizi called for speculation to die down while the appropriate permits were obtained but unexpectedly on November 10, 2013, Sólyom was sold by managing director Hurtyák Róbert to new owners "Charity March" (a Hungarian organization based in Africa) for three million forints. Charity March's head, Tamás Welsz, said that talks about the takeover had been ongoing for a month. In an interview the former owner of Sólyom, Lucsik János, said he did not know Welsz and had only met him twice in his life. He also said that he did not know about the sale until it had happened and that he was unable to dispute Hurtyák's decision to sell the company when Lucsik János himself had made a decision to declare insolvency. Flights were expected to launch by December with the two existing planes but further issues arose when it emerged that Welsz and his wife were wanted by both Panama and Interpol on charges of fraud and forgery of legal documents and traveled back to Hungary during a travel ban. On March 21, 2014, it was reported that Charity March's head, Tamás Welsz, who took over Sólyom, took his own life as police searched his house.

On April 16, 2014, the airline announced that operations will commence, and that they are again seeking investors, albeit with a revised business plan. It was also announced by the company that their debts had by now (22 April 2014) been reduced by 80%, the wages of 82 former employees had now been paid and that they currently have 27 employees.

Solyom Airways currently has a series of approved 'manuals, procedures and certificates' including a renewed AOC (for aircraft below 5700 kg) and a Part 145 License. The airline is currently seeking funding and a full AOC to enable flights on their leased Boeing 737.

As of 2022, the company has never acquired the AOC, never carried passengers and never owned a fleet. Their only airworthly chartered aircraft, a Boeing 737-500 (registration HA-SHA), was scrapped in 2018. Although it has been inactive since 2015, the company is still registered as active in Budapest.

== Destinations ==
Under its initial management the airline revealed its planned destinations from Budapest as follows: Amsterdam, Brussels, Frankfurt, London, Milan, Paris and Stockholm. By the end of 2014, the airline had sought to add flights to North America and China. Having changed management and with revised ambitions no updated plans have been revealed.

== Fleet ==
The airline had one airworthy (certified) Boeing 737-500 aircraft, HA-SHA (MSN 24648), on lease. As of 27 October 2018 it was seen at Kemble Cotswold Airport Scrap Line in partially disassembled state. The first aircraft, a Boeing 737-500 HA-SHC (MSN 24274), left the company before receiving engines and on 16 May 2014 was resprayed by Airbourne Colours Ltd into a new livery for its new owner.
