= Fly Salone =

Airline

IATA	ICAO	Call sign
5L	?	?
- Founded: 2014
- Commenced operations: 11 December 2015
- Ceased operations: 18 March 2016
- Operating bases: Gatwick Airport (London)
- Fleet size: 1
- Destinations: 2
- Key people: Jay Saleh, chairman Struan Johnston, aviation specialist & responsible for strategy and operations.
- Website: fly-salone.com (archived)

Fly Salone was an airline based in the United Kingdom that operated scheduled and charter flights between London and Freetown, Sierra Leone. The airline conducted its first flight on 11 December 2015. On 17 March 2016, Fly Salone announced it had ceased trading and operated its last flight the following day.

== History ==
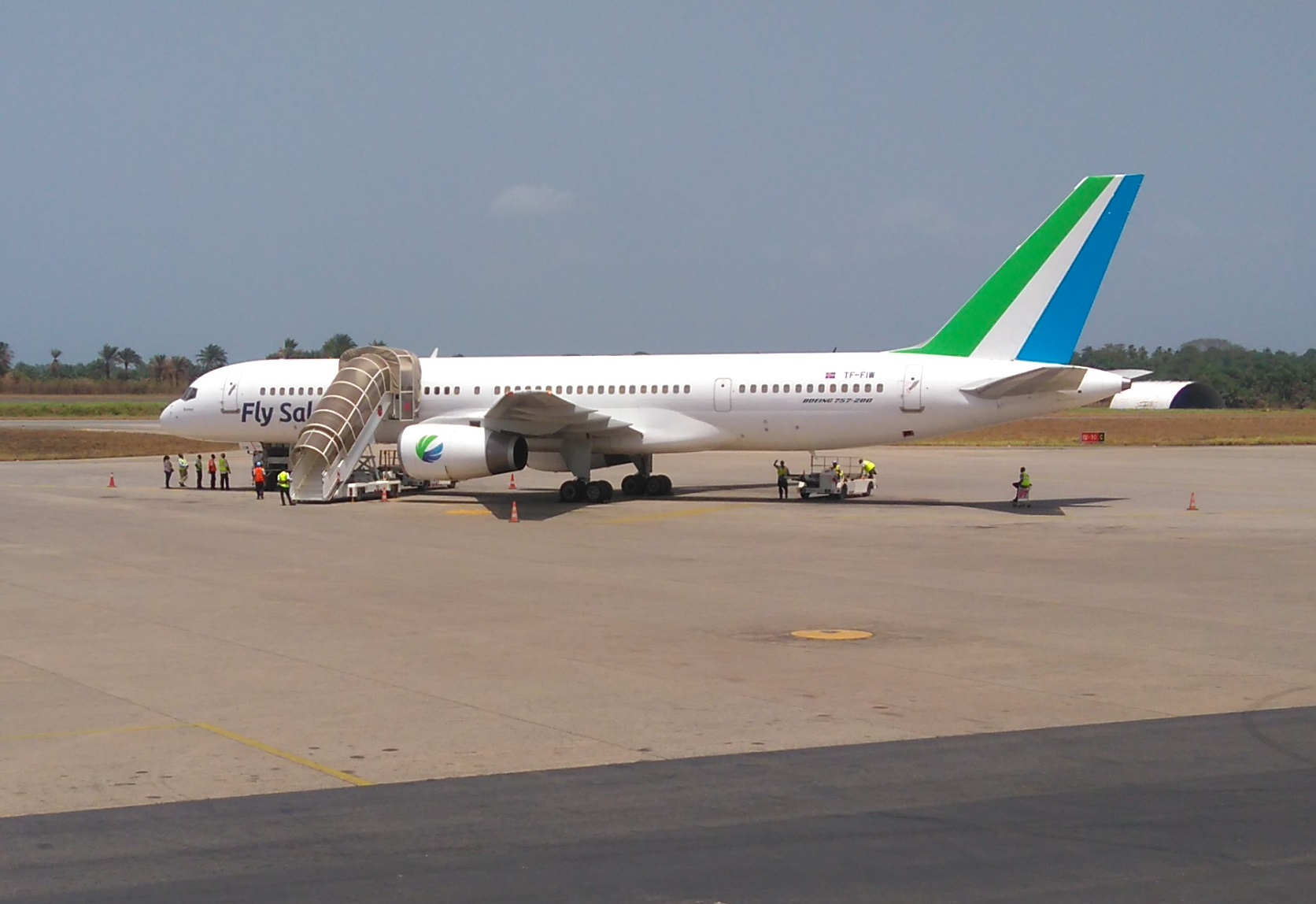
Boeing 757-200 at Lungi Airport, 2016

Fly Salone was created in response to British Airways' suspension of nonstop flights from London Heathrow Airport to Freetown in August 2014, in the wake of the Ebola virus epidemic in West Africa. In November 2015 the World Health Organization declared Sierra Leone free of Ebola, and in early December the UK Civil Aviation Authority lifted its ban on flights to the country. The airline was registered in the United Kingdom but served as the flag carrier of Sierra Leone. The management team was entirely Sierra Leonean.

On 11 December 2015, the airline operated its first flight, departing London Gatwick Airport at night and arriving in Freetown Lungi International Airport the following morning. Flights operated twice a week using a Boeing 757 leased from Icelandair.

On 17 March 2016, Fly Salone announced it had ceased trading and would soon go into liquidation. No reasons were provided. The airline operated its final flight, from Freetown to London, the following day. The collapse of Fly Salone also caused the UK travel operator Kevin McPhillips Travel to cease trading. McPhillips Travel had been behind most direct flight operations between the UK and Sierra Leone for more than 20 years.

== Destinations ==
At the time it ceased operations, Fly Salone was flying to the following destinations:

Country	City	Airport	Notes
Sierra Leone	Freetown	Lungi International Airport	—
United Kingdom	London	Gatwick Airport	Base

== Fleet ==
Prior to its collapse, Fly Salone operated a single Boeing 757-200 aircraft, leased from Icelandair.

== See also ==
- Transport in Sierra Leone
- List of defunct airlines of the United Kingdom
