= Eagle Air (Guinea) =

Eagle Air S.A.
IATA	ICAO	Call sign
-	EGR	EAGLE SIERRA
- Hubs: Conakry International Airport
- Focus cities: Nzérékoré, Kankan, Freetown, Monrovia, Bamako,
- Fleet size: 1 LET 410-UVP Twin Turbine Aircraft
- Destinations: 9+
- Parent company: Eagle Air S.A.
- Headquarters: Conakry, Guinea
- Website: Eagle Air Website

Eagle Air is a Guinean airline based at the Conakry International Airport in Conakry, Guinea. It operates charter flights within Guinea. The seventeen seat Let 410-Turbolet aircraft may be chartered for flights from Guinea to Monrovia, Liberia, Sierra Leone, Dakar, Senegal and Banjul, The Gambia amongst other destinations across Western Africa.

On June 24, 2018, Eagle Air lost one of its 2 Let L-410UVP in an accident near Souguéta, Guinea, in bad weather conditions. All 4 occupants were killed.

== Fleet ==
- 1x LET 410

== Destinations ==
=== Gambia ===
- Banjul

=== Guinea ===
- Nzérékoré
- Kankan
- Kindia
- Labé
- other domestic destinations

=== Liberia ===
- Monrovia

=== Mali ===
- Bamako

=== Senegal ===
- Dakar

=== Sierra Leone ===
- Freetown
