= Level (airline) =

Spanish low-cost airline

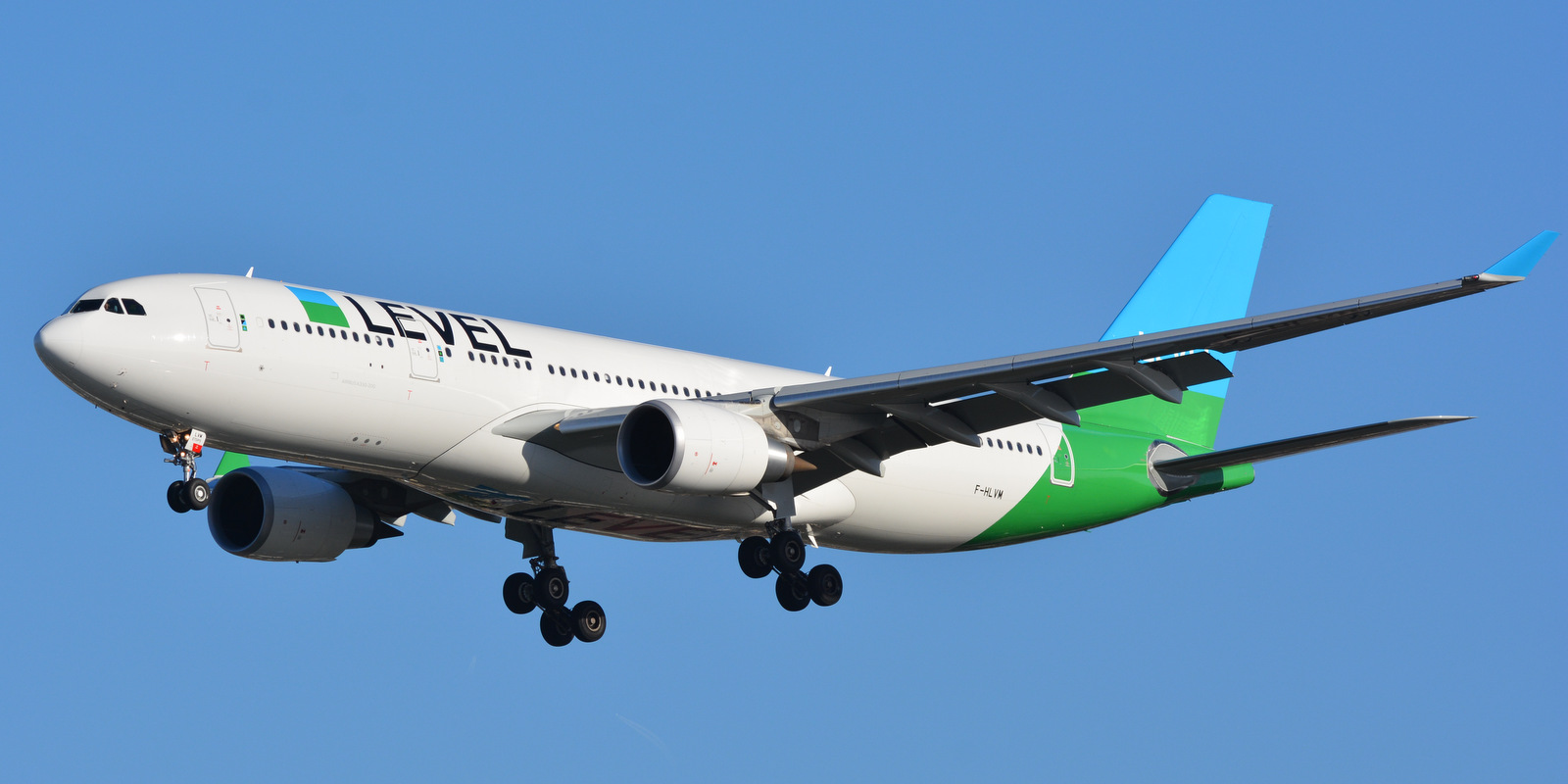
- Level A330-200 in standard livery
| IATA | ICAO | Call sign |
|---|---|---|
| LL | LVL | DALI |
- Founded: 15 March 2017; 9 years ago
- Commenced operations: 1 June 2017; 9 years ago
- AOC #: ES.AOC.166
- Operating bases: Josep Tarradellas Barcelona–El Prat Airport
- Frequent-flyer program: Avios
- Fleet size: 7
- Destinations: 26
- Parent company: International Airlines Group (IAG)
- Headquarters: Viladecans, Spain
- Key people: Rafael Jiménez Hoyos (CEO); Luis Gallego (CEO of IAG)
- Website: www.flylevel.com

Fly Level SL, styled as LEVEL, is a Spanish low cost airline owned by the International Airlines Group (IAG). The airline has a registered office in Viladecans, Spain.

Level was initially launched as an airline brand, with low-cost, long-haul flights operated by Iberia, and began transatlantic services from Barcelona–El Prat Airport in June 2017. In July 2018, Level expanded with long-haul services from Paris Orly Airport, taking over the operations of IAG subsidiary OpenSkies, and began its first short-haul services from Vienna International Airport, operated by Level Europe.

On 18 June 2020, Level Europe entered insolvency and the brand's short-haul flights operated by the Austria-based airline were terminated with immediate effect. On 8 July 2020, the shutdown of OpenSkies was announced and initially ended the brand's long-haul flights based at Paris Orly, and although ticket sales for OpenSkies flights under the brand were later restarted, operations did not resume. The brand's long-haul flights from Barcelona operated by Iberia were unaffected by Level Europe's and OpenSkies' closures.

IAG later confirmed plans to acquire an independent air operator's certificate (AOC) for Level, enabling it to operate as a standalone airline within the group, before obtaining its AOC in December 2024. In March 2025, IAG confirmed that Iberia had assumed 50.1% ownership of Level allowing it to meet majority EU ownership requirements.

== History ==
=== Initial launch as a brand ===
Level was established by IAG in response to increased competition in the low-cost long-haul market, including that of Norwegian Long Haul. On 15 March 2017, IAG CEO Willie Walsh announced the new brand, together with four destinations launching in June 2017 from Barcelona–El Prat Airport (later renamed after Josep Tarradellas in 2019). These were Oakland, Los Angeles, Buenos Aires, and Punta Cana. Walsh further noted that the brand was launched a year ahead of schedule. A one-year contract was in place for Iberia to operate Level flights under its airline codes and provide the necessary personnel, which was subsequently extended as Level had still not been issued its own air operator's certificate (AOC) the following year.

Walsh stated the corporation due to take over operation of the brand sold 52,000 seats within two days of being established, and over 147,000 after one and a half months, far exceeding IAG's expectations. Rome, Paris, and Milan were also mentioned as possible locations for future expansion of the airline in Europe, together with additional routes out of Barcelona.

=== Long-haul expansion ===
In line with the expressed intent to continue with future expansion by adding routes from other European cities, on 28 November 2017, Level announced flights from Paris Orly Airport to Montreal and Point-à-Pitre and flights from Barcelona to Boston to begin from July 2018, and flights from Paris Orly to Fort-de-France and Newark to begin from September 2018. Flights from Paris Orly were to be operated with the AOC and crew of OpenSkies, another airline owned by IAG.

After the OpenSkies brand was retired on 2 September 2018, its operations were absorbed into the Level brand. On 8 November 2018, flights from Barcelona to Santiago de Chile and New York JFK were announced to begin in March and July 2019 respectively. On 8 May 2019, a service from Paris to Las Vegas was announced to begin from 30 October 2019, which was subsequently terminated by 1 March 2020. On 1 October 2019, a service between Paris Orly and Boston was announced to begin from 31 March 2020, but reservations were later closed between the initial announcement and the planned start of service.

OpenSkies was among three airlines that applied with the French Ministry of Ecology for traffic rights to operate services between France and Brazil, following the relinquishment of airport slots and traffic rights by Aigle Azur and XL Airways France, which had gone defunct during September 2019. Of the five weekly frequencies made available between France and Brazil, OpenSkies applied to operate three weekly services between Paris Orly and Rio de Janeiro under the Level brand, with the intention of eventually using all five frequencies, but was unable to provide a specific operational timeline for when it would increase service. By January 2020, none of the traffic rights were awarded to OpenSkies, with the French Ministry of Ecology instead awarding four frequencies to French Bee, and one frequency to Air France.

The COVID-19 pandemic and its associated impacts on aviation resulted in the grounding of Level's short- and long-haul fleet, and the subsequent suspension of its operations starting in March 2020. On 8 July 2020, IAG announced that OpenSkies, the operator of Level's flights based at Paris Orly, would cease operations, with employee union negotiations and further closing procedures to begin the following week. Despite the announcement of OpenSkies' closure, ticket sales for Paris Orly-based flights operated by the airline were restarted, with operations planned to resume in October 2020, later postponed to December 2020, yet operations never resumed and ticket sales were subsequently closed completely. Level's long-haul flights that were based in Barcelona and operated by Iberia resumed on 11 September 2020, with reduced capacity. As travel restrictions between countries continued to be lifted, Level launched a new route between its Barcelona base and Cancún International Airport on 2 July 2021. In the following months, it announced in September 2021 that its Punta Cana services would resume on 4 December 2021, and in October 2021 that it would resume its services to Los Angeles on 28 March 2022. On 19 September 2023, Level announced plans to increase its fleet to six aircraft, and with it, a new service between Barcelona and Miami International Airport to begin on 31 March 2024.

=== Short-haul expansion ===
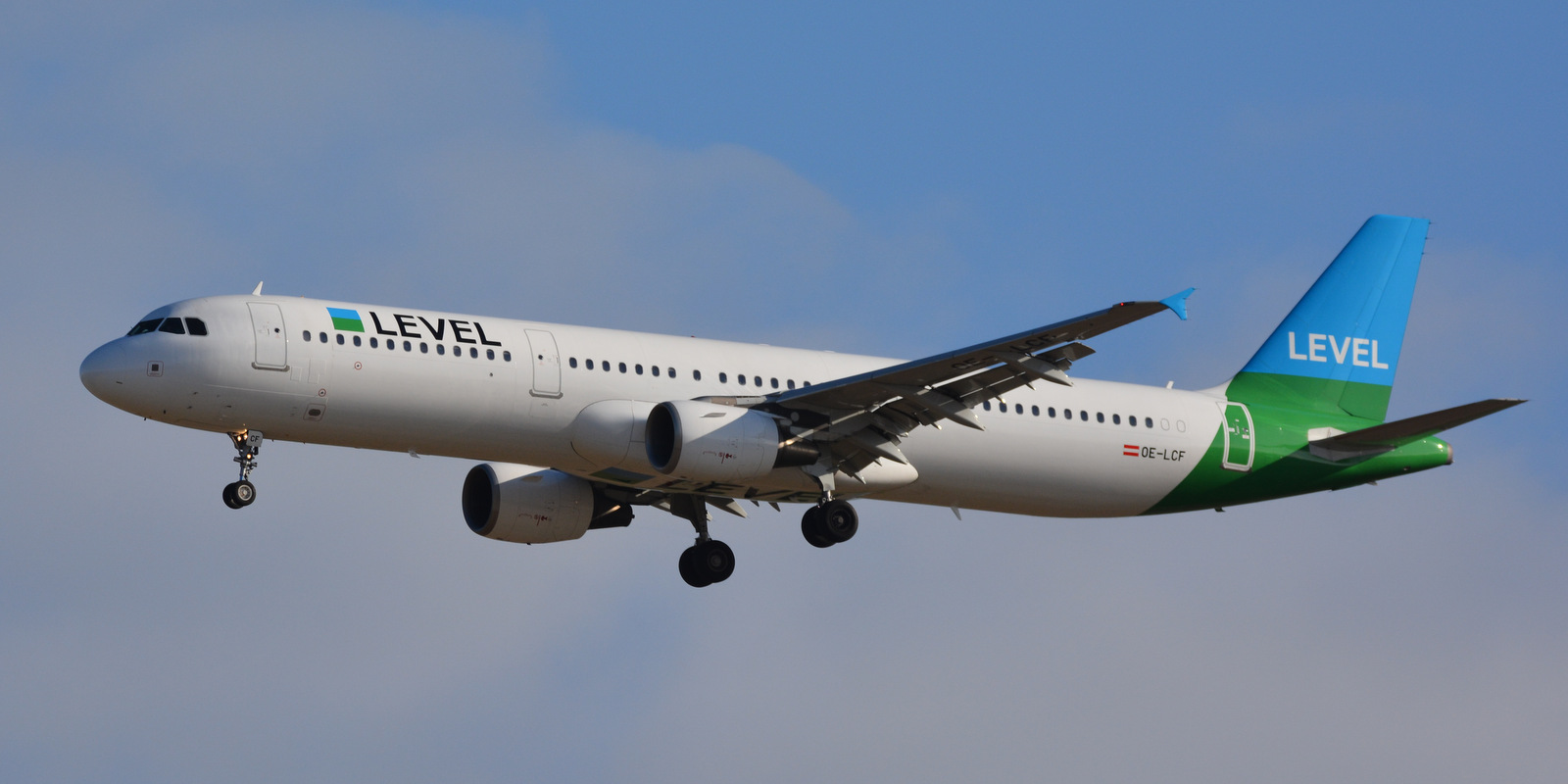
A former Level Airbus A321-200 used on since discontinued short-haul routes from Amsterdam and Vienna (2019).

On 29 June 2018, IAG announced the launch of a new low-cost Austrian subsidiary, Anisec Luftfahrt, to operate flights from Vienna International Airport, branded as Level, starting from 17 July 2018. The new subsidiary had its own Austrian AOC and based four Airbus A321 aircraft previously used by Air Berlin and Niki in Vienna, from which it planned to serve 14 European destinations on behalf of Level by the end of August 2018. By December 2018, however, Level announced cuts to its Vienna route network, with routes being reduced in frequency or cancelled altogether due to business figures being below expectations.

On 14 March 2019, IAG confirmed plans to open a second base at Amsterdam Airport Schiphol, with seven routes already operated by Vueling transferred from 6 April 2019 to 15 August 2019. Routes once transferred were planned to be operated under the Level brand by Anisec Luftfahrt, with three Airbus A320 aircraft transferred from Vueling to Level in March 2019. On 18 June 2019, during the 2019 Paris Air Show, the International Airlines Group signed a letter of intent to order a total of 200 Boeing 737 MAX 8 and MAX 10 aircraft to be operated across IAG's airlines, possibly including the Level brand, Vueling, and British Airways, although specific allocation amounts between operating airlines were not specified. In December 2019, Anisec Luftfahrt was renamed Level Europe.

On 18 June 2020, all short-haul flights operated by Level Europe from its bases in Amsterdam and Vienna were terminated as the operating company went into liquidation.

=== Transformation from brand to airline ===
On 21 November 2023, IAG announced that Level would receive its own AOC, allowing for the company to operate its own flights independently of other IAG-owned airlines, which Level's flights had been operated by since launch. Level received its own AOC on 3 December 2024, and was assigned the IATA code "LL", however the airline would continue to use the "IB" code from Iberia prior to transitioning to its own code during 2025.

== Corporate affairs ==
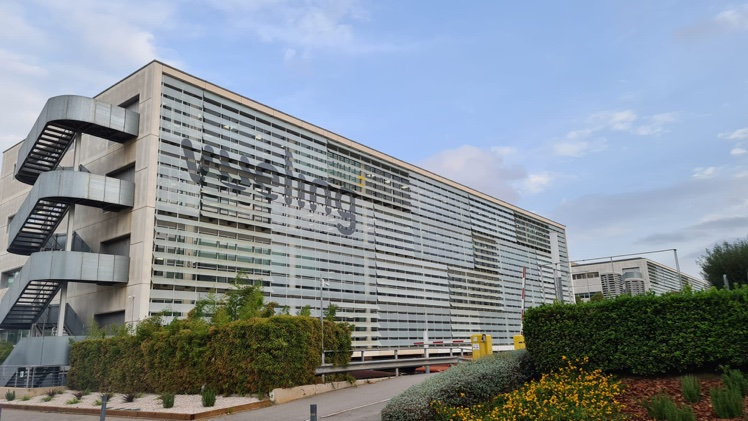
Level's head office is at Vueling's head office in Viladecans

Level is currently headquartered in Viladecans, Spain. Previously, the company had a registered office in Madrid, Spain, using space shared with Spanish airline Iberia, which is located on the grounds of Adolfo Suárez Madrid–Barajas Airport. The brand has additional offices on the grounds of Josep Tarradellas Barcelona–El Prat Airport, shared with Spanish low-cost airline Vueling.

Level initially lacked a chief executive officer (CEO) following its launch in 2017, according to former International Airlines Group CEO Willie Walsh. In turn, Vincent Hodder, who had previous experience at British regional airline Flybe, became Level's first CEO on 25 July 2018. Hodder was later succeeded as CEO by Fernando Candela on 9 September 2019, who had previous experience at Spanish airlines Iberia Express and Air Nostrum. Candela was succeeded by Rafael Jiménez Hoyos, whose appointment as company CEO was announced on 12 September 2024.

== Destinations ==
As of March 2025, the airlines operating for Level serve, or have previously served, the following destinations.

=== Long-haul destinations ===
Starting in March 2017, long-haul flights under the brand were launched from a base at Barcelona–El Prat Airport, with the flights operated by Iberia. Starting in July 2018, long-haul flights under the brand based at Paris Orly Airport were operated by OpenSkies until March 2020 due to the COVID-19 pandemic, after which IAG announced the closure of OpenSkies in July 2020.

| Country or Territory | City | Airport | Notes | Refs |
|---|---|---|---|---|
| Argentina | Buenos Aires | Ministro Pistarini International Airport | | |
| Canada | Montréal | Montréal–Trudeau International Airport | Terminated | |
| Chile | Santiago | Arturo Merino Benítez International Airport | | |
| Dominican Republic | Punta Cana | Punta Cana International Airport | Terminated | |
| France | Paris | Orly Airport | Terminated | |
| Guadeloupe | Pointe-à-Pitre | Pointe-à-Pitre International Airport | Terminated | |
| Martinique | Fort-de-France | Martinique Aimé Césaire International Airport | Terminated | |
| Mexico | Cancún | Cancún International Airport | Terminated | |
| Spain | Barcelona | Josep Tarradellas Barcelona–El Prat Airport | Base | |
| United States | Boston | Logan International Airport | | |
| United States | Las Vegas | Harry Reid International Airport | Terminated | |
| United States | Los Angeles | Los Angeles International Airport | | |
| United States | Miami | Miami International Airport | | |
| United States | New York City | John F. Kennedy International Airport | | |
| United States | Newark | Newark Liberty International Airport | Terminated | |
| United States | Oakland | Oakland International Airport | Terminated | |
| United States | San Francisco | San Francisco International Airport | Seasonal | |

=== Short-haul destinations ===
Short-haul flights were operated under the brand by Anisec Luftfahrt (later renamed Level Europe) between July 2018 and March 2020, when operations were initially suspended due to the COVID-19 pandemic. On 18 June 2020, Level Europe went into administration, resulting in all short-haul flights within Europe under the Level brand being terminated with immediate effect. The following table shows the status of each current, former, or planned destination at the time Level Europe's operations were suspended in March 2020, before the airline's official ceasing of operations in June 2020.

| Country | City | Airport | Notes | Refs |
|---|---|---|---|---|
| Austria | Linz | Linz Airport | Terminated | |
| Austria | Salzburg | Salzburg Airport | Seasonal | |
| Austria | Vienna | Vienna International Airport | Base | |
| Croatia | Dubrovnik | Dubrovnik Airport | Terminated | |
| Cyprus | Larnaca | Larnaca International Airport | Seasonal | |
| Denmark | Copenhagen | Copenhagen Airport | Terminated | |
| France | Calvi | Calvi – Sainte-Catherine Airport | Seasonal | |
| France | Paris | Charles de Gaulle Airport | | |
| Germany | Hamburg | Hamburg Airport | Terminated | |
| Germany | Memmingen | Memmingen Airport | Seasonal; Was to begin 17 May 2020 | |
| Germany | Rostock | Rostock Airport | Seasonal | |
| Italy | Genoa | Genoa Cristoforo Colombo Airport | Seasonal | |
| Italy | Milan | Milan Malpensa Airport | | |
| Italy | Olbia | Olbia Costa Smeralda Airport | Terminated | |
| Italy | Rome | Rome Fiumicino Airport | | |
| Italy | Venice | Venice Marco Polo Airport | Terminated | |
| Netherlands | Amsterdam | Amsterdam Airport Schiphol | Base | |
| Portugal | Lisbon | Lisbon Airport | | |
| Portugal | Porto | Porto Airport | Terminated | |
| Spain | Alicante | Alicante–Elche Airport | | |
| Spain | Barcelona | Josep Tarradellas Barcelona–El Prat Airport | | |
| Spain | Bilbao | Bilbao Airport | Seasonal | |
| Spain | Fuerteventura | Fuerteventura Airport | | |
| Spain | Ibiza | Ibiza Airport | Terminated | |
| Spain | Málaga | Málaga Airport | Seasonal | |
| Spain | Palma de Mallorca | Palma de Mallorca Airport | Seasonal | |
| Spain | Seville | Seville Airport | Terminated | |
| Spain | Valencia | Valencia Airport | Terminated | |
| United Kingdom | London | Gatwick Airport | Terminated | |
| United Kingdom | London | London Luton Airport | Terminated | |

=== Codeshare agreements ===
As of October 2021, the airlines operating for Level have codeshare agreements with the following airlines:

- Alaska Airlines
- American Airlines
- British Airways
- Iberia
- Qatar Airways
- Vueling

== Fleet ==
=== Current fleet ===
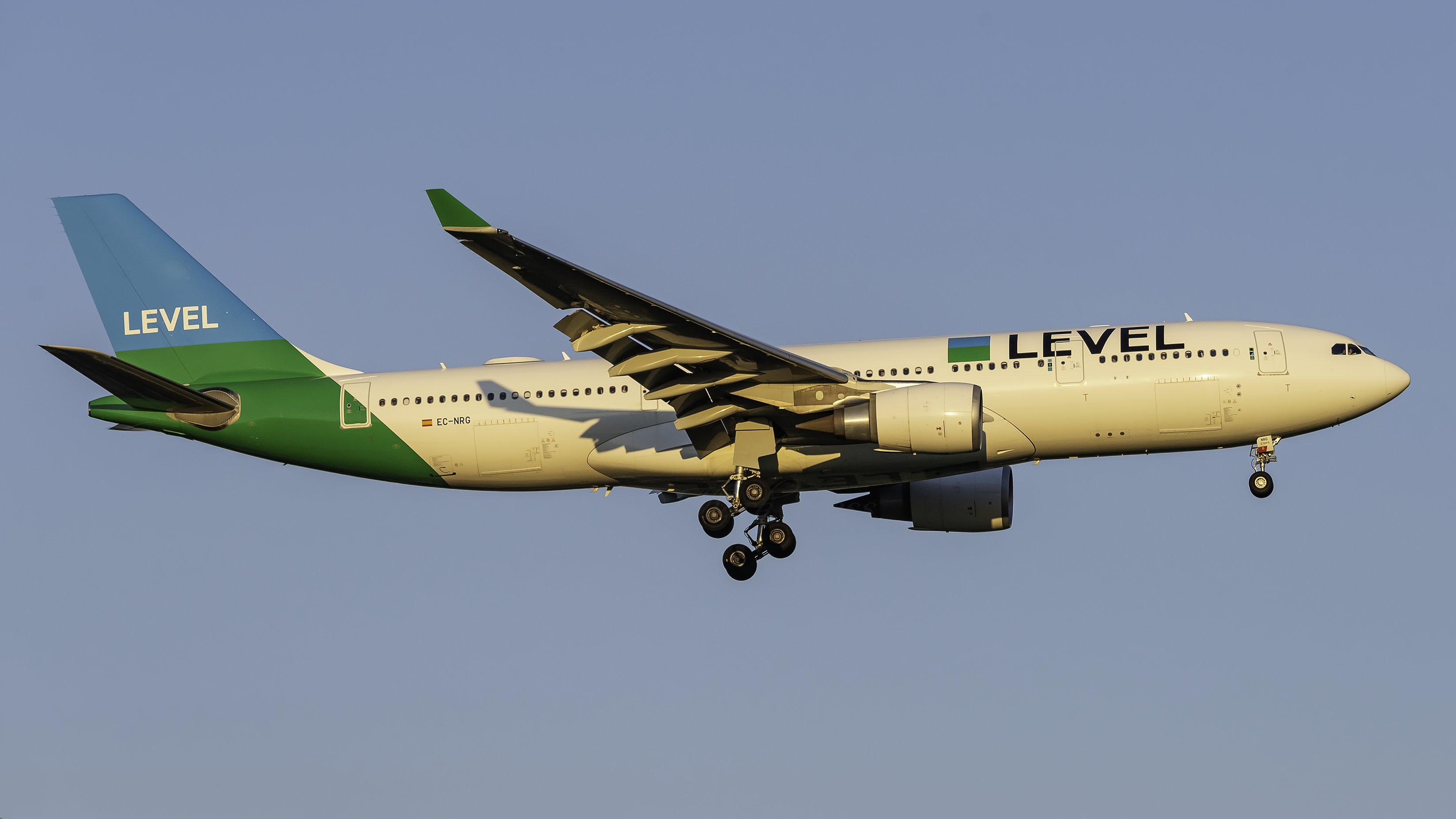
Level Airbus A330-200

As of May 2025, Level operates an all-Airbus A330 fleet composed of the following aircraft:

Level fleet
| Aircraft | In service | Orders | Passengers | | | Notes |
| Aircraft | In service | Orders | W | Y | Total | Notes |
|---|---|---|---|---|---|---|
| Airbus A330-200 | 4 | — | 42 | 269 | 311 | Operated by Iberia. |
| Airbus A330-200 | 2 | — | 24 | 275 | 299 | Operated by Iberia. |
| Airbus A330-200 | 1 | — | 20 | 255 | 275 | Operated by Iberia. |
| Total | 7 | — | | | | |

=== Fleet development ===
The brand announced plans to expand from three Airbus A330-200s in 2017 to at least 15 aircraft by 2022, with the possibility of continuing to acquire Airbus A330s, or possibly moving to Boeing 787s. The brand later stated it was to decide between the Boeing 787 or the Airbus A330neo for its future wide-body fleet plans, as production of the Airbus A330-200 was expected to end in early 2020.

In June 2018, four branded Airbus A321-200 aircraft were added to begin short-haul services before another two Airbus A320-200 aircraft were added starting from March 2019, from the three A320s originally planned to be added. Three additional Airbus A330-200 aircraft operated by OpenSkies were added to the fleet starting in July 2018. In June 2020, the Airbus A320 and A321 aircraft were subsequently retired after Level Europe, the airline responsible for operating short-haul flights under the brand, ceased operations. The following month, OpenSkies ceased operations and its three Airbus A330-200s were transferred to Iberia starting in January 2021, with at least one of the three aircraft repurposed to operate from Level's Barcelona base.

Following the impacts of the COVID-19 pandemic, in November 2023, IAG announced plans for Level's fleet to increase to eight aircraft by 2026. On 9 May 2025, IAG ordered up to 76 aircraft from Airbus and Boeing, out of which 32 firm orders and 10 options for the Boeing 787-10 will be allocated to British Airways, and 21 firm orders and 13 options for the Airbus A330-900 will be allocated to Level, Aer Lingus and Iberia.

== Cabins and services ==
=== Premium Economy ===
Premium Economy on Level's A330 aircraft features 42 reclining seats in a 2–3–2 layout, each featuring 37 inches (94 cm) of pitch and including noise-cancelling headphones. Seats have a 12-inch (31 cm) TV screen featuring a complimentary selection of films, TV shows, and music. Passengers are offered a three-course meal, and Wi-Fi is available for purchase. Passengers are also given a baggage allowance of one cabin bag and two checked/hold bags.

=== Economy ===
The Economy cabin of Level's A330 aircraft features 293 seats in a 2–4–2 layout, which are equipped with a 9-inch (23 cm) TV screen. In-flight Wi-Fi, in-flight catering, and checked/hold baggage are all available for purchase by passengers.

== Frequent-flyer programme ==
Level flights operated by Iberia can earn Avios points via the Iberia Plus programme. It is not clear how the planned switch to operations under Level's own AOC will affect the earning and redemption of Avios on Level flights. Former flights operated by Level Europe or OpenSkies were never eligible to earn Avios points on any programme.
