= Álex Cruz (businessman) =

Spanish businessman (born 1966)

- Born: Álex Cruz de Llano; 1966 (age 59–60); Bilbao, Spain
- Education: Central Michigan University; Ohio State University (MSc)
- Occupation: Businessman
- Employer(s): British Airways; International Airlines Group
- Title: Former CEO of British Airways
- Term: 2016–2020
- Predecessor: Keith Williams
- Successor: Sean Doyle
- Children: 4

Álex Cruz de Llano (born 1966) is a Spanish businessman who is known as the former chairman and chief executive officer (CEO) of British Airways and former CEO of Vueling.

== Early life ==
Cruz was born and grew up in Bilbao, in the Spanish province of Biscay. He studied engineering at Central Michigan University in Mount Pleasant, Michigan from 1984 to 1988. He gained an MSc from Ohio State University in Columbus, Ohio, studying there from 1988 to 1990. In 1993, he attended an executive education program at Cox School of Business at Southern Methodist University in Dallas, Texas, while he was working for American Airlines.

== Career ==
=== Vueling ===
In summer 2006, Cruz became the founding CEO of Clickair, a low-cost airline. This became part of Vueling in July 2009; Spain's second-largest airline with 163 destinations.

=== British Airways ===
In November 2015, Cruz was hired by the CEO of International Airlines Group, Willie Walsh, as the next CEO and chairman of British Airways, to begin in April 2016. International Airlines Group, the owner of British Airways, also owns Vueling. Cruz succeeded Keith Williams.

In 2016 Cruz made 700 British Airways employees redundant when he closed down the airline's computer department. He then outsourced the company's computer systems to the Indian company Tata Consultancy Services, drawing negative comment from a trade unionist. On 7 September 2018, British Airways announced that their online reservation systems had been accessed by an unauthorised third party. Between 21 August 2018 and 5 September 2018, the sensitive data of more than 420,000 British Airways customers was compromised. Initially, BA was fined £183 million by the Information Commissioner’s Office – a regulator – for the breach. However, in October 2020 a decision was granted to levy the fine, reducing it to £20 million.

In 2019 Álex Cruz de Llano oversaw the successful beginning of a UK air service to Pakistan, making it the first Western airline in the country for ten years.

On the environmental impact of aviation, he said in August 2019 that British Airways and its competitors had to start "thinking about flying in different ways".

In April 2020, during the global collapse in air travel brought along by the COVID-19 pandemic, he told British Airways' staff that he had set out plans to make up to 12,000 of them redundant. Unite the Union decried the move as "heartless", saying "to reject government support but then expect their own staff to pay the cost... is irresponsible, dangerous and destructive".

On 12 October 2020, it was announced that Sean Doyle, CEO of Aer Lingus (also part of International Airlines Group (IAG)) would succeed Cruz as CEO of British Airways. The move was carried out by IAG's new CEO Luis Gallego. There was a transition period in which he remained as non-executive chairman at British Airways in the run-up to Doyle also taking over that role in April 2021.

=== Port Aventura ===
Since December 2021, Cruz is an executive member of the board of directors of PortAventura World.

== Personal life ==
He is married with four children, and lives in North London.

Business positions
Preceded by Keith Williams	CEO of British Airways; 2016–2020	Succeeded by Sean Doyle
