= Luis Gallego (businessman) =

Spanish businessman (born 1968)

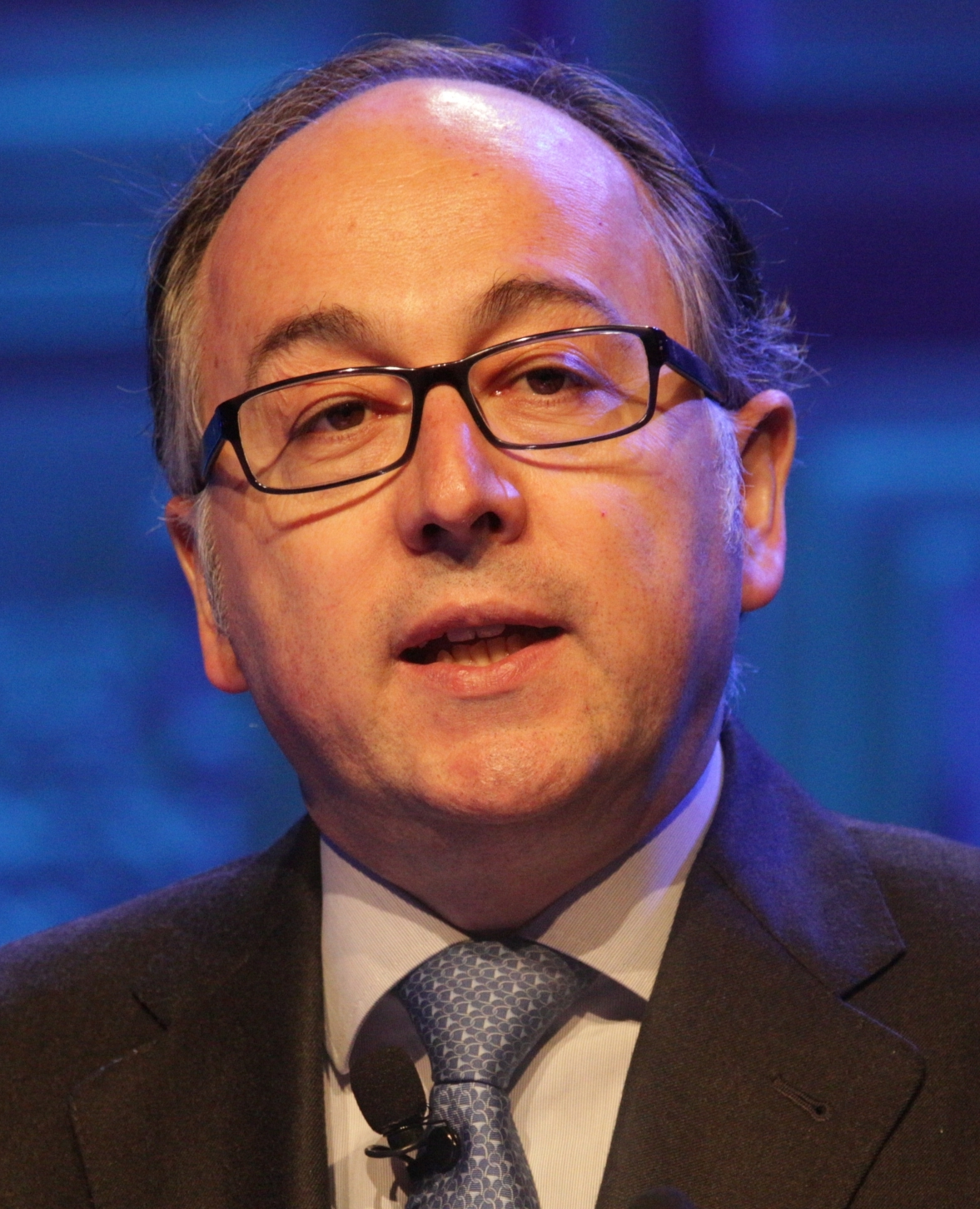
- Gallego in 2015
- Born: December 1968 (age 57); Madrid, Spain
- Education: Technical University of Madrid; IESE Business School
- Occupation: Businessman
- Employer: International Airlines Group
- Known for: CEO of Iberia (2013–2020)
- Title: CEO of International Airlines Group
- Term: 8 September 2020 –
- Predecessor: Willie Walsh

Luis Gallego Martín (born December 1968) is a Spanish engineer and businessman who succeeded Willie Walsh as the chief executive officer (CEO) of International Airlines Group in 2020. He is the former CEO of Iberia.

== Early life and education ==
Martín was born and brought up in Madrid; he originates from Getafe, an industrial area of the city.

He studied at Colegio La Inmaculada – PP. Escolapios (Piarists) of Getafe, holds a degree in aeronautical engineering from the Technical University of Madrid and an Executive Development Programme (PDD) qualification from the IESE Business School (University of Navarra).

== Career ==
He began his career in the Spanish Air Force, and has since worked in Aviaco, INDRA and, between 1997 and 2006, in several positions with the Iberia franchise partner Air Nostrum, where he became technical manager of workshop maintenance until his transfer to Clickair, prior to its merger with Vueling.

At Vueling, he held the post of production manager, with responsibility for flight operations, training, quality, safety, maintenance, and ground operations. With a total of 47 aircraft and more than 1,600 employees under his command, he and his team achieved the highest ratings for punctuality, regularity, and customer satisfaction of any Spanish airline.

He was CEO of Iberia Express from 2012 until he was appointed Iberia's CEO on 27 March 2013. From 1 January 2014 onwards he was also Iberia's chairman. He is also a member of International Airlines Group (IAG)'s management committee, a holding made up of Iberia, Vueling, Aer Lingus and British Airways.

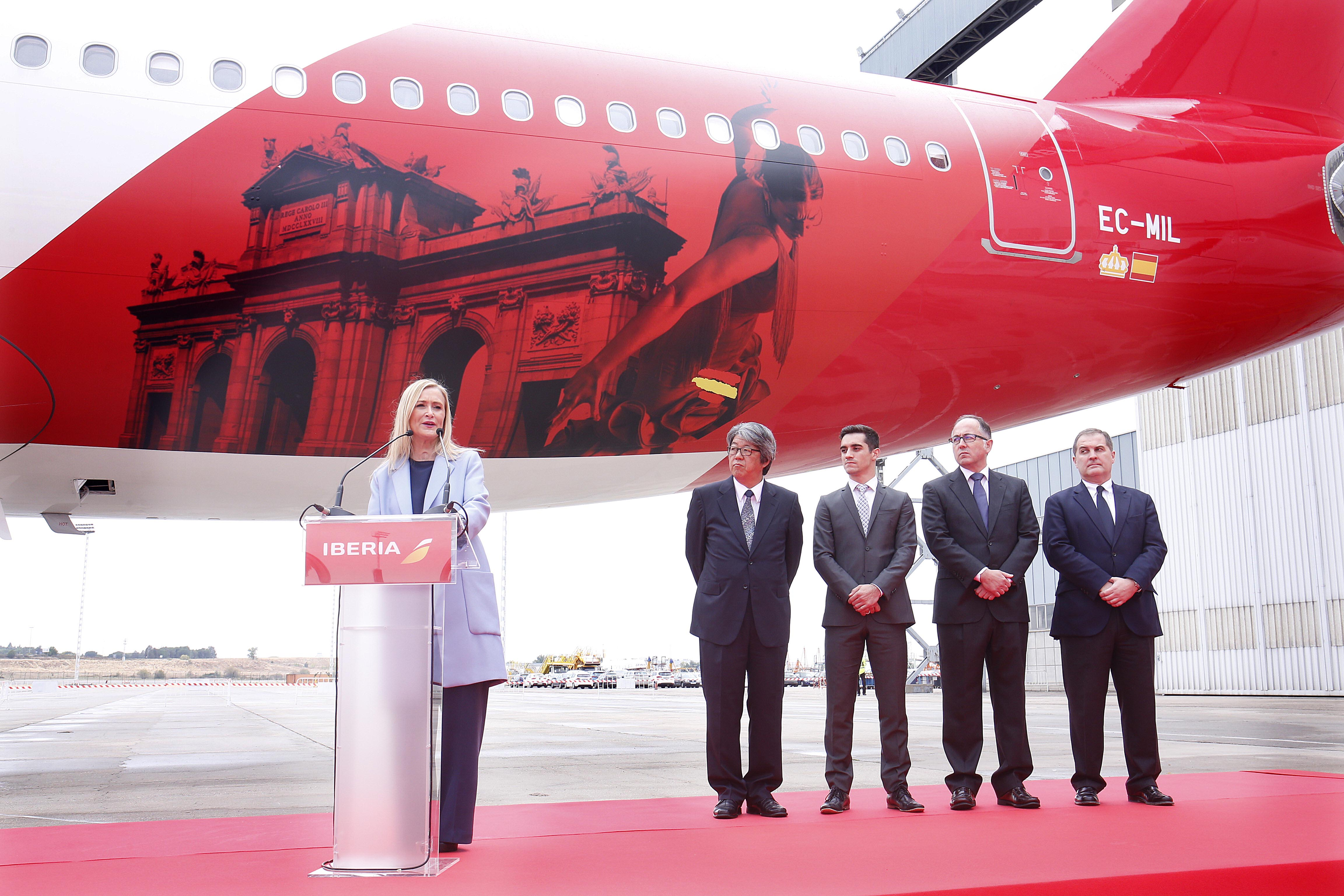
Luis Gallego (second from right) at the "rerun" of the Madrid-Tokyo flight

At Iberia, he was for having led the transformation and modernization process of the airline. In his first year as CEO, he cut the airline's losses by half, while in his second year in office, he was touted as being able to make Iberia profitable after six years of operating losses. He reached labour agreements with all Iberia's staff groups to reduce labour costs and increase employees' productivity. Since then, Iberia's quality and recommendation indexes of the airline's customers reached a record level and it became one of the world's most punctual airlines.

On 9 January 2020 he was set to replace Willie Walsh as CEO of IAG, but it was announced on 16 March that Walsh intended to delay his retirement to help the airline trade through the outbreak of COVID-19. The date of Walsh's departure was subsequently pushed back to 8 September 2020. The new Iberia CEO became the outgoing chairman and CEO of Vueling, Javier Sánchez-Prieto.

In one of his first major acts as CEO of IAG, Gallego replaced the CEO of British Airways Álex Cruz with the CEO of Aer Lingus Sean Doyle. Martín was described by BBC News as appearing "keen to make his mark and rebuild bridges with staff".

== Personal life ==
He supports Real Madrid CF and lives with his wife and two children in London in his capacity as IAG's CEO.

Business positions
Preceded by Rafael Sánchez-Lozano	CEO of Iberia; 2013–2020	Succeeded by Javier Sánchez-Prieto
Preceded by Willie Walsh	CEO of International Airlines Group; 2020–present	Incumbent
