= EU3 carriers =

The EU3 carriers commonly refer to three airline groups in the European Union:

- International Airlines Group, parent of British Airways and Iberia
- Air France-KLM, parent of Air France and KLM
- Lufthansa Group, parent of Lufthansa, Austrian Airlines and Swiss International Air Lines
