= Level Europe =

Austrian airline (2018–2020)

Level Europe GmbH

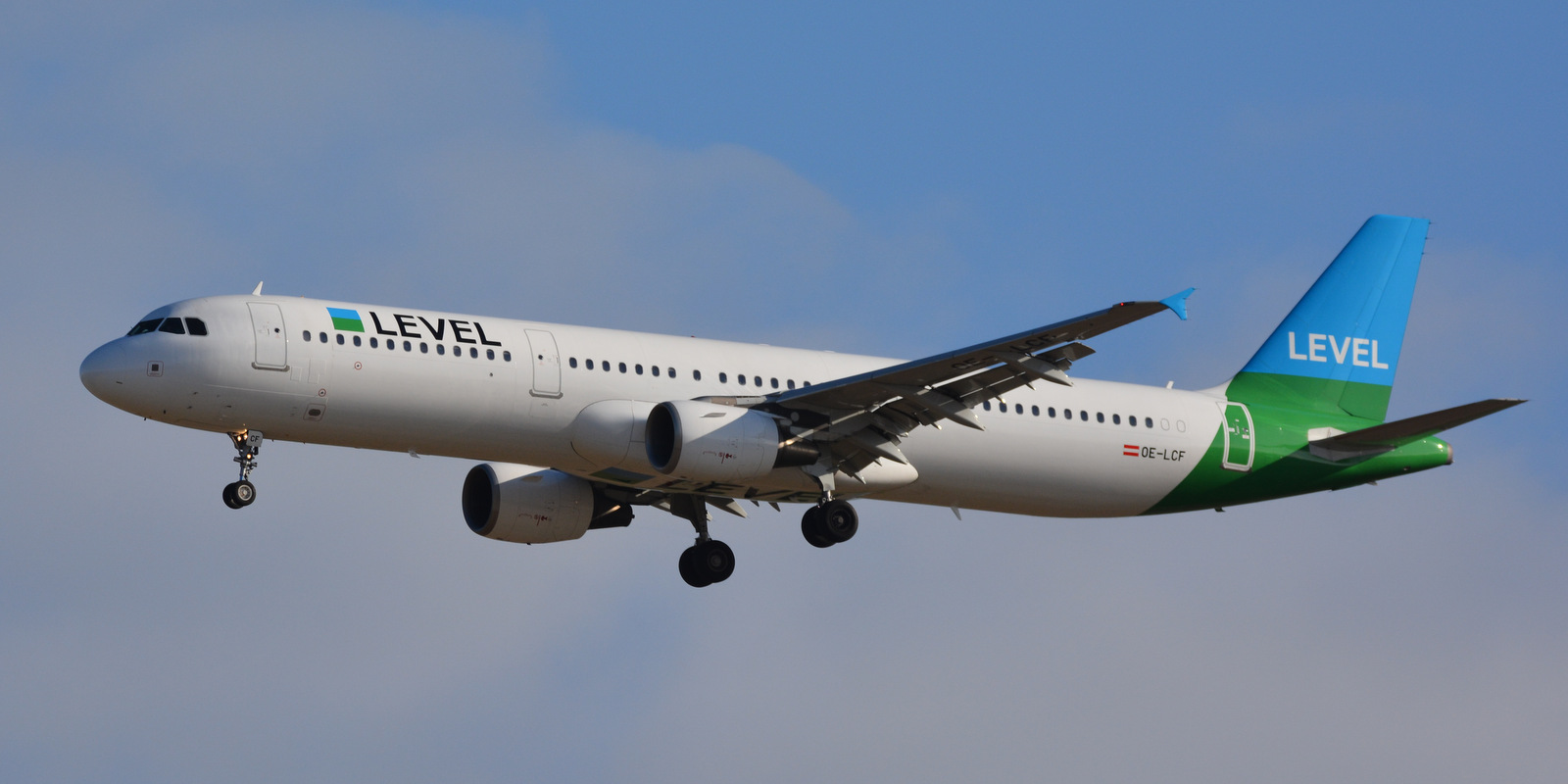
- Airbus A321
IATA	ICAO	Call sign
VK	FOO	AUSTROJET
- Founded: November 2017 (as Anisec Luftfahrt); 21 December 2019 (as Level Europe)
- Commenced operations: 17 July 2018
- Ceased operations: 18 June 2020
- Operating bases: Amsterdam; Vienna
- Fleet size: 6
- Destinations: 18
- Parent company: Vueling

Level Europe GmbH was an Austrian airline owned by Vueling from Spain, and by extension the International Airlines Group (IAG). It operated short-haul flights within Europe from bases at Amsterdam Schiphol Airport and Vienna International Airport sharing the Level brand. The airline's first flight took place on 17 July 2018. The airline filed for insolvency on 18 June 2020, and ceased operations on the same day.

== History ==
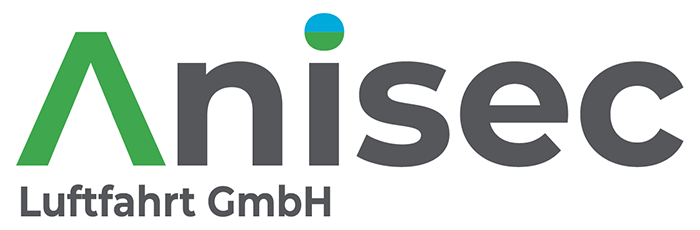
Anisec Luftfahrt GmbH logo

The airline was founded as Anisec Luftfahrt (Anisec Aviation in English) in November 2017 as a subsidiary of Spanish airline Vueling, originally with plans to operate flights from Vienna International Airport under "Vueling Austria" brand if IAG was successful in acquiring defunct airline Niki and its assets. On 28 June 2018, IAG announced that the subsidiary would operate four Airbus A321 aircraft previously used by Air Berlin under Level brand, as opposed to the "Vueling Austria" brand firstly planned, and would later open routes from Vienna to 14 destinations from 17 July 2018 through 13 August 2018.

On 14 March 2019, IAG announced plans to use the airline to open a new base at Amsterdam Schiphol Airport beginning from the following 6 April, with seven routes and three Airbus A320 aircraft to be transferred from Vueling parent company, between March and August 2019. In late December 2019, the airline's name was changed from Anisec Luftfahrt to Level Europe.

In March 2020, Level Europe's fleet was grounded and its operations were suspended due to the COVID-19 pandemic and its effects on air travel demand. Before operations were able to resume, on 18 June 2020 the airline announced that it would cease business operations with immediate effect and enter insolvency proceedings.

== Destinations ==
At the time of the airline's closure, it operated to 18 destinations on behalf of the Level brand.

== Fleet ==
At the time Level Europe ceased operations in June 2020, its fleet consisted of the following aircraft:

Level Europe fleet
Aircraft	In service	Orders	Passengers	Notes
Airbus A320-200	2	—	180	
Airbus A321-200	4	—	210	
Total	6	—		

== Frequent-flyer program ==
Short-haul flights operated by Level Europe did not earn Avios points on any frequent-flyer program affiliated with IAG's airlines.
