= Dermot Mannion =

Irish businessman

Dermot Mannion is the former deputy chairman of Royal Brunei Airlines and former chief executive officer of Aer Lingus.

Mannion was born in 1958 in Sligo, Ireland, one of eight children (four brothers and three sisters). He attended school at St. John's Boys School and Summerhill College, in Sligo. He went on to Trinity College, Dublin, where he graduated with a Bachelor of Business Studies in 1979. When he left college, he first worked with Ulster Investment Bank for a few years, before moving to the airline Emirates in 1987. In 2005, while President, Group Support Services with Emirates, he was appointed as new chief executive office of Aer Lingus.

He oversaw the privatisation of Aer Lingus in 2006 and saw it through two attempted takeover bids by main rival Ryanair. He resigned as chief executive officer of Aer Lingus in 2009.

He joined Royal Brunei Airlines in 2011 on a five-year contract as deputy chairman.

Business positions
Preceded by Willie Walsh	CEO of Aer Lingus; 2005–2009	Succeeded by Christoph Mueller
