= Christoph Mueller =

German airline CEO

- Born: 17 December 1961 (age 64); Wuppertal, Germany
- Education: University of Cologne
- Occupation: Businessman
- Spouse: Divorced

Christoph R. Mueller (born 17 December 1961) is a German businessman. From 2016 to 2019, he was chief digital and innovation officer of Emirates Group. He is the former chief executive officer of Malaysia Airlines. With over 25 years' experience as a turnaround specialist in the aviation, logistic and tourism industry, Mueller has been widely credited with leading the financial recovery of Aer Lingus.

== Career ==
Mueller holds an MBA from the University of Cologne and completed an Advanced Management Program at Harvard Business School. In 1989, Mueller joined German airline Lufthansa as a financial analyst in the internal audit department. From 1991 to 1994 he was a financial controller with Daimler-Benz Aerospace where he implemented restructuring programmes in the subsidiaries Elbe Flugzeugwerke, Dresden, Dornier and Fokker in Amsterdam. He re-joined Lufthansa as Senior Vice President of Finance in 1994 and became Executive Vice President in Corporate Planning and Network Management.

In 1999, he joined Belgian airline Sabena as CEO. Following the 11 September attacks and the subsequent downturn in the airline industry, the company filed for bankruptcy in 2001. Mueller raised funds and founded Brussels Airlines, which started operations a day after the grounding of Sabena, where he remained chairman until 2002. He later served as the chief financial officer of DHL Worldwide where he was responsible for the successful turnaround programme which led to an improved bottom line of US$300 million within a year. In his expansive career in the aviation and logistic industry, Mueller was also the executive aviation director at Tui Travel, a FTSE 100 company, where he restructured the entire lease portfolio and order book of seven airlines with a total fleet of 170 aircraft.

In 2009, Mueller was appointed CEO of Irish airline Aer Lingus where he repositioned the loss making company as a service airline to compete with low budget alternatives, such as Ryanair. Mueller successfully expanded the airline's transatlantic services, repositioning it as a more service oriented carrier. During his time in Ireland, he was also a member of the board of Tourism Ireland and chairman of An Post. In 2015, he left Ireland to take up the CEO position at Malaysia Airlines; a company struggling after two air incidents, the disappearance of Malaysia Airlines Flight 370 and the attack on Malaysia Airlines Flight 17, as well as competition from low budget airline Air Asia. Mueller joined the airline after it was privatized and subsequently announced 6000 job cuts, roughly a third of the workforce. Less than a year later however, Mueller resigned from the company, citing changing personal circumstances.

In September 2016, Mueller joined Emirates Group as chief digital and innovation officer and resigned on 7 February 2019.

Mueller was previously President of IACA, the International Air Carrier Association, in Brussels, and chairman of the Advisory Board of Eurocontrol. He has served as a Non Executive Director in multiple companies amongst others, LOT, Luxair, Lauda Air, Tuifly and Hapag-Lloyd Shipping.

Business positions
Preceded by Dermot Mannion	CEO of Aer Lingus; 2009–2015	Succeeded by Stephen Kavanagh
