= BA Euroflyer =

Subsidiary airline of British Airways

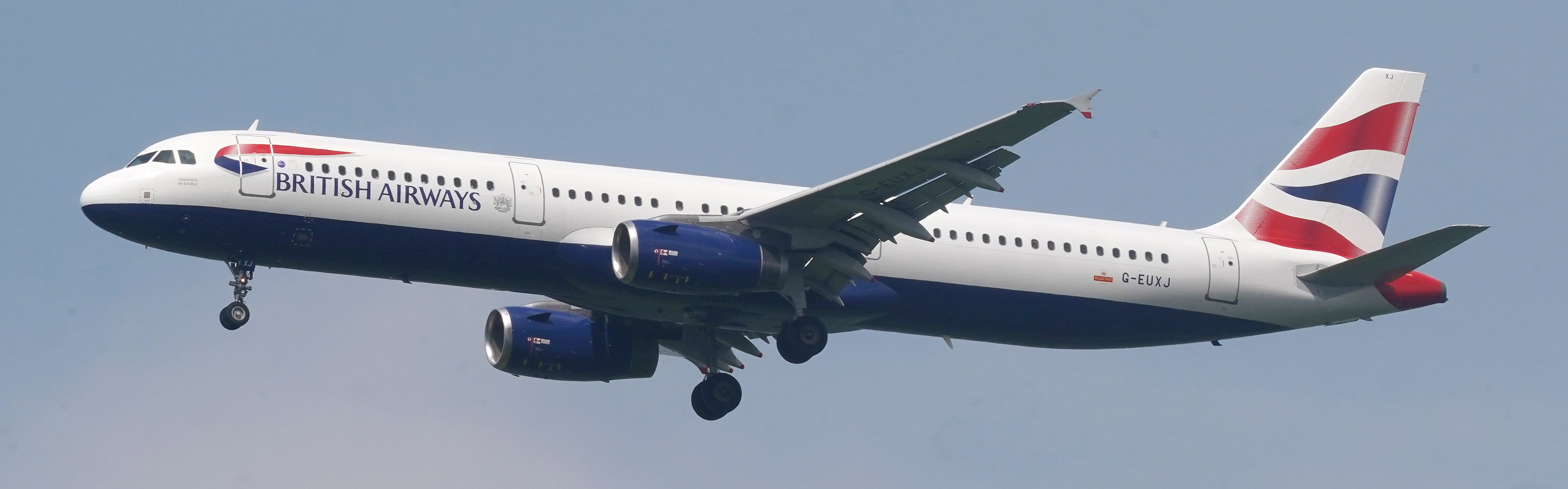
- BA Euroflyer Airbus A321
IATA	ICAO	Call sign
A0	EFW	GRIFFIN
- Founded: 2021; 5 years ago
- Commenced operations: March 2022; 4 years ago
- AOC #: BA Euroflyer Limited (GB 2488)
- Operating bases: Gatwick Airport
- Frequent-flyer program: The British Airways Club (Avios)
- Alliance: Oneworld (affiliate)
- Fleet size: 28
- Destinations: 48
- Parent company: British Airways
- Headquarters: London, England
- Website: www.britishairways.com

British Airways Euroflyer (BA Euroflyer) is a British airline. A subsidiary of British Airways, it operates a network of short haul services from its base at Gatwick Airport near London, England. All services operate with BA's full colours, titles and flight numbers.

== History ==
By early 2020, British Airways operated flights to over 50 destinations from its secondary hub at Gatwick Airport. As a result of the COVID-19 pandemic, British Airways suspended operations at Gatwick and consolidated all of its operations at Heathrow Airport. In 2021, in an attempt to reduce operating costs to better compete with low-cost carriers such as easyJet, British Airways announced its intention to establish a short-haul standalone business at Gatwick from 2022, similar to its BA CityFlyer operation from London City Airport, which operates under the British Airways name but exists as a separate entity.

BA Euroflyer commenced operations in March 2022, with flights being operated by mainline BA until the airline received its Air Operators Certificate in December 2022.

== Destinations ==
BA Euroflyer operates over 40 destinations from its base at London Gatwick Airport on behalf of its parent company British Airways.

Country	City	Airport	Notes	Refs
Algeria	Algiers	Houari Boumediene Airport		
Austria	Graz	Graz Airport		
Austria	Innsbruck	Innsbruck Airport	Seasonal	
Austria	Salzburg	Salzburg Airport		
Croatia	Dubrovnik	Dubrovnik Airport	Seasonal	
Cyprus	Larnaca	Larnaca International Airport		
Cyprus	Paphos	Paphos International Airport		
Egypt	Sharm El Sheikh	Sharm El Sheikh International Airport	Seasonal	
Finland	Lapland	Ivalo Airport	Seasonal	
Finland	Rovaniemi	Rovaniemi Airport	Begins 4 December 2026	
France	Bordeaux	Bordeaux–Mérignac Airport		
France	Grenoble	Alpes–Isère Airport	Seasonal	
France	Lyon	Lyon–Saint-Exupéry Airport	Seasonal	
France	Montpellier	Montpellier–Méditerranée Airport		
France	Nice	Nice Côte d'Azur Airport	Seasonal	
Greece	Heraklion	Heraklion International Airport	Seasonal	
Greece	Kos	Kos International Airport	Seasonal	
Greece	Rhodes	Rhodes International Airport	Seasonal	
Greece	Santorini	Santorini International Airport	Seasonal	
Greece	Thessaloniki	Thessaloniki Airport	Seasonal	
Italy	Bari	Bari Karol Wojtyła Airport	Seasonal	
Italy	Cagliari	Cagliari Elmas Airport	Seasonal	
Italy	Catania	Catania–Fontanarossa Airport	Seasonal	
Italy	Turin	Turin Airport		
Italy	Verona	Verona Villafranca Airport		
Malta	Malta	Malta International Airport		
Morocco	Agadir	Agadir–Al Massira Airport		
Morocco	Marrakesh	Marrakesh Menara Airport		
Morocco	Rabat	Rabat–Salé Airport		
Portugal	Faro	Faro Airport		
Portugal	Funchal	Madeira Airport		
Portugal	Porto	Porto Airport		
Spain	Alicante	Alicante–Elche Miguel Hernández Airport		
Spain	Fuerteventura	Fuerteventura Airport	Seasonal	
Spain	Gran Canaria	Gran Canaria Airport		
Spain	Ibiza	Ibiza Airport	Seasonal	
Spain	Lanzarote	Lanzarote Airport		
Spain	Málaga	Málaga Airport		
Spain	Menorca	Menorca Airport	Seasonal	
Spain	Palma de Mallorca	Palma de Mallorca Airport		
Spain	Seville	Seville Airport		
Spain	Tenerife	Tenerife South Airport		
Switzerland	Geneva	Geneva Airport	Seasonal	
Turkey	Antalya	Antalya Airport	Seasonal	
Turkey	Dalaman	Dalaman Airport	Seasonal	
United Kingdom	London	Gatwick Airport	Base	
United Kingdom	Jersey‡	Jersey Airport	Seasonal	

‡ Jersey is a British Crown dependency, and is not part of the UK.

== Fleet ==
As of August 2025, BA Euroflyer operates an all-Airbus fleet composed of the following aircraft:

BA Euroflyer fleet
Aircraft	In service	Orders	Passengers			Notes
Aircraft	In service	Orders	J	Y	Total	Notes
Airbus A320-200	17	—	50	102	152	Transferred from British Airways.
Airbus A320-200	17	—	48	108	156	Transferred from British Airways.
Airbus A321-200	11	—	54	136	190	Transferred from British Airways.
Total	28	—				
