= Clickair =

Spanish low-cost airline

IATA	ICAO	Call sign
XG	CLI	CLICKJET
- Founded: 2006; 20 years ago (as Catair)
- Commenced operations: 1 October 2006; 20 years ago
- Ceased operations: 15 July 2009; 17 years ago (merged with Vueling)
- Operating bases: Barcelona–El Prat Airport; Málaga Airport; Seville Airport; Valencia Airport
- Fleet size: 26
- Destinations: 41
- Parent company: Iberia
- Headquarters: El Prat de Llobregat, Catalonia, Spain
- Key people: Álex Cruz (CEO); Carlos Losada (President)
- Website: clickair.com

Clickair was a low-cost airline that was based in the Parc de Negocis Mas Blau in El Prat de Llobregat, near Barcelona, Spain. Clickair flew to nearly 40 destinations in Europe. The airline's main base was Barcelona–El Prat Airport with further bases at Málaga, Seville and Valencia. Clickair merged into Vueling on 15 July 2009. The company slogan was Catalan: Vola intel·ligent (Fly smart).

== History ==
=== Early years ===
The company was first called Catair, derived from CAT (CATalonia) and AIR, but changed its name to Clickair just before starting operations. Clickair positioned itself as a low-cost airline and offered a buy on board programme for food, drinks, and other goods.

The airline started operations on 1 October 2006 with three Airbus A320 aircraft operating five routes from its Barcelona hub. The company was founded from initial capital investment from Cobra, Iberia, Iberostar, Nefinsa and Quercus Equity (Group Agrolimen), each with a 20% share, with Iberia setting up the airline. Although Iberia held a 20% stake in the airline, it controlled 80% of its economic rights. The company has plans for the operation of 30 Airbus A320s on 70 routes, carrying 10 million passengers a year by the end of 2008. Clickair's IATA code, XG was inherited from Gestair Cargo's retired passenger airline Regional Líneas Aéreas.

=== Merger with Vueling ===
In June 2008, Clickair and rival Spanish low-cost airline Vueling announced their intention to merge. The merger was agreed because they wanted to make a single carrier better equipped to take out high fuel costs and fees, and both airlines were losing a lot of money. The merger would cause Clickair to cease operations because Vueling was to be the name of the new airline. The airline was to be based in Barcelona where both of the low-cost airlines were based and were to keep its original hubs. Boss of Clickair Alex Cruz was also to be the chief executive of the airline.

Five aircraft were planned to be introduced in 2008; however, the airline scaled back its expansion plans and would add only one aircraft to the fleet during the year.

On 15 July 2009, the merger of Vueling and Clickair was completed. The newly merged airline operates under the Vueling brand, with Clickair ceasing its operations. Since the merger, Vueling has become the second-largest Spanish carrier, flying 8.2 million passengers in 2009 to almost 50 destinations. After ceasing operations, 20 of the 26 aircraft went to Vueling. The rest of the fleet went to Astraeus Airlines, Vertir Airlines and Ural Airlines, with two being stored.

== Fleet ==
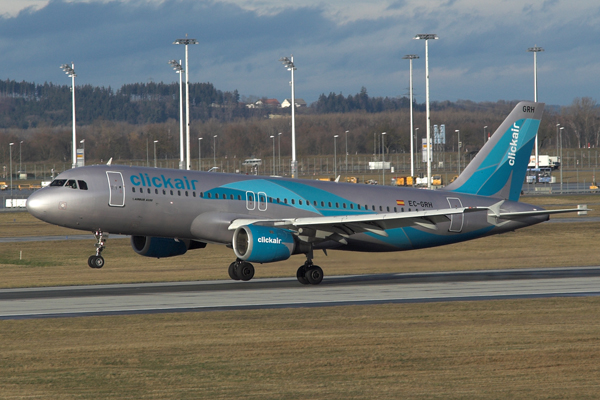
Clickair Airbus A320

The Clickair fleet consisted of the following aircraft on 21 March 2009, with eight aircraft having been purchased new and fourteen second-hand A320 aircraft originally built for Iberia:

Clickair fleet
Aircraft	Total	Passengers
Airbus A320-200	26	180
