= Antonio Vázquez Romero =

Spanish airline executive (born 1951)

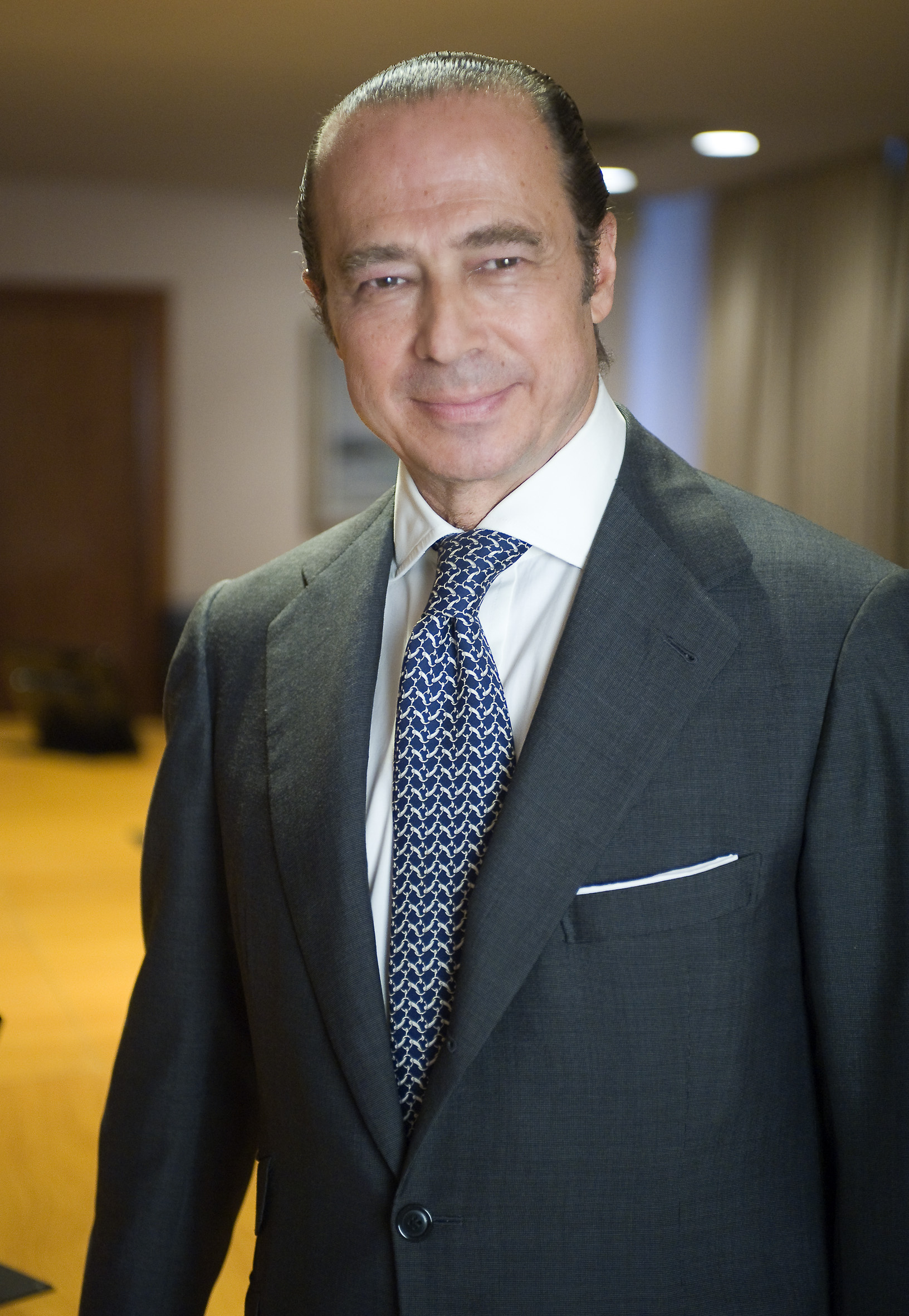
- Born: 23 November 1951 (age 74); Córdoba, Spain
- Education: University of Málaga
- Occupation: Businessman
- Employer: International Airlines Group
- Known for: International Airlines Group
- Title: Chairman
- Term: Since 2010
- Children: 4

Antonio Vázquez Romero (born 23 November 1951, in Córdoba, Spain) is a Spanish airline executive. He is the Chairman of International Airlines Group since May 2010.

Between 2009 and 2013 he was the Chairman and CEO of Iberia.

== Early life ==
Romero was born in Córdoba, Spain, on November 23, 1951, and holds a degree in economics from the University of Málaga.

== Career ==
From 1978 until he joined Tabacalera in 1993, Vázquez worked in consumer product companies, such as the Osborne group and the Domecq group. In the 1974-1978 period he worked for Arthur Andersen & Co (today Accenture).

Romero worked in the Tabacalera group, later Altadis. He joined Tabacalera in April, 1993, as manager of international business development. In December, 1996, he was named managing director of the cigar division, remaining in the position until May 14, 2005. He is credited with playing a decisive role in the achievement of world leadership by Altadis in this sector.

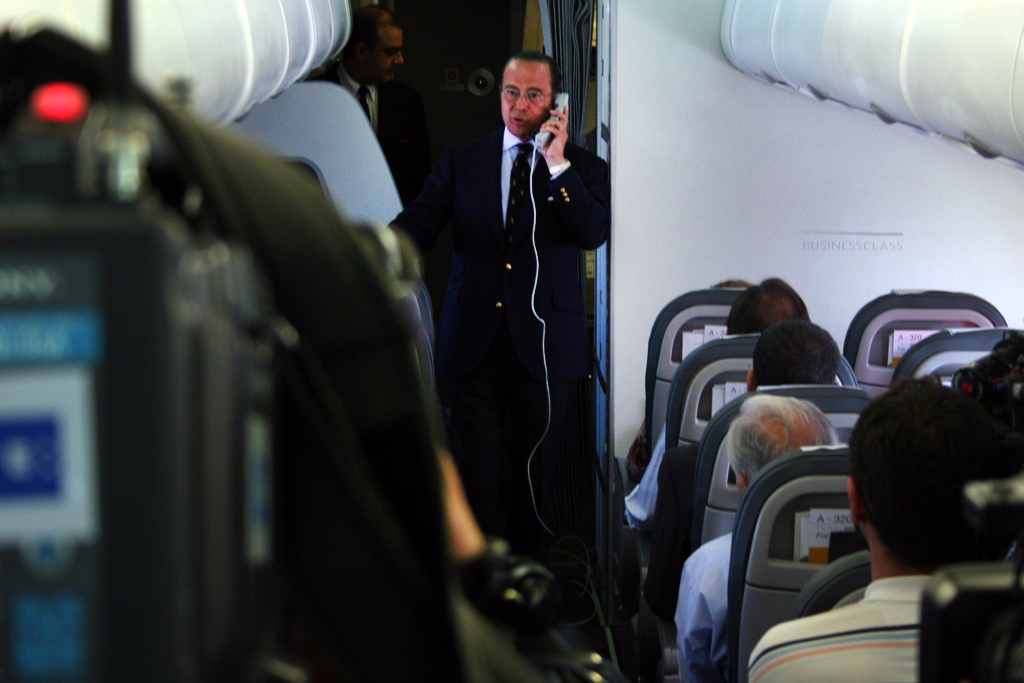
Antonio Vázquez on board an Iberia aircraft.

Romero joined Iberia in 2005 as a member of the board in representation of Logista, then a major stockholder, a position he held until 2007. With the proposed merger of Iberia and British Airways, Romero is also slated to become Chairman of International Airlines Group, the holding company that will control the merged entities. In May, 2005, he was named chairman of the Altadis board and co-president of the company. In June of the same year, he was appointed as chairman of the executive committee and CEO of the Altadis group.

In January, 2008, he resigned all his posts in the Altadis group, and left the company in August. In June of that year, he was named CEO of Telefónica Internacional. In 1998 he was appointed as a member of the board of Aldeasa, a position he held for ten years.

== Personal life ==
Romero is the father of four children.
