= Vueling =

Spanish low-cost airline

Vueling S.A.

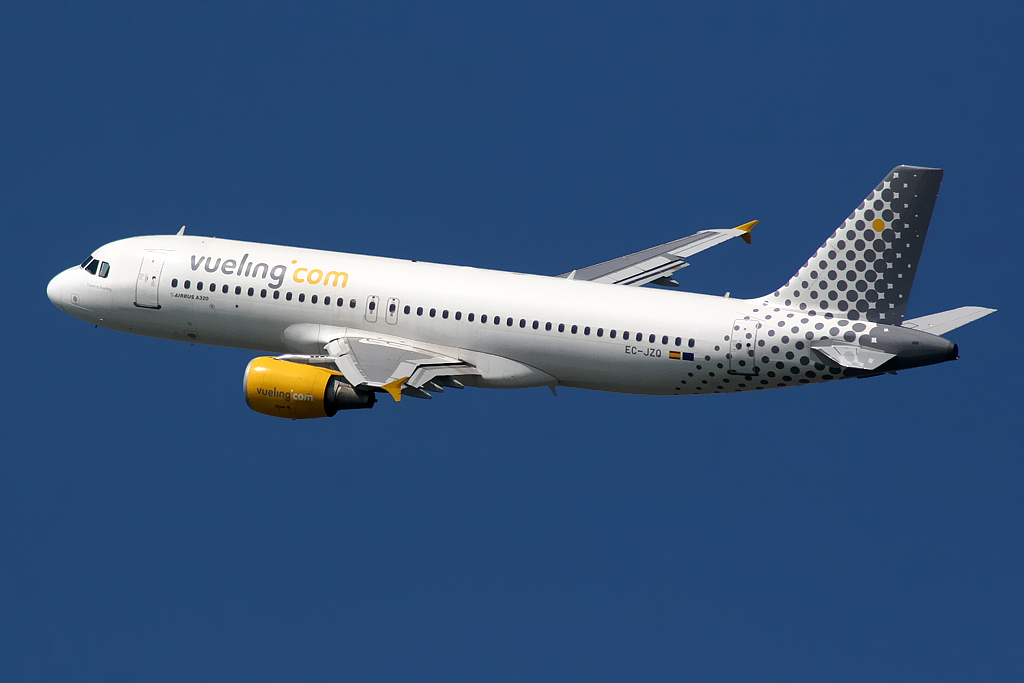
IATA	ICAO	Call sign
VY	VLG	VUELING
- Founded: 10 February 2004; 22 years ago
- Commenced operations: 1 July 2004; 22 years ago
- Operating bases: List of bases: Alicante; Amsterdam; Barcelona (main); Bilbao; Florence; Gran Canaria; Ibiza; London–Gatwick; Málaga; Palma de Mallorca; Paris–Orly; Rome–Fiumicino (secondary); Santiago de Compostela; Seville; Tenerife–North; Valencia
- Frequent-flyer program: Vueling Club (Avios affiliate)
- Fleet size: 136
- Destinations: 99
- Parent company: IAG (97.52%)
- Headquarters: Viladecans, Barcelona, Catalonia, Spain
- Key people: Carolina Martinoli (chairman & CEO)
- Revenue: ▲€1,016 million (2021)
- Operating income: ▲€181.1 million (2017)
- Net income: ▲€117.2 million (2017)
- Total assets: ▲€1,509.9 million (2017)
- Total equity: ▼€237.2 million (2012)
- Employees: 3,189
- Website: www.vueling.com

Vueling S.A. (/ˈvwɛlɪŋ/ VWEL-ing, Spanish: [ˈbweliŋ]) is a Spanish low-cost airline based in Viladecans in Greater Barcelona with operating bases in Barcelona–El Prat Airport in Spain (main), Paris Orly Airport in France, Amsterdam Schiphol Airport in the Netherlands, London Gatwick Airport in the UK, and Rome Fiumicino Airport in Italy (secondary). As of 2021, Vueling serves 122 destinations in Africa, Asia, and Europe, and carried more than 34 million passengers in 2019. Since 2013, it has been an operating company of International Airlines Group, the parent company of British Airways, Iberia, and Aer Lingus. The airline was established in 2004, and its name was formed by combining the Spanish word vuelo (flight) with the English gerund suffix -ing.

== History ==
=== Early years ===
Vueling was established on 10 February 2004 and commenced operations on 1 July 2004 with a flight between Barcelona and Ibiza. The initial fleet consisted of two Airbus A320 aircraft, based in Barcelona serving Brussels, Ibiza, Palma de Mallorca and Paris-CDG. The name Vueling was formed by combining the Spanish word vuelo (flight) with the English gerund suffix -ing.

=== Financial concerns and management re-shuffle ===
In 2007, Apax Partners sold its then-21% stake in the carrier in June of that year, followed by two profit warnings issued in August and October. Two company directors and the chairman resigned shortly before the second profit warning, citing differences over commercial strategy. Shares in the company were also temporarily suspended. This led to Barbara Cassani, former chief executive of UK low-cost airline Go, joining Vueling as chairman of the board in September 2007. The airline then embarked on a restructuring exercise and posted its first profit in mid 2009.

=== Vueling and Clickair merger ===
In June 2008, Vueling and rival Spanish low-cost airline Clickair announced their intention to merge. The merger was designed to create a carrier better able to compete in the competitive Spanish airline market and mitigate high fuel costs with Iberia as the main industrial partner. While the new company would trade under the Vueling name, Clickair's Alex Cruz was named as chief executive. The deal was subject to scrutiny and approval by European competition regulators, who were concerned that the merged airline would have a significant competitive advantage on around 19 routes. The regulators demanded the release of slots at Barcelona and other European airports as a condition of the merger. On 15 July 2009, the merger of Vueling and Clickair was completed. The new merged airline operates under the Vueling brand, with Clickair flights and aircraft re-branded under the Vueling name. It became the second largest Spanish carrier, flying 8.2 million passengers in 2009 to almost 50 destinations.

=== Co-operation with MTV ===
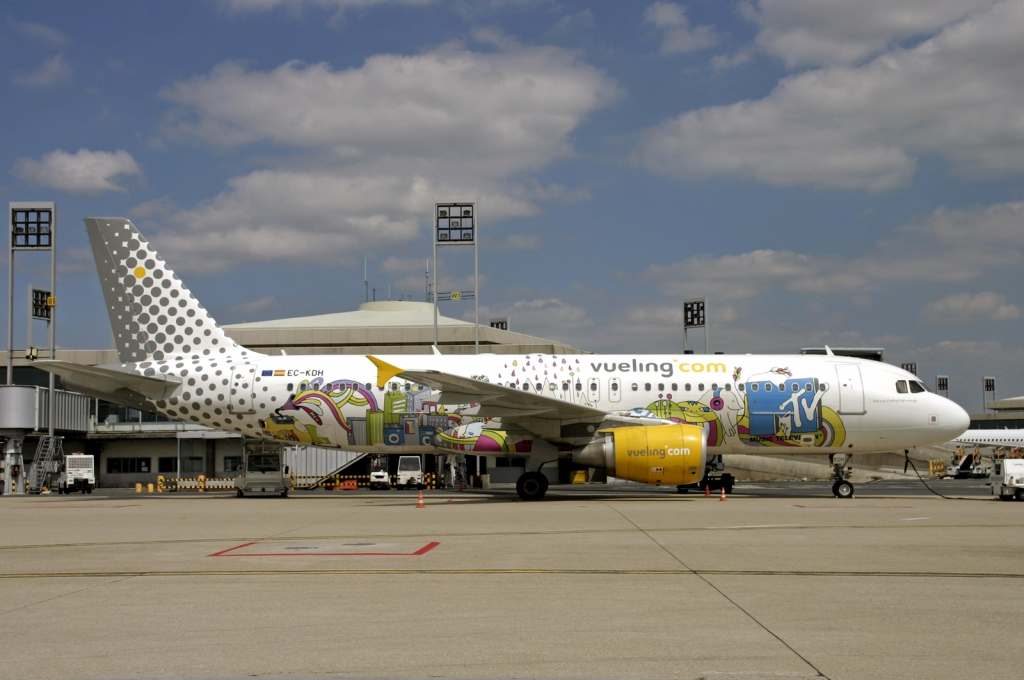
Vueling Airbus A320-214 in MTV Livery at Paris-CDG, France (2008)

In 2009, Vueling, for the second year running, cooperated with MTV during the summer season. Two of Vueling's A320 aircraft (EC-KDG and EC-KDH) were re-painted into MTV liveries with some MTV styling on-board too. The designs of both liveries were created by Custo Dalmau and both liveries were removed at the end of 2009. In the summer season of 2010, EC-KDG had again been re-painted into an MTV livery, and in 2011, it was re-painted into a livery based on French DJ and producer David Guetta; the livery has since been removed and co-operation with MTV has since ended.

=== 2010 onwards ===
In November 2010, Vueling announced a new base at Toulouse–Blagnac Airport in France from April 2011, followed in December 2010 by the announcement of a new base in Amsterdam, also to open during April 2011. The Toulouse base opened on 23 April 2011, but has since closed.

In January 2011, further expansion was announced with Vueling adding a further nine aircraft to its fleet, including Airbus A319 aircraft. Six Airbus A320s were delivered between April and June 2011, whilst the remaining two A320s were delivered by the end of 2011.

On 21 March 2012, it was announced by CEO Alex Cruz that Rome would be added as a new base. The base launched on 25 March 2012 with one aircraft based there: the airline has since expanded at Rome with numerous new destinations. On 5 December 2012, Vueling announced the opening of a new base of operations in Florence: the carrier is to base one aircraft there and serve four new European destinations. Ten months later, on 25 October 2013, Vueling launched Florence-Catania, its first domestic route in Italy.

Since November 2013, the airline has continued to expand from its hub at Barcelona. On 6 November 2013, Vueling announced a new base with one aircraft in Brussels, with seven new destinations from May 2014, in addition to the four previous routes from Brussels. Also in November 2013, Vueling announced an expansion of its base at Rome Fiumicino Airport. From mid-2014, eight aircraft would be based there, operating more than 30 routes. This expansion meant Rome-Fiumicino would become Vueling's secondary hub, after Barcelona. In 2014, Vueling opened routes to Warsaw and Cracow in Poland, both of which were canceled in 2020.

During the first weekend of July 2016, Vueling had many delays and cancellations, which resulted in an investigation by the Spanish authorities. During the same month, Vueling cancelled all its flights to Sheremetyevo International Airport, Vilnius Airport and Rabat–Salé Airport. Clients were able to get a refund or fly to the nearest airport where Vueling flew. In October 2016, Vueling shut down their bases in Brussels, Catania and Palermo as part of restructuring measures.

In March 2017, Vueling canceled its route from Barcelona to Frankfurt Airport.

On 29 December 2017, it was announced that IAG would acquire Austrian airline Niki as a subsidiary for Vueling. However, Niki was later acquired by Niki Lauda, the owner of Laudamotion, with investment from Ryanair. A few months after losing the bid for Niki, IAG instead established Anisec Luftfahrt as a subsidiary of Vueling, operating as LEVEL, using four former Niki aircraft that had not been purchased by rival Lufthansa (and leased to Lauda).

In 2020, Vueling announced new routes linking Paris, France to Dubrovnik, Croatia and Seville, Spain to Marrakech, Morocco. Subsequently in December 2024, Vueling announced that the airline will launch flights between Florence and Brussels in April 2025 using their Airbus A319 aircraft.

On 23 July 2025, a group of 52 Jewish teenagers and their chaperone were removed from Vueling Airlines flight 8166 (Valencia-Paris Orly) before departure. The incident gave rise to a number of complaints that accused the airline of engaging in antisemitic behaviour. Officials from the French government requested an explanation from the airline, and several Jewish advocacy groups expressed their concerns. The United States Department of State called for a complete investigation of the events. In an unsubstantiated statement, Amichai Chikli, Israel's minister for Diaspora Affairs and Combating Antisemitism, claimed the Vueling crew had said "Israel is a terrorist state", and attributed the incident to "Hamas's campaign of lies". However, Vueling has consistently denied all allegations of antisemitism, arguing that it was the persistent and highly disruptive behavior of the group that ultimately led to their removal, as their actions constituted a serious threat to the aircraft's safety equipment. After several warnings from the crew were disregarded, the pilot ordered the group's forced disembarkation to guarantee the flight's safety. Spain's Civil Guard, who assisted with the disembarkation, said that the passengers who were removed were French nationals, and that it was not aware of the group's religious affiliation. Following a comprehensive investigation of the incident, the Spanish Aviation Safety and Security Agency later concluded that the airline had acted reasonably and in accordance with the official regulations, without any evidence of antisemitic motivations.

== Corporate affairs ==
=== Business trends ===
The key trends for Vueling are shown below (as at year ending 31 December):

	Turnover (€m)	Net profit (€m)	Number of employees (Note: at year end)	Number of passengers (m)	Passenger load factor (%)	Number of aircraft (Note: on average)	Notes/ sources
2008	437	8.5	1,013	5.9	70.3	21	
2009	598	27.8	1,195	8.2	73.7	26	
2010	790	46.0	1,266	11.0	73.2	36	
2011	856	10.4	1,389	12.3	75.6	44	
2012	1,103	28.3	1,774	14.8	77.7	53	
2013	1,404	93.4	1,937	17.2	79.6	64	
2014	1,697	98.3	2,390	21.5	79.6	80	
2015	1,933	95.3	2,637	24.8	81.3	96	
2016	2,027	48.9	3,030	27.8	82.4	106	
2017	2,085	117	3,089	29.6	83.7	108	
2018	2,338	149	3,553	32.7	84.3	113	
2019	2,446	132	4,439	34.5	85.7	122	
2020	594	−785	3,995	9.6	69.8	127	
2021	1,014	−350	3,969	15.8	76.6	127	
2022	2,600	130	4,570	31.9	87.0	124	
2023	3,189	315	4,605	37	91	124	
2024	3,249	213	4,706	38	92	131	
2025	3,230	234	4,958	38	90	142	

=== Takeover by IAG ===
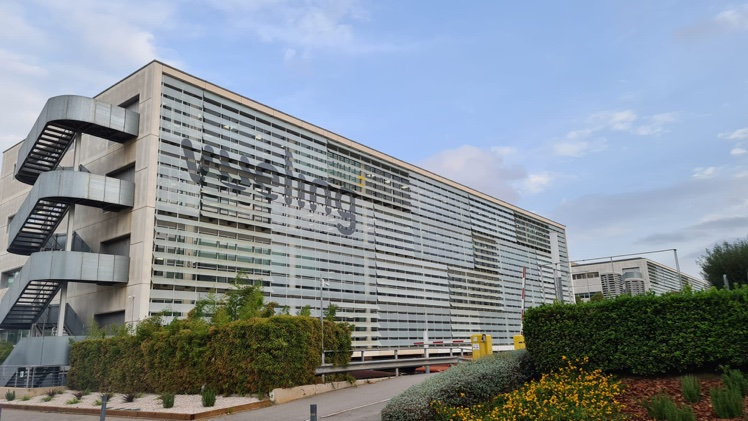
Vueling head office in Viladecans

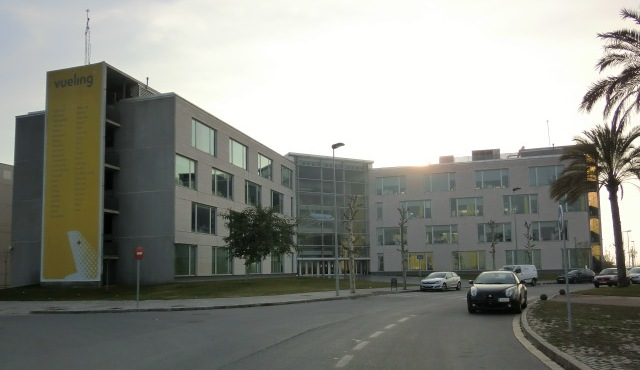
Vueling's former head office in El Prat de Llobregat, Spain

In November 2012, International Airlines Group, whose subsidiary Iberia held a 45.85% stake in Vueling, offered to buy the remaining 54.15% of the company with both Iberia and IAG owning both shares and not resulting in the company being wholly owned by IAG through 100% of shares. IAG, also the owner of British Airways, plans to use Vueling to help stem losses at Iberia. However, market trends (increased profits and improved figures from Vueling resulting in a higher share-price) had made IAG's offer a significant undervaluation of the airline. Vueling had urged its shareholders to reject IAG's offer and its shareholders had until the 8th of April 2013 to decide upon the recommendation.

On 27 March 2013, IAG improved its offer for Vueling, raising its offer per share from €7 to €9.25. Vueling shares quickly surged following the announcement, rising by 8.8% to €9.23 following a temporary suspension as BMAD waited on an official comment from Vueling regarding the updated offer. The acceptance period was also increased by 48 calendar days.

On 9 April 2013, the board of Vueling unanimously recommended shareholders accept an improved offer of €9.25 per share from IAG. IAG CEO Willie Walsh confirmed that the board had recommended the new offer; however, Walsh also stated that Vueling would not be merged with Iberia, saying, "Vueling will operate as a stand-alone entity in the IAG Group."

On 23 April 2013, IAG acquired control of Vueling, which saw the recently purchased 44.66% stake by IAG merged with Iberia's existing 45.85% stake to form a 90.51% shareholding. Vueling remains a standalone company now within the IAG, and its management structure is unchanged; however, Vueling's CEO reports directly to IAG CEO.

=== Frequent flyer programme ===
Vueling's frequent flyer programme is Vueling Club, which allows members to earn and redeem Avios for award flights or fare discounts on Vueling and IAG airlines Aer Lingus, British Airways, Iberia, and Level, and for award travel on Oneworld airline alliance partners. Vueling Club replaced Vueling's original programme, Punto (Spanish for point), on 27 October 2017, after being announced prior in August 2017. Punto allowed account holders to earn and redeem points for Vueling flights.

== Destinations ==
Countries in which Vueling operates as of March 2026

=== Codeshare agreements ===
Vueling has codeshare agreements with the following airlines:

- Aer Lingus
- British Airways
- Iberia
- Level
- LATAM Brasil
- Qatar Airways
- TUI Airways

== Fleet ==
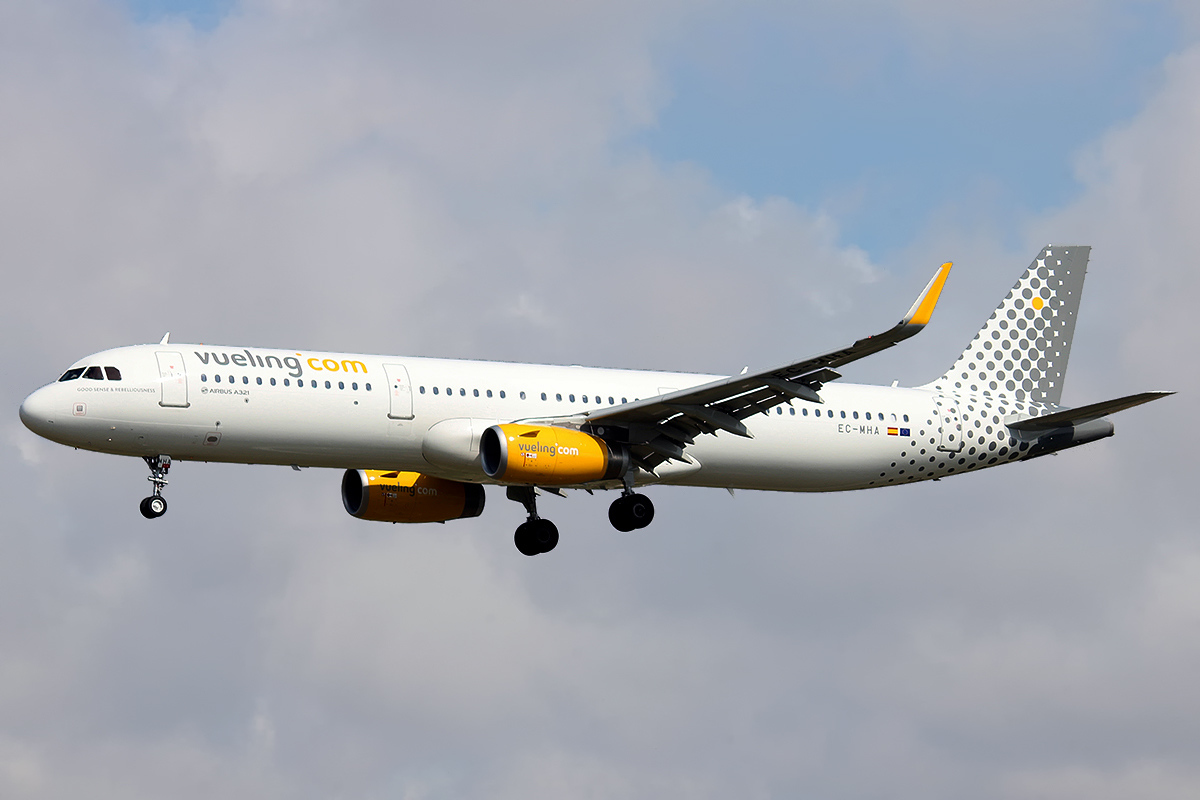
Vueling Airbus A321-200

As of August 2025, Vueling operates an all-Airbus A320 family fleet composed of the following aircraft:

Vueling fleet
Aircraft	In service	Orders	Passengers	Notes
Airbus A319-100	6	—	144	
Airbus A320-200	92	—	180	
Airbus A320-200	92	—	186	
Airbus A320neo	22	—	186	
Airbus A321-200	18	—	220	
Airbus A321neo	4	—	236	
Boeing 737 MAX 200	—	25	200	Deliveries from 2026. Order with 100 options.
Boeing 737 MAX 10	—	25	230	Deliveries from 2026. Order with 100 options.
Total	142	50		

In July 2025, it was confirmed the order for 50 Boeing 737 MAX aircraft ordered by parent company IAG in 2022 is intended for Vueling to make a fleet expansion to become a mixed Airbus A320neo family and Boeing 737 MAX narrow-body fleet. The order also includes 100 options for the Boeing 737 MAX.
