= Vertir Airlines =

Armenian cargo airline

IATA	ICAO	Call sign
–	VRZ	VERTIR
- Founded: 2007
- Commenced operations: 2010
- Ceased operations: 2016
- Operating bases: Zvartnots International Airport
- Fleet size: 1
- Headquarters: Yerevan, Armenia

Vertir Airlines was an airline based in Yerevan, Armenia, that operated cargo services out of Zvartnots International Airport. The company was established in 2007, and revenue flights were launched on 29 August 2010. The company halted operations in 2016.

== Fleet ==
The Vertir Airlines fleet consisted of the following aircraft (as of August 2016):

- 1 Airbus A300-600R

Over the years, the following aircraft types were operated, all of them on lease:

Vertir Airlines fleet
Aircraft	Introduced	Retired	Notes
Airbus A300-600	2011	—	
Airbus A310	2009	2011	
Airbus A320-200	2009	2010	leased to Iran Air
Boeing 747-200	2010	—	

== See also ==
- List of airlines of Armenia
