= Iberia Express =

Low-cost airline of Spain

Iberia Express Compañía Operadora de Corto y Medio Radio Iberia Express S.A.U

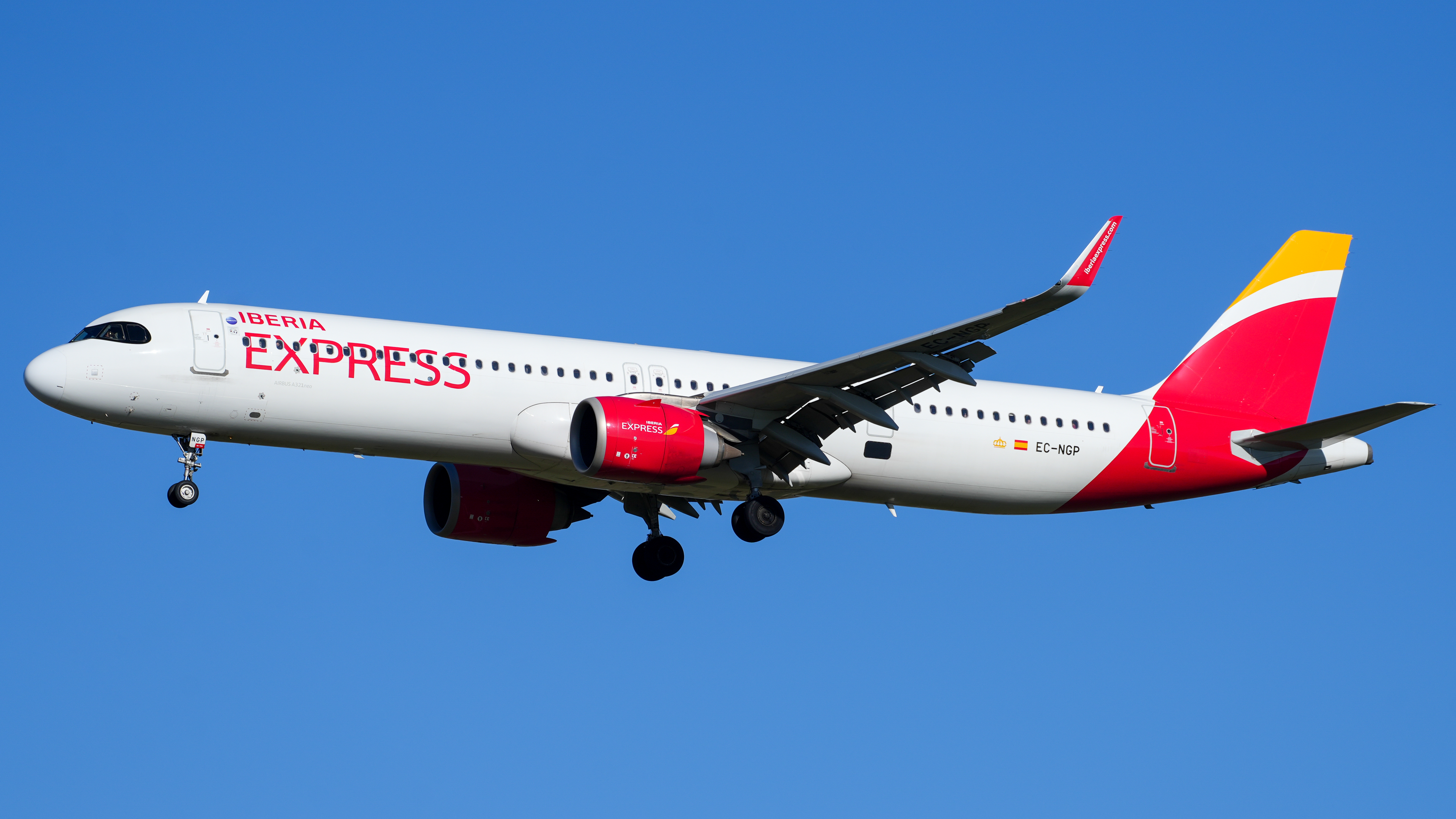
- Iberia Express A321neo
IATA	ICAO	Call sign
I2	IBS	IBEREXPRES
- Founded: October 2011; 15 years ago
- Commenced operations: 25 March 2012; 14 years ago
- Hubs: Madrid
- Alliance: Oneworld (affiliate)
- Fleet size: 25
- Destinations: 22
- Parent company: Iberia; International Airlines Group
- Headquarters: Timón, Barajas, Madrid, Spain
- Key people: Fernando Candela (CEO)
- Website: iberiaexpress.com

Iberia Express is a Spanish low-cost airline owned by Iberia, which operates short- and medium-haul routes from its parent airline's hub at Adolfo Suárez Madrid–Barajas Airport, providing feeder flights onto Iberia's long-haul network.

== History ==
IAG announced the launch of Iberia Express on 6 October 2011, leading to strike action by pilots in late December 2011 due to concerns over potential job losses caused by the new airline. Aircraft from other Iberia routes would be switched to the new subsidiary, and new pilots and cabin crew hired to operate the flights. Iberia intended for the new airline to cover routes operated at a loss by the main airline, running with lower operating costs.

Iberia Express began operating on 25 March 2012, sharing its head office with Iberia in Chamartín, Madrid. The new airline began operations with a fleet of four Airbus A320 aircraft using a two-class Business and Economy configuration.

== Destinations ==
As of September 2020, the following destinations are served by Iberia Express:

Country	City	Airport	Notes	Refs
Croatia	Zadar	Zadar Airport	Terminated	
Denmark	Copenhagen	Copenhagen Airport		
France	Lyon	Lyon–Saint-Exupéry Airport	Terminated	
France	Nice	Nice Côte d'Azur Airport	Terminated	
France	Paris	Charles de Gaulle Airport		
France	Rennes	Rennes–Saint-Jacques Airport	Terminated	
France	Toulouse	Toulouse–Blagnac Airport	Terminated	
Germany	Stuttgart	Stuttgart Airport	Terminated	
Greece	Heraklion	Heraklion International Airport	Seasonal	
Greece	Mykonos	Mykonos Airport	Seasonal	
Greece	Santorini	Santorini (Thira) International Airport	Seasonal	
Netherlands	Amsterdam	Amsterdam Airport Schiphol		
Iceland	Keflavík	Keflavík International Airport	Seasonal	
Ireland	Cork	Cork Airport	Terminated	
Ireland	Dublin	Dublin Airport		
Israel	Tel Aviv	Ben Gurion Airport		
Italy	Cagliari	Cagliari Elmas Airport	Terminated	
Italy	Naples	Naples International Airport		
Italy	Palermo	Falcone Borsellino Airport	Terminated	
Poland	Kraków	Kraków John Paul II International Airport	Terminated	
Romania	Bucharest	Henri Coandă International Airport	Terminated	
Spain	Asturias	Asturias Airport		
Spain	Fuerteventura	Fuerteventura Airport		
Spain	Gran Canaria	Gran Canaria Airport		
Spain	Ibiza	Ibiza Airport		
Spain	La Palma	La Palma Airport		
Spain	Lanzarote	Lanzarote Airport		
Spain	Madrid	Madrid–Barajas Airport	Hub	
Spain	Málaga	Málaga Airport		
Spain	Menorca	Menorca Airport		
Spain	Palma de Mallorca	Palma de Mallorca Airport		
Spain	Santiago de Compostela	Santiago–Rosalía de Castro Airport		
Spain	Seville	Seville Airport		
Spain	Tenerife	Tenerife North–Ciudad de La Laguna Airport		
Spain	Tenerife	Tenerife South Airport		
Spain	Vigo	Vigo–Peinador Airport		
United Kingdom	Birmingham	Birmingham Airport	Terminated	
United Kingdom	Cardiff	Cardiff Airport	Terminated	
United Kingdom	Edinburgh	Edinburgh Airport	Seasonal	
United Kingdom	London	Gatwick Airport		
United Kingdom	Manchester	Manchester Airport		
United Kingdom	Newcastle	Newcastle Airport	Terminated	

== Fleet ==
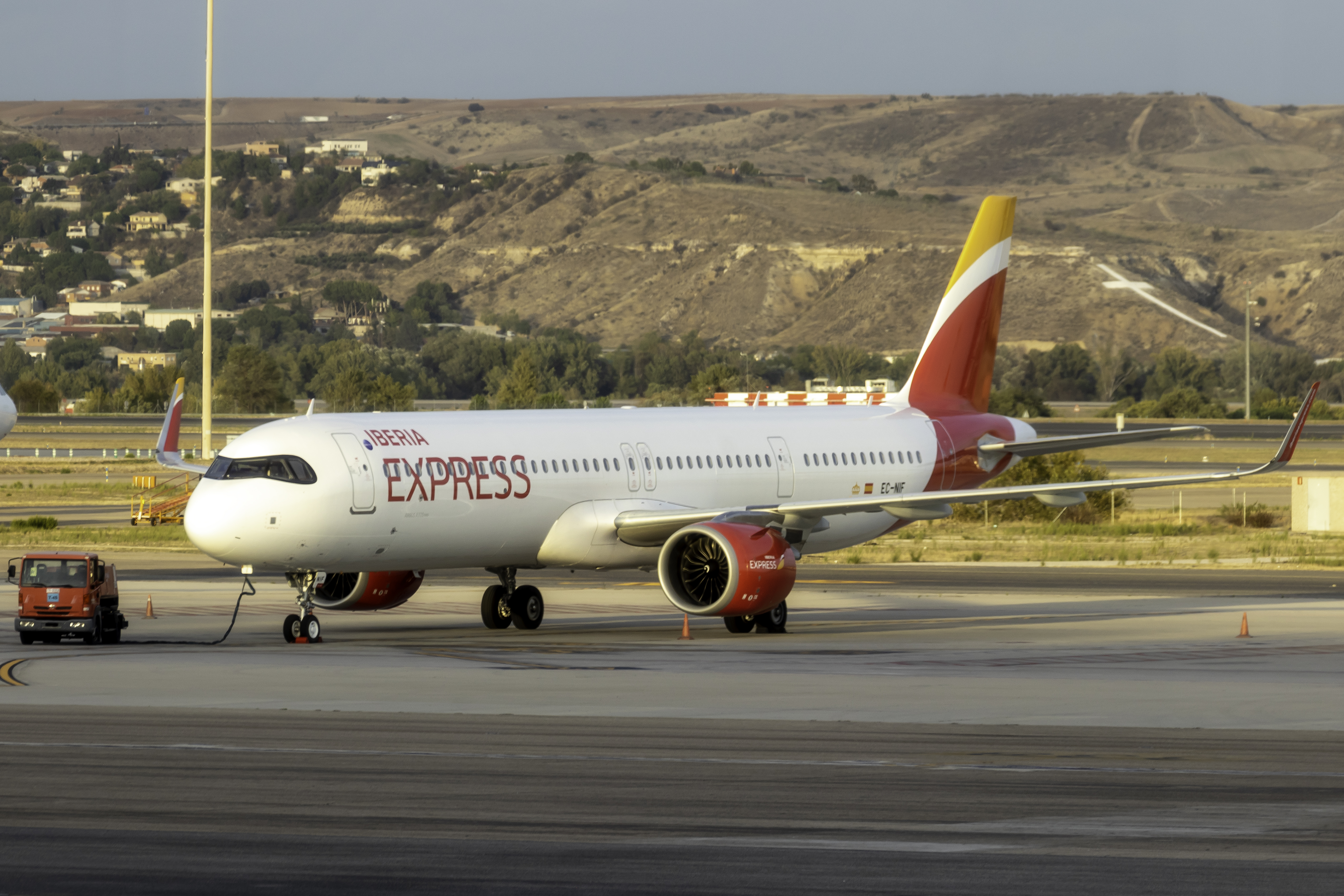
Iberia Express Airbus A321neo

As of October 2025, Iberia Express operates an all-Airbus fleet composed of the following aircraft:

Iberia Express fleet
Aircraft	In service	Orders	Passengers	Notes
Airbus A320-200	13	—	180	
Airbus A321neo	12	5	232	Original order for 25 A321neo aircraft, 17 A321neo and 8 A321XLR, out of which Iberia will only keep the long-range XLRs after transferring the shorter-range neos to Iberia Express.
Total	25	5		

== On-time performance ==
Iberia Express was recognized as the most on-time airline in Europe for 2023. Cirium identified the airline's on-time performance rate at 84.58%, whereas the average for Europe was 80.82%.
