= International Airlines Group =

Anglo-Spanish airline holding company

International Consolidated Airlines Group S.A.

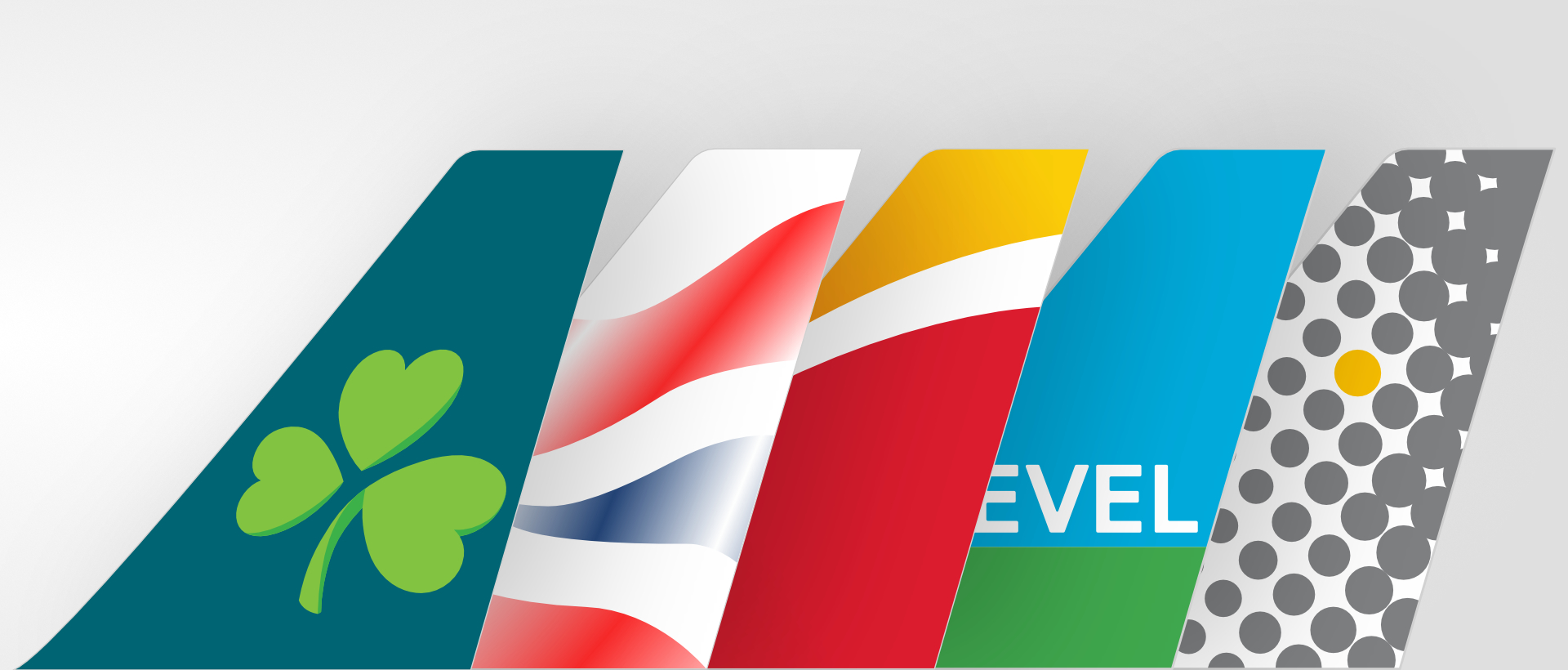
- Type: Sociedad Anónima
- Traded as: BMAD: IAG; LSE: IAG; IBEX 35 component FTSE 100 component
- ISIN: ES0177542018
- Industry: Aviation
- Predecessor: British Airways; Iberia
- Founded: 21 January 2011; 15 years ago
- Headquarters: Registered office: Madrid, Spain; Corporate headquarters: London, England, UK
- Area served: Worldwide
- Key people: Javier Ferrán (Chairman); Luis Gallego (CEO)
- Services: Airline services; Passenger air transport services; Air freight services
- Revenue: ▲€33.213 billion (2025)
- Operating income: ▲€5.024 billion (2025)
- Net income: ▲€3.342 billion (2025)
- Total assets: ▼€42.849 billion (2025)
- Total equity: ▲€7.594 billion (2025)
- Owner: As of September 2025: Qatar Airways: 26.5%
- Number of employees: 75,871 (2025)
- Subsidiaries: Aer Lingus; Aer Lingus Regional; Avios Group; British Airways; BA CityFlyer; BA EuroFlyer; IAG Cargo; Iberia; Iberia Express; LEVEL; Vueling
- Website: www.iairgroup.com

International Consolidated Airlines Group S.A., trading as International Airlines Group and usually shortened to IAG, is an Anglo-Spanish multinational airline holding company with its registered office in Madrid, Spain, and its corporate headquarters in London, England. It was formed in January 2011 after a merger agreement between British Airways and Iberia, the flag carriers of the United Kingdom and Spain respectively, when both became wholly owned subsidiaries of IAG. British Airways shareholders were given 55% of the shares in the new company.

Since its creation, IAG has expanded its portfolio of operations and brands by purchasing other airlines – BMI (2011), Vueling (2012) and Aer Lingus (2015). The group also owns LEVEL and Avios, a frequent-flyer programme.

The company is listed on the London Stock Exchange and the Madrid Stock Exchange. It is a constituent of the FTSE 100 Index and IBEX 35 Index.

== History ==
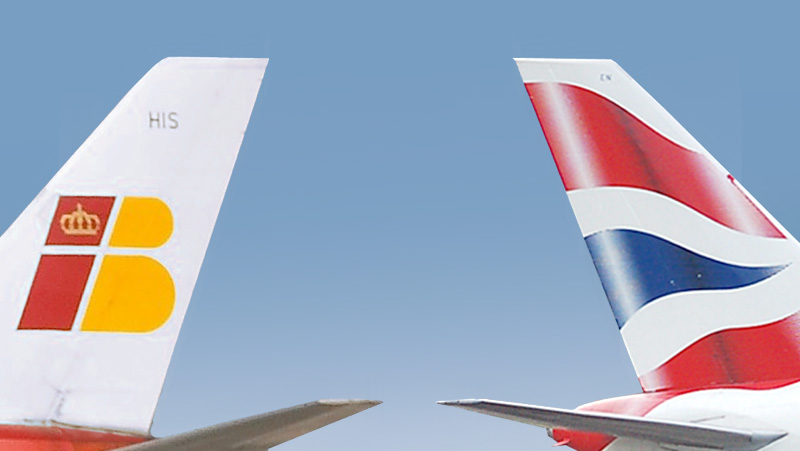
Iberia and British Airways aircraft tails, early 2010s

=== Creation of IAG as BA/Iberia holding company ===
British Airways and Iberia signed a preliminary merger agreement in November 2009. In April 2010, they signed a full merger agreement, with an intended completion date of late 2010, subject to securing the necessary regulatory approvals. The merger between British Airways and Iberia was completed on 21 January 2011, and shares in the new holding company IAG began trading in London and Madrid on 24 January.

On 6 October 2011, IAG created Iberia Express, a new low-cost airline to operate short- and medium-haul routes from IAG's Madrid hub and provide transfer feed onto Iberia's longhaul network. Iberia Express began operations on 25 March 2012.

=== Purchase of BMI (2011) ===
On 4 November 2011, IAG agreed in principle to acquire British Midland International (BMI) from Lufthansa, in a deal which would increase IAG's share of slots at Heathrow airport from 45% to 54%. On 22 December 2011, IAG agreed a binding deal with Lufthansa to acquire BMI for £172.5 million. On 30 March 2012, the purchase was approved, subject to the condition that the combined group divest itself of 12 daily slots and lease two daily slots at Heathrow airport. The acquisition was completed on 20 April 2012, and the BMI fleet and routes were integrated into the British Airways schedule throughout 2012. Slaughter and May advised IAG on the BMI acquisition.

=== Purchase of Vueling, and creation of IAG Cargo (2012) ===
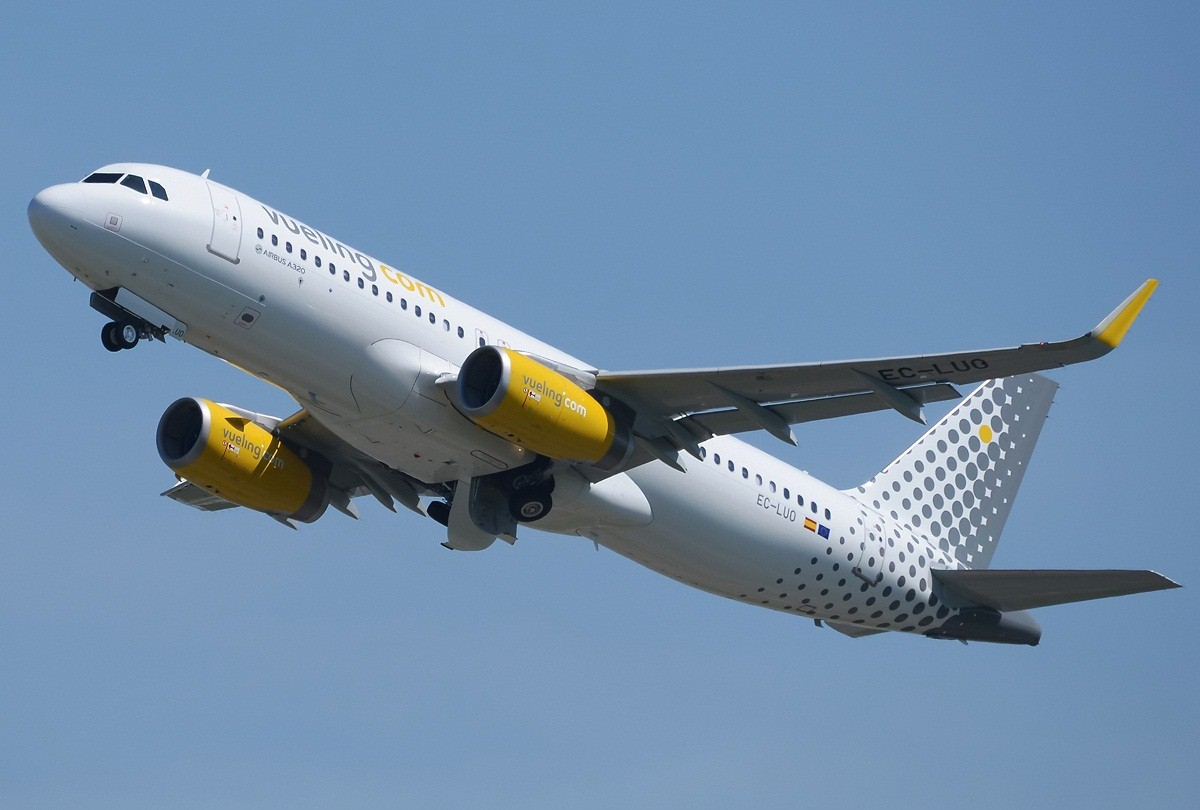
Vueling Airbus A320-200

On 8 November 2012, IAG made a cash tender offer to buy Vueling, a Spanish low-cost airline based in Barcelona. The offer was €7 per ordinary share of Vueling, with the total cost of acquisition anticipated to be €113m. It was funded from internal IAG resources. The reported total assets of Vueling as of 30 September 2012 were €805m and in the nine months to 30 September 2012 it had generated profits before tax of €59m. An increased offer of €9.25 was accepted by the Vueling board on 9 April 2013, and received majority shareholder approval on 23 April 2013. IAG took control of Vueling on 26 April 2013.

In December 2012, IAG completed the merger of the cargo operations of British Airways, BMI and Iberia into a single business unit, IAG Cargo.

=== Purchase of Aer Lingus (2015) ===
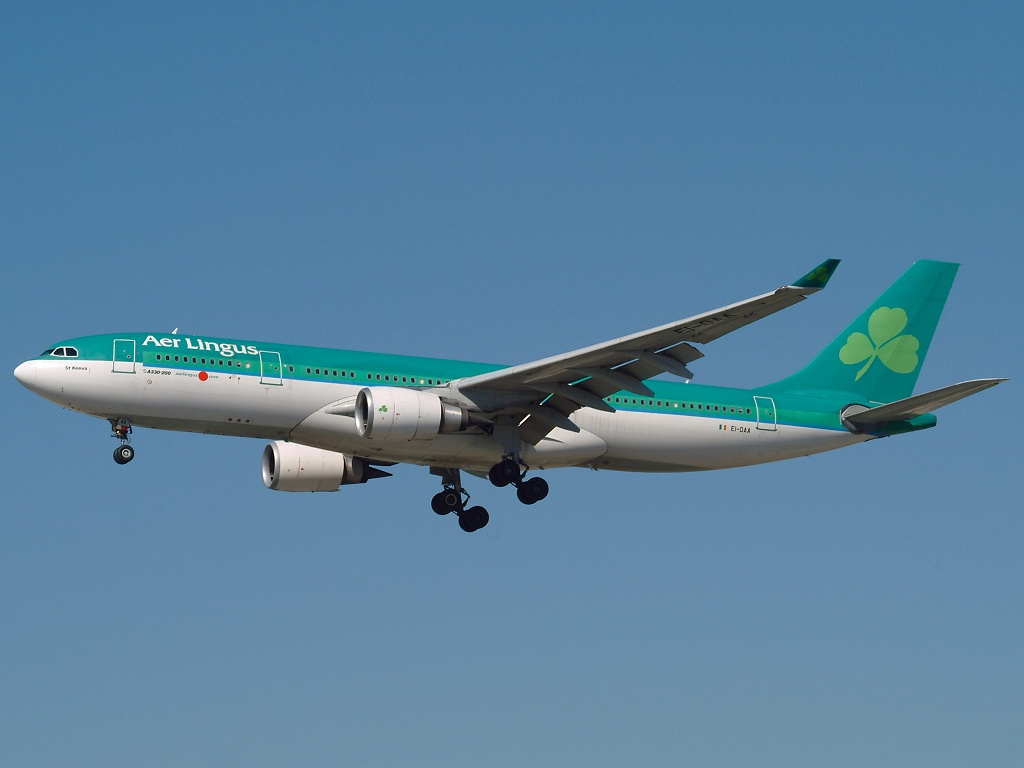
Aer Lingus Airbus A330-200

In January 2015, IAG made a bid of €1.36 billion for Aer Lingus. This was expected to be accepted after the rejection of two prior bids. In May 2015, the Irish government agreed to sell its stake in Aer Lingus to IAG, as did the Aer Lingus board in late January 2015. The takeover became irreversible on 18 August 2015.

=== Creation of LEVEL brand ===
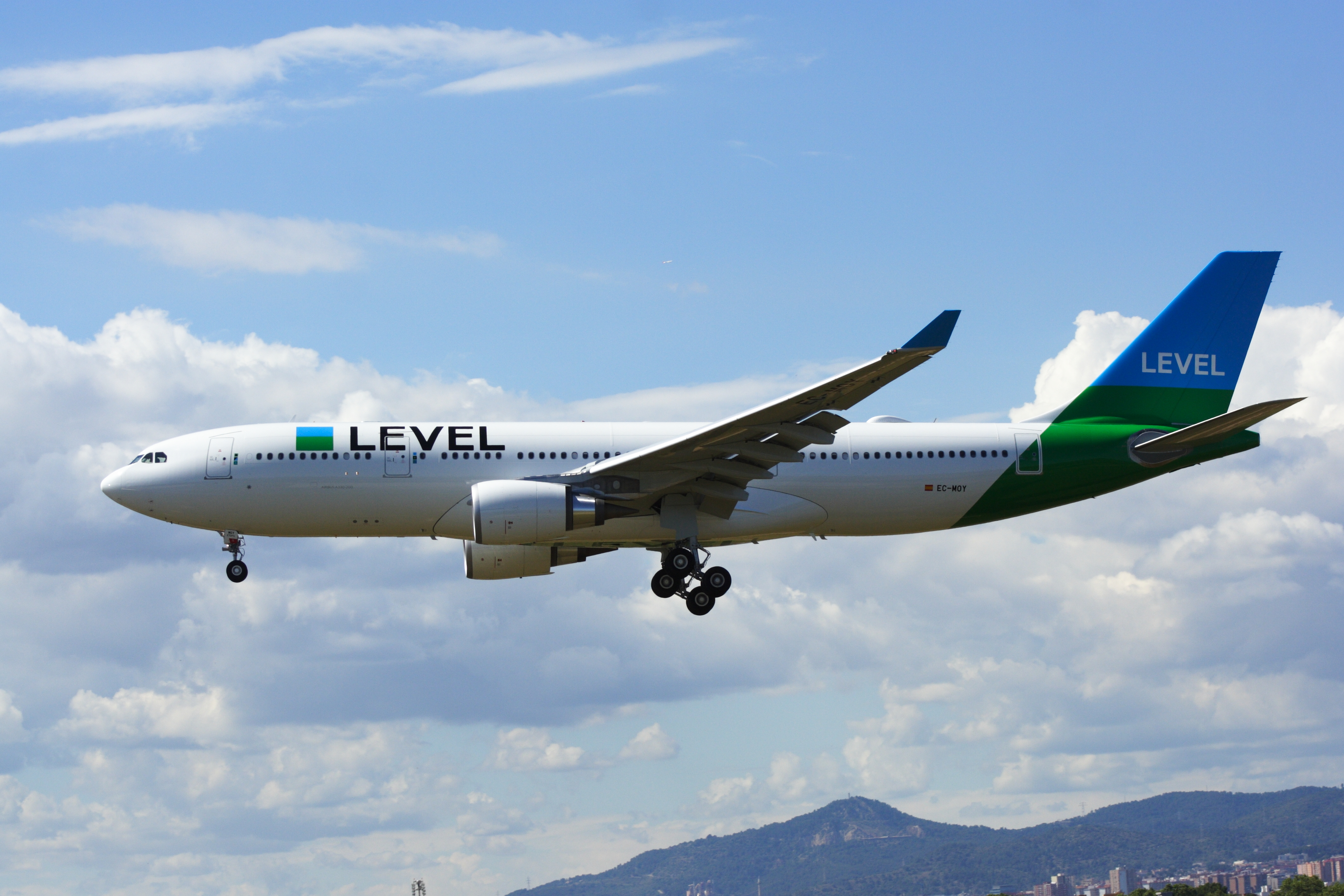
LEVEL Airbus A330-200

In March 2017, it was announced that a new low cost longhaul airline named LEVEL was to start operating from Barcelona in June 2017.

On 29 December 2017, it was announced that IAG bought major parts of defunct Austrian leisure airline Niki including 15 Airbus A321 aircraft and traffic rights in Düsseldorf, Munich, Vienna, Zürich and Palma de Mallorca. It is planned to establish a new Austrian subsidiary of Vueling as a replacement for Niki.

=== Aborted Norwegian takeover, and group fleet orders ===
In April 2018, it was reported that IAG was considering a takeover of Norwegian, a low-budget competitor to the group, however, by early 2019, IAG had fully disposed of its stake in Norwegian.

At the 2019 Paris Air Show, IAG signed a letter of intent to purchase 200 Boeing 737 MAX aircraft consisting of the 737 MAX 8 and 737 MAX 10 variants to be allocated to the group's various airlines even though at the time of the signing the 737 MAX was still grounded worldwide following the two fatal crashes likely caused by the design of the MCAS system. Aviation analysts have questioned IAG's leadership in making such an order when the 737 MAX design is still being rectified. IAG CEO Willie Walsh shrugged off the plane's uncertain future. "We're partnering with the Boeing brand", he said. "That's the brand that I'm doing business with. That's the brand that I’ve worked with for years. And it's a brand that I trust".

Also at the 2019 Paris Air Show, IAG agreed to purchase 14 Airbus A321XLR aircraft, 8 for delivery to Iberia and 6 to Aer Lingus, with options for a further 14 of the aircraft.

On 19 May 2022, IAG finalised the purchase of 50 Boeing 737 MAX aircraft consisting of the 737 MAX 200 and 737 MAX 10 variants with 100 options to be allocated to the group's various airlines, which was originally announced at the 2019 Paris Air Show.

On 9 May 2025, IAG ordered up to 76 aircraft from Airbus and Boeing, out of which 32 firm orders and 10 options for the Boeing 787-10 will be allocated to British Airways, and 21 firm orders and 13 options for the Airbus A330-900 will be allocated to Aer Lingus, Iberia and LEVEL. It also revealed the firming of options for 18 additional aircraft, including six Airbus A350-1000 aircraft and six Boeing 777-9 aircraft for British Airways, and six Airbus A350-900 aircraft for Iberia.

On 1 August 2025, IAG confirmed that the Boeing 737 MAX order will be allocated to Vueling to replace their older Airbus A320ceo aircraft.

=== Investment in Air Europa ===
In November 2019, IAG announced that it planned to acquire Air Europa from Globalia, for €1 billion. The deal, funded by external debt, and was expected to be completed in the second half of 2020, subject to regulatory approval. On 20 January 2021, IAG announced that it had renegotiated its deal to acquire Air Europa (via Iberia) for €500 million as a result of the COVID-19 pandemic. It also negotiated to delay payment to Globalia for 6 years. Completion of the deal was expected to take place in the second half of 2021 with the acquisition subject to approval by the European Commission.

In September 2021, IAG announced that British Airways would terminate its major short- and medium-haul base operations at Gatwick Airport with immediate effect resulting in the cancellation of more than 30 routes. This came after labour negotiations regarding the handover of these operations, most of which were still suspended due to the COVID-19 pandemic, to a newly formed budget subsidiary within IAG failed. In August 2022, IAG converted a loan to Air Europa into a 20% shareholding.

On 23 February 2023, IAG announced completion of a deal to purchase the remaining 80% of Air Europa for 400 million euros.

The European Commission, in January 2024, opened an in-depth investigation into proposed acquisition of Air Europa by IAG. Some of the markets competition concerns were: 1) Spanish domestic routes, including those between peninsular Spain and the Balearic and Canary Islands; 2) Short haul routes between Madrid and some of the main EEA, plus routes between Madrid and Israel, Morocco, the UK and Switzerland; and 3) Long haul routes between Madrid and North and South America. The deal was scrapped in August 2024.

On 5 June 2025, influential proxy adviser ISS urged IAG investors to vote against a remuneration policy which includes a one-off share award for CEO Luis Gallego, at the group’s next annual general meeting on 18 June.

== Corporate affairs ==
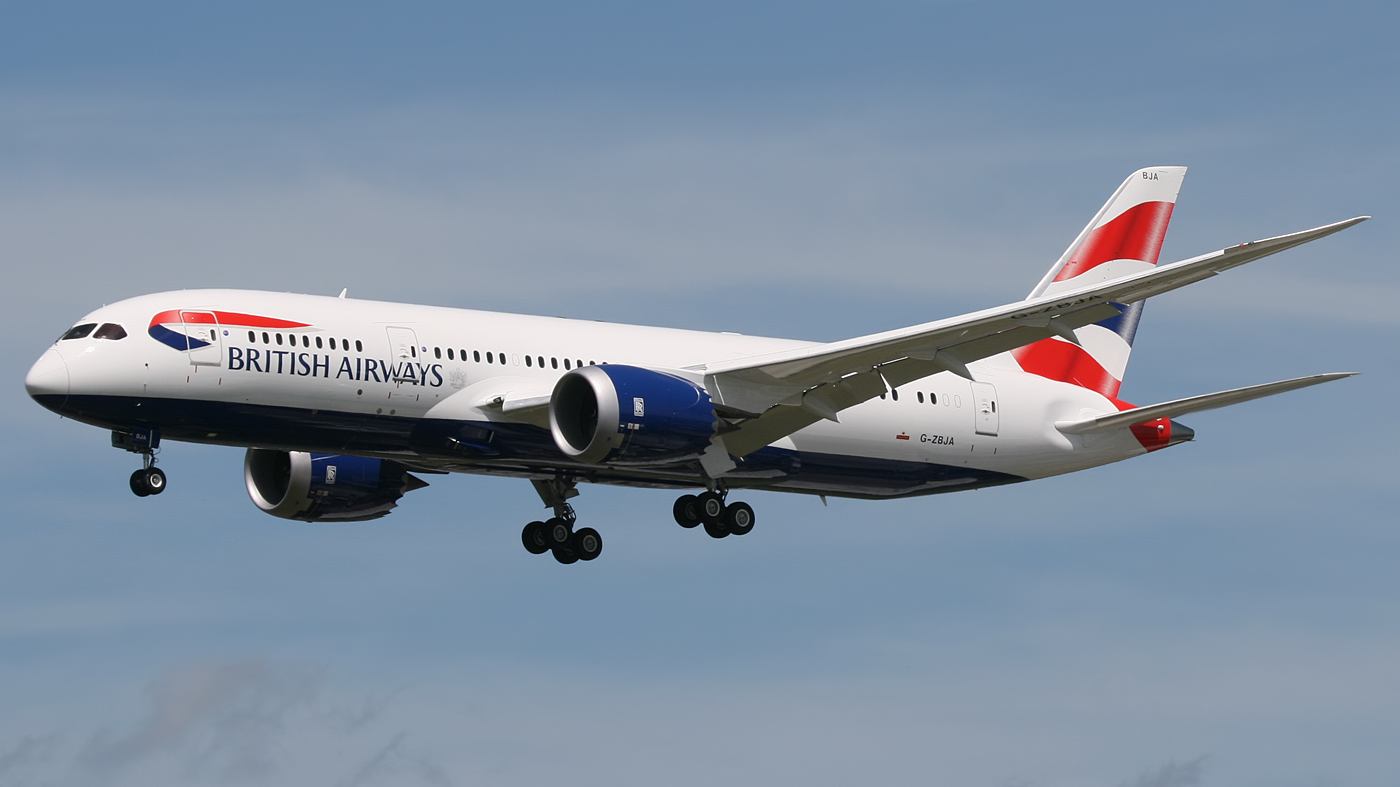
British Airways Boeing 787-8

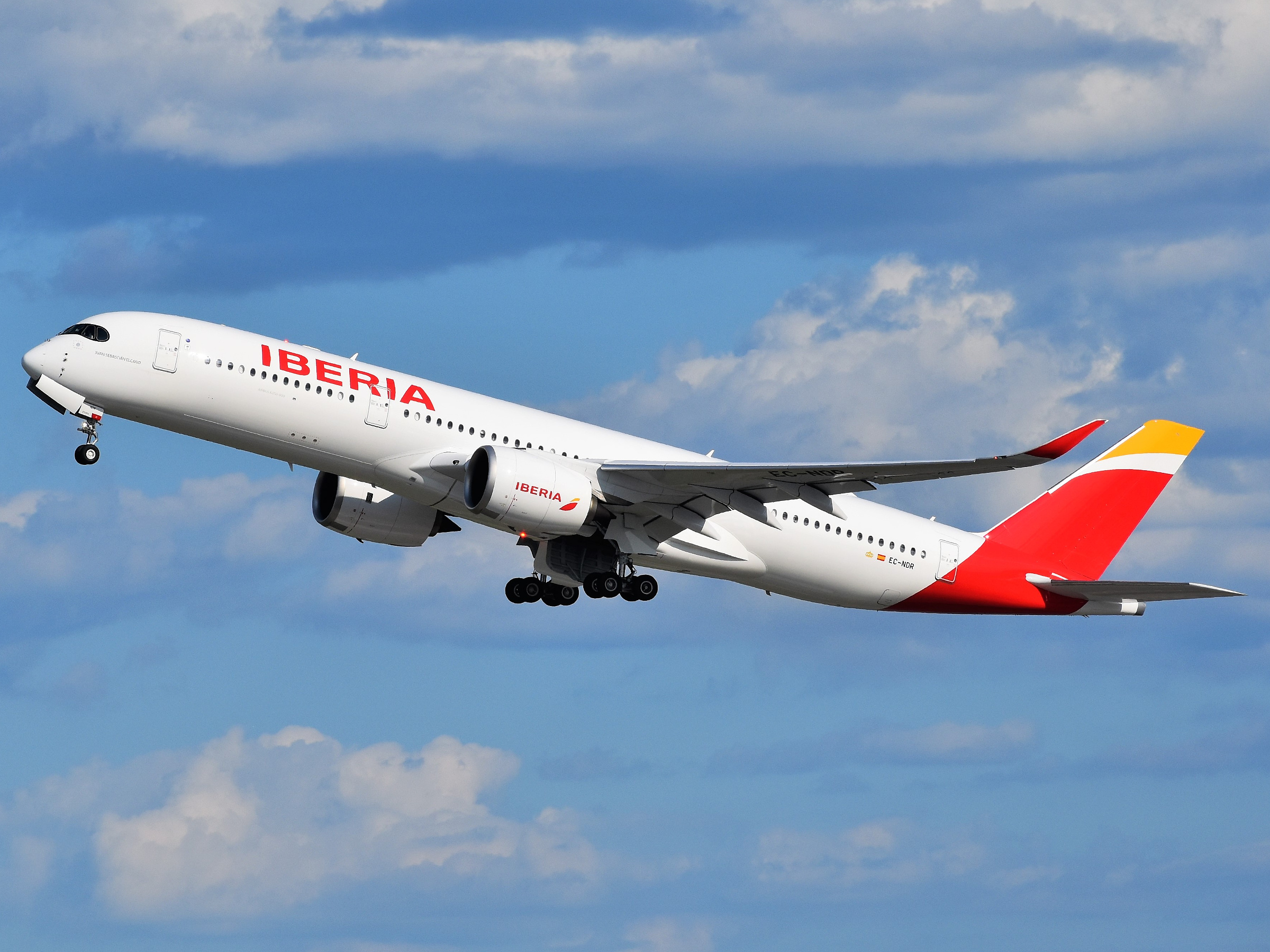
Iberia Airbus A350-900

=== Overview ===
IAG is incorporated as a Sociedad Anónima in Spain, where the company board meetings are held, and is domiciled in Spain for tax purposes. IAG has a primary listing on the London Stock Exchange and has been a FTSE 100 constituent since 24 January 2011. It has secondary listings on the Madrid, Barcelona, Bilbao and Valencia stock exchanges, and has been a constituent of the IBEX 35 index since 1 April 2011.

In March 2015, Qatar Airways purchased a 10% stake in International Airlines Group for €1.2 billion (US$1.26 billion). Within a year, it increased its ownership to 20%, becoming the single largest shareholder, and stating that it will not be buying any more. In early 2020, a few weeks after IAG removed a cap on non-EU investments, Qatar Airways increased its stake from 21.4% to 25.1%, costing a further US$600 million.

IAG's operational headquarters, which controls the management of both its British and Spanish subsidiaries, are at the Waterside building in Harmondsworth, Greater London.

=== Group structure ===
The structure of the main operating companies is:

Airline	Affiliates	Non-IAG affiliate airline
Aer Lingus	Aer Lingus UK	Aer Lingus Regional (franchise)
British Airways	BA CityFlyer; BA EuroFlyer	
Iberia	Iberia Express	Air Nostrum (franchise, trading as Iberia Regional)
LEVEL	—N/a	—N/a
Vueling	—N/a	—N/a
Other subsidiaries
IAG Cargo (merger between Iberia Cargo and British Airways World Cargo); IAG Loyalty (operates Avios, the IAG frequent-flyer currency)

=== Group business trends ===
The key trends for the International Airlines Group are shown below (as at year ending 31 December):

	Turnover (€bn)	Net profit (€bn)	Number of employees (Note: on average)	Number of passengers (m)	Passenger load factor (%)	Cargo carried (000s tonnes)	Number of aircraft (Note: operational, at year end)	Notes/sources
2011	16.3	0.48	56,791	51.7	79.1	1,050	348	
2012	18.1	−0.92	59,574	54.6	80.3	1,011	377	
2013	18.6	0.14	60,089	67.2	80.8	928	431	
2014	20.1	1.0	59,484	77.3	79.7	897	459	
2015	20.3	1.5	60,862	88.3	79.7	661	529	
2016	22.5	1.9	63,387	100	80.5	680	548	
2017	22.9	2.0	63,422	104	81.4	701	546	
2018	24.4	2.8	64,734	112	81.9	702	573	
2019	25.5	1.7	66,034	118	82.6	682	598	
2020	7.8	−6.9	34,620	31.3	63.8	444	533	
2021	8.4	−2.9	35,035	38.9	64.5	539	531	
2022	23.0	0.43	59,800	94.7	81.8	561	558	
2023	29.4	2.6	69,762	115	85.3	596	582	
2024	32.1	2.7	73,498	122	86.5	651	601	
2025	33.2	3.3	75,871	121	85.6	652	627	

In 2012, it was reported that British Airways' profits had been wiped out by Iberia's losses, and that the Spanish airline was in a fight for its survival. By 2013, Iberia had lost a billion euros, requiring IAG CEO Willie Walsh to defend the IAG merger. After further losses, IAG's balance sheet was in deep deficit as Iberia fought low-cost competition and a recession, and Walsh admitted that British Airways should perhaps have postponed the merger, saying, "If I'd known the Spanish economy was going to deteriorate to the scale that it did, we may have delayed the decision but ultimately I believe the merger is the right thing". From 2014 onwards, Iberia returned to profitability, showing Walsh's predictions had been justified.

In February 2021, IAG said that it has lost about €7 billion due to the COVID-19 pandemic in 2020, but it had €10.3 billion of liquid funds to get through the crisis.

=== Senior leadership ===
- Chairman: Javier Ferrán (since January 2021)
- Chief executive: Luis Gallego (since September 2020)

==== List of former chairmen ====
- Antonio Vázquez Romero (2011–2021)

==== List of former chief executives ====
- Willie Walsh (2011–2020)

== Operations ==
=== Subsidiary airlines ===
British Airways, Iberia, Aer Lingus, Vueling and LEVEL operate under their separate brand names.

For details of the current aircraft operated by the group, see the fleet details for each of the main operating subsidiaries - Iberia, British Airways, Aer Lingus and Vueling. The entire company serves around 200 destinations.

=== Group frequent-flyer programme ===
IAG Loyalty operates the frequent-flyer programme Avios, which was created from the merger of the Air Miles, BA Miles, and Iberia Plus Points schemes on 16 November 2011. Avios is the frequent flyer currency of Aer Lingus, British Airways, Finnair, Iberia (including subsidiary Iberia Express and affiliate Air Nostrum, which operates as Iberia Regional), LEVEL, Qatar Airways, Vueling and Loganair, and can also be used for travel within the oneworld alliance including the likes of American Airlines, Cathay Pacific, Japan Airlines, Qantas, etc. A restructure in 2015 meant that all of IAG's affiliated loyalty programmes which use Avios, including Avios Travel Reward Programme, British Airways Executive Club, and Iberia Plus, were transferred to Avios Group, an IAG subsidiary.

It was announced in July 2018, that Avios.com would close to British Airways Executive Club members, with all points automatically transferred to British Airways. Qatar Airways, the largest shareholder of IAG, switched to Avios as its frequent flyer currency in March 2022. Fellow oneworld alliance member Finnair also adopted Avios as its currency for Finnair Plus in March 2024. In January 2025, Scottish airline Loganair announced its Clan Loganair loyalty programme would adopt Avios as its frequent flyer currency later that year. In April 2025, the British Airways Executive Club was rebranded as "The British Airways Club."
