= Willie Walsh (businessman) =

Irish airline executive

William Matthew Walsh
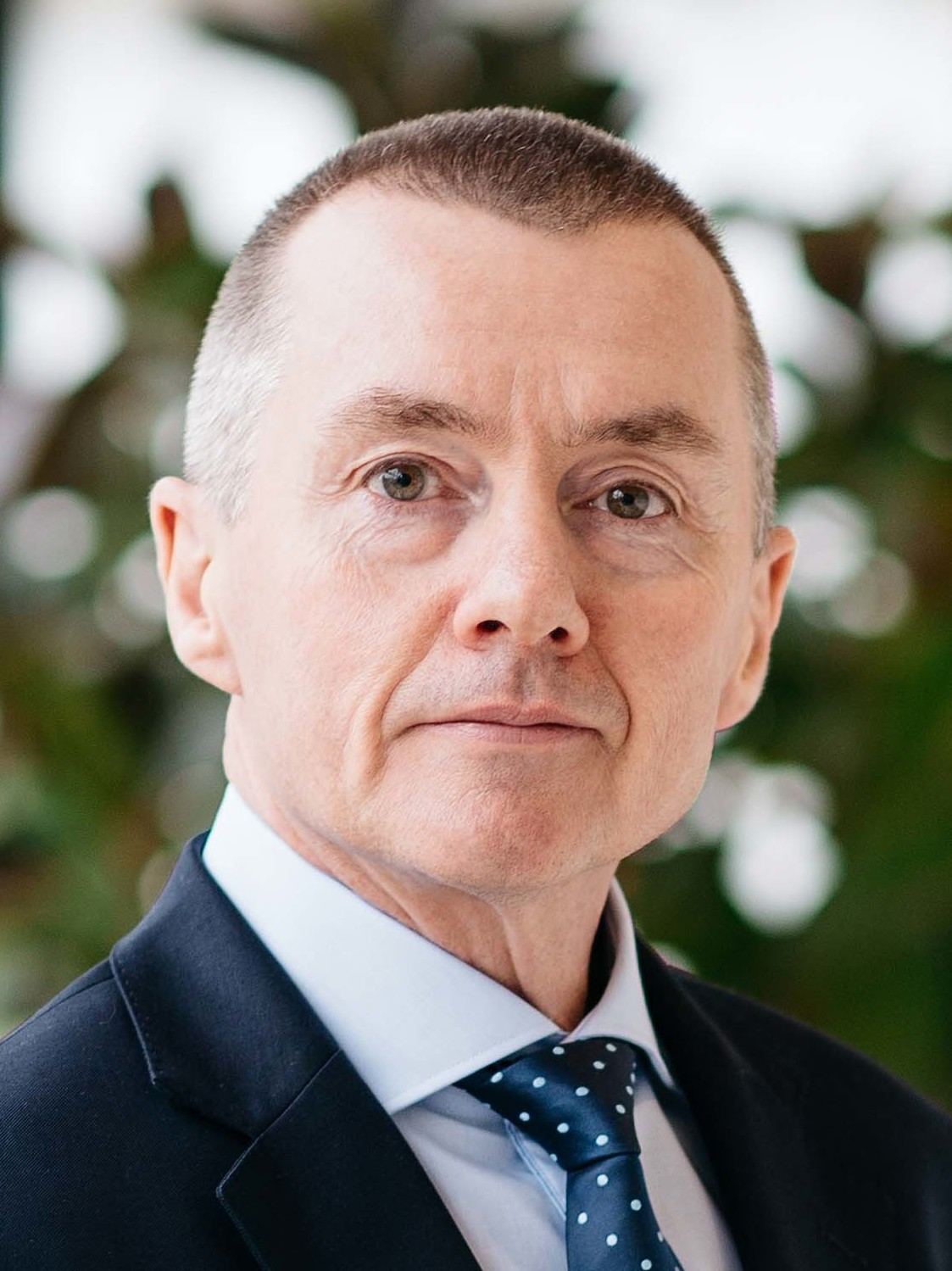
- Walsh in 2016
- Born: 25 October 1961 (age 64); Dublin, Ireland
- Other name: Willie Walsh
- Education: Trinity College, Dublin (MBA)
- Occupation: Businessman
- Employer: IndiGo
- Title: CEO

William Matthew Walsh (born 25 October 1961) is an Irish airline executive and the chief executive officer of IndiGo. Until 2020, he was CEO of International Airlines Group, and had previously been CEO of Aer Lingus and British Airways, as well as Director General of International Air Transport Association.

== Early life ==
Walsh was born in Dublin, Ireland. He attended his local secondary school Ardscoil Rís. At age 17 he became a pilot at Irish flag carrier Aer Lingus, joining as a cadet in 1979. He acquired a master's degree in management and business administration from Trinity College, Dublin, during his pilot years, while advancing to become a Boeing 737 captain.

He joined company management in various positions including chief executive of then company subsidiary, Futura from 1998 to 2000. He returned to Aer Lingus in 2000 as chief operating officer (COO).

== Career ==
In October 2001, Walsh was elevated from COO to CEO of Aer Lingus, succeeding Michael Foley, who had resigned following a harassment complaint. The carrier was in financial difficulty. Walsh eliminated 2,000 staff positions and reconfigured Aer Lingus as a low-cost airline. He also withdrew various services like short-haul Business Class and restricted the airline's frequent-flyer programme, TAB.

The company operating profits rebounded, but the cost of the write-offs and redundancies meant that net profitability was not as quick to recover. Not all of Walsh's reforms were successful, such as the outsourcing of aircraft cleaning. The contracting had not been agreed with Aer Lingus unions, which led to large payments to the private contractor while Aer Lingus employees did the cleaning work. A three-day lock-out occurred in 2002 during the peak of the cutbacks.

The management team suggested to the principal shareholder, the Irish Government, a float of Aer Lingus on the stock market. Stock floats are often rewarding to top management and this was opposed by the unions who feared a privatised Aer Lingus would impose even tougher working conditions. The government eventually turned down the float, and Walsh resigned from the company in January 2005.

The taoiseach Bertie Ahern subsequently described Walsh's offer of an MBO as "a time when management wanted to steal the assets for themselves through a management buy out, shafting staff interests".

Dermot Mannion, formerly of Emirates, succeeded Walsh as Aer Lingus chief executive officer in August 2005.

He went to British Airways, where he would replace Rod Eddington at the end of his contract. Walsh was hired in May 2005, with a six-month shadowing period to get to know the business before the departure of Eddington in October 2005.

Walsh became CEO of British Airways in October 2005.

The major challenges for the airline industry were exacerbated by various natural events such as snow, fog and volcanic ash. He described the closure of European airspace in April 2010 over worries about the ash plume from an erupting Icelandic volcano as a "gross over-reaction to a very minor risk".

Walsh oversaw the merger of British Airways and Iberia forming a new holding company International Airlines Group (IAG) in January 2011. He also created a Joint Business Agreement with Iberia and American Airlines, meaning the three airlines now market and sell each other's seats and share revenue on trans-Atlantic routes.

On 24 January 2011, Walsh became chief executive of IAG, which is the parent company of BA and Iberia. Both airlines are members of the Oneworld alliance. It was announced on 9 January 2020 that he would be stepping down as CEO in March 2020, however Walsh announced on 16 March that he intended to delay his retirement in order to help the airline trade through the outbreak of COVID-19. Walsh officially retired from IAG in September 2020, and was succeeded by Luis Gallego.

On 24 November 2020, Walsh was appointed as the director general of the International Air Transport Association (IATA), effective from April 2021. Walsh was appointed chief executive officer of IndiGo in March 2026 following the resignation of Pieter Elbers, and assumed office on 3 August 2026 after concluding his tenure as Director General of IATA on 31 July 2026.

== Recognition ==
In March 2014, Aviation Week & Space Technology magazine named Walsh as its 2014 Laureate for Commercial Aviation.

== Personal life ==
Walsh has a daughter with his former wife.

Business positions
Preceded by Michael Foley	CEO of Aer Lingus; 2001–2005	Succeeded by Dermot Mannion
Preceded by Sir Rod Eddington	CEO of British Airways; 2005–2010	Succeeded by Keith Williams
New company	CEO of International Airlines Group; 2011–2020	Succeeded by Luis Gallego
Preceded by Alexandre de Juniac	Director General of the International Air Transport Association; 2021–2026	Succeeded by Sandrine Le Borgne (interim)
