= History of British Airways =

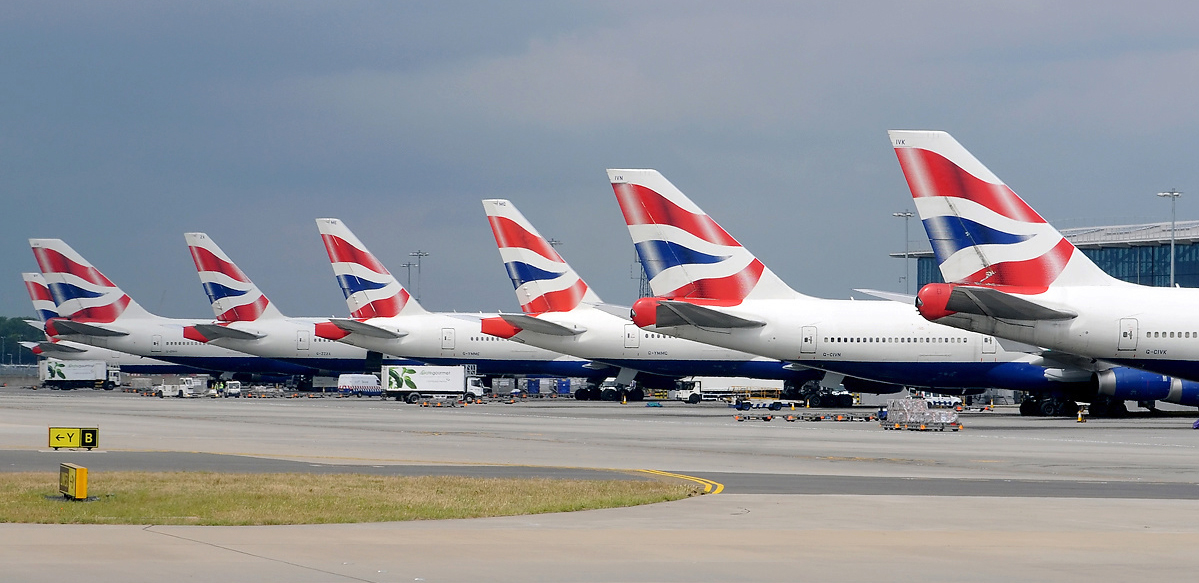
Heathrow Airport has been the main hub of British Airways since its formation; most activity has been based in the Terminal 5 complex since 2008.

The predecessor companies of British Airways (BA), the United Kingdom's national airline, go back to five airlines established in the United Kingdom between 1916 and 1922. The first of these was Aircraft Transport and Travel (AT&T), which operated the world's first daily scheduled international flight for commercial aviation in 1919.

The present company was formed in 1974 with the merger of the two largest UK airlines, British Overseas Airways Corporation (BOAC) and British European Airways (BEA), and including also two smaller regional airlines, Cambrian Airways and Northeast Airlines. The merger was the completion of a consolidation process started in 1971 with the establishment of the British Airways Board, a body created by the British government to control the operations and finances of BOAC and BEA, which initially continued to exist as separate entities.

British Airways acquired the supersonic Concorde in 1976, operating it on transatlantic services. The same year it assumed sole operation of international flights to North America and Southeast Asia from rival British Caledonian. The formation of Virgin Atlantic in 1984 began a tense rivalry, which led to "one of the most bitter and protracted libel actions in aviation history".

Under the leadership of Chairman Sir John King and CEO Colin Marshall, British Airways was privatised in February 1987, and in July of the same year, it launched the controversial takeover of British Caledonian. Following privatisation, British Airways entered a period of rapid growth, leading to the use of the slogan "The World's Favourite Airline", and dominated its domestic rivals during the early 1990s. Faced with increased competition and higher costs in the mid-1990s, CEO Bob Ayling led a restructuring effort, leading to trade union clashes; the carrier also invested in regional European airlines, courted international airline partnerships, and attempted a controversial ethnic livery rebranding campaign.

In the early 2000s, CEO Rod Eddington implemented further cost cuts, the retirement of Concorde, and the removal of ethnic liveries. Under Willie Walsh, who became CEO in 2005, British Airways faced a price-fixing scandal, moved its primary hub to Heathrow Terminal 5, and experienced threats of industrial action, leading to a strike in March 2010. On 8 April 2010, it was confirmed that British Airways and Iberia Airlines had agreed to a merger, forming the International Airlines Group, although BA continues to operate under its own brand. The combined airline became the world's third-largest carrier (after Delta Air Lines and American Airlines) in terms of annual revenue.

== 1910s to 1970s: Origins and expansion ==
- British Airways (1974)
  - 1949 merger into BOAC
    - British Overseas Airways Corporation (1939)
      - Imperial Airways (1924)
        - Daimler Airway (1921)
          - Aircraft Transport and Travel (1916)
          - Daimler Air Hire (1919)
        - Handley Page Transport (1919)
        - Instone Air Line (1919)
        - British Marine Air Navigation Co Ltd (1923)
      - British Airways Ltd (1936)
        - Allied British Airways (1935)
          - Hillman's Airways (1931)
          - Spartan Air Lines (1933)
          - United Airways Limited (1935)
        - British Continental Airways (1935)
    - British South American Airways (1946)
  - 1947 nationalisation into BEA
    - British European Airways (1946)
    - Railway Air Services (1934)
    - Isle of Man Air Services (1935)
    - Scottish Airways (1937)
      - Highland Airways (1933)
      - Northern & Scottish Airways (1935)

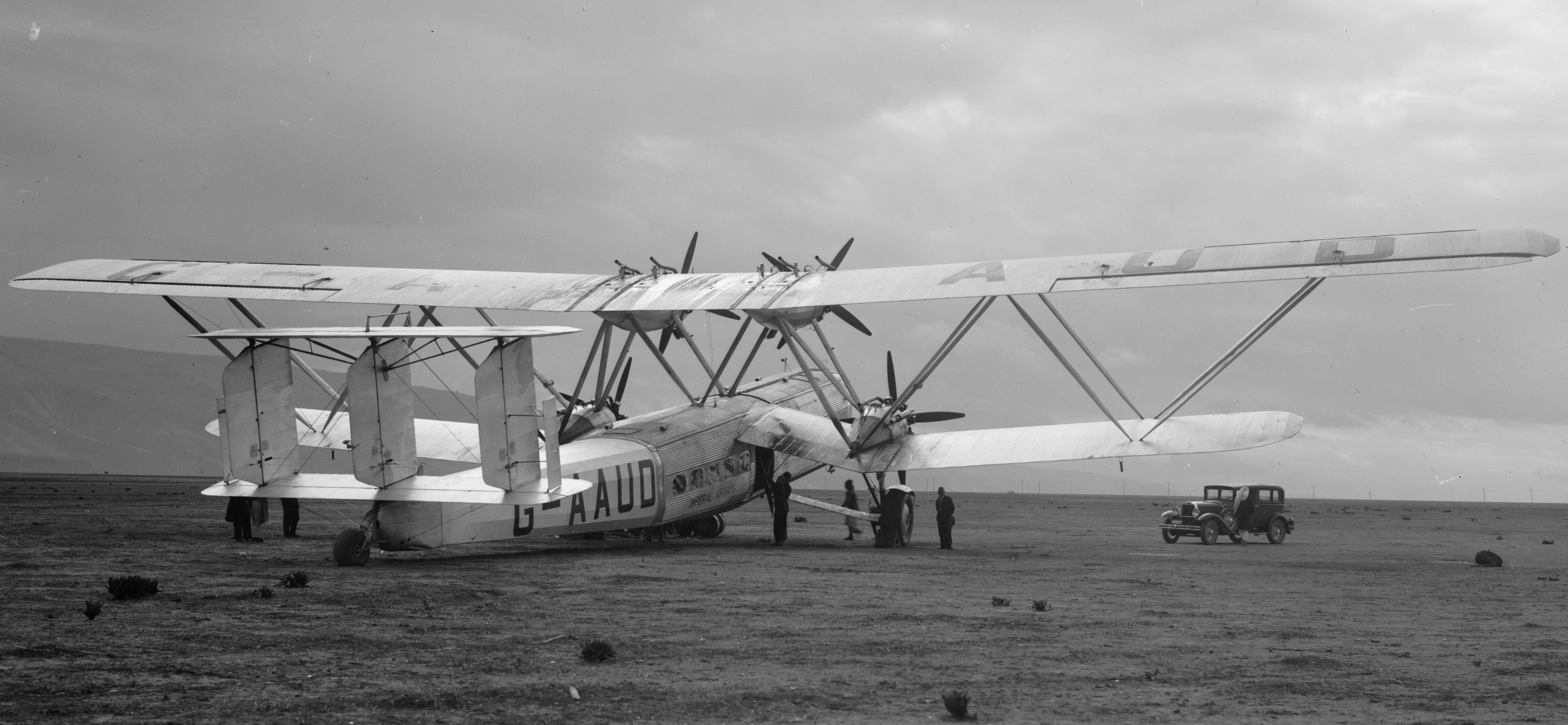
Imperial Airways Handley Page H.P.42. Hanno in 1931

British Airways earliest corporate ancestor is the first British airline, Aircraft Transport and Travel (AT&T), which was founded on 5 October 1916 as a subsidiary of Airco, an aircraft manufacturer. AT&T operated the world's first daily scheduled international flight for commercial aviation on 25 August 1919. Birmingham Small Arms Company (BSA) established Daimler Air Hire on 7 June 1919 and acquired AT&T and its parent Airco in 1920. After the Airco subsidiary, including AT&T, filed for bankruptcy, BSA acquired its aircraft from the liquidator and combined these assets with Daimler Air Hire to form Daimler Airway in 1921. On 31 March 1924, Daimler Airway joined with three other pioneer airlines that started up during the immediate post war period—Handley Page Transport (established in 1919), Instone Air Line (1919), and British Marine Air Navigation Co Ltd (1923)—to form Imperial Airways. Imperial developed routes throughout the British Empire to India, some parts of Africa and later to Canberra, Australia. Meanwhile, a number of smaller UK air transport companies had begun operating, and by 1935 many of these had merged to form the privately owned British Airways Ltd. Following a government review, Imperial Airways and British Airways were nationalised in November 1939 to form the British Overseas Airways Corporation (BOAC).

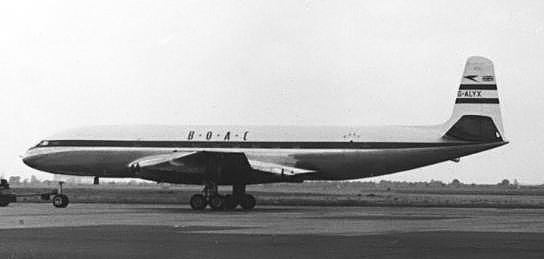
BOAC de Havilland Comet 1 at Heathrow Airport in 1953

Post-war, BOAC continued to operate the majority of long-haul services in Britain, other than routes to South America; these were flown by British South American Airways, which was merged back into BOAC in 1949. Continental European and domestic flights were flown by a new nationalised airline, British European Airways (BEA), which compulsorily took over the scheduled services of existing UK independent airlines. On 2 May 1952, BOAC became the world's first airline to operate jet airliners; the inaugural flight with the de Havilland Comet 1 was from London to Johannesburg. However, the Comet's service introduction was plagued by structural problems and accidents, leading to its withdrawal in 1954 and replacement with the upgraded Comet 4 models in 1958.

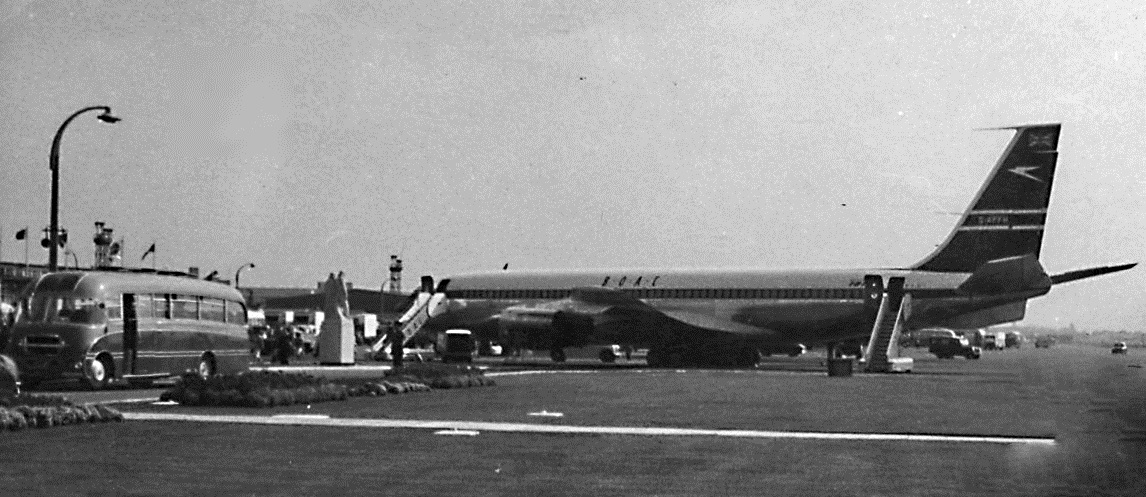
BOAC Boeing 707-400 at Heathrow Airport in 1960

The first attempt to create a new combined British airline through the merger of BOAC with BEA arose in 1953 out of inconclusive attempts between the two airlines to negotiate air rights through the British colony of Cyprus. The Chairman of BOAC, Miles Thomas, was in favour of the idea as a potential solution to a disagreement between the two airlines as to which should serve the increasingly important oil regions of the Middle East. In this proposal, Thomas had backing from the Chancellor of the Exchequer at the time, Rab Butler. However, opposition from the Treasury blocked the idea, and an agreement was reached instead to allow BEA to serve Ankara in Turkey, and in return to leave all routes east and south of Cyprus to BOAC. However, the solution was not entirely satisfactory to BOAC, as BEA's effective control of Cyprus Airways gave it the ability to continue to serve destinations ostensively ceded to BOAC, including Beirut and Cairo by using Cyprus Airways as its proxy.

In 1967, the government established a committee of inquiry into Civil Aviation under Sir Ronald Edwards. The Edwards Committee reported in 1969 and one of its recommendations was the formation of a National Air Holding Board to control finances and policies of the two corporations. The recommendation was enacted in 1971 with the passing of the Civil Aviation Act 1971, which formed a British Airways Board to control all the activities of BOAC and BEA, including the newly formed BEA Airtours subsidiary which targeted the emerging package holiday business.

Consequently, in 1972 the BOAC and BEA managements were combined under the newly formed British Airways Board, with the physical operations of the separate airlines coming together as British Airways on 1 April 1974, under the guidance of David Nicolson as chairman of the board. At the time it was the biggest merger in the aviation industry, creating the world's largest network of routes for the new unified company to harness. In 1975, British Airways was headquartered in the Victoria Terminal in London. Its international division was headquartered at Speedbird House by Heathrow Airport, while its European division was headquartered at Bealine House, Ruislip, Middlesex. The regional division was headquartered in Ruford House, Hounslow.

== 1970s: Consolidation and Concorde ==
Revenue Passenger-Kilometers, scheduled flights only, in millions
Year	Traffic
1975	25,463
1980	40,140
1985	41,103
1990	60,758
1995	93,860
2000	118,890

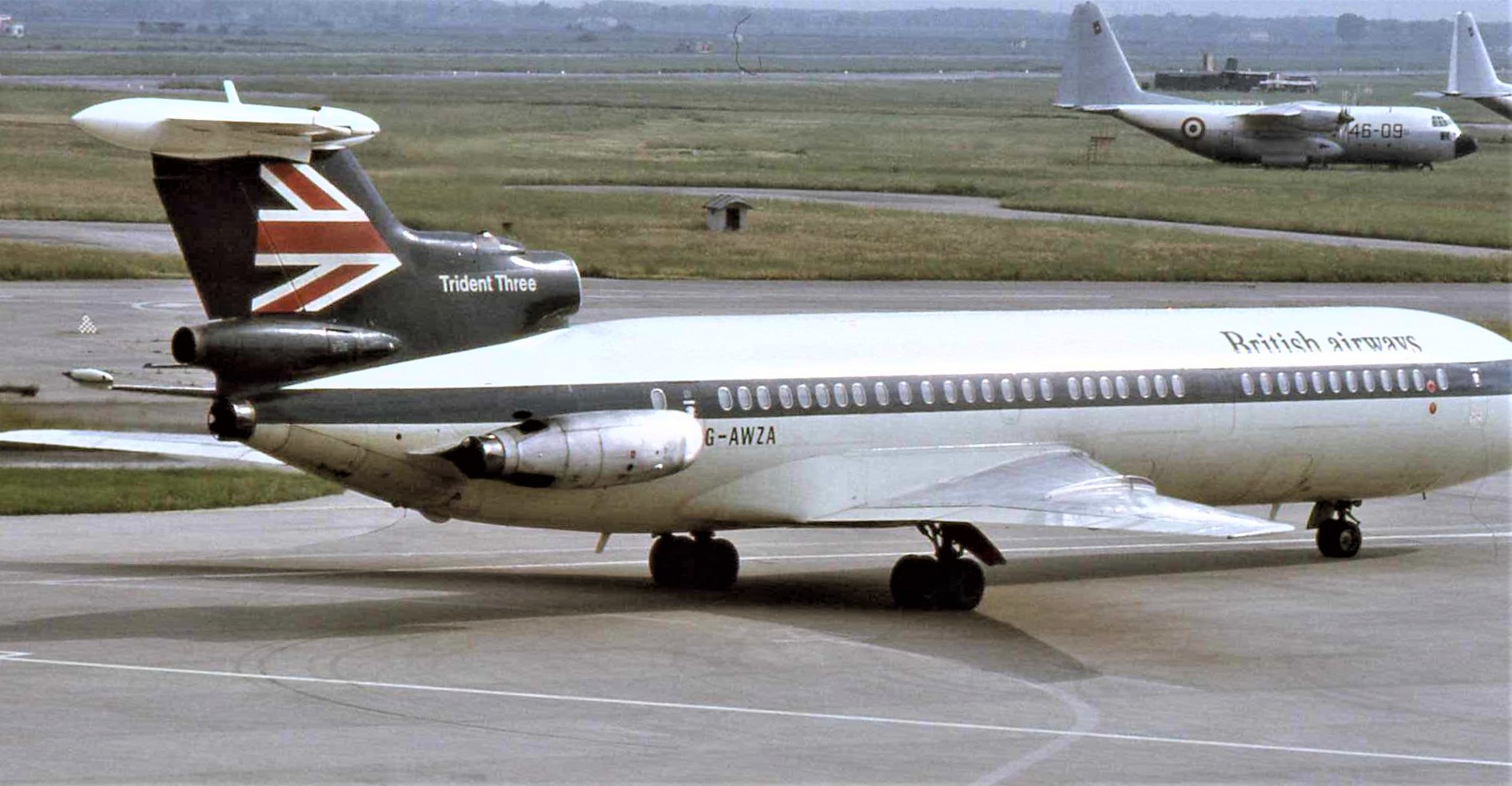
A British Airways Hawker Siddeley Trident in BEA-BA crossover livery.

The newly formed British Airways had inherited a mix of aircraft from its predecessors. It quickly retired the Standard VC10s that had come from BOAC and the last Vickers Vanguards from BEA. It also ordered the Hawker Siddeley 748 for use on Scottish routes to enable the Vickers Viscount to be retired. The first Lockheed L-1011 TriStar was delivered in October 1974, and introduced in January 1975; more TriStars were ordered in following years. The management of British Airways resisted political pressure to purchase the new Airbus A300, stating that it had no requirement for the aircraft; this rejection complicated Britain's integration into the European Union. Instead, the company planned to acquire American-made planes such as the Boeing 757; in 1976 the British government approved the purchase of multiple Boeing 737 aircraft. An innovation on 12 January 1975 was the British Airways Shuttle service from Heathrow to Glasgow (and later Edinburgh, Manchester and Belfast), which allowed a walk-on no reservation service with a "guaranteed seat" – this latter feature facilitated by backup aircraft or sometimes transfers to British Midland flights.

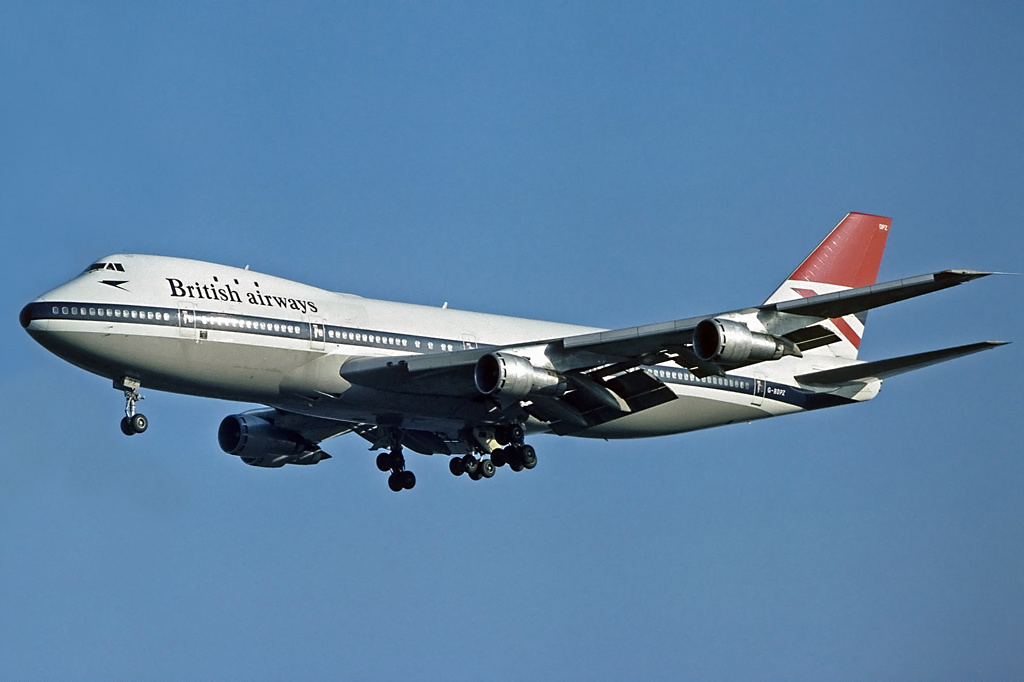
British Airways Boeing 747-100 at Heathrow Airport in 1976

The Secretary of State for Trade, Peter Shore, reviewed the Government's aviation policy and in 1976 announced a "spheres of influence" policy that ended dual designation for British airlines on all long-haul routes. British Airways and British Caledonian, the second-biggest airline in Britain, were no longer permitted to run competing scheduled flights on long-haul routes. British Caledonian had to withdraw from East Africa and from the London-New York and London-Los Angeles routes in favour of BA. In return, British Caledonian became the sole British flag carrier to the entire South American mainland, taking over routes formerly served by British Airways to Colombia, Peru and Venezuela.

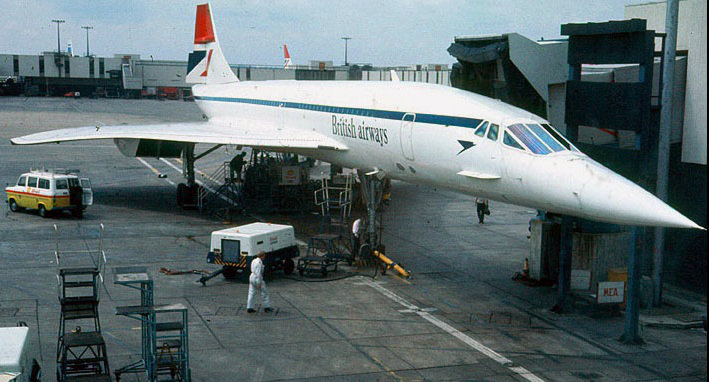
British Airways Concorde at Heathrow Airport in 1980

In 1976, British Airways commenced flying Concorde, making it one of two airlines to own and operate the supersonic Aerospatiale-BAC airliner. Simultaneously with Air France, BA inaugurated the world's first supersonic passenger service on 21 January, a daily service between Heathrow and New York becoming one of the airline's hallmarks. Initially, Concorde was a financial burden, required of the national carrier by the government, and it attracted criticism from the press as a white elephant. Several significant destinations suggested for Concorde, such as Tokyo, Japan, and Sydney, Australia never emerged as viable in reality.

In 1981, Sir John King, later Lord King, was appointed Chairman of British Airways with the mission of preparing the airline for privatisation. King recognised the prestige that Concorde brought to the airline, purchased them outright from the government, and was turning a profit within a year. According to British Airways' management the aircraft broke even on flights holding around 40–45% of passenger capacity; in 1985 the average passenger capacity in use per flight was at 65%. BA used Concorde to win business customers, guaranteeing a certain number of Concorde upgrades in return for corporate accounts with the airline—a key factor in winning business from transatlantic competitors. Although the carrier did not disclose specific numbers, media reports estimated that the Heathrow to New York service made an annual £20 million operating profit by the early 2000s (decade).

== 1980s: Privatisation ==
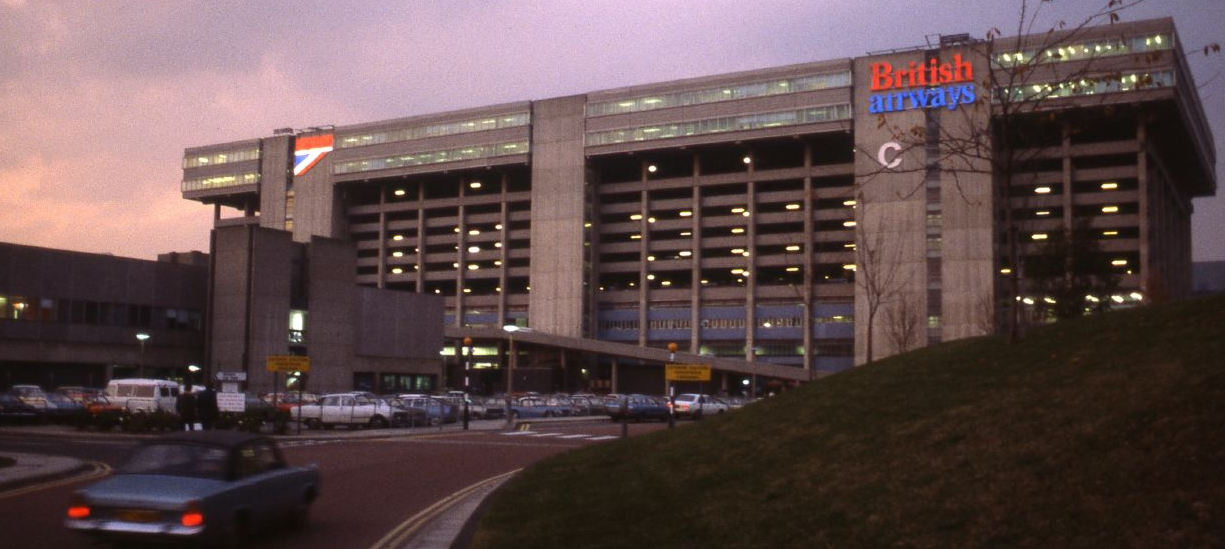
British Airways main office at Heathrow Airport in the 1980s

As British Airways headed towards privatisation, Sir John King hired Colin Marshall as CEO in 1983. King was credited with transforming the loss-making giant into one of the most profitable air carriers in the world, boldly claiming to be "The World's Favourite Airline", while many other large airlines struggled. The airline's fleet and route map were overhauled in the early years of King's tenure, with brand and advertising experts being recruited to change the airline's image. Over 23,000 jobs were shed in the early 1980s, though King managed the considerable trick of boosting staff morale and modernising operations at the same time. Offering generous inducements for staff to leave led to record losses of £545 million, to the cost of taxpayers but to the benefit of the future privatised company.

At Marshall's direction, the airline consolidated most of its long-haul operations in 1986, including Concorde services, at the newly constructed Heathrow Terminal 4. Terminal 4 would remain as BA's hub at Heathrow Airport for the next 22 years. Due in part to a recession and rising fuel prices, aircraft such as the Hawker Siddeley Trident, Vickers Super VC10 and Boeing 707 were quickly phased out of service, and planes such as the Boeing 737 were acquired in their place. In an effort to increase the use of the operational Concorde fleet, King allowed the planes to be chartered for special services. Concorde services to Singapore in cooperation with Singapore Airlines began, in addition to a service to Miami by 1984. In the 1980s, British Airways regarded Concorde as its flagship, both prestigious and profitable.

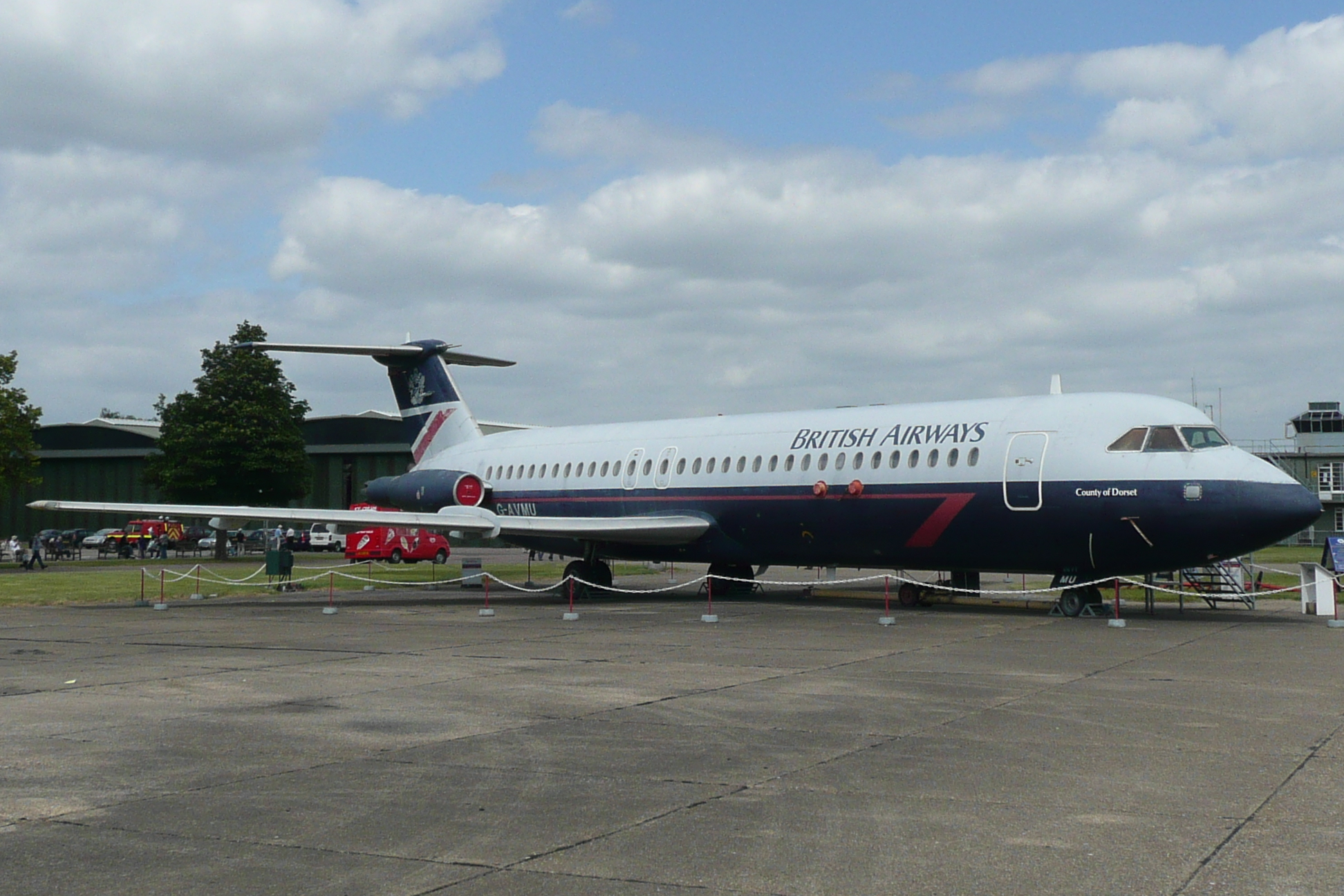
British Airways BAC One-Eleven in Landor livery at the Imperial War Museum Duxford

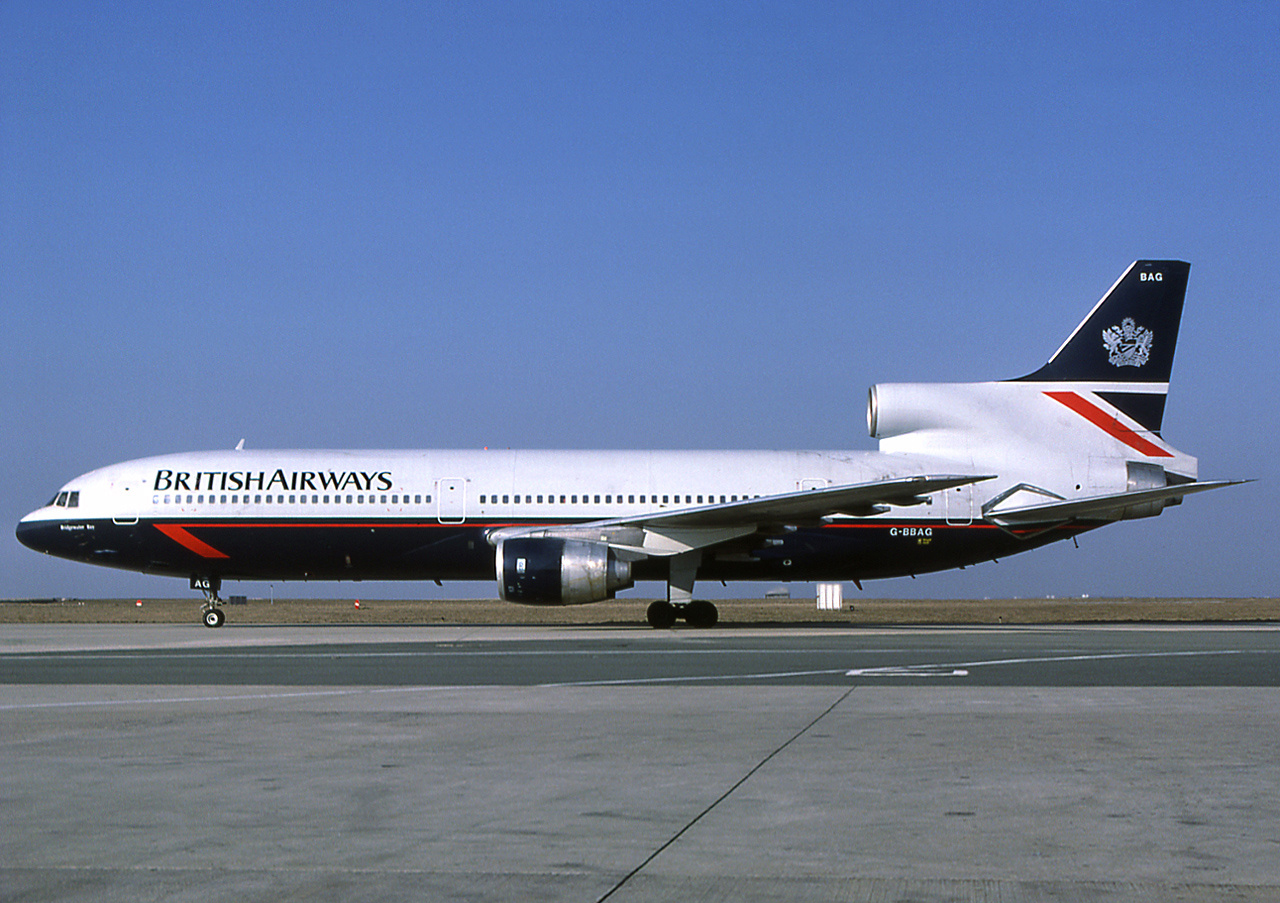
British Airways L-1011 TriStar in 1984–1997 Landor livery in 1986

The flag carrier was privatised and floated on the London Stock Exchange in February 1987 by the Thatcher government, the initial share offering was nine times oversubscribed. The privatisation of British Airways was regarded as very successful by industry observers, perhaps the most successful of a series of companies divested by the state in this era. Four months later, in July 1987, BA announced the controversial takeover of Britain's "second" airline, British Caledonian. The acquisition led to concerns regarding competition; within the industry it was widely acknowledged as a mutually agreed rescue deal to avoid the latter's collapse. The Caledonian name was kept alive, the charter subsidiary British Airtours being rebranded as Caledonian Airways. In 1992, BA absorbed Gatwick-based British carrier Dan-Air.

Soon after British Airways' privatisation, Richard Branson's Virgin Atlantic began to emerge as a competitor on some of BA's most lucrative routes. Following Virgin's highly publicised mercy mission to Iraq to fly home hostages of Saddam Hussein in 1991, King is reported to have told Marshall and his PA Director David Burnside to "do something about Branson". This began the campaign of "dirty tricks" that ended in Branson suing King and British Airways for libel in 1992. King countersued Branson and the case went to trial in 1993. British Airways, faced with likely defeat, settled the case, giving £500,000 to Branson and a further £110,000 to his airline; furthermore, BA was to pay the legal fees of up to £3 million. Branson divided the compensation among his staff, the so-called "BA bonus". British Airways and Virgin Atlantic continued to be noticeably bitter and active rivals for many years afterwards.

== 1990s: Changes, subsidiaries and growth ==
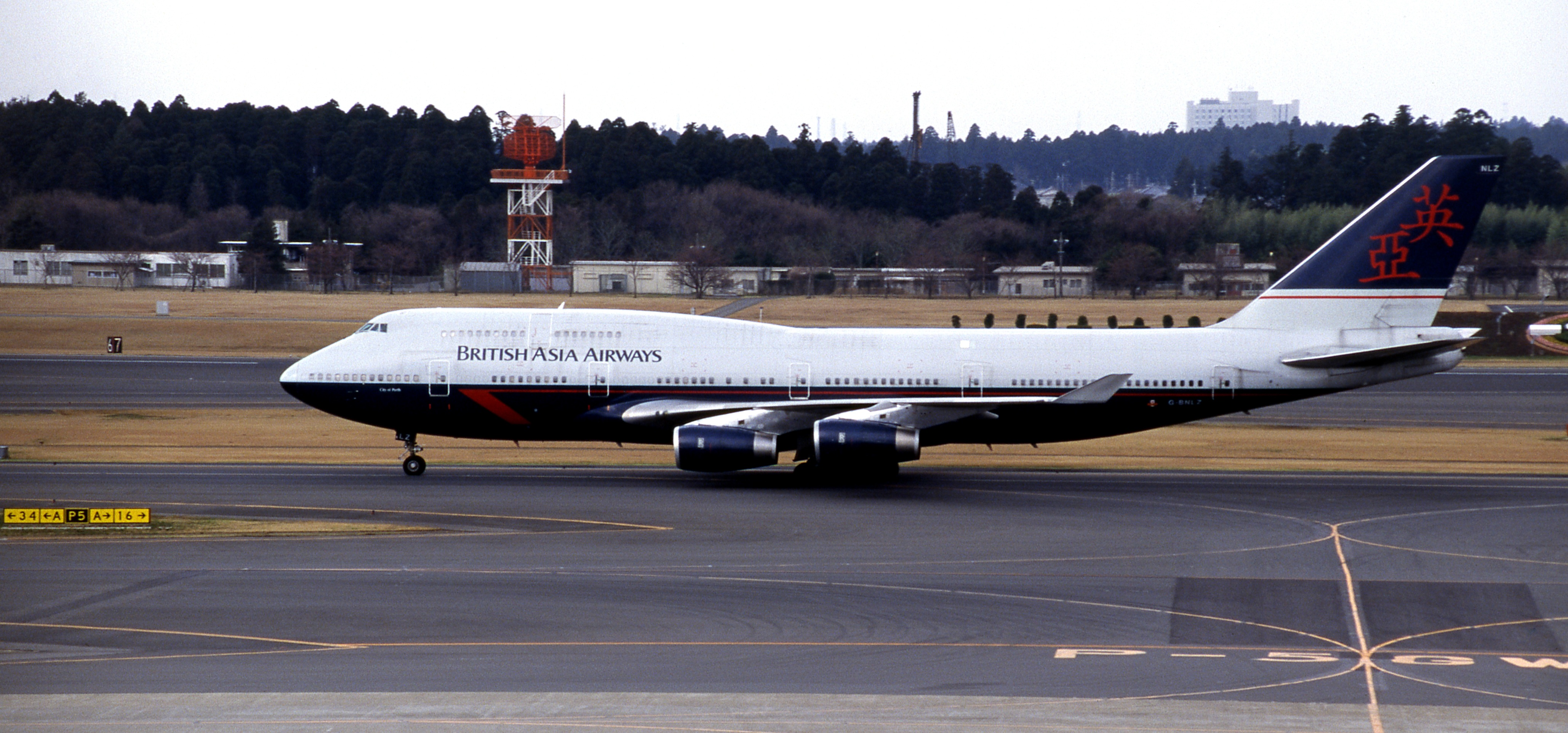
British Asia Airways Boeing 747-400 in Landor livery variant at Narita International Airport in the 1990s

During the 1990s, British Airways became the world's most profitable airline under the slogan "The World's Favourite Airline". In 1992, it bought the small German domestic airline Delta Air Transport and renamed it Deutsche BA. By the time it was sold in June 2003, Deutsche BA was operating 16 Boeing 737s and had 800 staff. British Airways also entered the French market in 1994 by purchasing a 49.9% stake in TAT European Airlines, and 70% of Air Liberté in 1997, seeking to challenge the dominance of Air France.

1993 was a highly significant year of expansion and change for British Airways, as it purchased a 25% stake in Australian airline Qantas, a 24% stake in American airline USAir, and wholly acquired Brymon Airways to form BA Connect. BA had planned to acquire as much as a 44% share in USAir, but backed down following a lack of approval from the US government; developing a significantly larger presence in the North American market remained a major priority of British Airways throughout the 1990s. Another crucial event in 1993 occurred as BA formed British Asia Airways, a subsidiary based in the Republic of China (Taiwan), to operate between London and Taipei. Owing to political sensitivities, British Asia Airways had not only a different name but also a different livery, the Union Flag tailfin being replaced by the Chinese characters 英亞 (English Asia).

Perhaps the most symbolic change to British Airways in the turbulent year of 1993 came when Lord King stepped down as chairman of the company and was replaced by former deputy Colin Marshall. Bob Ayling, who later took on the role of CEO, was appointed Managing Director by Marshall. Lord King was appointed as President of British Airways, a role created specifically for him and which he retained until his death in July 2005. In 1995, British Airways began planning for its future corporate headquarters at Harmondsworth Moor, to supplant its then-headquarters at Speedbird House at Heathrow Airport.

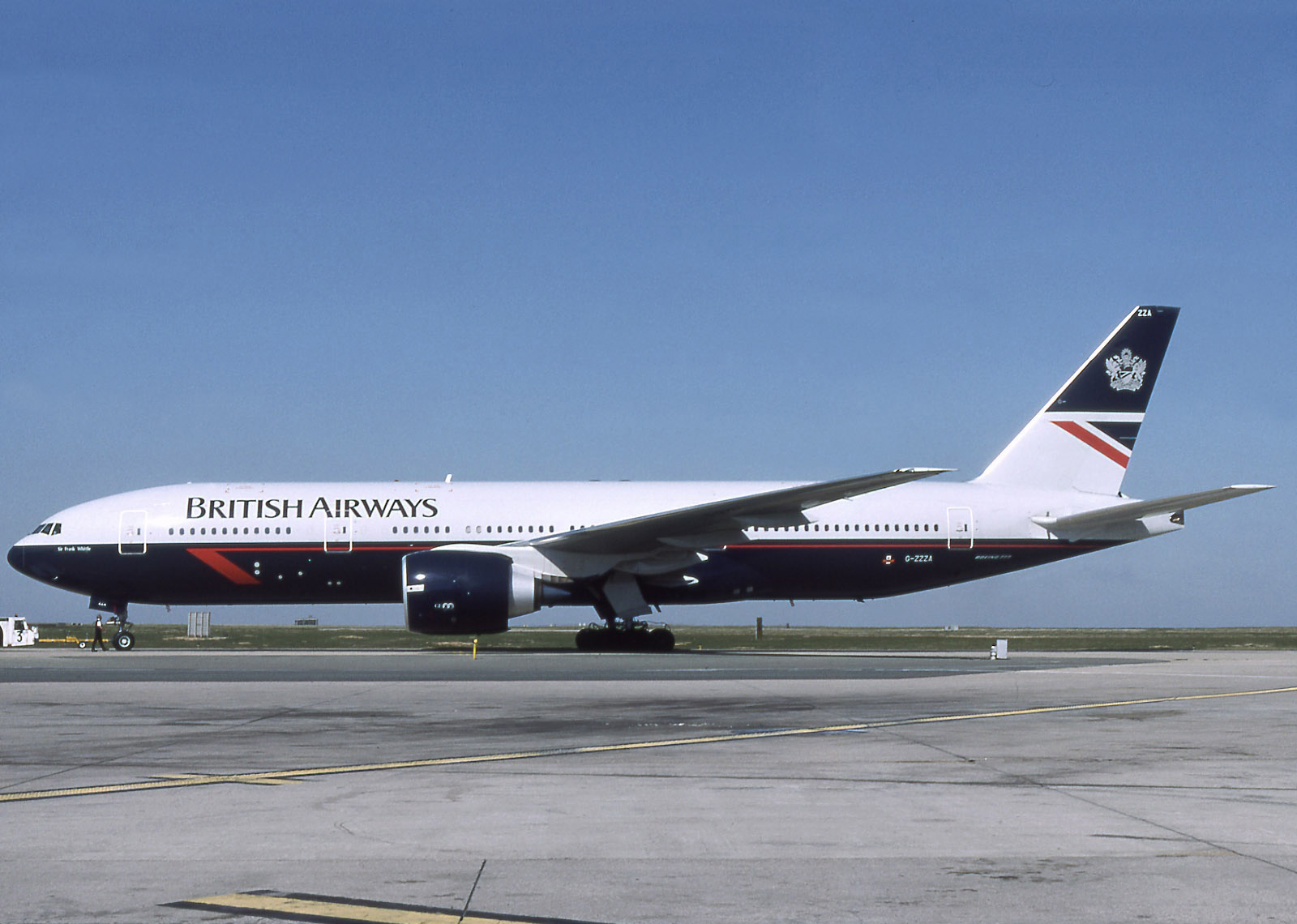
British Airways Boeing 777-200 in Landor livery in 1996

British Airways also used some of its prosperity to upgrade and replace much of its fleet. Aircraft acquisitions included the Boeing 747-400 and the Boeing 777, aimed to phase out the remaining Lockheed L-1011 TriStars and McDonnell Douglas DC-10s. Six of the disposed TriStars ended up seeing service as aerial refuelling tankers in the Royal Air Force. Another acquisition was BA's first purchase from Airbus of A320 aircraft.

In 1995, British Airways signed a franchise agreement with GB Airways, the airline at the time had been operating flights to holiday destinations for a number of years from Gatwick. The agreement was set to last until 2010 and the airline would operate all aircraft under the British Airways brand. By the time that GB Airways was sold to EasyJet in 2007 GB Airways had grown to operations out of Gatwick, London Heathrow, Manchester, Bristol and East Midlands Airport, the deal was worth £103.5 million. The franchise agreement ended on 29 March 2008.

A new source of competition emerged during the 1990s in the form of the budget airline; new companies such as Ryanair and EasyJet emerged, rising to prominence using a no-frills and low-price approach to gain marketshare from the traditional carriers. In the wake of deregulation, these airline companies would prove to be an increasing source of competition domestically to British Airways. A small handful of short routes also came under pressure from modern high-speed rail systems, such as the Eurostar service between London, Paris, and Brussels.

== 1996: Bob Ayling era ==
In 1996, British Airways, with its newly appointed CEO Bob Ayling, entered a period of financial turbulence due to increased competition, high oil prices, and a strong pound. The airline's management clashed with trade unions over planned changes, Ayling taking a hardline stance; the resulting disruption from the confrontations cost the company hundreds of millions of pounds. With several strikes and BA's restructuring plans stalling, investors became frustrated. Over time, the company was seen as being less active and successful than its peak in 1993, causing its share value to suffer.

In 1996, relations between British Airways and USAir, in which BA held a stake then valued at $500 million, soured, despite Ayling's preference to "remain a major investor in USAir", and BA later sold its share in the company. Ayling had also pursued partnership and antitrust immunity with American Airlines, however this was unsuccessful due to the conditions placed on the deal by regulatory authorities, the most painful of which would have been the sacrifice of landing slots at Heathrow, and in part caused the breakdown of the partnership with USAir as well.

In 1997, Ayling dropped BA's traditional Union Flag tailfin livery in favour of world design tailfins, in an effort to change the airline's image to be more cosmopolitan; several members of the senior management had expressed negative opinions of nationalism within the company. This move quickly came under fire by the media for making hundreds of employees redundant while squandering money on expensive rebranding. Several influential figures, such as former Prime Minister Margaret Thatcher, spoke out against abandoning the Union Flag scheme and BA turning its back on the nation. British Airways' long-time rival, Virgin Atlantic, took advantage of BA's public relations blunder and adopted the British flag along with the slogan "Britain's national flagcarrier", recognising the value and prestige of bearing the flag. Ayling eventually declaring the fleet would sport a dual livery; half Union Flag, half the world design tailfins. On 6 June 1999, he announced that all newly delivered and overhauled BA planes would bear the Union Flag, based on a design first used on Concorde; the cosmopolitan scheme was abandoned.

We fly the British Flag, not these awful things.

— Margaret Thatcher

Benefits during Ayling's leadership included cost savings of £750 million and the establishment of the successful, but highly subsidised, Go in 1998. Go was a low-cost carrier intended to compete in the rapidly emerging "no-frills" segment. After four years of successful operations British Airways searched for a buyer for Go, eventually the airline was sold off to venture capitalists 3i and later merged with EasyJet. Ayling also sought a reduction of capacity, cancelling Boeing 747-400 orders in favour of the Boeing 777-200ER and rationalising BA's short-haul fleet with new Airbus A320 aircraft. However, BA began discussions with Airbus for the eventual procurement of the Airbus A380, a very large passenger jet. In September 1998, British Airways became a founding member of the Oneworld global airline alliance, along with American Airlines, Canadian Airlines, Cathay Pacific, and Qantas. As part of the marketing alliance, member airlines combined frequent-flyer program benefits and streamlined inter-airline connections. Waterside, the current British Airways head office, officially opened in 1998.

In late 1999 British Airways agreed to another franchise agreement with the small Dutch regional airline Base Regional Airlines. The airline operated out of Eindhoven Airport to six destinations across Europe including Hamburg, Zurich, and London Heathrow. The franchise agreement was the third to be made with an international airline since Comair and Sun Air of Scandinavia.

== 2000: Rod Eddington era ==
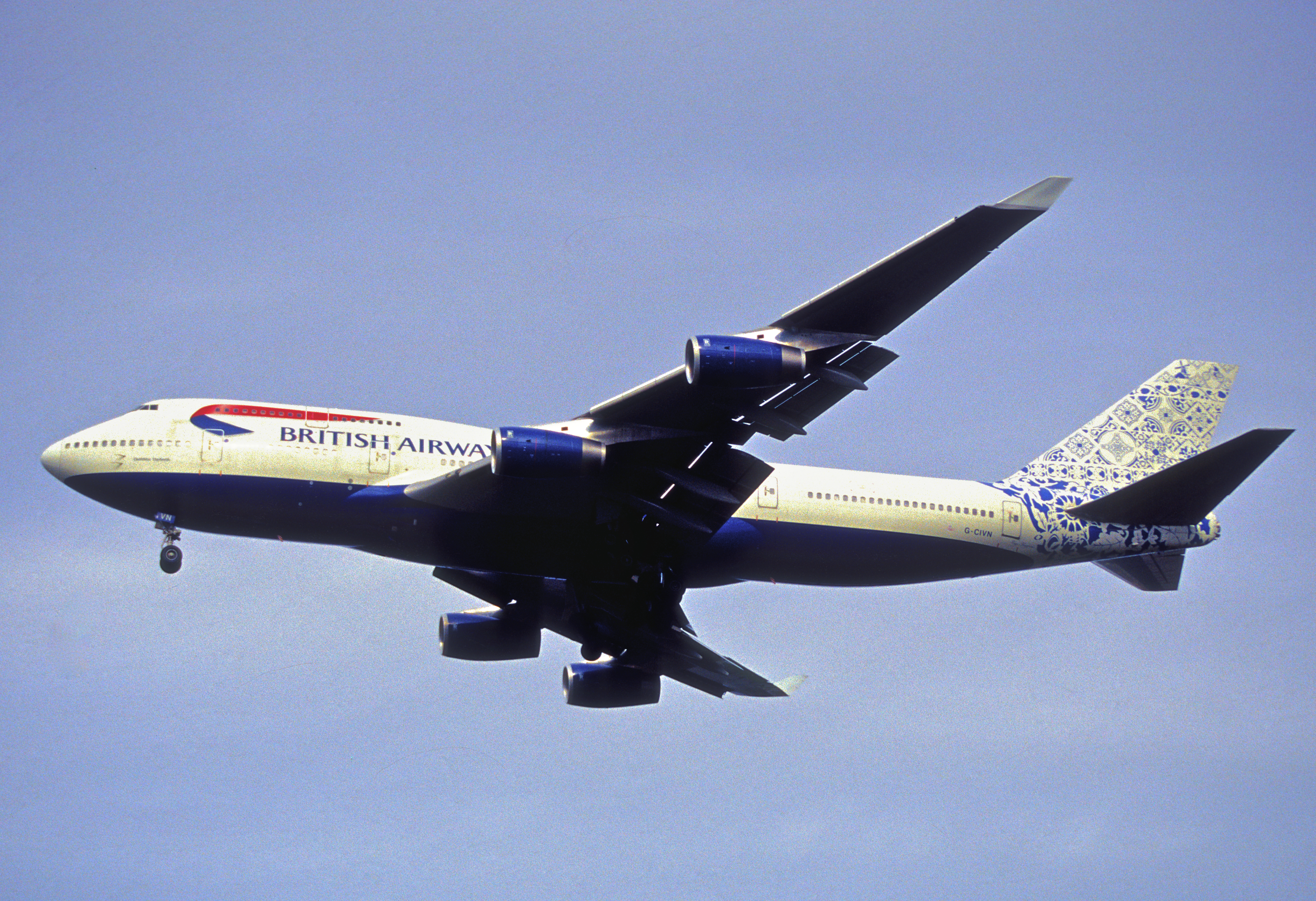
British Airways Boeing 747-400 with ethnic livery

In 1999, British Airways reported a 50% drop in profits, its worst since privatisation. This was compounded by the majority of BA subsidiary companies running at heavy losses as well; the company reacted by selling several. In March 2000, Bob Ayling was removed from his position and, in May, British Airways announced Rod Eddington as his successor. Eddington set about the termination of several investment programs, such as in Olympic Airways, and cutting the workforce, the process being taken still further in response to the slump caused by the 9/11 attacks in 2001. BA's share price dropped from 760p in May 1997 to only 150p in September 2001, showing how heavily the company had been hit.

With the crash of Air France Flight 4590 in 2000, 9/11, and escalating maintenance costs, the future of Concorde was limited, despite expensive safety modifications made after the Air France accident. It was announced on 10 April 2003 that in October that year BA would cease scheduled services with Concorde, due to depressed passenger numbers. The last commercial Concorde flight from New York to London was on 24 October 2003. The airline retained ownership of eight Concordes, which were placed on long-term loan to museums in the UK, US and Barbados.

During Eddington's leadership, there were several other fleet changes. A publicly well-received decision of Eddington's was to completely end the use of ethnic liveries on aircraft, announcing in May 2001 that all of BA's fleet would be repainted in a variant of the Union Flag design used on Concorde. All Boeing 747-200s and older Boeing 767 aircraft were retired in 2001 and 2002 in an effort to cut costs, and interest was expressed in the upcoming Boeing 7E7 and the since-cancelled Boeing Sonic Cruiser. In late 2001 the franchise agreement with Base Regional Airlines was ended after just over two years of operations, the airline had filed for bankruptcy and ceased operations.

From 2002, BA strongly marketed the full-service nature of its remaining domestic flights by the use of principal airports, and provision of complimentary food and drink. This came as a response to low-cost operators' aggressive pricing, even though its main full-service UK rival bmi later also abandoned some "frills" on its domestic network. In June 2003, the German subsidiary, Deutsche BA, was sold to investment group Intro Verwaltungsgesellschaft. On 8 September 2004, British Airways announced that it was to sell its 18.5% stake in Qantas, but would continue the alliance (such as sharing revenue), particularly on the Kangaroo Route. The £425 million raised was used to reduce the airline's debt.

Lord Marshall, who had been appointed a life peer in 1998, retired as chairman in July 2004 and was replaced by Martin Broughton, former Chairman of British American Tobacco. On 8 March 2005, Broughton announced that former Aer Lingus CEO Willie Walsh would take over from Rod Eddington upon his retirement in September 2005. Walsh pledged to retain the full-service model on its much reduced UK network as a means of distinguishing BA from the competition, and that customers were willing to pay extra for higher service levels.

== 2005: Willie Walsh era ==
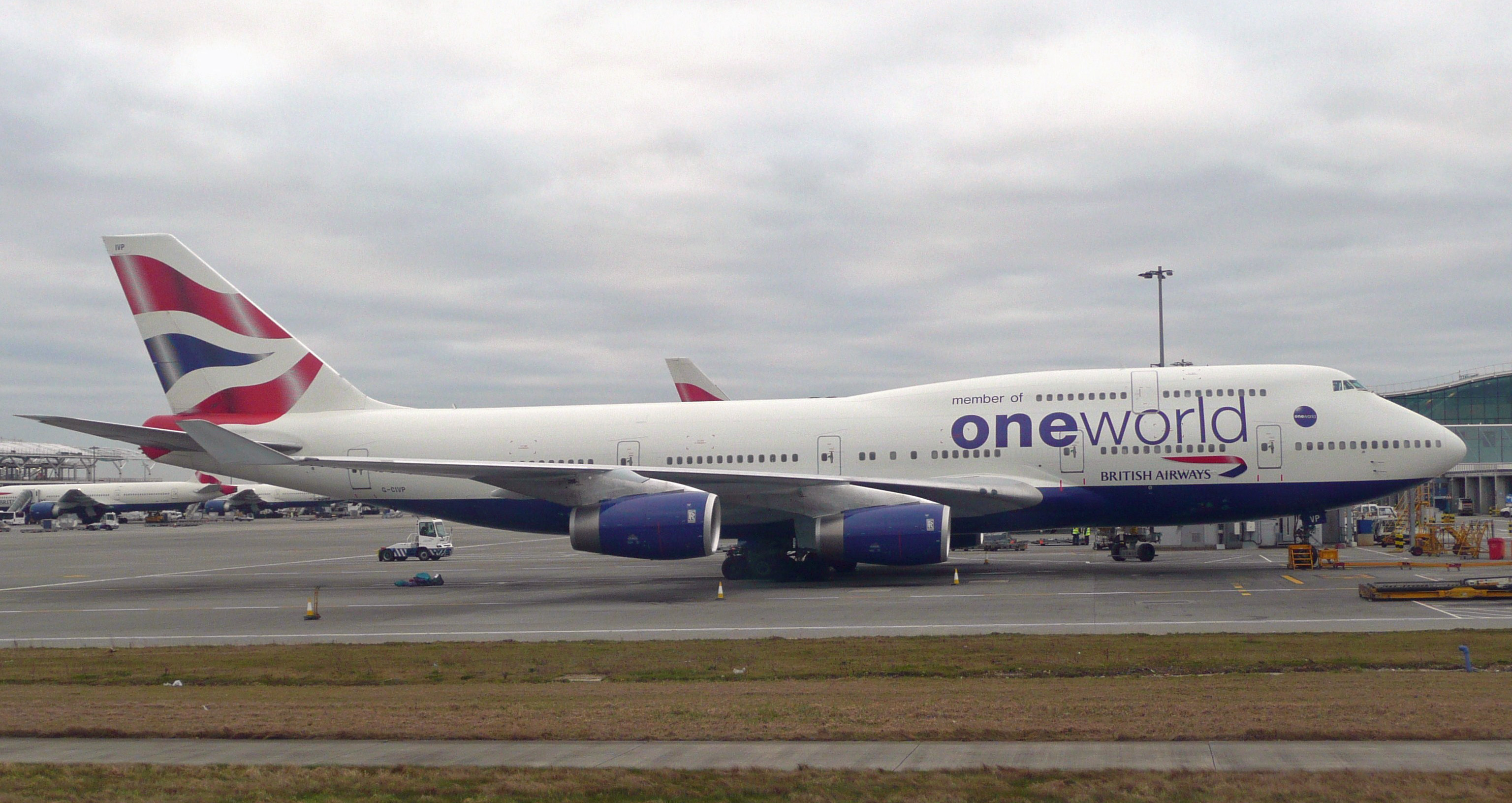
British Airways Boeing 747-400 in Oneworld livery at Heathrow Airport

In September 2005, new CEO Willie Walsh announced dramatic changes to the management of British Airways, with the aim of saving £300 million by 2008, the cost of the airline's move to its new hub at Heathrow's Terminal 5. Walsh presided over the sale of BA Connect to Flybe, stating "Despite the best efforts of the entire team at BA Connect, we do not see any prospect of profitability in its current form." BA retained a 15% stake in Flybe following the sale.

In June 2006, the Office of Fair Trading (OFT) and the United States Department of Justice (DOJ) began investigating allegations that BA was price-fixing fuel surcharges on long haul flights. The allegations first came to light when Virgin Atlantic reported the events to the authorities after it found staff members from BA and Virgin Atlantic were colluding. Virgin Atlantic was later granted immunity by both the OFT and DOJ. The price-fixing probe led to the resignation of commercial director Martin George and communications chief Iain Burns.

Although I did not have any direct contact with BA in relation to passenger fuel surcharges, I regret that, on becoming aware of the discussions, I did not take steps to stop them.

— Steve Ridgway, CEO of Virgin Atlantic

On 1 August 2007, British Airways was fined £121.5 million for price-fixing by the OFT, and the US DOJ subsequently announced that it would also fine British Airways US$300 million (£148 million) for price-fixing. Although BA said fuel surcharges were "a legitimate way of recovering costs", in May 2007 it had put aside £350 million for legal fees and fines. In July 2009 Steve Ridgway, the CEO of Virgin Atlantic, admitted he knew about the illegal price-fixing at his airline and did nothing to stop it.

In January 2008, BA unveiled its new subsidiary OpenSkies which took advantage of the liberalisation of transatlantic traffic rights, flying non-stop between major European cities and the United States. Operations between Paris and New York began with a single Boeing 757 in June 2008. On 2 July 2008 British Airways announced that it had agreed to buy French airline L'Avion for £54 million. L'Avion was fully integrated with OpenSkies in 2009.

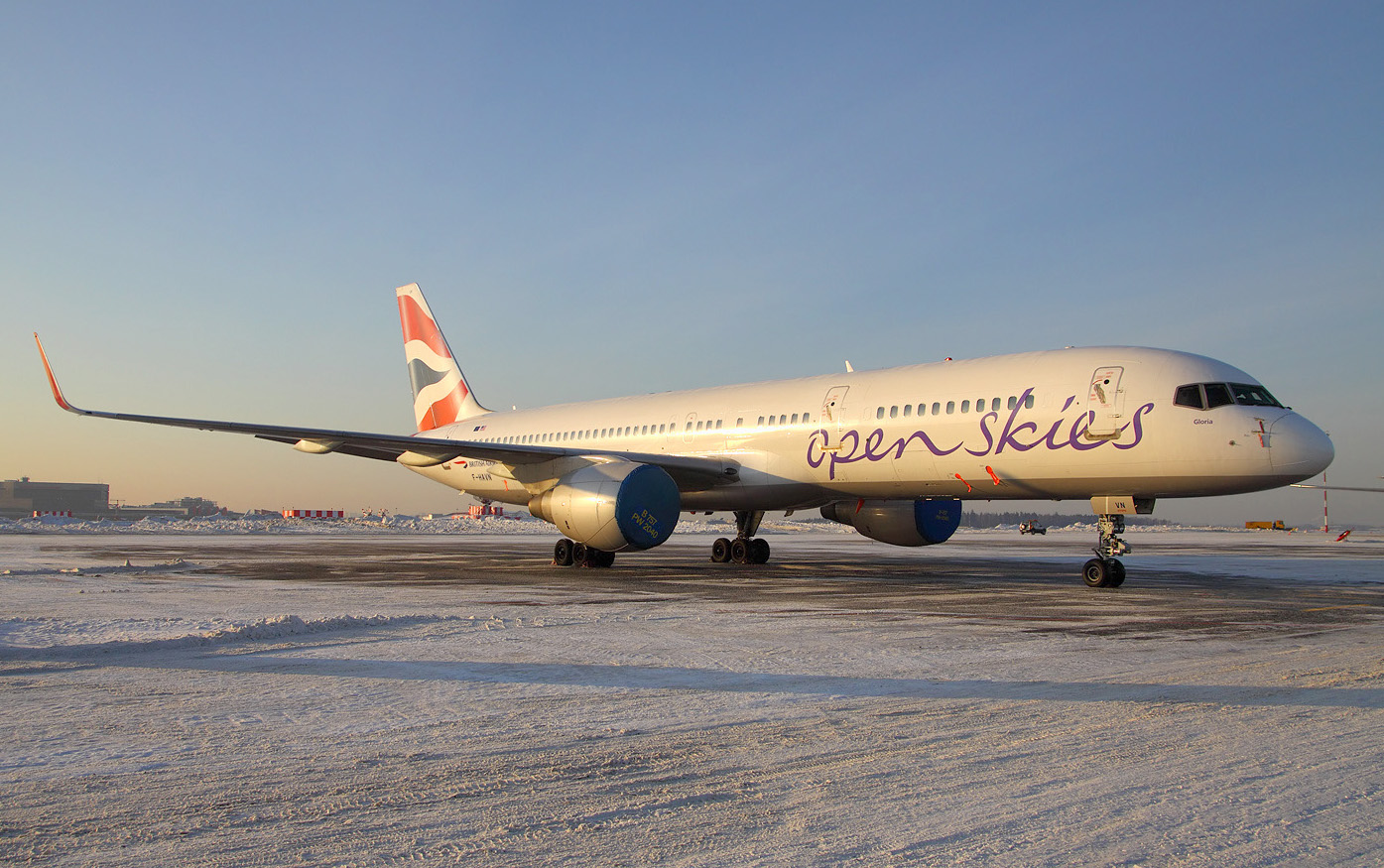
OpenSkies Boeing 757-200 at Sheremetyevo International Airport

On 14 March 2008 Heathrow Terminal 5, built exclusively for the use of British Airways at a cost of £4.3 billion, was officially opened by Queen Elizabeth II. Upon opening to passengers on 27 March 2008 serious problems immediately arose, many from staff confusion. The baggage handling system failed completely, resulting in seven flights departing with no baggage loaded. In the first five days, a backlog of 28,000 bags built up and over 300 flights were cancelled. Walsh commented that it "was not our finest hour ... the buck stops with me". Two directors left BA in April 2008 over the troubled transition to Terminal 5. Walsh also declined his annual bonus over Terminal 5, despite record profits overall. By October 2008 Terminal 5 operations has settled and further long-haul flights were transferred over.

== 2009: Financial difficulties, disruptions and merger ==
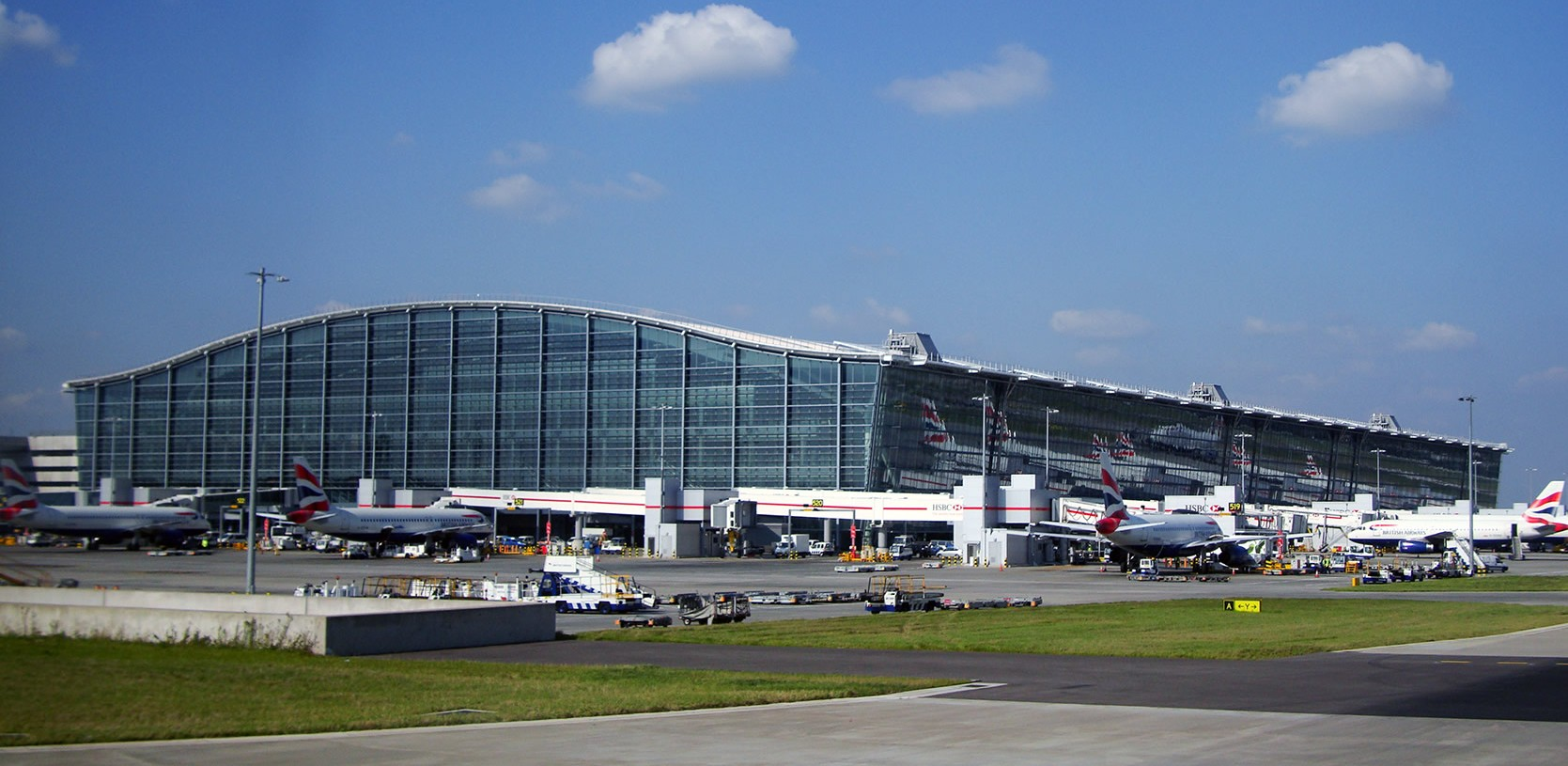
Since 2008, most British Airways operations have been based at Heathrow Terminal 5

On 30 July 2008, British Airways and Iberia Airlines announced a merger plan that would result in the two airlines joining forces in an all-stock transaction. The two airlines would retain their separate brands similar to KLM and Air France in their merger agreement. In the beginning of August 2008, American Airlines announced an alliance with BA and Iberia, allowing the two carriers to fix fares, routes, and schedules together. In addition to merger talks with Iberia, it was announced on 2 December 2008 that British Airways was discussing a merger with Qantas. If British Airways, Iberia and Qantas were to combine as one company it would be the largest airline in the world. However, on 18 December 2008, the talks with Qantas ended due to issues over ownership. In November 2010, BA was fined €104 million by the European Commission following an investigation into price-fixing.

Aviation remains in recession ... We were quick to respond to the crisis by taking out excess capacity and, at the same time, driving down unit costs by 5.2 per cent ... With revenue likely to be £1 billion lower this year, we can't stand still and further cost reduction is essential.

— Willie Walsh, CEO of British Airways

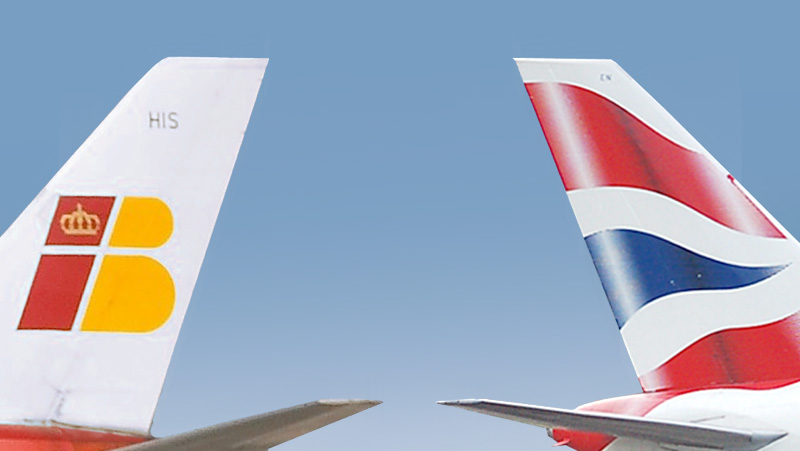
British Airways and Iberia announced their merger in April 2010, creating the International Airlines Group

In June 2009, British Airways contacted some 30,000 employees in the United Kingdom, including Walsh, asking them to work without pay over a period of between one week and one month to save money. On 6 November 2009 the worst ever half-year loss in British Airways' history was reported to the public. A High Court decision sided with BA against union opposition to restructuring plans, including a reduction in cabin crew in November 2009. On 14 December 2009 cabin crew at British Airways voted in favour of strike action over the Christmas period over job cuts and contract changes. On 17 December the ballot was ruled invalid by the High Court due to voting irregularities, thus the strike did not take place. On 6 March 2010 Unite announced further strike action. More than 80 planes were grounded at Heathrow Airport on the first day; however, British Airways officials stated that 65% of flights were undisturbed.

On 8 April 2010, it was confirmed British Airways and Iberia Airlines had agreed to merge, making the combined commercial airline the third largest in the world by revenue. The newly merged company is known as International Airlines Group, both airlines continue to operate under their current brands. The merger is believed to be worth approximately £5 billion, the new group has over 400 aircraft and flies to over 200 destinations across the world. As part of the deal, British Airways shareholders took a 55% stake in the company, headquartered in London, with the remainder owned by Iberia. Industry analysts have speculated that the merger makes a three-way tie-in with American Airlines more likely.

Across April and May 2010, much of Western and Northern Europe had their airspace closed due to huge density ash clouds from the erupting Eyjafjallajökull volcano in Iceland. It was feared that aircraft could be damaged or could even crash due to engine ingestion of volcanic ash, as had famously troubled British Airways Flight 9 in 1982. This affected all airlines operating within British airspace, leading to strong objections from companies such as Ryanair. Flights progressively restarted as the ash levels declined.

On 4 October 2010, to celebrate the Boeing 757 fleet's retirement after 27 years, British Airways unveiled one of the 757s (G-CPET) in a "retro" Negus & Negus livery. This aircraft conducted its last passenger flight on 6 November 2010, the proceeds of which went to the charity Flying Start the charity partnership between British Airways and Comic Relief.

In May 2017, BA's entire fleet was grounded for two days, due to a failure of their IT system, which the company believed to be caused by too many cutbacks in the company. In response to the COVID-19 pandemic, in July 2020 BA announced it planned to make 12,000 staff redundant. It also brought forward the retirement of its 31 Boeing 747-400s, with all retired with immediate effect.

== Liveries and logos ==
=== Hybrid/transition liveries ===
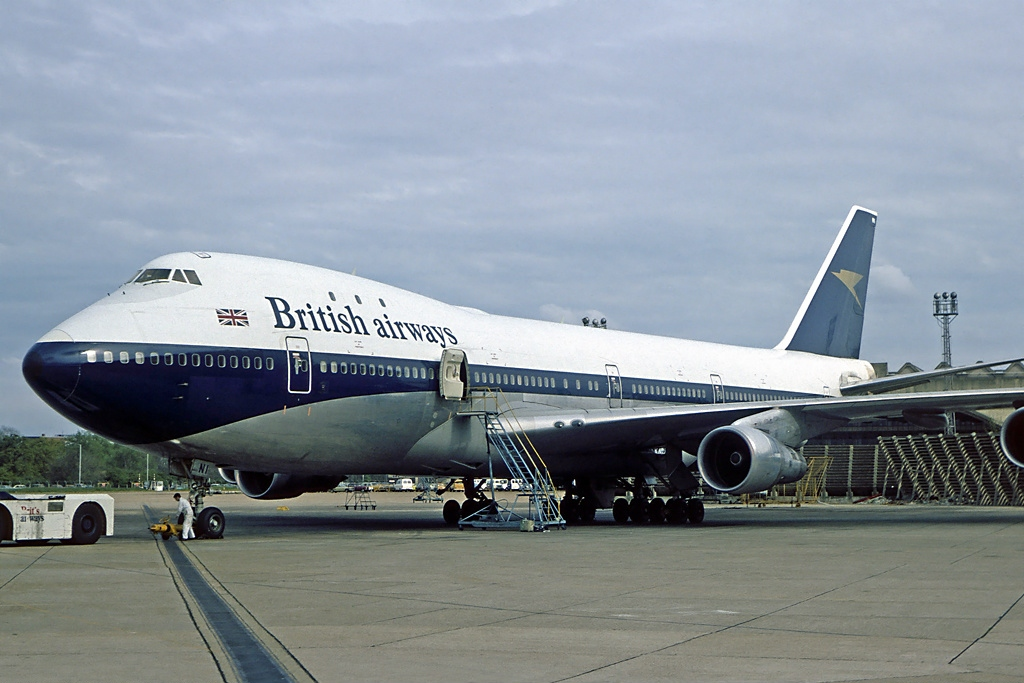
ex-BOAC Boeing 747 with "British airways" branding and Speedbird tail

ex-BEA Vickers Vanguard with "British airways" branding and Speedjack tail

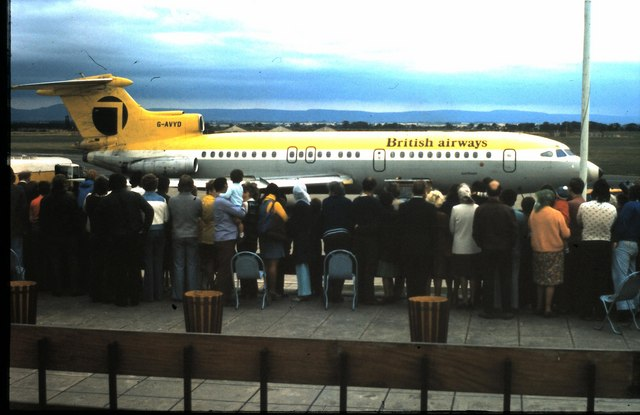
ex-Northeast Hawker Trident with "British airways" branding and Norjet tail.

The aeroplanes that British Airways inherited from the four-way merger between BOAC, BEA, Cambrian, and Northeast were initially given a livery nicknamed 'hybrid' or 'transition', using the text "British airways" (stylised with a lowercase "a" in Airways) to replace the original wordmark, but otherwise keeping the predecessor airline's livery. For instance, ex-BOAC aircraft retained the dark blue, grey, and white colour scheme with the golden Speedbird on the tail.

=== Negus livery and Speedbird ===
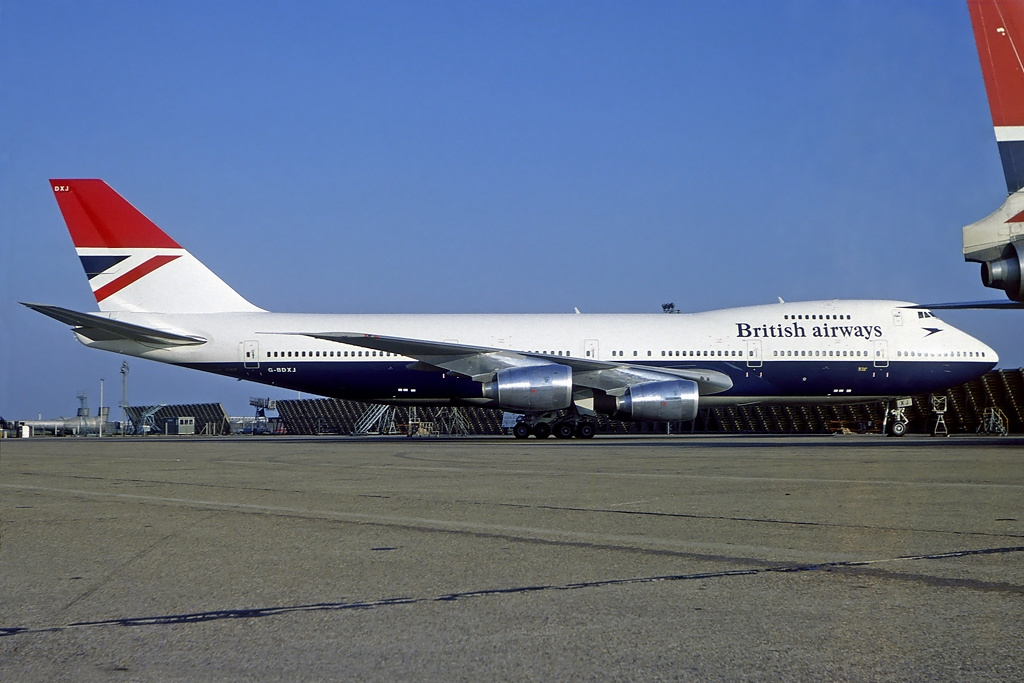
747 in "Negus" livery (photo from 1980, livery used 1974–1985)

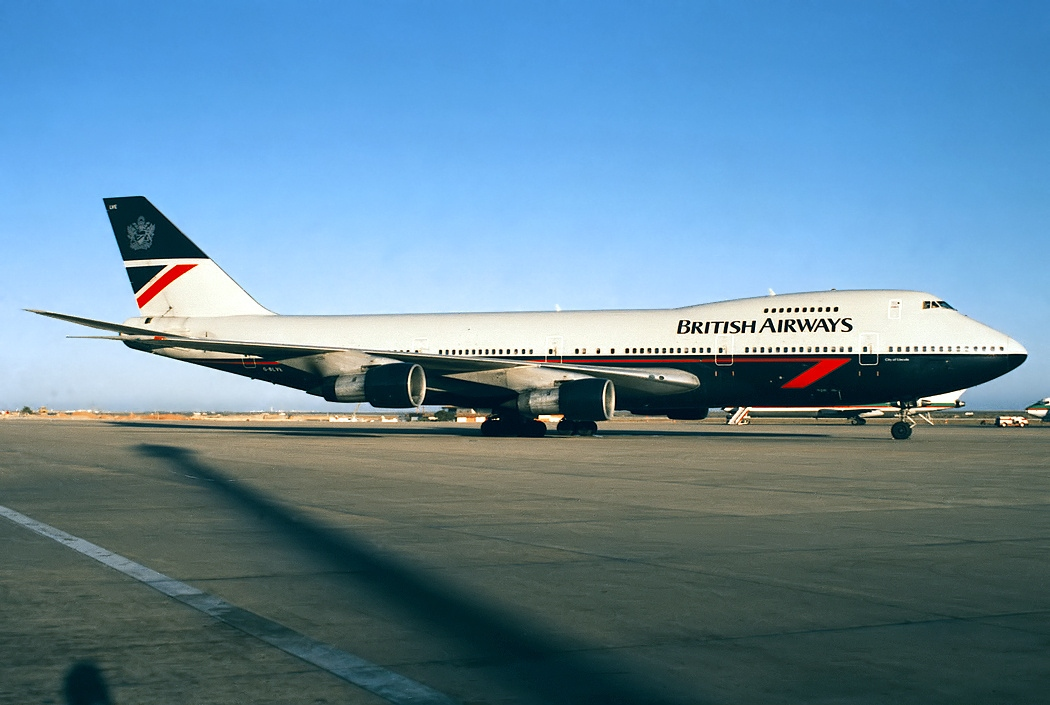
747 in "Landor" livery (photo from 1988, livery used 1984–2002)

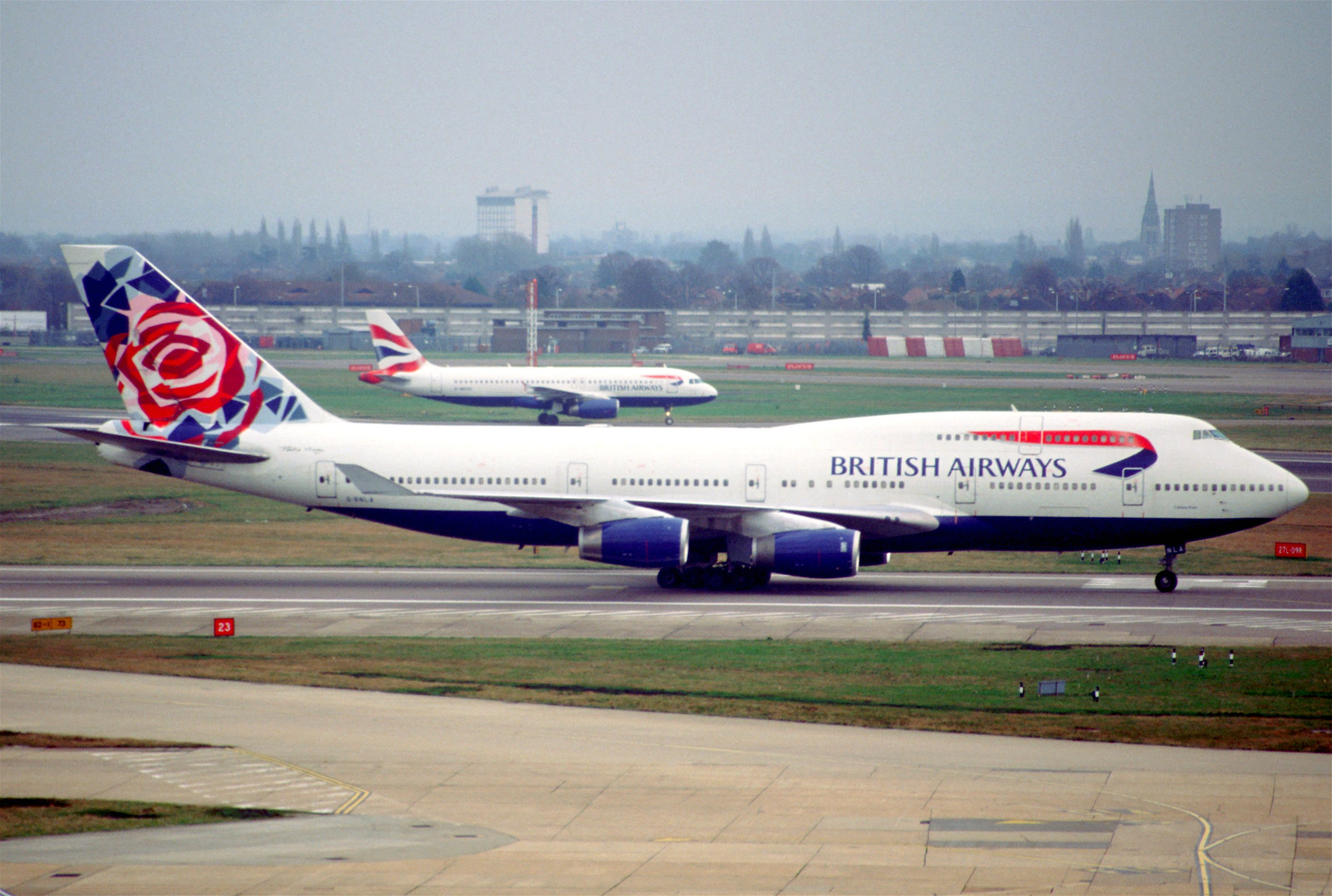
747 in "Utopia" livery and Chelsea Rose tail art (photo from 2002, livery used 1997–2006)

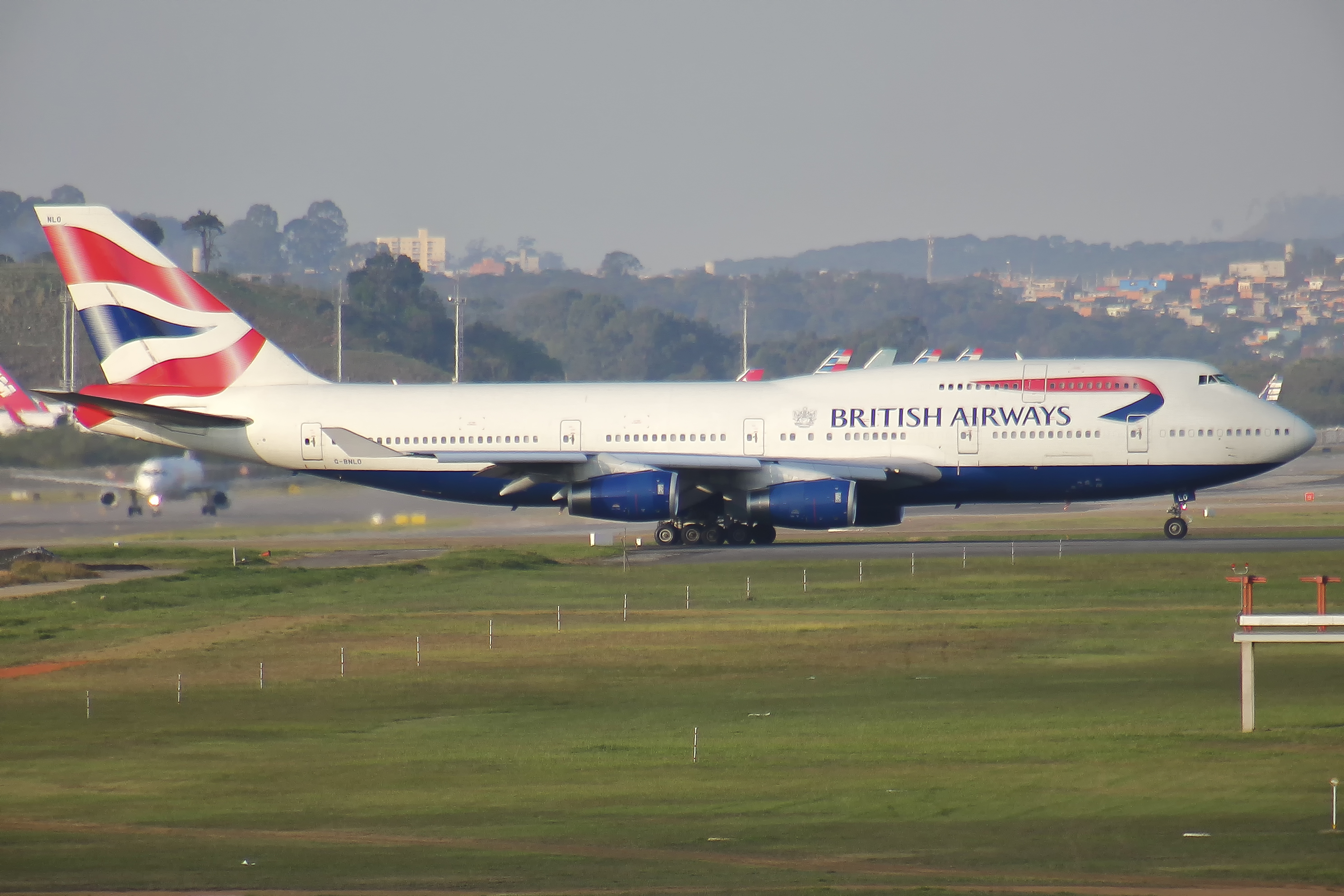
747 in "Utopia" and Chatham Dockyard Union Flag tail art (photo from 2015, livery used 2001–present)

With its formation in 1974, British Airways' aeroplanes were given a new white, blue, and red colour scheme with a cropped Union Jack painted on their tail fins, designed by Negus & Negus. British Airways selected the Negus & Negus design over competing entries from Lippincott & Margulies and Henrion. The "Negus" livery was phased in over a three-year period. It also adopted a blue version of the Speedbird logo from BOAC, moved to the nose of the planes, at the request of ex-BOAC staff. The contract for British Airways was then the largest corporate identity branding commission in Europe. David Nicolson, the chair of British Airways, said it would present "a modern, efficient, confident and friendly face to the public".

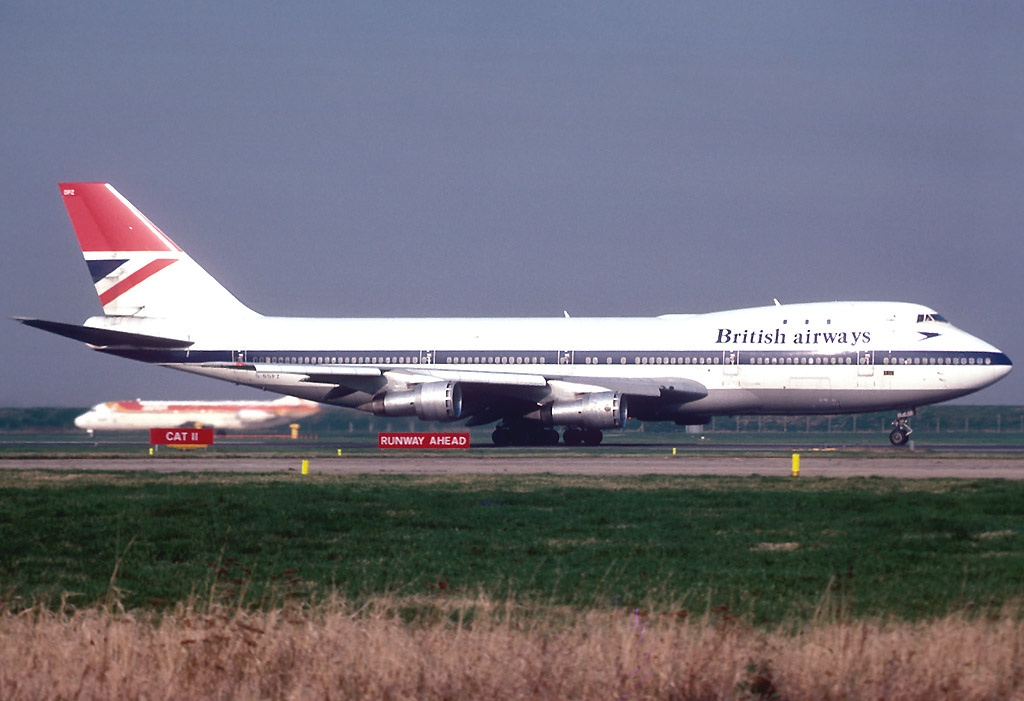
Boeing 747 in hybrid Negus/Aer Lingus livery (1981)

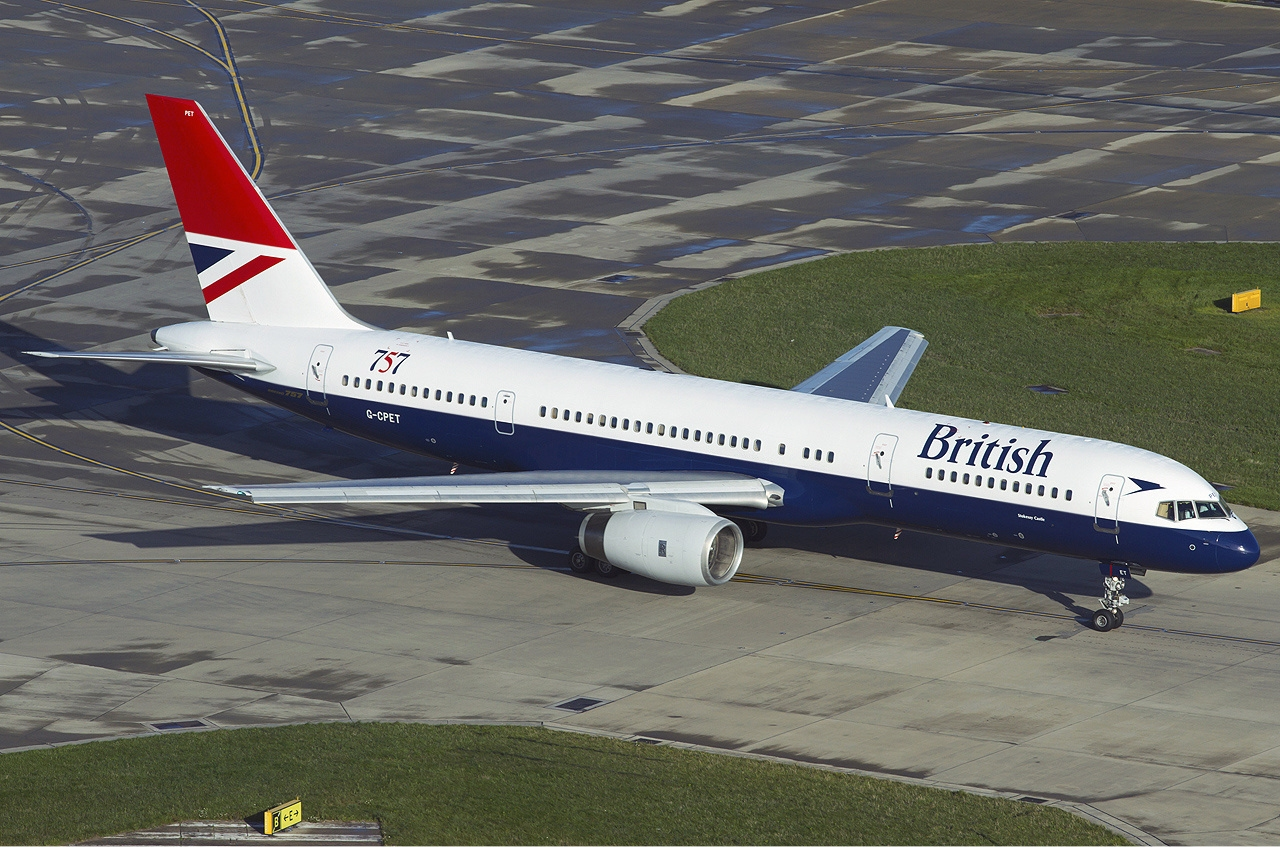
Boeing 757 in "retrojet" Negus livery (2010)

A Boeing 747 (EI-ASJ/G-BDPZ), originally delivered to Aer Lingus, was leased by British Airways in 1976 and partially repainted in "Negus" livery above the passenger windows, retaining Aer Lingus livery on the cheatline and belly. Shortly after 1974, Negus & Negus convinced BA to drop "airways" from the wordmark and the aircraft were painted with just the word "British" for approximately a decade. One Boeing 757 (G-CPET) was returned to "Negus" livery with the abbreviated "British" wordmark in October 2010, just ahead of the retirement of the 757 fleet at the end of that month.

=== Landor livery and Speedwing ===
In 1984, a new livery designed by Landor Associates updated the airline's look as it prepared for privatisation. The Speedbird was changed to a red Speedwing arrow logo carried at the cheatline, just below the passenger windows, along the length of the fuselage. The "A" in Airways was now capitalised. The company's crest was added to the tailfin, along with the motto "To Fly To Serve"; that specific element received criticism from domestic designers. June Fraser, president of the Chartered Society of Designers, wrote to The Times in protest, stating that "a barely distinguishable heraldic device perched incongruously above the remnants of the earlier instantly recognizable and appropriate solution" was an alarming development.

A consonant look was applied to the Concorde, omitting the subsonic livery's blue belly. As with the prior Negus livery modified for the Concorde, the heat generated by supersonic flight required the fuselage to be painted in white. The Landor effort took eighteen months to complete at a cost of over US$1 million. The new branding was intended to demonstrate "professionalism and precision" while being "simple, distinctive, and dignified".

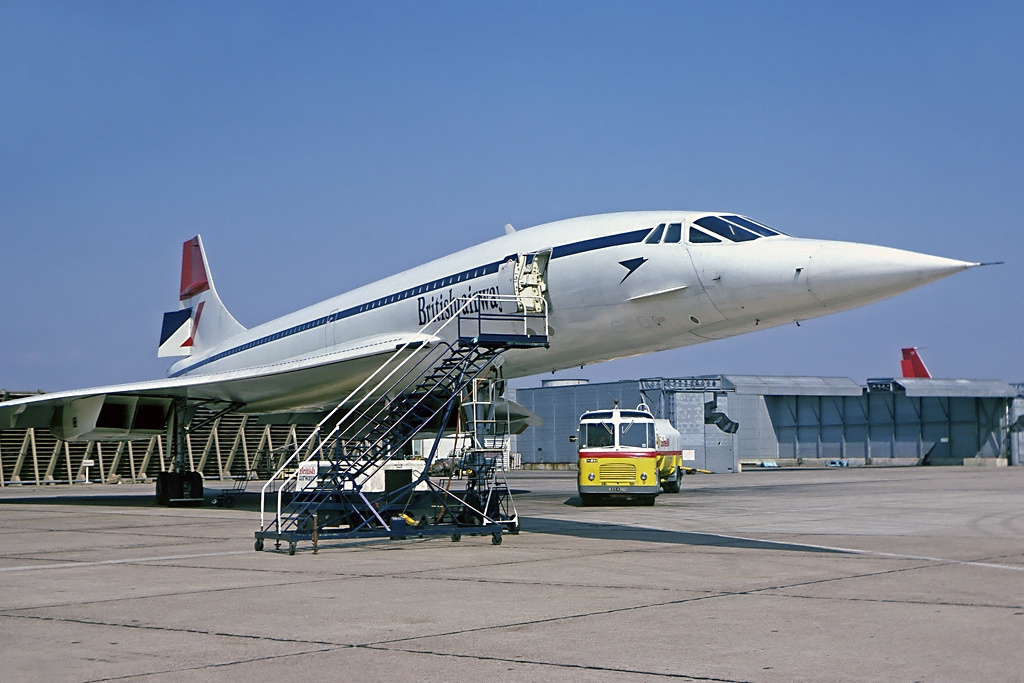
Concorde in "Negus" livery, blue Speedbird logo

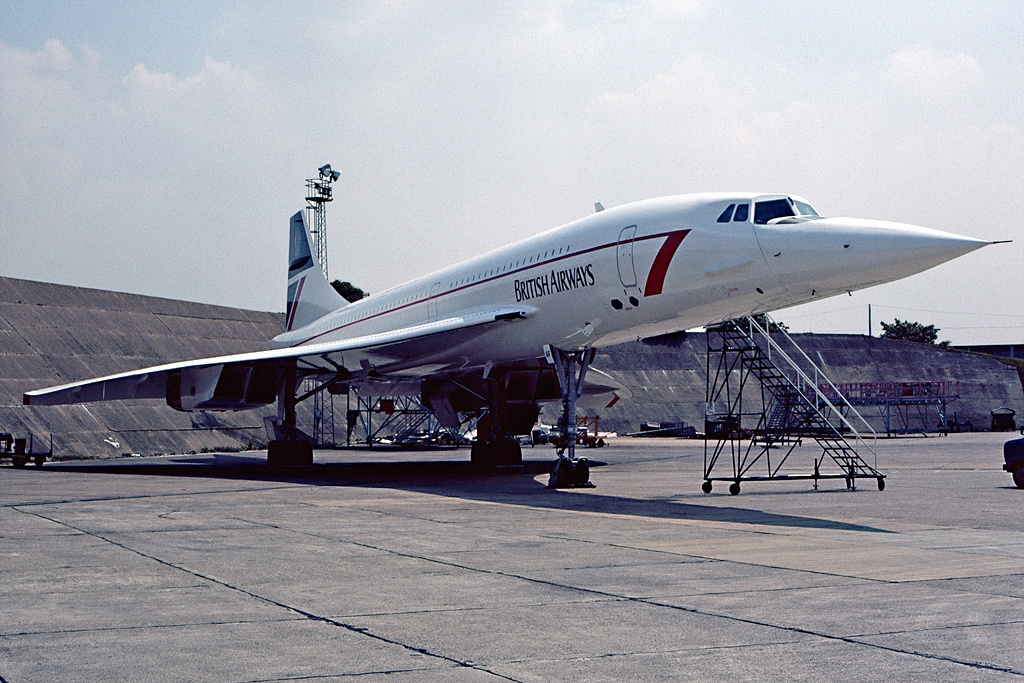
Concorde in "Landor" livery, red Speedwing arrow

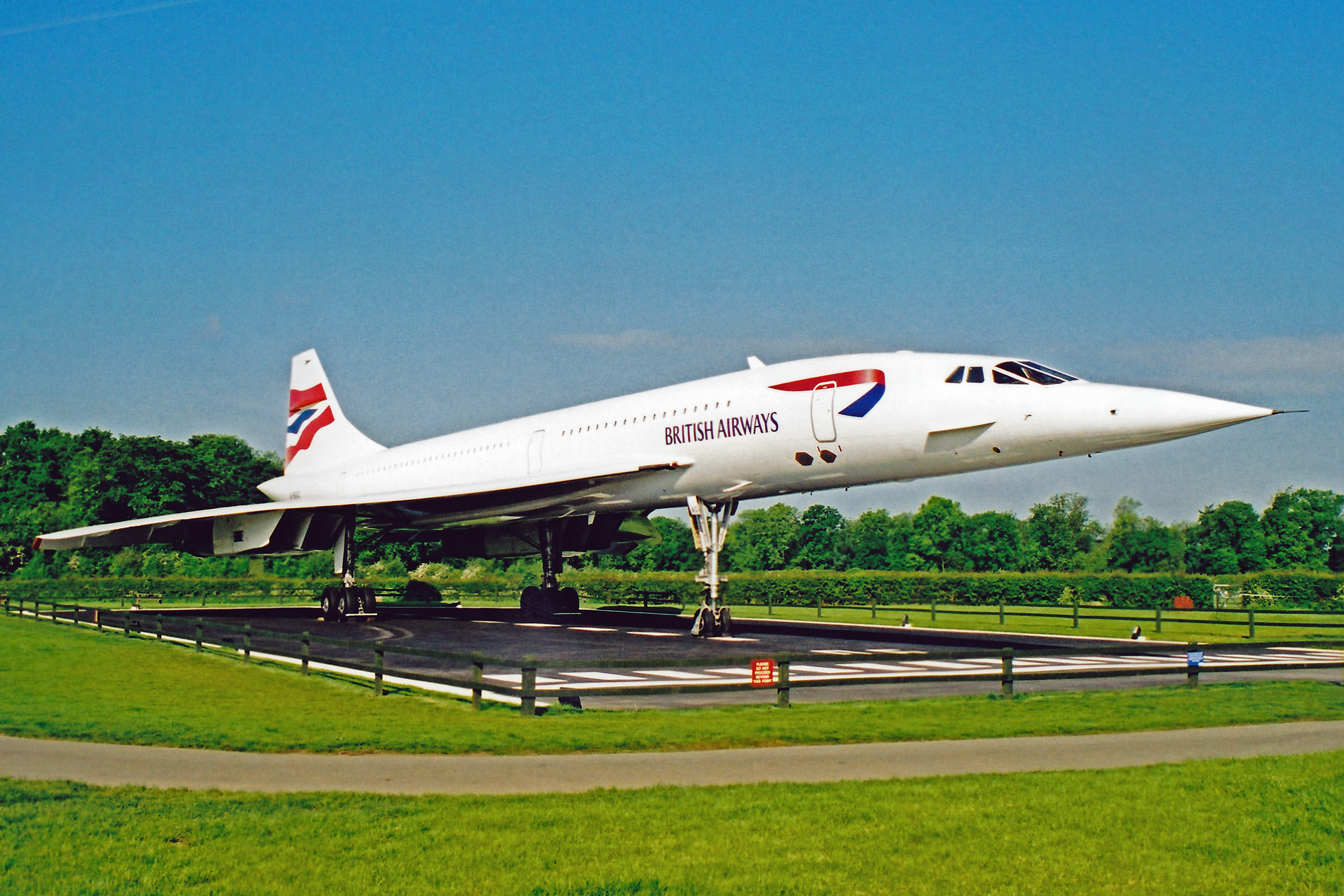
Concorde in "Utopia" livery, Speedmarque ribbon

=== Project Utopia/ethnic livery and Speedmarque ===
In 1997, there was a controversial change to a new Project Utopia livery which used the corporate colours consistently on the fuselage with a lowered beltline; the Utopia livery included multiple tailfin designs. The variety of tailfin designs was intended to reflect the diversity of destinations and countries served by the airline's network of routes; British Airways called these "World Images" and they would become known as the "ethnic images". Examples included Delftware or Chinese calligraphy, meant to symbolise those countries. However, the Concorde fleet would have a unique tailfin design (named Chatham Dockyard Union flag) based on a stylised, fluttering Union flag. This was reported to have caused problems with air traffic control: previously controllers had been able to tell pilots to follow a BA plane, but they were now harder to visually identify.

The art commissioned for the new tailfin designs also appeared elsewhere, such as brochures and ticket boarding jackets. Utopia also changed the Speedwing arrow to a Speedmarque ribbon logo, now carried closer to the nose, above passenger windows.

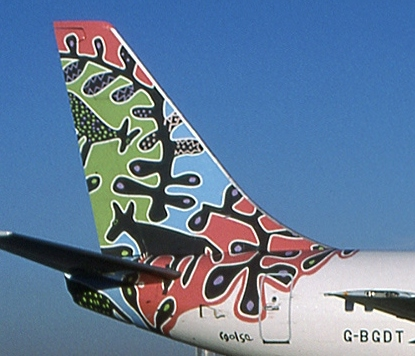
Utopia fin (Animals and Trees tail art)

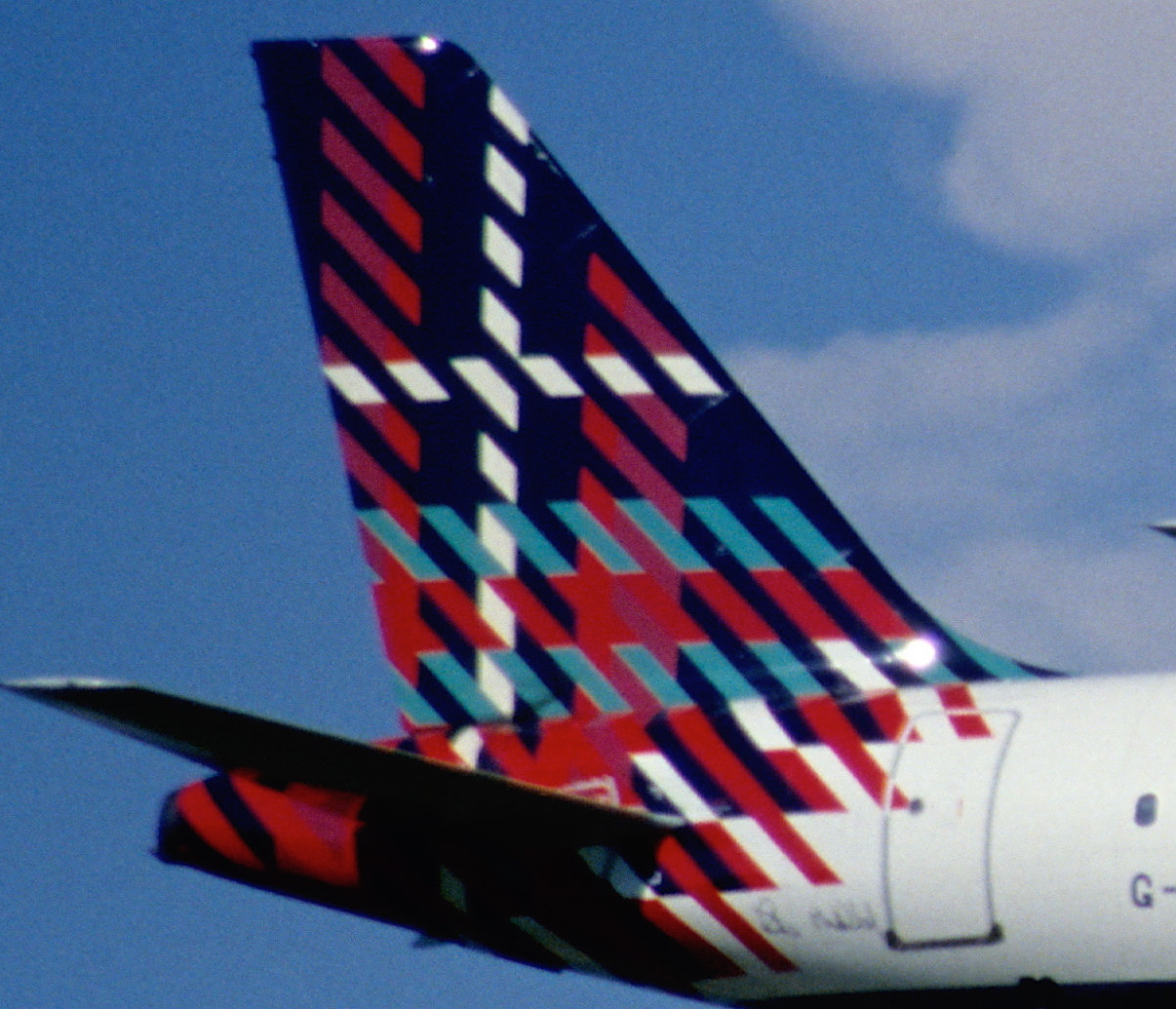
Utopia fin (Benyhone)

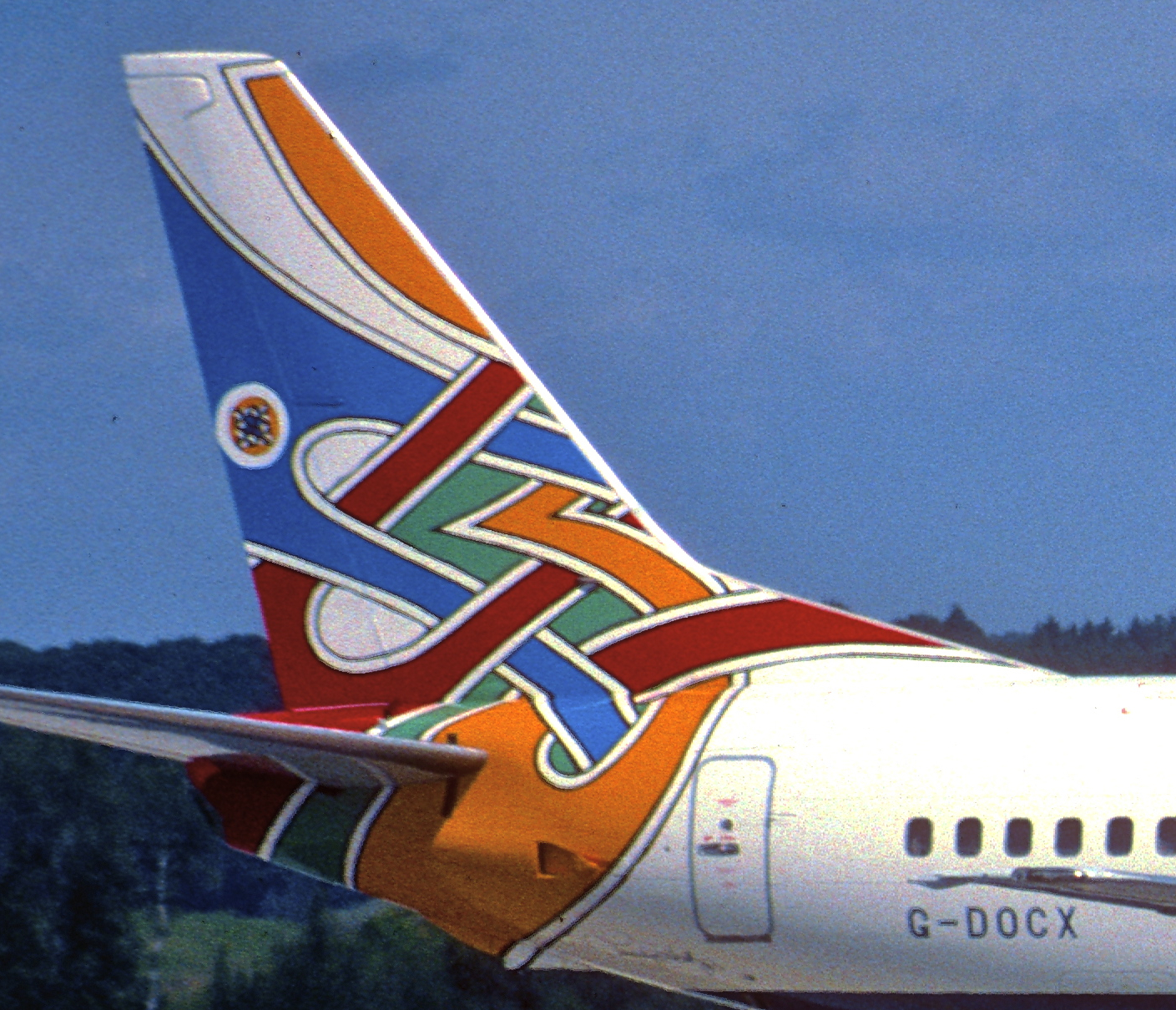
Utopia fin (Colum)

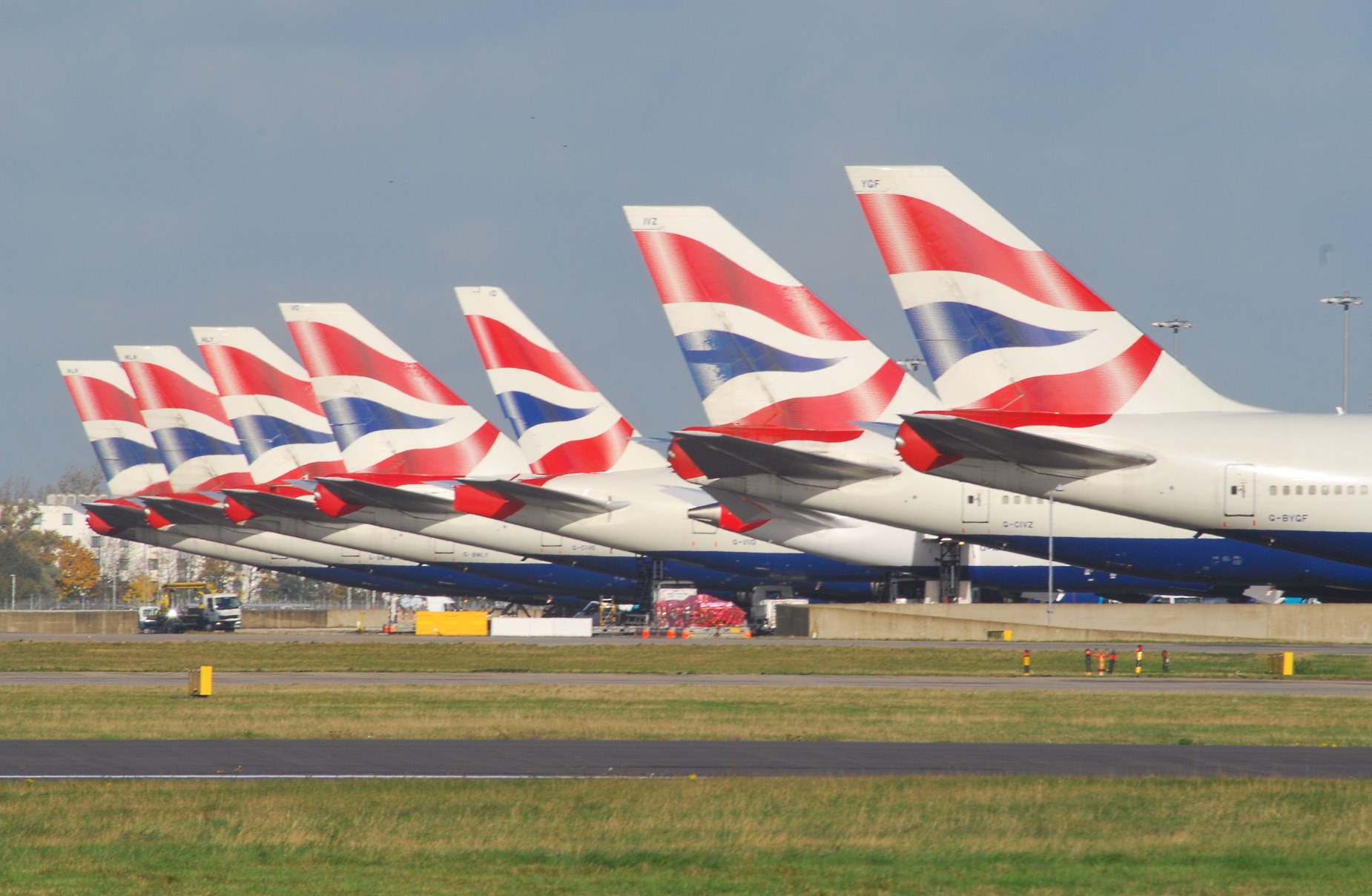
Current consistent use of Chatham Dockyard tail art

Several people spoke out against the change, including the former Prime Minister Margaret Thatcher, who famously covered the tail of a model 747 at an event with a handkerchief, to show her displeasure. BA's traditional rival, Virgin Atlantic, took advantage of the negative press coverage by applying the Union flag to the winglets of their aircraft along with the slogan "Britain's national flagcarrier". In 1999, with approximately half the fleet already repainted with Project Utopia livery, the CEO of British Airways, Bob Ayling, announced that all aircraft that had retained Landor livery would adopt the tailfin design Chatham Dockyard Union Flag originally intended to be used only on the Concorde, based on the Union Flag. After Ayling resigned in 2000, his successor, Rod Eddington, announced the entire fleet would receive the Chatham Dockyard Union flag tail in May 2001. The final aeroplane with a "Utopia" tail — an Airbus A320 with Whale Rider artwork — was retired in 2006. From 2011 on, the company's crest was added back to aircraft.

=== Special liveries ===
British Airways repainted nine Airbus A319s to mark the 2012 Summer Olympics, the front section was painted a feather pattern in gold shade, and the Chatham Dockyard tail flag was also repainted in gold shade. The aircraft that transported the Olympic Flame from Athens to London also have a distinctive yellow, orange, and gold livery, named The Firefly.

BA launched direct service between London Heathrow and Chengdu in 2013; to celebrate, the front of a Boeing 777 was painted to resemble a giant panda. The frequency of service to Chengdu was reduced in 2014 before being suspended in 2017.

In 2021, BA painted one Airbus A320neo (G-TTNA) in what it called its Better World livery, using two blue shades to render the Chatham Dockyard tail flag and adding a coordinating finish to the front half of the aircraft and its engine nacelles. The strapline "Our most important journey yet" advertises BA's efforts to achieve Net Zero emissions.

=== Retrojets ===
In 2019, BA announced plans to repaint one of its Boeing 747 aeroplanes into a retrojet BOAC livery, matching the scheme used on those aircraft between 1964 and 1974. The retro livery was chosen to celebrate the 100th anniversary of the firm, dating back to the formation of Aircraft Transport and Travel Limited in 1919. Other aeroplanes are planned to be repainted into retro liveries, but deliveries of new aircraft will continue in the current "Chatham Dockyard" livery.

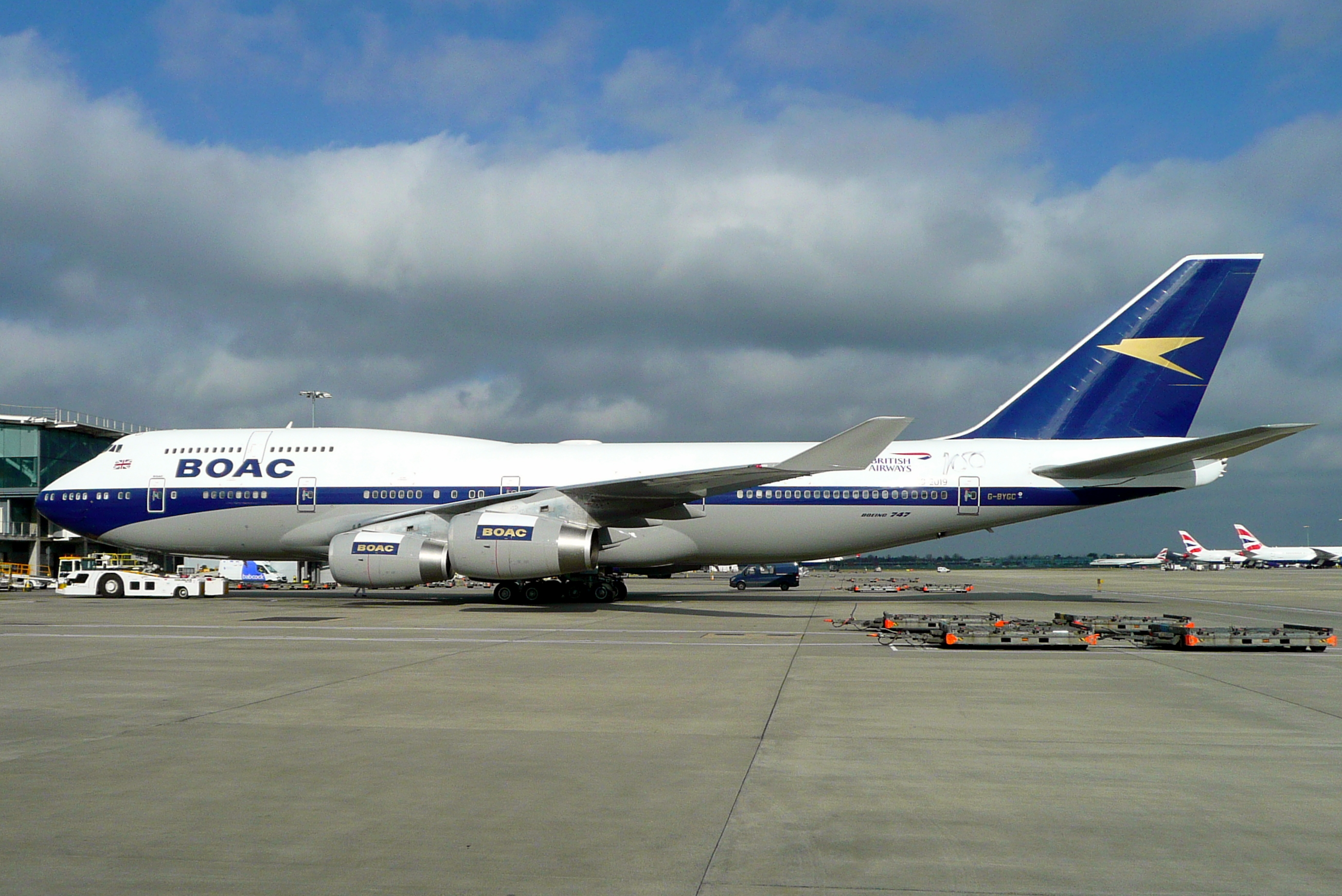
G-BYGC in retrojet BOAC

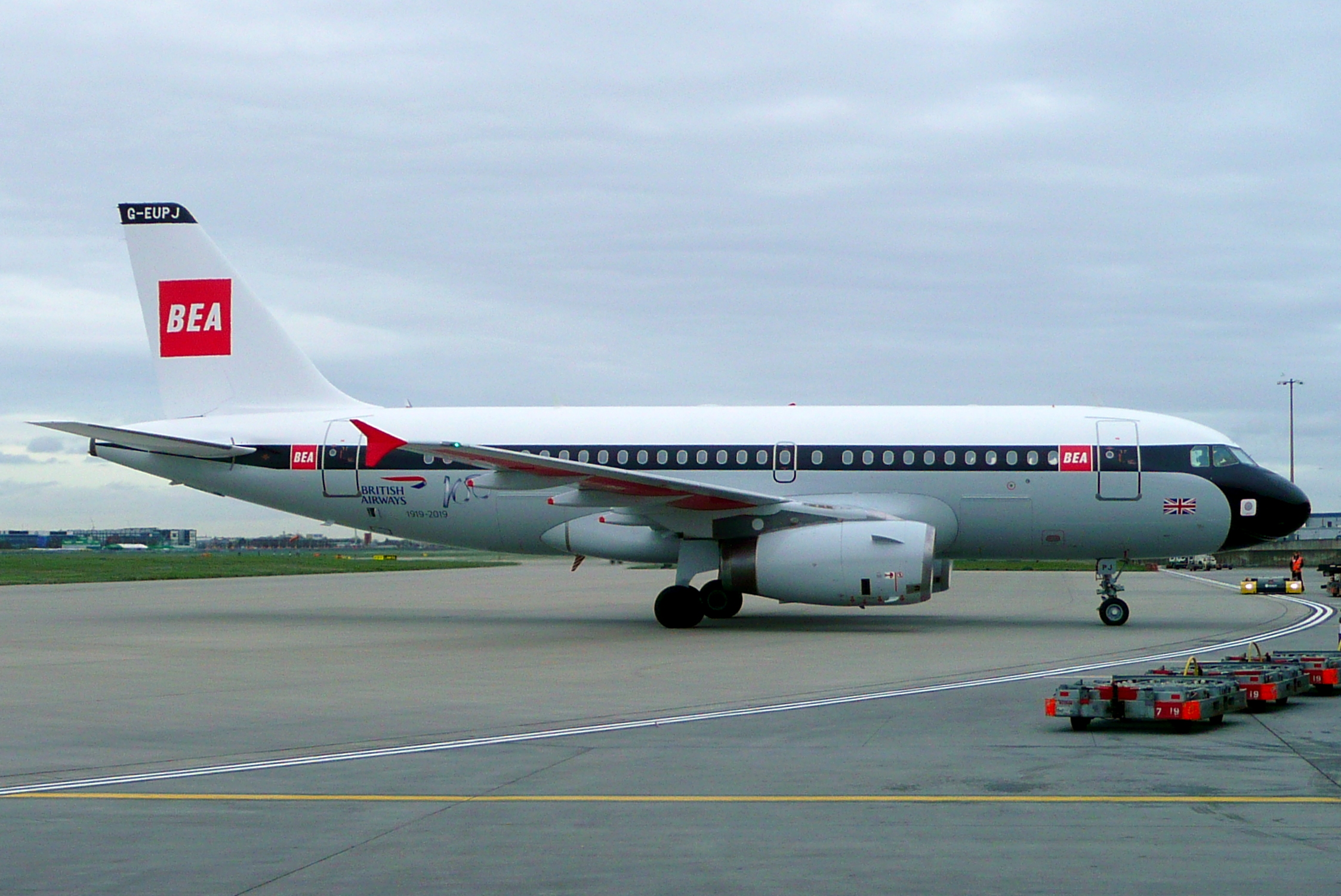
G-EUPJ in retrojet BEA

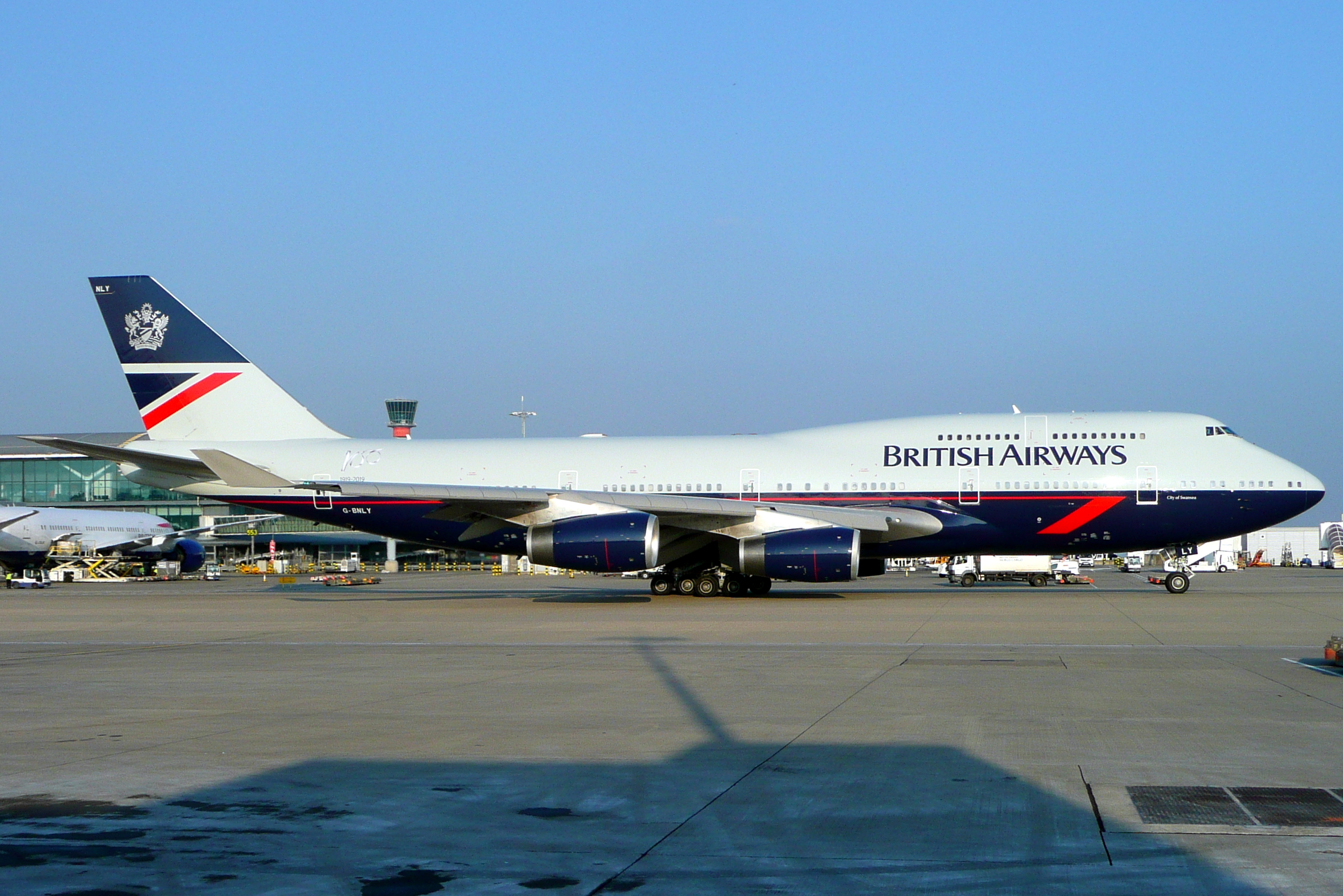
G-BNLY in retrojet Landor

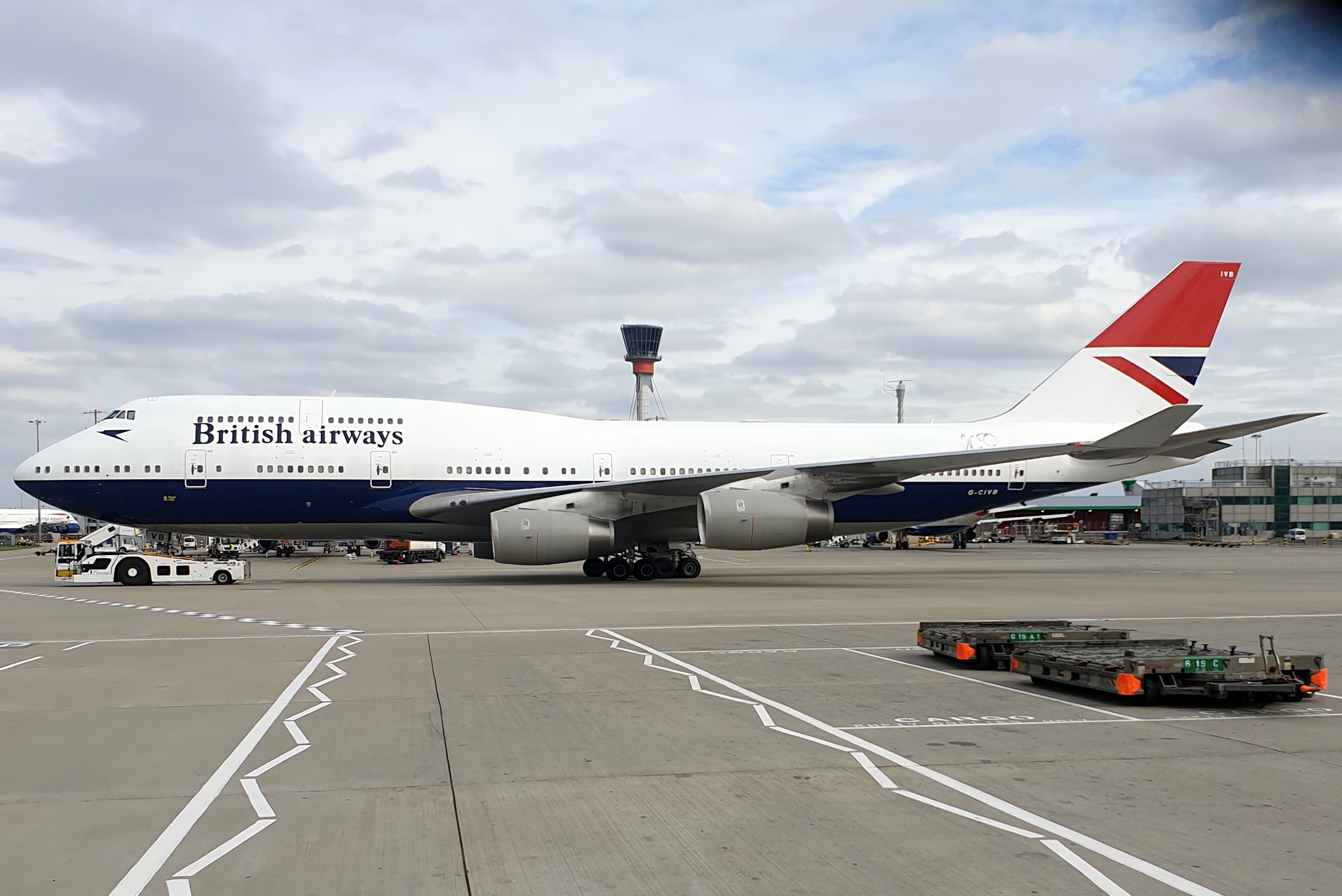
G-CIVB in retrojet Negus

On 22 February 2019, BA announced another retrojet livery. A modified BEA 'Red Square' livery used from 1959 to 1968 would be painted on an Airbus A319 (G-EUPJ), with grey wings instead of red to meet reflectivity requirements. Like the BOAC retrojet livery used on G-BYGC, the hybrid scheme using the "British airways" wordmark was not used. One week later BA announced that B747 G-BNLY would return to the Landor livery it wore upon delivery. The fourth and final retrojet livery was announced for G-CIVB on 15 March, a B747 to be repainted into Negus livery.

Due to the worldwide COVID-19 pandemic, British Airways announced it would be retiring its remaining fleet of Boeing 747s in July 2020. The retrojet 'Negus' livery 747, G-CIVB, was purchased by Cotswold Airport for a nominal fee of £1 in October 2020 and transformed into a "party plane" venue at a cost of £500,000. Similarly, G-BNLY (retrojet 'Landor') and G-BYGC ('BOAC') were preserved, with BNLY going to Dunsfold Aerodrome alongside G-CIVW (a 747 painted in Chatham Dockyard) to serve in the film and television industry, and BYGC going to the Bro Tathan business park as a permanent exhibit.

== Senior leadership ==
=== Senior Leadership ===
- Chairman: Sean Doyle (since April 2021)
- Chief Executive: Sean Doyle (since October 2020)

==== List of Former Chairmen ====
1. Sir David Nicolson (1972–1975)
2. The Lord McFadzean (1976–1979)
3. Sir Ross Stainton (1979–1980)
4. The Lord King (1981–1993)
5. The Lord Marshall (1993–2004)
6. Sir Martin Broughton (2004–2013)
7. Keith Williams (2013–2016)
8. Álex Cruz (2016–2021)

==== List of Former Chief Executives ====
The position was formed in 1977.

1. Sir Ross Stainton (1977–1979)
2. Sir Roy Watts (1979–1983)
3. The Lord Marshall (1983–1995)
4. Bob Ayling (1996–2000)
5. Sir Rod Eddington (2000–2005)
6. Willie Walsh (2005–2010)
7. Keith Williams (2011–2016)
8. Álex Cruz (2016–2020)

== See also ==
- Air transport in the United Kingdom
- Aerospace industry in the United Kingdom § History
- Aviation in the United Kingdom § History
- General aviation in the United Kingdom § History
- History of air traffic control in the United Kingdom
- List of airlines by foundation date

== Bibliography ==
- Beith, Richard (2004). British South American Airways 1946–1949: A Sourcebook for Aerophilatelists. Richard Beith Associates. ISBN 0-9520675-4-4.
- Dearlove, John; Saunders, Peter R. (2000). Introduction to British politics. Polity. ISBN 0-7456-2096-5.
- Doganis, Rigas (2006). The Airline Business. Routledge. ISBN 0-415-34614-2.
- Fisher, Colin; Alan Lovell (2008). Business Ethics and Values: Individual, Corporate and International Perspectives. Pearson Education. ISBN 978-0-273-71616-7.
- Haig, Matt (2005). Brand Failures: The Truth About The 100 Biggest Branding Mistakes of All Time. Kogan Page Publishers. ISBN 0-7494-4433-9.
- Hanlon, Pat; James Patrick Hanlon (1999). Global Airlines: Competition in a Transnational Industry. Butterworth-Heinemann. ISBN 0-7506-4350-1.
- Hayward, Keith (1983). Government and British Civil Aerospace: A Case Study in Post-War Technology Policy. Manchester University Press. ISBN 0-7190-0877-8.
- Martyn, Gregory (1996). Dirty tricks: British Airways' Secret War Against Virgin Atlantic. Warner. ISBN 0-7515-1063-7.
- Millward, Liz (2008). Women in British Imperial Airspace, 1922–1937. McGill-Queen's Press. ISBN 978-0-7735-3337-0.
- Norris, Guy; Mark Wagner (2005). Airbus A380: Superjumbo of the 21st Century. Zenith Imprint. ISBN 0-7603-2218-X.
- Owen, Kenneth (2001). Concorde: Story of a Supersonic Pioneer. Science Museum. ISBN 9781900747424.
- Pigott, Peter (2003). Taming the Skies: A Celebration of Canadian Flight. Dundurn Press. ISBN 1-55002-469-8.
- Simons, Graham M. (1999). It Was Nice to Fly with Friends! The Story of Air Europe. GMS Enterprises.
- Thomson, Adam (1990). High Risk: The Politics of the Air. Sidgwick and Jackson.
- Votteler, Thom (1988). International Directory of Company Histories, Volume 43. St. James Press. ISBN 1-55862-461-9.
- Woodley, Charles (2004). BOAC: An Illustrated History. Tempus. ISBN 0-7524-3161-7.
