= Profiteering =

Term for profiting by unethical methods

Profiteering is a pejorative term for the act of making a profit by methods considered unethical.

== Overview ==
Business owners may be accused of profiteering when they raise prices during an emergency (especially a war). The term is also applied to businesses that play on political corruption to obtain government contracts.

Some types of profiteering are illegal, such as price fixing syndicates, for example on fuel subsidies (see British Airways price-fixing allegations), and other anti-competitive behaviour. Some are restricted by industry codes of conduct, e.g. aggressive marketing of products in the Third World such as baby milk (see Nestlé boycott).

== Types of profiteering ==
- Price fixing
- Price gouging
- War profiteering

== Laws ==
Profiteering is illegal in several countries, including but not limited to:

- UK: Chapter 1 of the Competition Act 1998
- Germany: § 291 StGB (Criminal Code) – up to 10 years' jail maximum penalty
- Austria: § 154 StGB – up to 5 years' jail maximum penalty

== See also ==
- Enshittification
- Hoarding (economics)
- Business ethics
- Price gouging
- Product sabotage
- Rent seeking
- Supracompetitive pricing
- Ticket scalping
- Usury

=== Example cases ===
- British Airways price-fixing allegations
- List of price fixing cases
