= National Anti-profiteering Authority =

Government agency

National Anti-profiteering Authority (NAA) is a government of India body that was set up under Section 171 of the Central Goods and Services Tax Act, 2017. The key purpose of NAA was to make sure that the recipient gets the benefit of input tax credit.

== Body ==
The NAA committee has 5 members that consists of:

1. Chairman
2. Technical Members (4). These members can be the current or former commissioners of the tax department at the state or central level

Besides this, there is an additional Director General of Safeguards under (CBEC) who acts as the Secretary.

== See also ==
- Profiteering
