= Ross Stainton =

British businessman (1914–2011)

Sir John Ross Stainton CBE (27 May 1914 – 5 December 2011) was a British businessman and airline chief executive.

== Life ==
The son of George Stainton and his wife Helen Ross, he attended Glengorse School and Malvern College. He joined Imperial Airways in 1933. From 1940 to 1946, he served in the Royal Air Force from 1940. He joined BOAC in 1949, and worked in its head office from 1954 to 1968, when he came onto its Board. He was its managing director in 1971–2.

Stainton was chief executive of BOAC from 1972 until 1974 when it was merged with BEA into British Airways. He was chief executive of British Airways from 1977 to 1979. He was chairman of its board, 1979–80.

== Personal life ==
Stainton married in 1939 Doreen Werner (ded 2001); the couple had three daughters. his wife died in 2001. He had three daughters. He was awarded the CBE in the 1971 Birthday Honours. He was knighted in the 1981 New Year Honours. He lived in Camberley, off the B311.

Stainton died 5 December 2011, age 97.

Business positions
Preceded by Sir Frank McFadzean	Chairman of British Airways; 1979 – 1980	Succeeded by John King, Baron King of Wartnaby
Preceded by Two divisions merged into one	Chief Executive of British Airways; 1977 – 1979	Succeeded by Roy Watts
Preceded by New company	Chief Executive of British Airways Overseas Division (former BOAC); 1974 – 1977	Succeeded by Two divisions merged into one
Preceded by	Chairman and Chief Executive of BOAC; 1972 – 1974	Succeeded by Defunct company
Preceded by	Managing Director of BOAC; 1971 – 1972	Succeeded by
