= Francis McFadzean, Baron McFadzean of Kelvinside =

Scottish businessman and economist

The Right Honourable The Lord McFadzean of Kelvinside FRSE
- Born: 26 November 1915; Troon, Ayrshire
- Died: 23 May 1992 (aged 76); Bisham, Berkshire
- Education: Glasgow University; London School of Economics
- Spouses: Isabel McKenzie Beattie (m. 1938; died 1987) Sonja Khung (m. 1988)
- Military career
- Allegiance: United Kingdom
- Branch: British Army
- Service years: 1940–1945
- Rank: Colonel
- Unit: Duke of Cornwall's Light Infantry
- Conflicts: World War II

Colonel Francis Scott McFadzean, Baron McFadzean of Kelvinside FRSE (26 November 1915 – 23 May 1992) was a Scottish businessman and economist.

== Life ==
Born in Troon, Ayrshire, McFadzean was educated locally then studied at the University of Glasgow (graduating MA) and the London School of Economics. After working as a civil servant, he fought with the Duke of Cornwall's Light Infantry during World War II, reaching the rank of colonel and seeing service in Egypt.

From 1964 to 1976, McFadzean served as the Managing Director of Royal Dutch Shell. In 1976, he was appointed Chairman of British Airways by Harold Wilson. In 1979, he became the Chairman of Rolls-Royce.

McFadzean was created a Knight Bachelor by Queen Elizabeth II in 1975. On 1 September 1980, he was created a life peer, as Baron McFadzean of Kelvinside, of Kelvinside in the District of the City of Glasgow.

In 1989 he was elected a Fellow of the Royal Society of Edinburgh. His proposers were Sir Samuel Curran, Sir John Atwell, John Hawthorn, W. H. Stimson, and W. W. Fletcher.

== Family ==
He married twice: in 1938 to Isabel Beattie, and following her death in 1987 he married Sonja Khung in 1988.

== Works ==
- Towards an open world economy. 1972
- Towards an understanding of our new hydrocarbon age. 1973
- The Economics of John Kenneth Galbraith: a Study in Fantasy. 1977
- Introduction to John Jewkes, A return to free market economics. 1978
- Global strategy for growth : a report on north-south issues. 1981
