= Christen Ager-Hanssen =

Norwegian entrepreneur

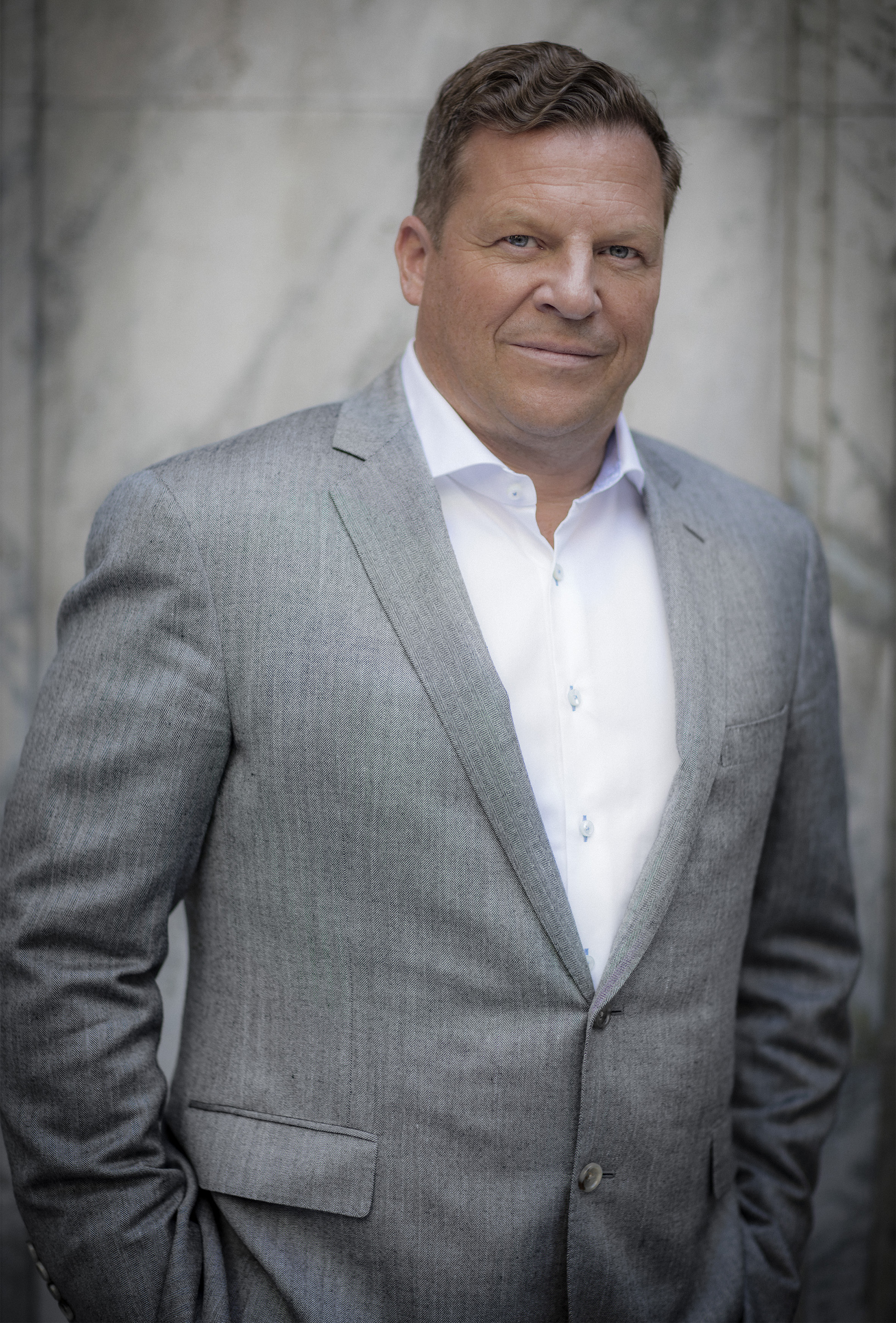
- Born: July 29, 1962 (age 64); Halden, Norway
- Occupations: Venture capitalist & entrepreneur

Christen Eugen Ager-Hanssen (born July 29, 1962) is a Norwegian internet entrepreneur and venture capitalist. Since the late 1990s, he has been based in London and is a highly controversial private equity professional. Ager-Hanssen was involved in several high-profile M&A deals and has become known for public hostile takeovers. In a Canadian Business cover story, he was described as both Gordon Gekko and a modern-day Viking. In 1999 he claims to have become one of Norway's richest citizens, although investigative journalists have disputed this.

Ager-Hanssen claims to be recognized for his expertise in the Internet. His work to commercialize the Internet in the 1990s included early experiments with search engines, internet infrastructure such as satellite internet access, legal music distribution, banking and financial services, e-mail advertising, banner ads, and pay-per-click advertising. He invests in various companies through his investment vehicle, Custos.

On May 3, 2024, he was sentenced to ten months imprisonment for failing to comply with court orders. On August 19, 2024, he was declared Bankrupt by the UK High Court.

== Early life ==
Christen Ager-Hanssen was born in Halden, Norway. He is the son of Norwegian industrialist and nuclear physicist Henrik Ager-Hanssen (1930–2004) and politician Bjørg Ager-Hanssen. He grew up in Halden, Oslo, and Stavanger before he moved to Sweden where he worked for IBM and Kinnevik in Stockholm.

== Controversies ==
=== Covert recording ===
In 2011, he was reported for witness tampering and blackmail after secretly recording Ugland's lawyer Tom Knudsen. Knudsen told the court that Ager-Hanssen had threatened him via text message that he would release the recordings if Knudson did not acquiesce to his demands. He is also said to have approached Ugland's financial director Jan Erik Tønnessen outside his home at midnight, threatening him also. Tønnessen told journalists "He scared me and my family. I was told that I had to cooperate with them. Otherwise there would be things on NRK. Brennpunkt...I am now seriously considering going to the police about this."

In 2014, Ager-Hanssen told Dagens Nyheter he had "rigged a hidden recording device" at his home during a meeting with HQ Bank chairman Christer Sandberg.

In 2016, Ager-Hanssen covertly recorded the filmmaker Fredrik von Krusenstjerna who was reportedly making a documentary about HQ Bank. The recording was secretly uploaded to YouTube and the documentary was scrapped.

In 2022, Ager-Hanssen covertly recorded the lawyer Kyle Roche at his office in London, after paying for tickets for Roche and his wife to fly over. The videos surfaced months later on kompromat website Cryptoleaks. Roche claims he was drugged during the encounter and did not have a recollection of everything discussed. Ager-Hanssen initially denied being behind the sting, and made threats towards Kyle Roche over the claim, but confessed in a 2023 Norwegian interview.

In 2023, Ager-Hanssen published covert recordings he had made of nChain chairman Stefan Matthews.

=== Work with Black Cube ===
Ager-Hanssen claims to have worked with Black Cube, the controversial private intelligence agency as far back as the company's inception, while working for the businessman Vincent Tchenguiz.

=== True Blue app ===
In April 2024, the Guardian published an article alleging Ager-Hanssen had worked with the UK's Conservative Party to develop an app to monetise the personal data of their members. The app would have given the party and Ager-Hanssen's company Addreax a cut of sales from the various brand deals Ager-Hanssen claimed to have in place with companies such as Coca-Cola, British Gas and ASOS (retailer). The brands denied any knowledge of a partnership with Ager-Hanssen.

Several politicians criticised Ager-Hanssen for donating £70,000 to the Conservative Party, which they claim unjustly afforded him private meetings with the Prime Minister Rishi Sunak and the then Home Secretary Suella Braverman.

=== Shamalova Divorce ===
On January 2, 2024, Ager-Hanssen was sued by Zhanna Shamalova, the ex-wife of Kirill Shamalov.

Shamalova claims she paid Ager-Hanssen's Custos Group company £600,000 for ‘Conflict Management and Litigation Strategy Advice’ and a further £500,000 to find a pay a legal team to represent her.

According to Shamalova's court filing, the divorce petition was filed the week she paid Ager-Hanssen the money and was told he would work on looking for her husband's assets in the meantime. After waiting almost a year with no updates, Shamalova claims she contacted the legal team herself, who reportedly told her Ager-Hanssen had stopped all work after the initial filing and stopped their retainer. Shamalova claims Ager-Hanssen agreed to return the money to her in February 2023, but did not do so. She filed a claim for £1.1 million on January 2, 2024.

=== Norion Bank ===
In March 2025, Ager-Hanssen was reported to the Swedish police by Norion Bank who accused him blackmail and extortion.

== Business career ==
In the early 1980s, Ager-Hanssen was employed by different blue chip computer technology companies such as Burroughs, Digital Equipment Corporation and IBM. In the early 1990s, Ager-Hanssen became a recognized speaker in the field of business process reengineering and legacy information systems.

=== Investment AB Kinnevik ===
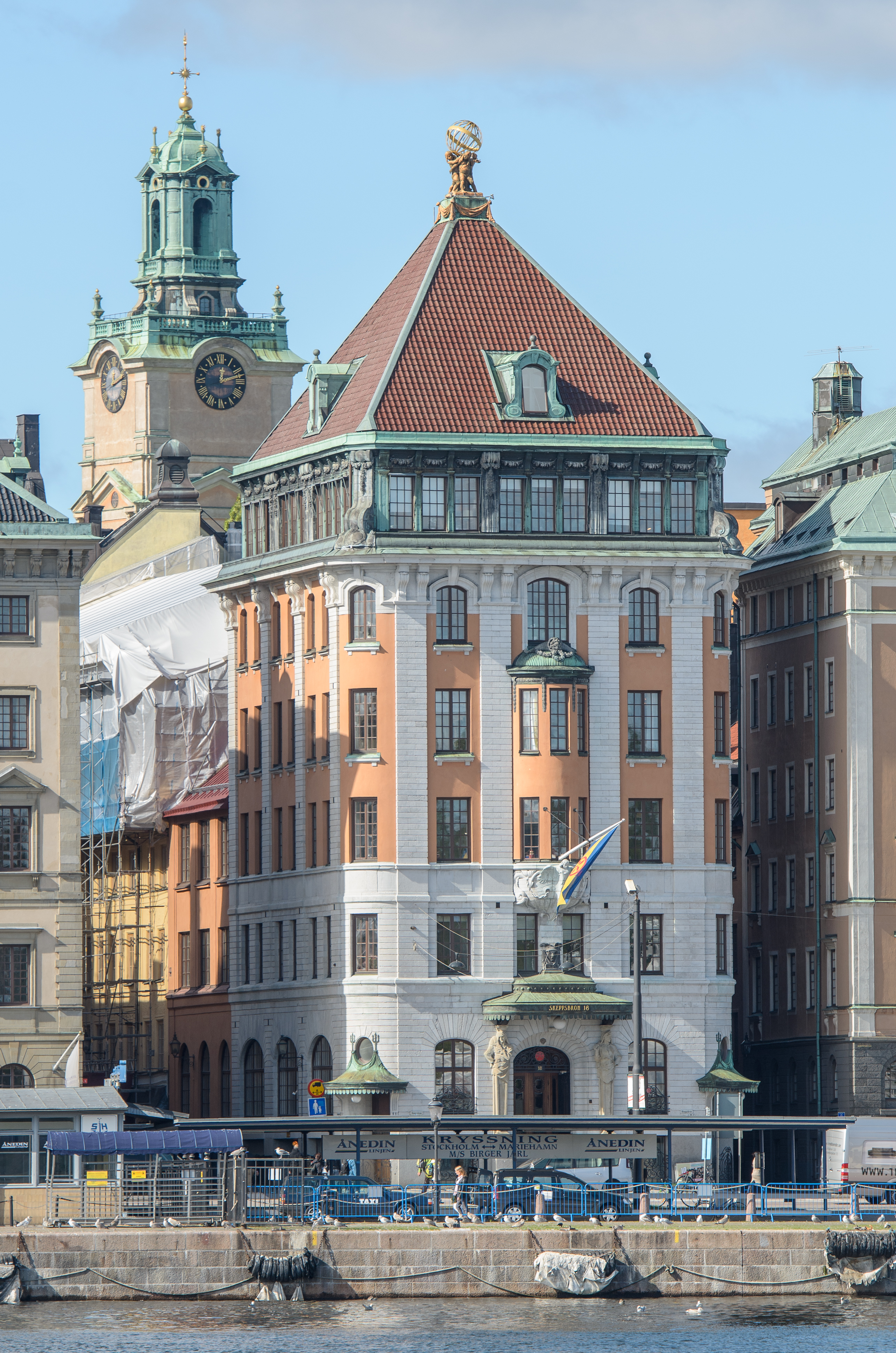
Kinnevik's head office in Stockholm.

Ager-Hanssen is a former Kinnevik AB group executive. Ager-Hanssen was also a senior executive in the Kinnevik group with regards to Tele2 AB and its international expansion. He founded several internet startups together with Investment AB Kinnevik, including Netsys Technology Group, Webware and Polarsearch, one of the first search engines in Scandinavia.

=== Stock trader ===
Ager-Hanssen has been an active investor on the Swedish stock exchange who invested in many blue chip companies. In 1999, he told Dagens Industri he made huge profits from being a brilliant stock trader rather than making a profit from his investment portfolio. He claims his investment portfolio was at the time valued at SEK 1.7 billion.

=== Addreax ===
In 2019, Ager-Hanssen founded Addreax, a 'MarTech' (Marketing technology) company. It acts as the parent company for several marketing apps, including Stuk, Adviral and CheSconto!.

In 2020, Adviral went into administration with 4.4 million Swedish krona in debt. According to Dagens Industri, the money relates to compensation for the groups influencers and bloggers.

In December 2023, Ager-Hanssen announced a partnership between Addreax and Corriere dello Sport.

In March 2024, Ager-Hanssen became embroiled in a controversy involving social media influencers Matilda Djerf and Hanna Schönberg. Ager-Hanssen told journalists he had been reporting them both to the Swedish Consumer Agency via the Addreax owned Metro Mode, as well as leaving comments under their social media posts relating to their declarations to the Swedish Tax Agency. Ager-Hanssen told journalists "We think you should follow the existing EU directives and we get annoyed with influencers who don't follow these rules. Then it is up to the Swedish Consumer Agency to do something about it."

=== nChain ===
In November 2022, Ager-Hanssen was appointed as the CEO of nChain group. On September 29, 2023, Ager-Hanssen claimed to have resigned due to disagreements with the company's board. The same day, nChain released a statement acknowledging that it had “parted company” with Ager-Hanssen and appointed Stefan Matthews as its new CEO. On September 30, 2023, nChain issued a further statement that Ager-Hanssen had “conducted himself in a serious and inappropriate manner which prompted the decision to dismiss Mr. Ager-Hanssen with immediate effect.”

On February 28, 2024, nChain filed a bankruptcy petition against Ager-Hanssen.

On May 3, 2024, Ager-Hanssen was sentenced to 10 months imprisonment for failing to comply with court orders. Justice Jacobs outlined the timeline of events leading up to the committal, detailing how Ager-Hanssen was ordered to surrender data he had taken from nChain's to an independent forensic examiner and disclose whom he had shared copies with. Ager-Hanssen withdrew from the hearings and did not comply with further orders. He tweeted on May 25, 2024, that he had filed an appeal against the judgement. As of August 2024, no appeal has been filed with the court.

In October 2025, police and bailiffs raided Ager-Hanssen's Stockholm hotel and seized his assets. They had been sent by the court to place a lien on assets to satisfy a judgement of 59 million kronor.

== Venture capital ==
=== Joint venture with the National Pension Fund of Sweden ===
In early 1998, Ager-Hanssen made a bid for NetSys Technology Group, including Webware and Polarsearch, together with the National Pension Fund of Sweden. The bid was successful and ended up with Ager-Hanssen controlling 60% of the company through a newly established joint venture with the National Pension Fund of Sweden. Kinnevik and other shareholders subsequently made a successful exit. In June 1998, Ager-Hanssen made a successful hostile cash bid on the publicly traded company Verimation AB for SEK 120 million. Ager-Hanssen thereafter delisted the company and integrated the business into the joint venture with the Pension Fund. Verimation had developed one of the first email systems in the world and branded it Memo. Memo had approximately 2.5 million end-user clients at the time and was well established among Fortune 500 companies. Later that year, the NetSys Technology Group was valued at more than USD 388 million.

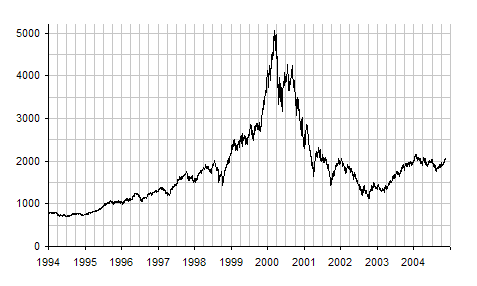
NASDAQ - Graph including the Dot-com Bubble.

Just before the dot-com bubble burst in 2000, Ager-Hanssen chose to divest his shares in the joint venture with the Pension Fund. The profit from the divestment was used to fuel his investment activities. The National Pension Fund lost more than SEK 350 million on the investment. Their perceived lack of competence was criticized lengthily in the Swedish press, and they tried to escape the spotlight by blaming Ager-Hanssen. Later that year, NetSys Technology Group was valued to more than US$388 million.

=== Cognition ===
In 1998, Ager-Hanssen founded a venture capital company called Cognition where he organized most of his Internet-related investment. He employed several high-profile individuals, such as Ulf Sundqvist, former trade minister in Finland, and Gillian Nott, a former financial service authority director. He appointed Ron Sandler as the non-executive chairman who was the former Lloyd's of London chief executive and a former NatWest executive.

Ager-Hanssen claims Cognition was valued by HSBC at the beginning of 2000 at approximately GBP 1 billion and planned for an initial public offering (IPO) on the London Stock Exchange. During this same period, Ager-Hanssen was pursued by accountancy firm Robson Rhodes for allegedly not paying Cognition staff salaries for several months.

Cognition secured an investment from Norwegian investor Hakon Korsgaard, on the condition Ager-Hanssen would float the company. The company did not float and went bankrupt shortly thereafter. Ager-Hanssen was taken to court by Korsgaard over the money. Ager-Hanssen claimed Korsgaard owed him money.

=== Dot-com bubble ===
In many articles in Scandinavia, the US, and the UK, Ager-Hanssen was portrayed as a visible symbol for the bubble.

== Investments ==
=== Media industry ===
==== Metro Media House ====
Ager-Hanssen's investment company Custos acquired the Metro from Kinnevik AB in February 2017. The Metro was the original disrupter in the media industry and the world's first free newspaper launched as early as 1995. At the time, Metro was the biggest newspaper in Sweden. The company had interests in music, fashion, recruitment, health, esports, and loyalty programs. At the time of the acquisition, Ager-Hanssen was quoted, saying: "All of Metro’s business culture is based on surprising the market and doing business that shake up the industry, this fits perfectly with our ambitions in the media sector".

In 2019, Metro's publisher announced they had laid off all of Metro's journalists. Ager-Hanssen told Dagens Media that Metro would relaunch as a platform for people to pay to publish opinion and debate posts. According to Swedish media, Ager-Hanssen wanted to charge between 5-50 thousand Swedish Krona (£369-£36900) to publish on the platform. He is quoted as saying : "Why should you pay journalists when you can get paid to publish content."

The company also attempted a corporate restructuring, which was initially approved by the Stockholm District Court, however, the company's largest creditor, the Swedish Tax Agency, had the order overturned. In February 2020, Metro was declared bankrupt.

=== Involvement with Johnston Press ===
Christen Ager-Hanssen, a Norwegian businessman and owner of the investment company Custos, became significantly involved with Johnston Press, a British newspaper group, in the mid-2010s. His interaction with Johnston Press was characterised by a series of strategic moves, public disputes, and legal actions, reflecting his intention to reshape the company's leadership and operational direction.

==== Stake acquisition and boardroom challenge ====
Ager-Hanssen's involvement with Johnston Press began in 2017 when, through Custos, he acquired a significant strategic stake in the company, making him one of its largest shareholders. In October 2017, Ager-Hanssen publicly announced his intention to overhaul Johnston Press's board, nominating Alex Salmond, former First Minister of Scotland, as the company's potential chairman. Ager-Hanssen's strategy was predicated on radically changing Johnston Press's business model, focusing on the digital media and leveraging the company's audience to help kickstart new ventures.

==== Legal and financial hurdles ====
Ager-Hanssen's plans were initially hampered by a 'dead hand proxy', a controversial corporate defense mechanism that required an immediate repayment of Johnston Press's debt if the control of the board were to change. Through public statements, Ager-Hanssen criticised the use of the defense measure and expressed his determination to carry on with his plans.

==== Acquisition by JPIMedia and aftermath ====
Despite his stake in the company, Ager-Hanssen was not able to prevent Johnston Press from entering administration and its subsequent acquisition by JPIMedia in November 2018. Ager-Hanssen criticised the sale process and declared he would initiate legal actions against the new owners. His interaction with Johnston Press was characterised by a confrontational style and a persistent critique of the company's management. Despite the challenges faced, Ager-Hanssen significantly influenced the company's strategic direction during a critical phase of its restructuring.

=== Airline and leisure industry ===
In 2005 Ager-Hanssen and John Robert Porter invested together in the airline and travel industry. They acquired, among others, a controlling stake in the almost bankrupt publicly listed company FlyMe Europe AB (FLY-B.SK). FlyMe Europe was a low-cost carrier based in Gothenburg that aimed to be one of the leading low-cost carriers in Europe.

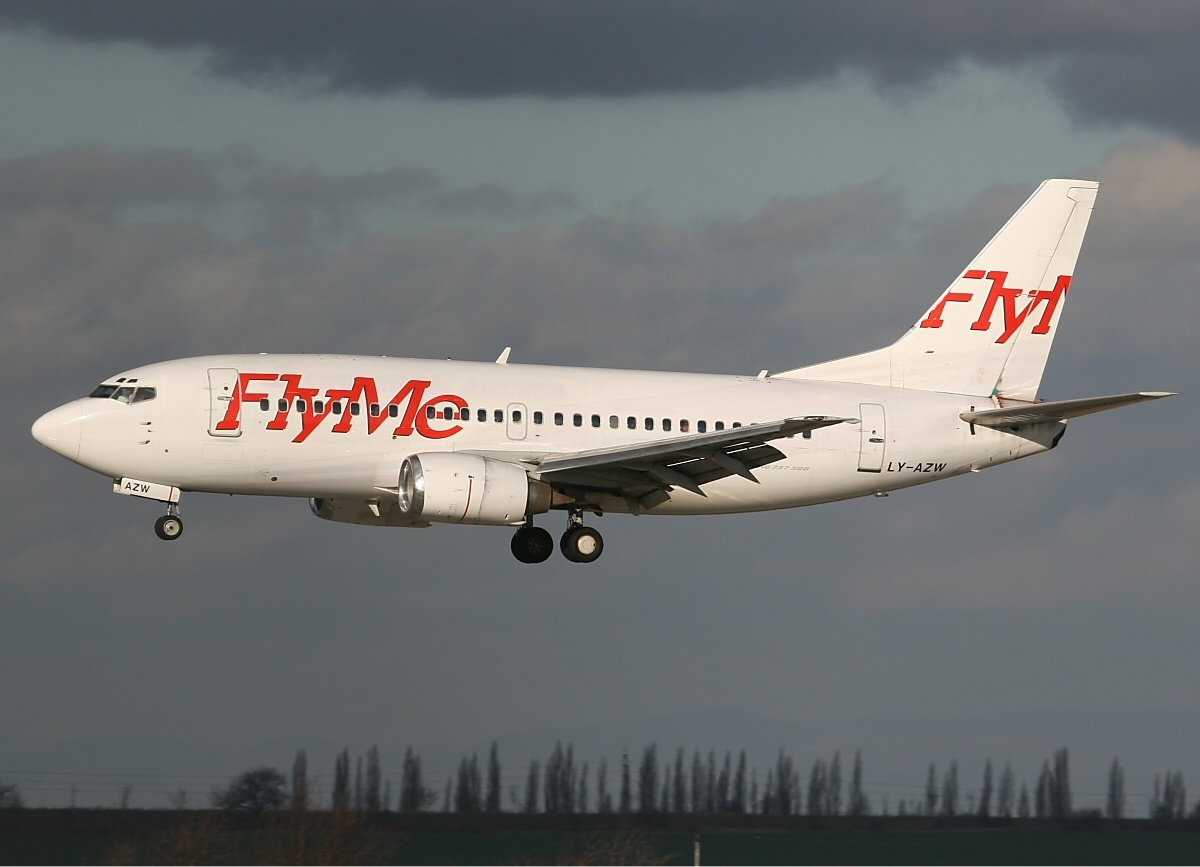
FlyMe Boeing 737-500.

==== FlyMe Europe ====
Ager-Hanssen and Porter's first step in achieving their goal of being a leading low-cost carrier in Europe was to convince the owner of the biggest Danish carrier Sterling European Airlines A/S and Maersk Air, Icelandic billionaire Palmi Haraldsson, to join their plan. Haraldsson agreed and acquired a strategic holding in FlyMe Europe; Haraldsson had already invested DKK 500 million in Sterling European Airlines and an undisclosed amount in Maersk Air and Iceland Express, and saw an opportunity to bring it all together in a listed holding company such as FlyMe Europe. They changed the board and raised SEK 272 million after securing a majority stake and voting control in FlyMe to fuel the company's international expansion and to position it for consolidation in the airline industry.

==== Low-cost carrier consolidation ====
In late 2005, Haraldsson accepted an offer from the FL Group to divest his holding in Sterling Airlines (the merged entity of Sterling European Airlines and Maersk) for DKK 1.5 billion. The FL Group was led by Hannes Smárason, who had at the time a 16 percent strategic holding in the second-largest low-cost carrier in Europe, EasyJet, as well as holdings in American Airlines.

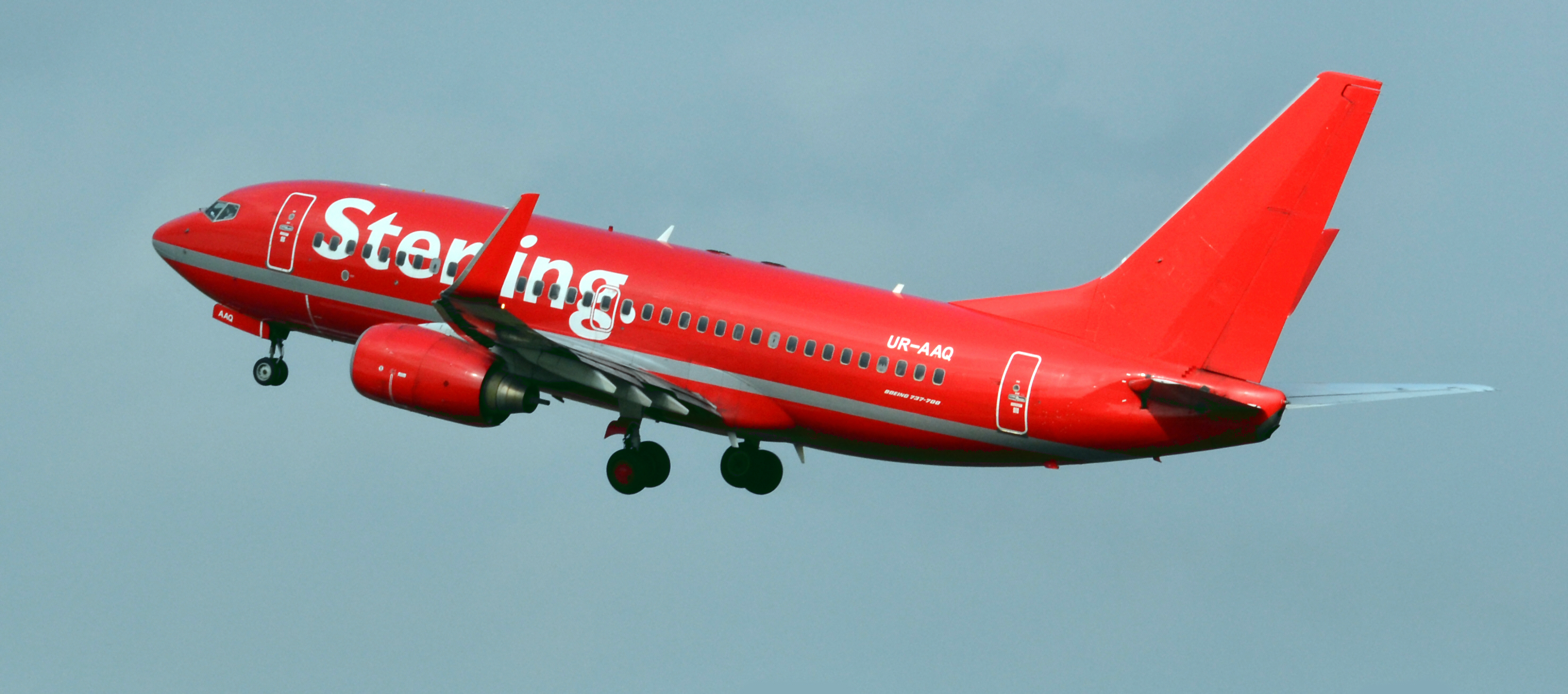
Sterling Airlines, 737-700.

Ager-Hanssen and Haraldsson continued the consolidation discussion with Smárason and the FL Group's majority owner Baugur represented by Icelandic billionaire Jón Ásgeir Jóhannesson. The plan was for Sterling Airlines to do a "reverse takeover" based on a DKK 2 billion valuation on Sterling Airlines A/S. After some preliminary due diligence of Sterling in June and July 2006 FlyMe's board and Ager-Hanssen decided to not proceed with the acquisition of Sterling.

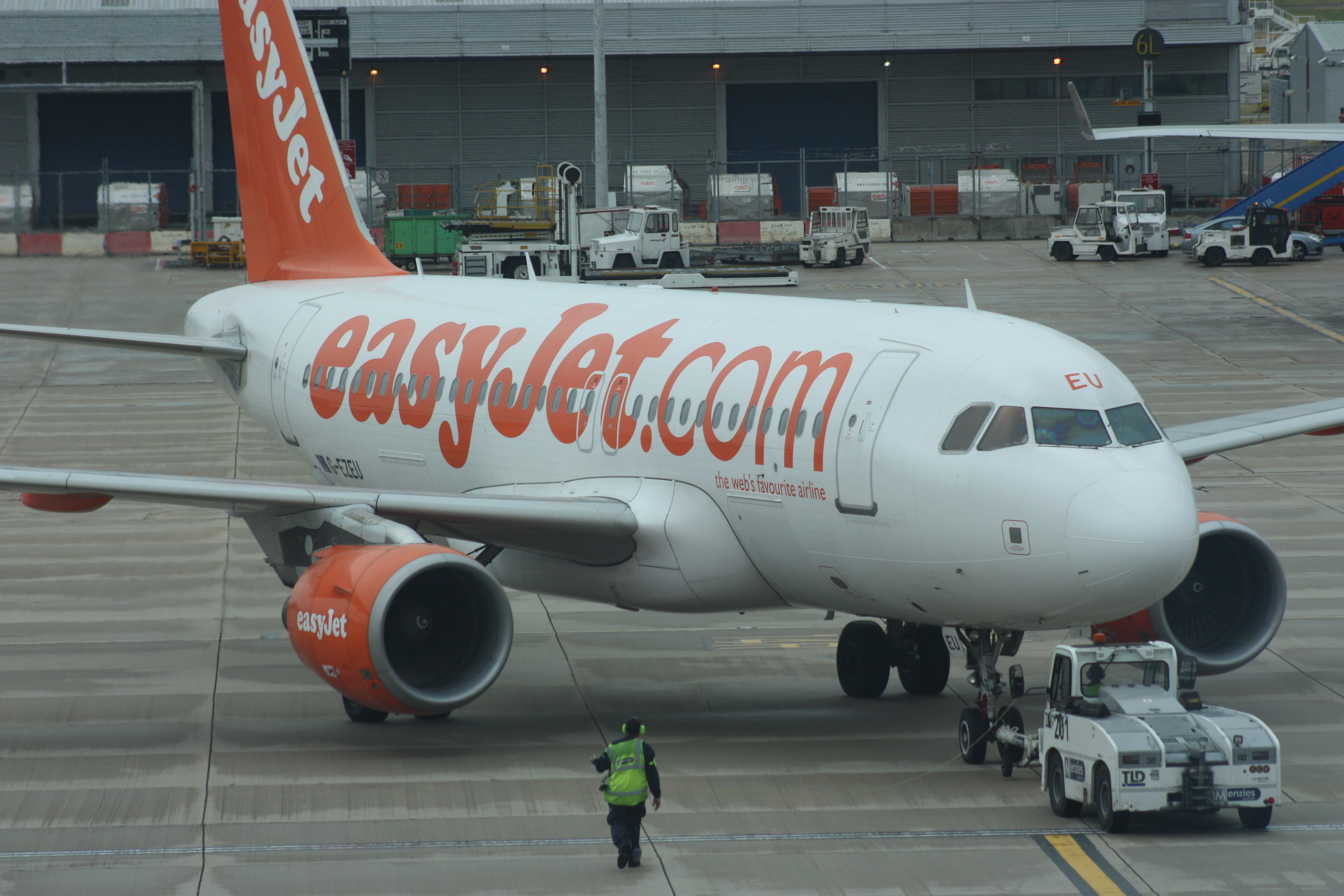
Easyjet, Airbus

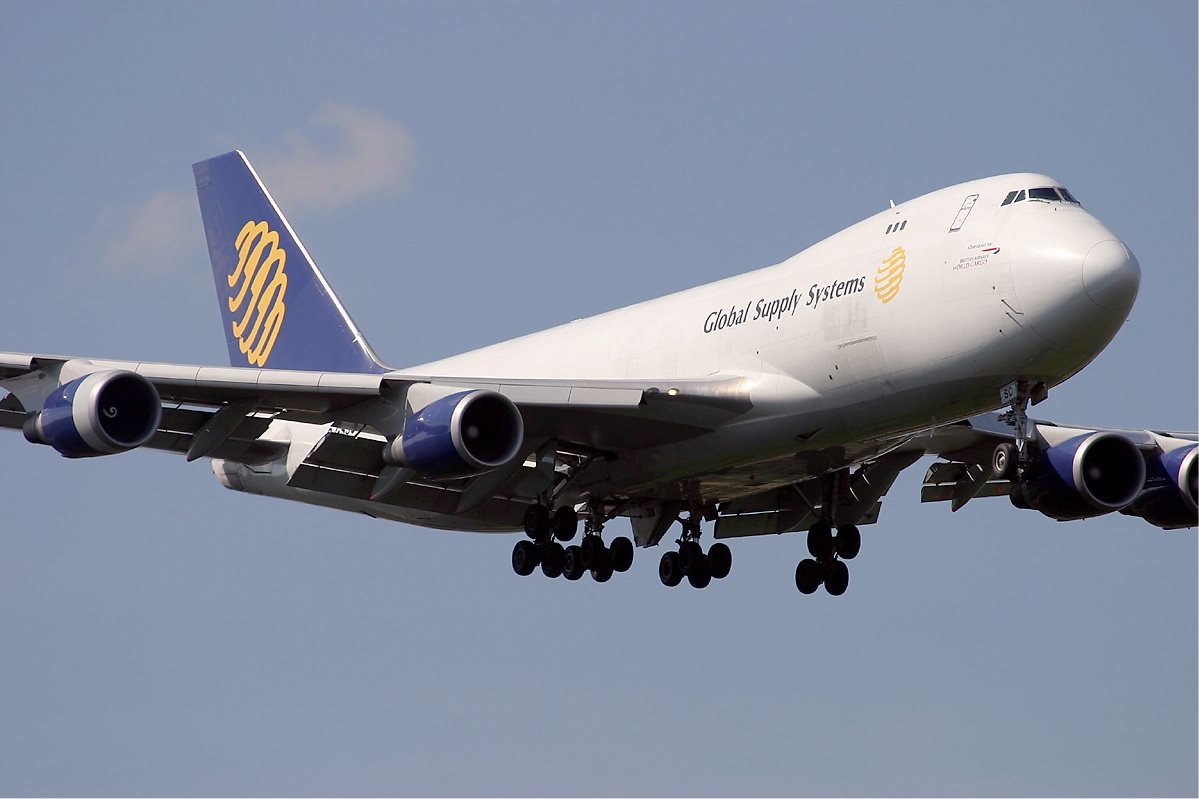
Global Supply Systems Boeing 747-400

The decision to not acquire Sterling disturbed Haraldsson and Smárason's take-over plan, and made it impossible for Ager-Hanssen and Porter to continue a business relationship with Haraldsson. In September 2006, they acquired Haraldsson's shares in FlyMe Europe, which led to a battle between the airlines with no winners.

FlyMe announced they were seeking a new share issue of SEK 194 million, with Cognition Ventures guaranteeing SEK 130 million themselves. Swedish media questioned whether or not the company had the money. The company had until the 28th February to find the money.

On the 28th February 2007, the company's board met to approve the end of year report. Members were told the report would be ready by 9am, however, it still had not arrived by 5pm. One board member told Swedish media "It is completely unacceptable that we have to make such a gigantic decision in a company that has very large liquidity concerns where the new issue is said to be fully subscribed, but where significant parts of the issue have not been paid in and you cannot tell when the money will arrive. It is hoped that they will arrive today, but this is not known.”

Cognition had not raised the capital required and the board refused to sign off the end of year report, leaving no choice but to put the company into bankruptcy. Chairmain of the board, Thommy Nillsson, blamed Cognition for the collapse, stating "I think this is extremely tragic. It is very sad that we did not receive the guarantee that we received from Cognition. If we had received that guarantee, we would have been able to close the issue and then we would not have had to do what we did”.

==== Global Supply Systems ====
Ager-Hanssen and Porter also had a controlling stake in the English-based freight operator Global Supply Systems (GSS). GSS was launched in 2001 as a British all-cargo carrier whose principal business was to provide aircraft on long-term leases to other airlines on an ACMI (Aircraft, Crew, Maintenance, Insurance) basis. GSS was a joint venture with Atlas Air Worldwide, who operates the world's largest fleet of modern Boeing 747 all-cargo aircraft and was a 49% partner in GSS. In 2007 Porter and Ager-Hanssen's GSS signed a five-year contract with British Airways (BA), which at the time was described as the largest-ever freighter investment made by BA with total operating costs of over US$1 billion. Porter and Ager-Hanssen controlled 51% of GSS through Riverdon Ltd.

In 2007, FlyMe acquired a strategic minority stake in GSS with the plan to become the first airline in the world to produce low-cost long-haul flights from Scandinavia to the US and Thailand. GSS was divested in 2009.

==== Ticket ====
Ager-Hanssen and Porter continued to invest in the leisure industry and acquired a strategic stake in Ticket, one of the leading Scandinavian travel agencies and publicly listed company, and changed their board through a hostile takeover. The company was divested in 2008.

=== Telecom & technology industry ===
Ager-Hanssen has had several investments in the telecom industry. Among the more well-known is his early investment in Glocalnet, which is owned today by Telenor. Ager-Hanssen's Cognition invested SEK 80 million together with Brummer & Partner and Nomura Holdings. The main part of the placement (SEK 50 million) was done by Ager-Hanssen. He later sold his share in Glocalnet to Inter-Ikea.

Other telecom investments held by Ager-Hanssen included Utfors, a broadband operator today also owned by Telenor, and investments in Tele2 and Millicom.

=== Oil industry ===
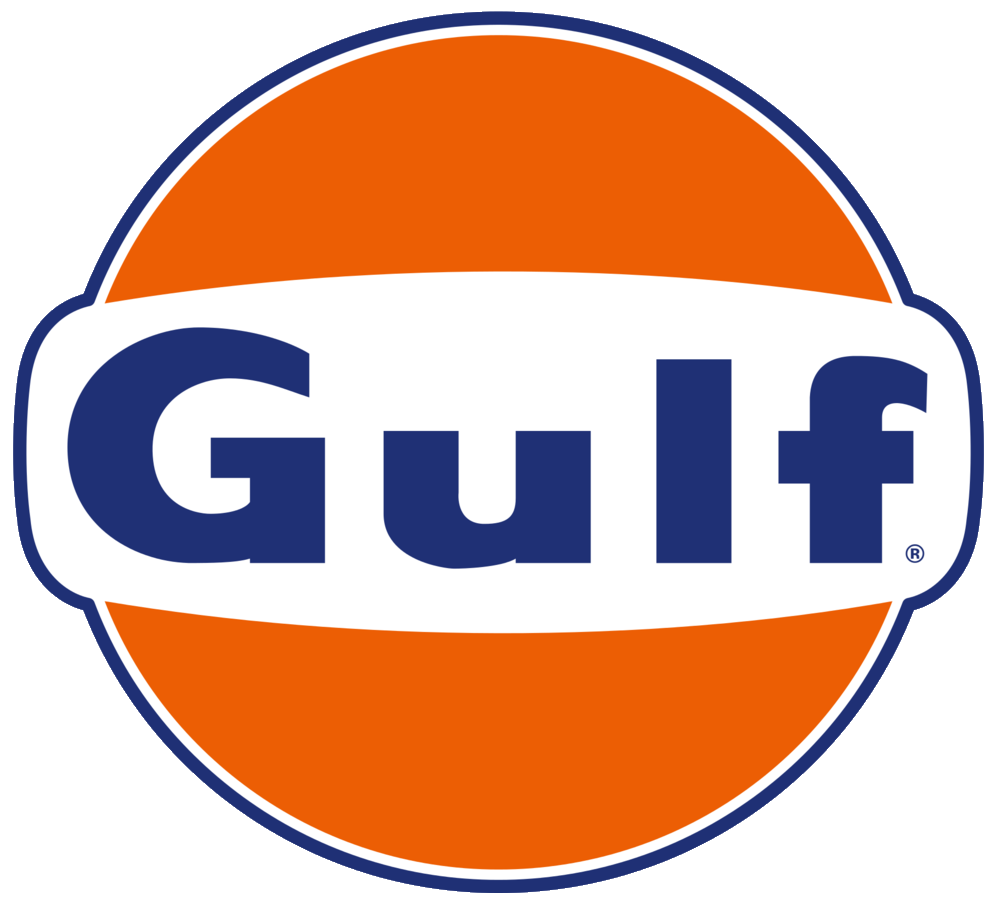
Gulf logo.

Ager-Hanssen invested in 2005 together with Porter in Nordic Oil. The company was chaired by the founder and former CEO of Statoil, Arve Johnsen. The company aimed to expand both upstream and downstream. Some of the assets of the company included 105 gas stations in Sweden- branded pump and a lubricant retail business in Scandinavia. In 2006 Nordic Oil signed a deal with the Hinduja Group to re-establish the Gulf brand to the Scandinavian market and planned to rebrand all of its gas stations. The deal fell through, with the company claiming to never have received payment from Cognition for the gas stations.

In July 2007, Johnsen and auditor Sven Erga resigned, along with half of the board after the company was served with a compulsory dissolution notice. In 2007, the company was forced into bankruptcy.

== Business partners ==
Ager-Hanssen works with blue chip executives, politicians, and billionaires such as John Robert Porter, who had made a fortune from Demon, Britain's first internet provider as well as from his divestment of Verifone to Hewlett Packard in 1997. Ager-Hanssen and Porter have several business interests together and have been business partners since the late 1990s.
