= CargoLogicAir =

British cargo airline

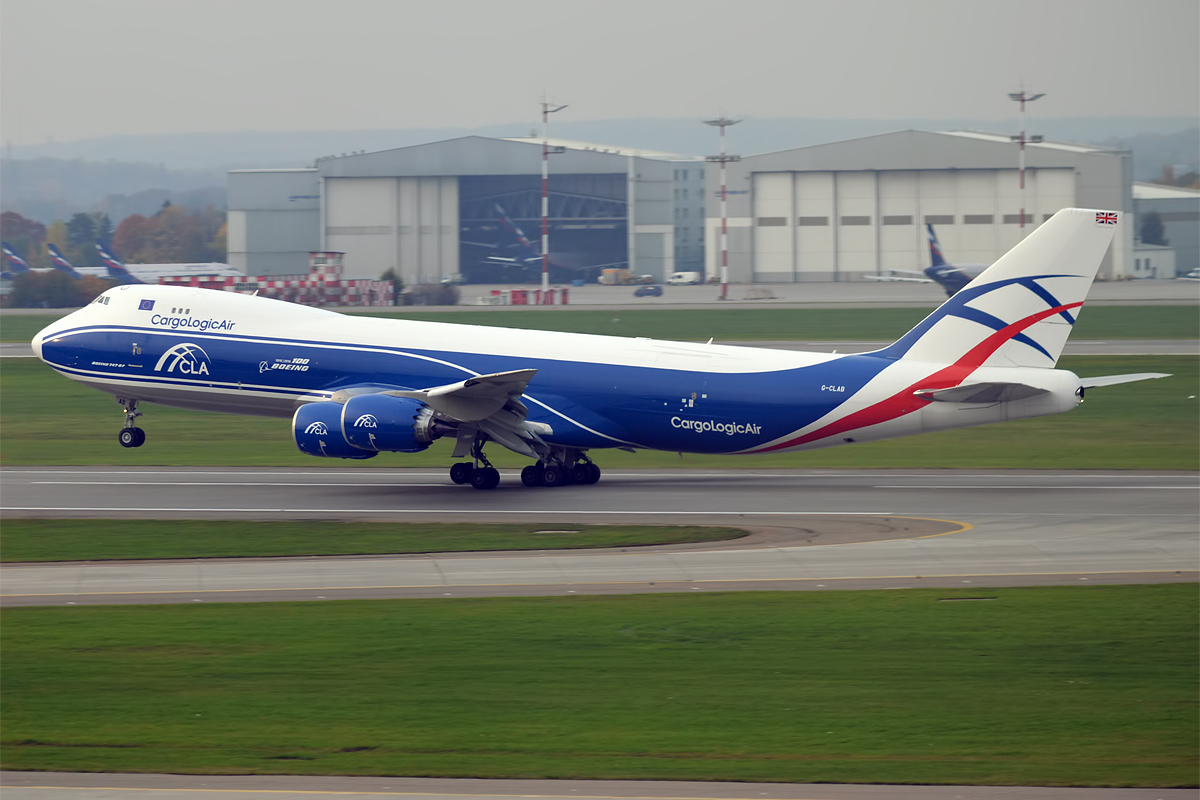
- Boeing 747-8F
IATA	ICAO	Call sign
P3	CLU	FIREBIRD
- Founded: 3 March 2015
- Ceased operations: 27 November 2022
- Focus cities: London East Midlands Airport, UK Frankfurt, Liege, Atlanta, Chicago, Cincinnati, Los Angeles
- Fleet size: 0
- Destinations: 15
- Parent company: Cargologic Holdings EU
- Headquarters: London Heathrow Airport, UK
- Key people: Nadeem Sultan, CEO
- Employees: 200
- Website: www.cargologicair.com

CargoLogicAir, Ltd. (CLA) was a British cargo airline with its headquarters at London Heathrow Airport. The airline's fleet of Boeing 747 freight aircraft operated scheduled and chartered freight services on routes between the UK, Asia, Africa and the Americas. CargoLogicAir ceased operations in November 2022 and went into administration after suspending operations intermittently since 2020.

== History ==
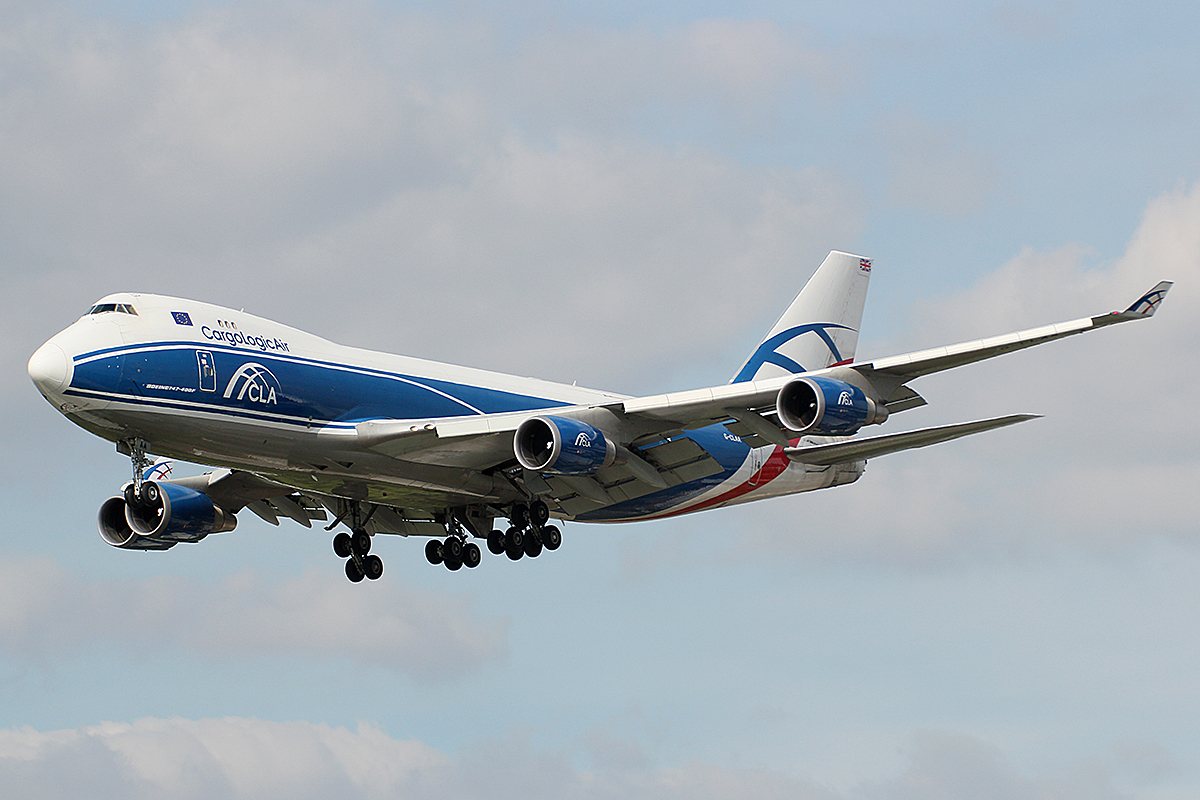
G-CLAA, a Boeing 747-400F, Cargologic's first airplane.

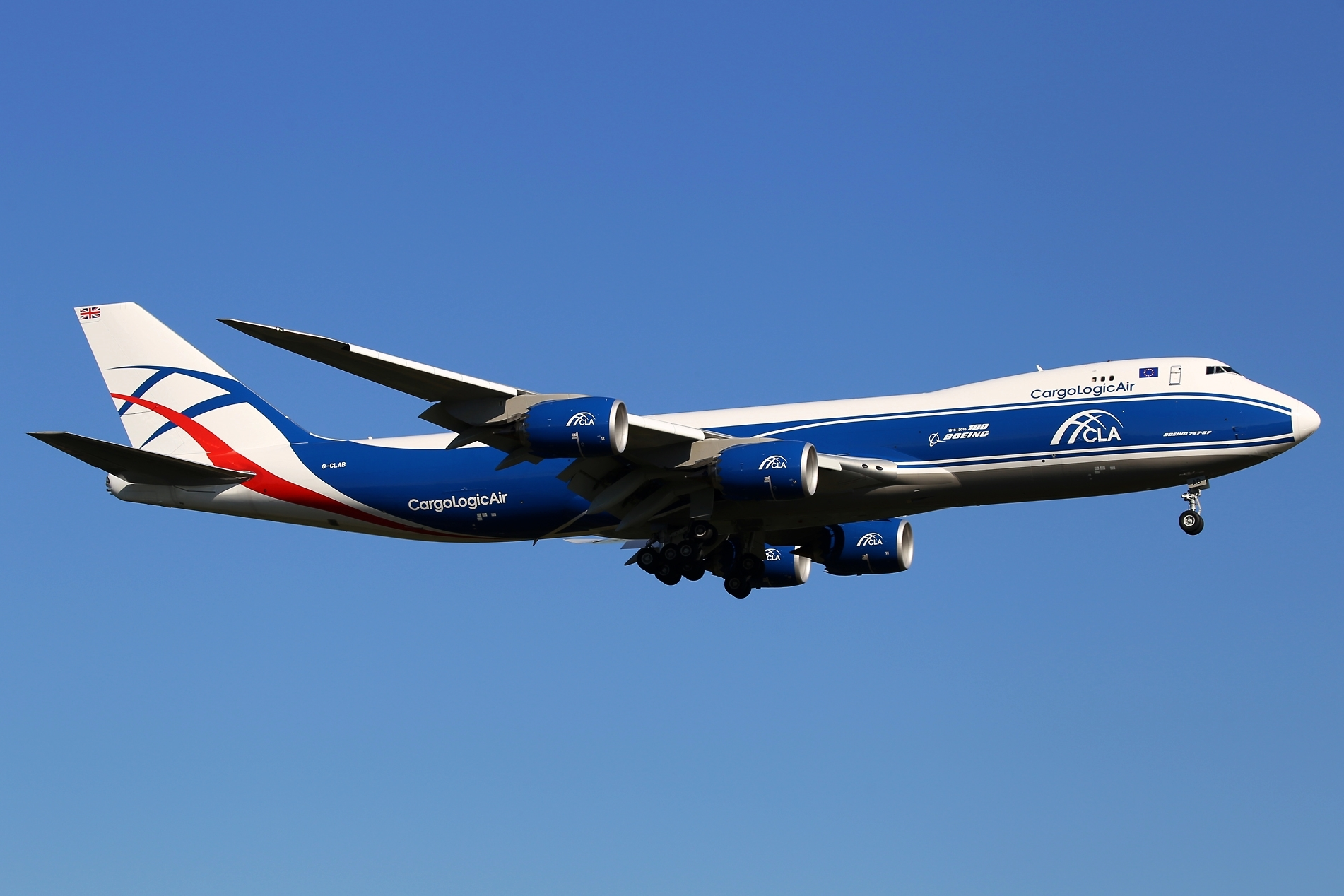
A former CargoLogicAir Boeing 747-8F.

=== Foundation ===
After the Global Supply Systems' contract with British Airways World Cargo was terminated in January 2014, CLA effectively became the only British all-cargo airline, absorbing some of the Global Supply Systems staff. The airline was established on 3 March 2015 and received its first aircraft, a Boeing 747-400F from Aircastle in October of that same year. It received its Air Operator's Certificate (AOC) from the UK Civil Aviation Authority in December 2015 and commenced operations within a few weeks.

Chapman Freeborn Italia became CLA's first charter service customer after contracting them in February 2016 to deliver 113 tonnes of automotive parts to Bari, Italy. CLA initiated its first scheduled services with AirBridgeCargo Airlines (ABC) (of which it was a subsidiary) through an aircraft, crew, maintenance and insurance (ACMI) wet lease. The service flew from the United Kingdom to Africa twice per week, from 14 February 2016 through 30 November.

CLA took hold of its second aircraft and first Boeing 747-8F at the 2016 Farnborough Airshow. This aircraft was used to transport over 100 tonnes of fresh flowers from Bogotá, Colombia to London Stansted Airport for Mother's Day in 2017. Within 18 months of starting operations the airline received a second Boeing 747-400F from AerCap in April 2017. Becoming the third in the fleet, this aircraft flew charter services through an ACMI wet lease agreement for AirBridgeCargo. CLA aimed to eventually have a core fleet of five aircraft. The first scheduled connections began in the following August. In 2019, CLA planned to reduce its operations and restructure in response to weakening market conditions.

=== Demise ===
The airline temporarily suspended services on 9 February 2020 citing a downturn in demand. Their 747-8 and one of their 747-400s were returned to lessors in January 2020. On 9 February, CLA grounded the remainder of their fleet and laid off some of their workforce. On 24 February 2020, the airline announced the termination of all operations until further notice.

However, services recommenced because of the high demand of air freight capacity, plus the downturn of oil prices due to the COVID-19 pandemic. CLA regained its AOC on 22 April 2020 and started immediately with PPE supply flights from China to the UK for the NHS on 23 April 2020. Flights were then operated with their two B747-400 freighters. In July, after six months, as the COO Nadeem Sultan was appointed as the new CEO. Under its new leadership and post restructuring, the company announced a $42 million profit for 2020, its first profit in its history.

In November 2022, CargoLogicAir went into administration and ceased operations for good due to a negative business outlook in the wake of sanctions against Russian owned businesses.ref name=flightglobal.com/>

== Destinations ==
The airline launched its first scheduled operation on 19 August 2017 with twice-weekly services from London Stansted Airport to Mexico City via Atlanta. CargoLogicAir also operated flights from Houston to Prestwick then on to Frankfurt, along with routes to and from Doncaster Sheffield Airport. As of February 2021, the airline continued to operate scheduled services from London Heathrow Airport to Atlanta in addition to a newly-established flight between East Midlands Airport and Cincinnati. This route was operated daily on behalf of DHL with the aircraft based at East Midlands Airport.

== Fleet ==
Prior to its shutdown, the CargoLogicAir fleet consisted of the following aircraft:

CargoLogicAir fleet
Aircraft	In service
Boeing 747-400F	1
Boeing 747-400ERF	1
Total	2
