= FlyMe =

Swedish airline

IATA	ICAO	Call sign
SH	FLY	FLYBIRD
- Founded: 2003
- Commenced operations: 2004
- Ceased operations: 2 March 2007
- Hubs: Göteborg Landvetter Airport
- Focus cities: Malmö Airport; Stockholm-Arlanda Airport
- Fleet size: 6
- Destinations: 25
- Headquarters: Gothenburg, Sweden
- Website: flyme.com

Fly Me Europe AB, operating as FlyMe, was a low-cost airline based in Gothenburg, Sweden. It operated flights from Gothenburg, Stockholm and Malmö to destinations within Europe. Its main hub was Göteborg Landvetter Airport, with hubs at Malmö Airport and Stockholm-Arlanda Airport. Beginning in April 2006, it widened its destination network and started daily services to European destinations. Majority owner of the business was English Billionaire John Robert Porter and his Norwegian business partner Christen Ager-Hanssen. They also had a majority interest in another airline Global Supply Systems a British all cargo carrier. FlyMe acquired in late 2006 a 25% stake in Global Supply Systems holding company Riverdon ltd with the aim to create a low cost long haul product.

The airline ceased operations on 2 March 2007.

== History ==
The airline was founded in 2003 and started operations on 1 March 2004. It employed 104 staff.

On 2 March 2007, FlyMe announced that it would file for bankruptcy due to an unwillingness by its banks to release further funding; this decision was based on proceeds from a rights issue by its parent company. FlyMe accordingly cancelled all its flights.

== Destinations ==
Before its grounding, FlyMe operated to the following destinations:

- Czech Republic
  - Prague (Ruzyně International Airport)
- Finland
  - Helsinki
- France
  - Beauvais (Beauvais-Tillé Airport)
  - Marseille (Marseille Provence Airport)
  - Nice (Nice Côte d'Azur Airport)
- Germany
  - Düsseldorf (Düsseldorf Airport)
- Greece
  - Chania (Chania International Airport)
  - Rhodes (Rhodes International Airport, "Diagoras")
- Italy
  - Bologna (Bologna Airport)
  - Rimini (Federico Fellini International Airport)
  - Rome (Ciampino Airport)
- Netherlands
  - Amsterdam (Schiphol)
- Spain
  - Alicante (Alicante Airport)
  - Barcelona (Barcelona International Airport)
  - Málaga (Málaga Airport)
  - Palma de Mallorca (Son Sant Joan Airport)
- Sweden
  - Gothenburg (Göteborg Landvetter Airport)
  - Helsingborg
  - Luleå (Luleå Airport)
  - Malmö (Malmö Airport)
  - Stockholm (Stockholm-Arlanda Airport)
  - Sundsvall
  - Östersund
- Turkey
  - Istanbul (Sabiha Gökçen International Airport)
- United Kingdom
  - London (London Stansted)

== Fleet ==
The FlyMe fleet consisted of the following aircraft (as of August 2006):

- 5 Boeing 737-300
- 1 Boeing 737-500

== See also ==
- Airlines
- Transport in Sweden
