= Gerrards Rederi =

Norwegian shipping company

Gerrards Rederi A/S (Gerrards Shipping) was a Norwegian shipping company, trading from 1956 to the late 1990s.

== History ==
Gerrards Rederi was established in 1956 when the two joint-stock shipping companies S/A Songdal and S/A Germa were merged.

The shipping company struggled through the shipping crisis of the mid-1970s, but conditions improved during the 1980s. In 1984 the company established the shipping pool Samseilingspoolen Norobo, together with Arnt J. Mørland, Tønnevolds Tankrederi A/S, Ugland Management Co. A/S, and Norse Shipping Company Pty. Ltd. The pool was to consist of 12 modern combined bulk and tank ships.

In 1992, London-based Ugland Brothers acquired the company., and in 1994 its activities were moved from Kristiansand, Norway, to London. The company appears to have ceased trading around 1997.

In 1999, Gerrards Rederi was for several months the object of intense media attention related to the Pickupcat controversy, in which Pickupcat management had given inaccurate information about the negotiations between the companies, and had thus led the stock market to believe that Gerrards Rederi had agreed to invest NOK 10 million in the maritime technology company.

== Vessels ==
- MS Gerore
- MS Gerina
- MT Georgia
