= IAG Cargo =

Company

- Industry: Cargo
- Predecessor: Aer Lingus Cargo; British Airways World Cargo; Iberia Cargo
- Founded: April 2011; 15 years ago
- Headquarters: London
- Key people: David Shepherd (CEO)
- Parent: International Airlines Group
- Website: iagcargo.com

IAG Cargo is the cargo handling division of International Airlines Group (IAG). IAG Cargo uses the freight capacity of its sister airlines' passenger flights, which include British Airways, Iberia, Aer Lingus, Vueling, and Level. The division maintains three hubs located at Dublin Airport, Heathrow Airport and Adolfo Suárez Madrid–Barajas Airport. IAG Cargo provides freight transportation with over 15,000 flights a week to more than 350 destinations in over 80 countries through its affiliated passenger network of 5 airlines.

== Operations ==
The freight services of British Airways World Cargo were provided using the main British Airways fleet. BA World Cargo also operated freighter aircraft under a wet lease agreement with Global Supply Systems until 2014. The freight services of Aer Lingus Cargo and Iberia Cargo were provided using the entire fleet of both respective airlines. The company was formed in April 2011 by the merger of British Airways World Cargo and Iberia Cargo. BMI Cargo was also integrated into the business following IAG's purchase of British Midland International in April 2012. Cargo operations associated with Aer Lingus services were similarly integrated in 2016, following IAG's acquisition of the airline. In 2012 the operations of British Airways World Cargo and Iberia Cargo had joint turnover of €1,217 million. They have a combined workforce of more than 2,400 people covering a global network of over 350 destinations.

IAG Cargo's hub in London was built in 1999 for the entry, transit and exit of international cargo shipments. The campus is centered on two facilities consisting of over 90,000 sq. metres of space and a capacity of 800,000 tonnes a year. IAG Cargo's hub in Madrid was originally built for Iberia Cargo in 1994 for the entry, transit and exit of international cargo shipments. It features over 20,000 sq. metres of space.
