= Pickupcat =

Norwegian shipbuilding company

PickUpCat was a Norwegian company established in 1996. The company was based on a module-based concept invented by Norwegian marine engineer Dag O. Aavitsland. The concept implied that ships should be built in two detachable modules so that the motor module and the cargo module could be separated.

== Economic problems and misleading information ==
In September 1998 the company's CEO sent misleading information to stock holders indicating that the company had signed a contract that would produce significant license income. According to the CEO's message, 6 motor units and 18 cargo units for chemical tankers were to be constructed, and this would produce significant income for the company, starting at the end of that year. The contract partner was identified as Venture Management Group Ltd in the UK. Over the next two days the price of Pickupcat stocks increased by 50%. The value of PickUpCat's stocks peaked at NOK 130, the company's value thus peaking at NOK 600m (USD 80m).

In October 1998, the JJ Ugland group sold its shares in Pickupcat, and the company head, Øivind O. Larsen, withdrew from Pickupcat's board. Leif Hoegh & Co also sold their shares that year.

Between December 1998 and April 1999, the CEO repeatedly informed that the shipping company Gerrards Rederi in Kristiansand, Norway, would invest in the company, and that contract had been signed. In the company's annual report for 1998, dated March 22, 1999, Pickupcat still maintained that a contract with Gerrards Rederi existed, and that Pickupcat's negative balance was a result of the failure of Gerrards Rederi to meet its obligations, when in fact no such contract had been signed.

According to the Norwegian business newspaper Dagens Næringsliv, a memo written for Pickupcat by lawyer Ronny Mulstad in January 1999 furthermore indicated that there were plans to sell stocks to Monaco-based French businessman Michel Batis to an artificially high price of NOK 125 per share. In April 1999 Pickupcat's stocks were traded for NOK 20 per share.

In April 1999, Pickupcat management were in Spain to negotiate with a shipyard.

== Investigation and trial ==
The Financial Supervisory Authority of Norway notified the Norwegian National Authority for Investigation and Prosecution of Economic and Environmental Crime (ØKOKRIM). This latter initiated in March 1999 investigation of PickUpCat's CEO and its former chairman Arve Johnsen, and subsequently charged PickUpCat's CEO with fraud. In April 1999, CEO Aavitsland was forced to resign because of the investigation.

The charge against Pickupcat's CEO was double: In addition to the charge of misinformation related to the alleged contract with Venture Management Group Ltd., he was also charged for providing misleading information about negotiations between Pickupcat and Gerrards Rederi.

Practical problems with securing evidence in the UK hampered the investigation. Difficulties also arose from the fact that the former CEO had emigrated to France. In 2005, however, the former CEO was extradited to Norway.

The founder and former CEO Aavitsland was convicted to seven months imprisonment for having mislead the company's stock holders. The charges against former chairman Arve Johnsen were dropped. He had not been aware that contracts had not been signed.
