= Henrik Ager-Hanssen =

Norwegian nuclear physicist (1930–2004)

Henrik Julius Ager-Hanssen
- Born: July 21, 1930; Stavanger, Norway
- Died: November 17, 2004 (aged 74); Stavanger, Norway
- Education: University of Oslo; University of Leuven; New York University
- Occupations: Nuclear physicist; Entrepreneur
- Spouse: Bjørg Ager-Hanssen

Signature
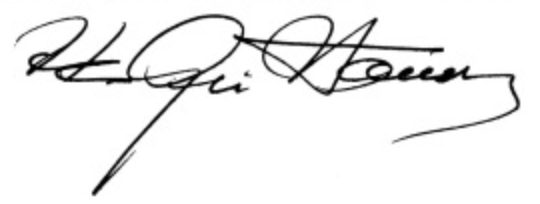

Henrik Julius Ager-Hanssen (21 July 1930 – 19 November 2004) was a Norwegian nuclear physicist and businessperson. He spent his career in the nuclear energy sector from 1956 to 1975, then in the petroleum company Statoil from 1976 to 1998.

== Career ==
He was born in Stavanger, and after education at the University of Oslo, University of Leuven and New York University he got the degree Master of Nuclear Engineering. He taught nuclear energy technology at the New York University from 1956 to 1957, and then spent many years as a researcher, research leader and director at the Institute for Energy Technology. He spent his four last years in nuclear energy as chief executive of Scandpower from 1971 to 1975.

In 1976 Ager-Hanssen was hired as vice chief executive of the petroleum company Statoil, based in his hometown Stavanger. He was reportedly headhunted by Finn Lied. In 1988 he briefly served as the acting chief executive, following the retirement of Arve Johnsen. From autumn 1989 he was a special adviser in the company, with special responsibility for its Brussels branch. In 1998 he founded his own consulting firm Ager Energy Management.

Internationally, Ager-Hanssen chaired the Committee for Special Studies and the Energy for Tomorrow's World Commission, both within the World Energy Council. In 1994 he was named on the European Commission's Consultative Forum on environmental policy, despite Norway not being an EU member. He has served as chair of Norsk Helikopter, Stavanger Aftenblad, ONS, EnTech Invest, Scan Geophysical, Kongsberg Våpenfabrikk, the Institute for Energy Technology, the Center for International Climate and Environmental Research and Det Stavangerske Dampskibsselskab. He has been a board member of Det Norske Veritas, the Chr. Michelsen Institute and Siemens Norway.

He was an elected fellow of the Norwegian Academy of Science and Letters, the Norwegian Academy of Technological Sciences, the Royal Swedish Academy of Engineering Sciences and the National Academy of Engineering.

== Personal life ==
He married Bjørg Ager-Hanssen in 1958 and had two children, Marianne and Christen Ager-Hanssen. He died from cancer in November 2004.

Business positions
Preceded by Arve Johnsen	Chief executive of Statoil; 1988 (acting)	Succeeded by Harald Norvik
