= British Airways World Cargo =

Defunct cargo airline of the United Kingdom (1999–2014)

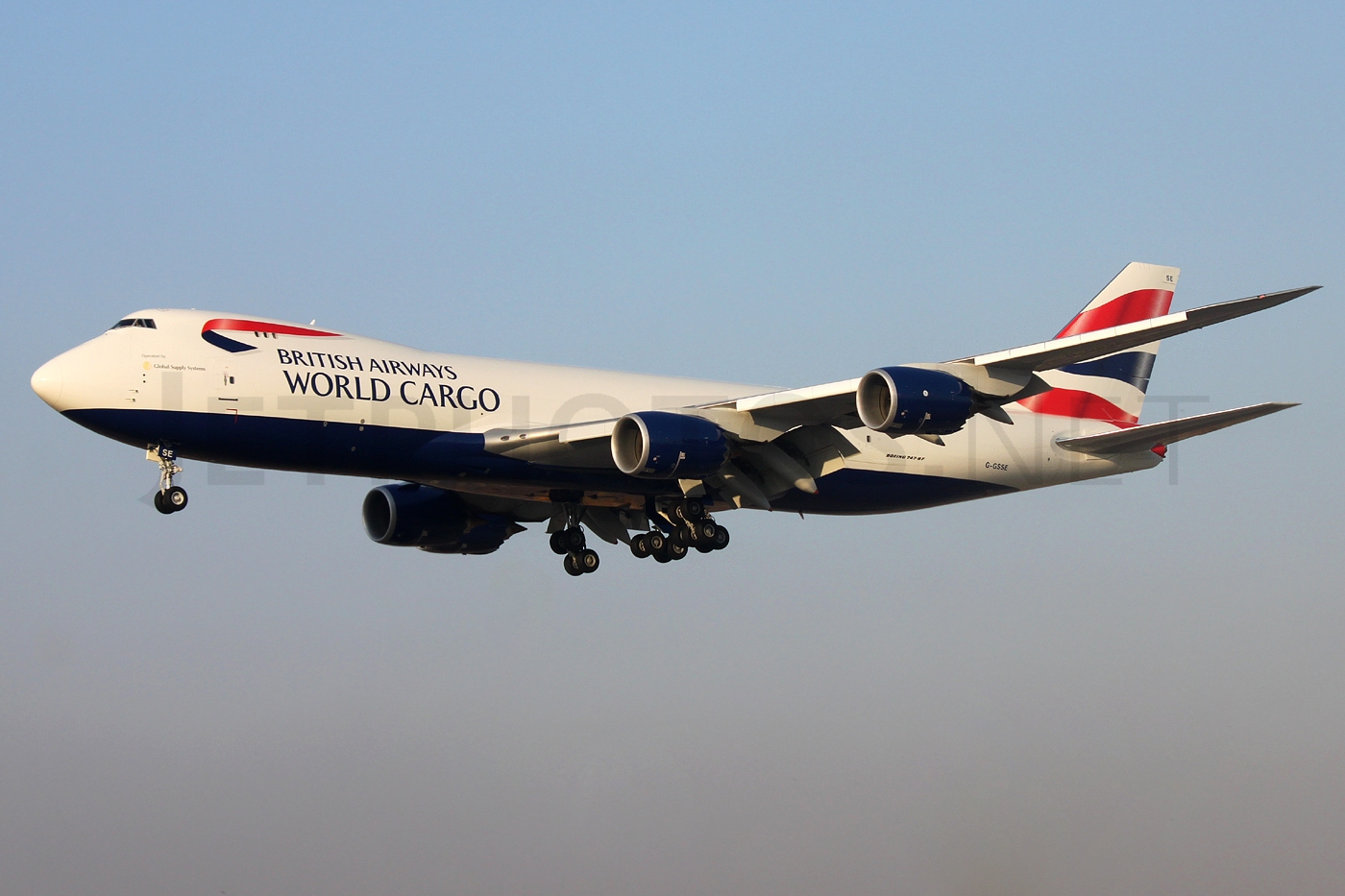
- Boeing 747-8F
IATA	ICAO	Call sign
BA	—	—
- Commenced operations: May 1999
- Ceased operations: 1 May 2014
- Hubs: London Stansted Airport
- Fleet size: 3
- Parent company: IAG Cargo
- Headquarters: London, England, United Kingdom

British Airways World Cargo, formerly British Airways Cargo, was a division of IAG Cargo, operating air cargo services under the British Airways brand. It was the twelfth-largest cargo airline in the world by total freight tonne-kilometres flown. Freight services were provided using the main British Airways fleet, as well as dedicated freighter aircraft operating under a wet lease agreement with Global Supply Systems.

== History ==
British Airways first opened a World Cargo centre at Heathrow in the late 1990s; it was an automated freight handling centre capable of handling unusual and premium cargo, and fresh produce, of which it handled over 80,000 tons per year. BA World Cargo also handled freight at London's Gatwick and Stansted airports, and, through its partner British Airways Regional Cargo, at all of the main regional airports throughout the UK.

The company ended operations on 30 April 2014, having been fully merged into IAG Cargo, however without continuing dedicated cargo flights. BA World Cargo also operated an automated cargo centre at London Heathrow Airport, and had a base for long-haul freighter services at London Stansted Airport.

Following the shuttering of British Airways World Cargo, a new all-cargo airline, CargoLogicAir, commenced operations in 2015, receiving some staff from Global Supply Systems.

== Destinations ==
BA World Cargo operated dedicated freighter aircraft services to Africa, the Middle East, the Indian Subcontinent, East Asia, North America and Europe from their London-Stansted base. BA World Cargo operates using the main BA fleet. Until the end of March 2014, they also operated three Boeing 747-8 freighter aircraft providing dedicated long-haul services under a wet lease arrangement from Global Supply Systems.

== Fleet ==
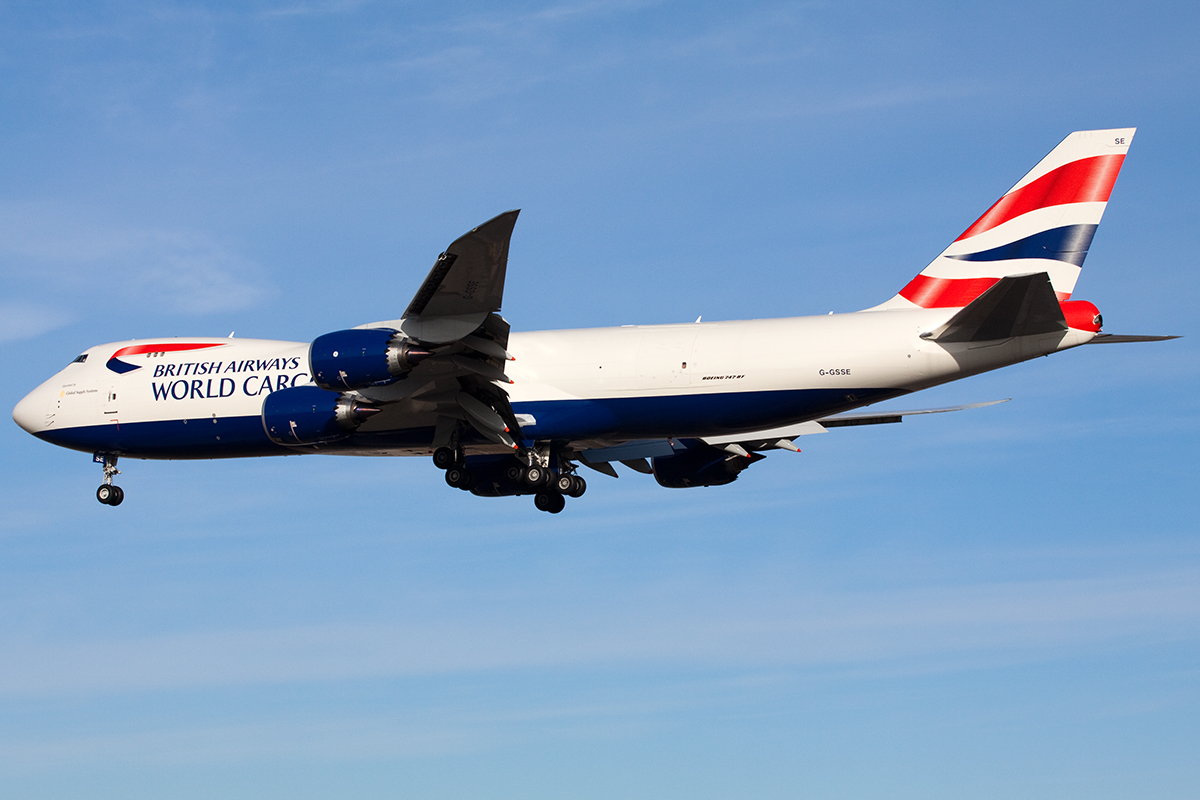
Boeing 747-8F

BA World Cargo fleet as of April 2014 consisted of:

- Boeing 747-8F (total of 3 were wet-leased from Global Supply Systems and phased out gradually)

BA World Cargo also used space on dedicated freighters operated by other carriers.

Previously operated

- Boeing 707-320C
- Boeing 747-200F
- Boeing 747-400F
- Vickers 953c Merchantman

== See also ==
- List of defunct airlines of the United Kingdom
