= Harald Norvik =

Norwegian businessman

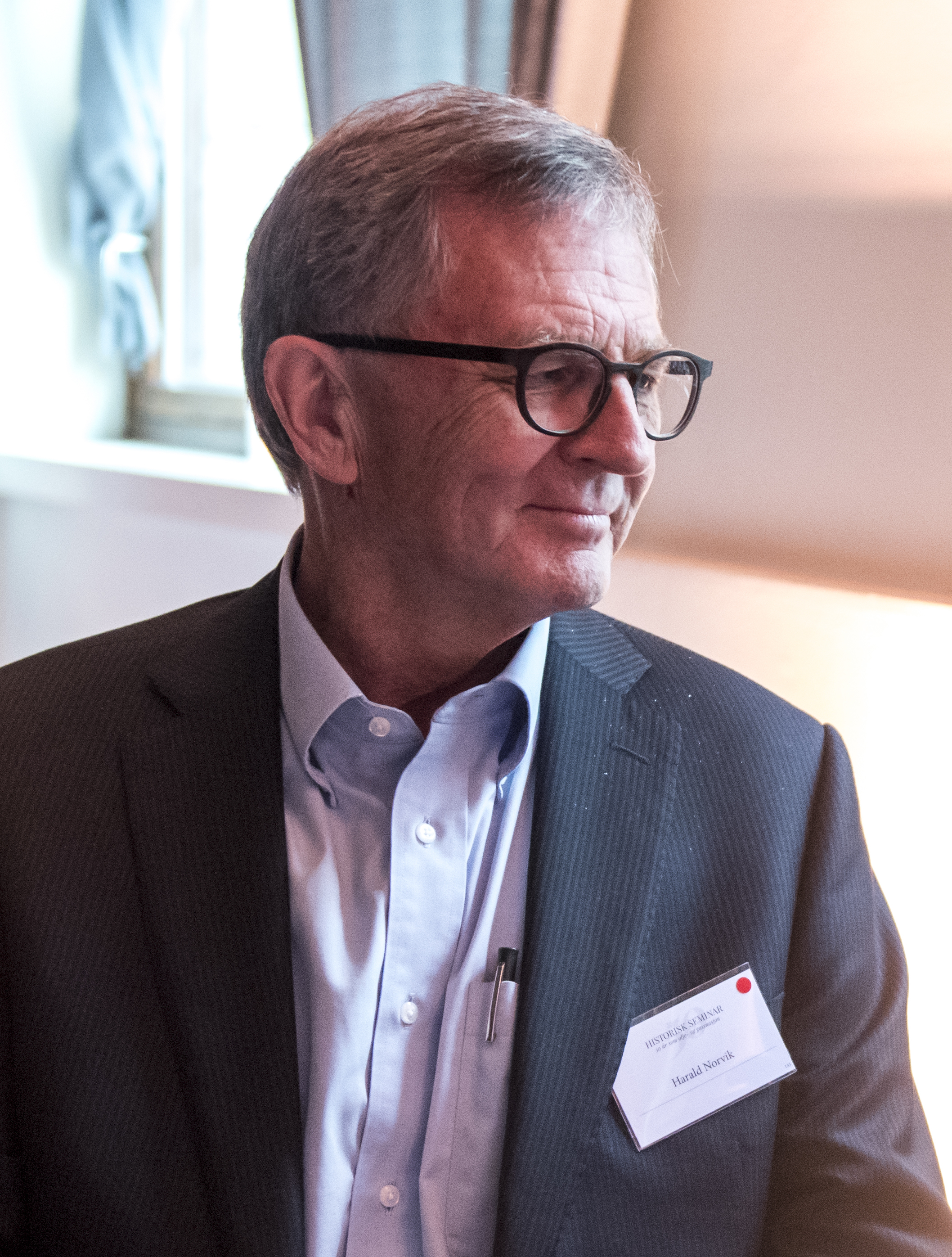
Harald Norvik

Harald Norvik (born 21 June 1946 in Vadsø) is a former chairman, president, and chief executive of Norwegian oil firm Statoil, a former chairman of telecommunications company Telenor and a director of ConocoPhillips.

Norvik received his Master of Science Degree in Business from the Norwegian School of Economics. Between 1979 and 1981 he served as personal secretary to the Prime Minister of Norway, Odvar Nordli, and also as State Secretary in the Ministry of Petroleum and Energy. From 1981 to 1988 he was finance director and a member of the board at Aker. He served as Statoil President and CEO from 1988 to 1999. He is currently a strategic advisor of ECON and has been a partner of ECON from 2001. He is Chairman of the Board of Aschehoug, member of the board of Petroleum Geo-Services and Chairman of OCAS.

Harald Norvik has attended the Bilderberg Meeting in 2006 in Ottawa, Canada. He is a fellow of the Norwegian Academy of Technological Sciences.

In 2016, Norvik published the book, ‘The government as Capitalist’, together with former CEO of Hydro Egil Myklebust and history professor Einar Lie. The book discusses how government ownership in Norwegian businesses is larger than in other countries, and that the government-owned companies are very large compared to the rest of the economy.

Business positions
Preceded by Henrik Ager-Hanssen	Chief executive of Statoil; 1988–1999	Succeeded by Olav Fjell
