= Shipping pool =

Group of merchant vessels that are grouped together for administrative purposes

A shipping pool is a group of similar merchant vessels that are grouped together for administrative purposes. Their earnings are pooled and distributed to the vessel owners according to a prearranged agreement.

== Shipping pools ==
- A/S Bulkhandling (established during the 1960s)
- NOROBO (established 1984)
- NPC/Norwegian Pipecarriers (established 1989)

== Shipping pools in various ship types ==
Shipping pools are very popular among tanker vessels but not so much in dry bulk vessels.
