= Glocalnet =

Glocalnet was a Swedish Internet service provider owned by Telenor.

It was merged into Bredbandsbolaget which was later merged into Telenor Sverige.
