= Arve Johnsen =

Norwegian politician (1934–2023)

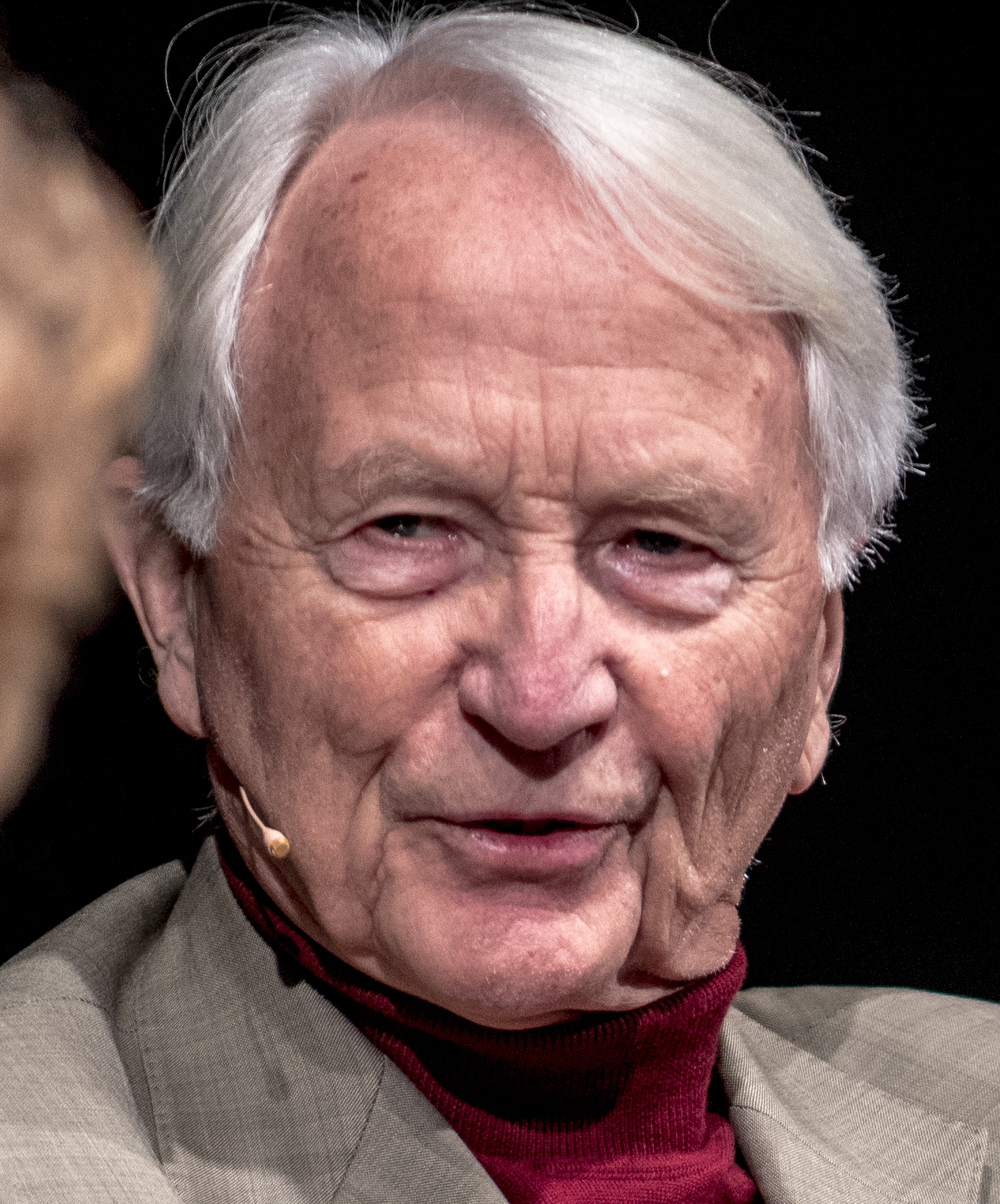
Johnsen in 2016

Arve Johnsen (18 February 1934 – 6 December 2023) was a Norwegian industrial executive and politician.

== Biography ==
Arve Johnsen was born on 18 February 1934. He was educated in business administration with the degree siviløkonom from the Norwegian School of Economics and Business Administration in 1957 and in law with the degree cand.jur. from the University of Oslo in 1960.

Johnsen was active in the Norwegian Labour Party and was appointed State Secretary to the Minister of Industry during the first cabinet Bratteli early in the 1970s.

Johnsen was the first Chief Executive Officer of Statoil from the company founded in 1972. He was forced to withdraw in 1987 due to the Mongstad scandal.

Johnsen was a fellow of the Norwegian Academy of Technological Sciences.

Johnsen died on 6 December 2023, at the age of 89.

Business positions
Preceded by position created	Chief executive of Statoil; 1972–1987	Succeeded by Henrik Ager-Hanssen
Preceded by	Chairman of Pickupcat –1998	Succeeded by Birger Nilsen
