= Cargo airline =

Airline specializing in transporting air freight

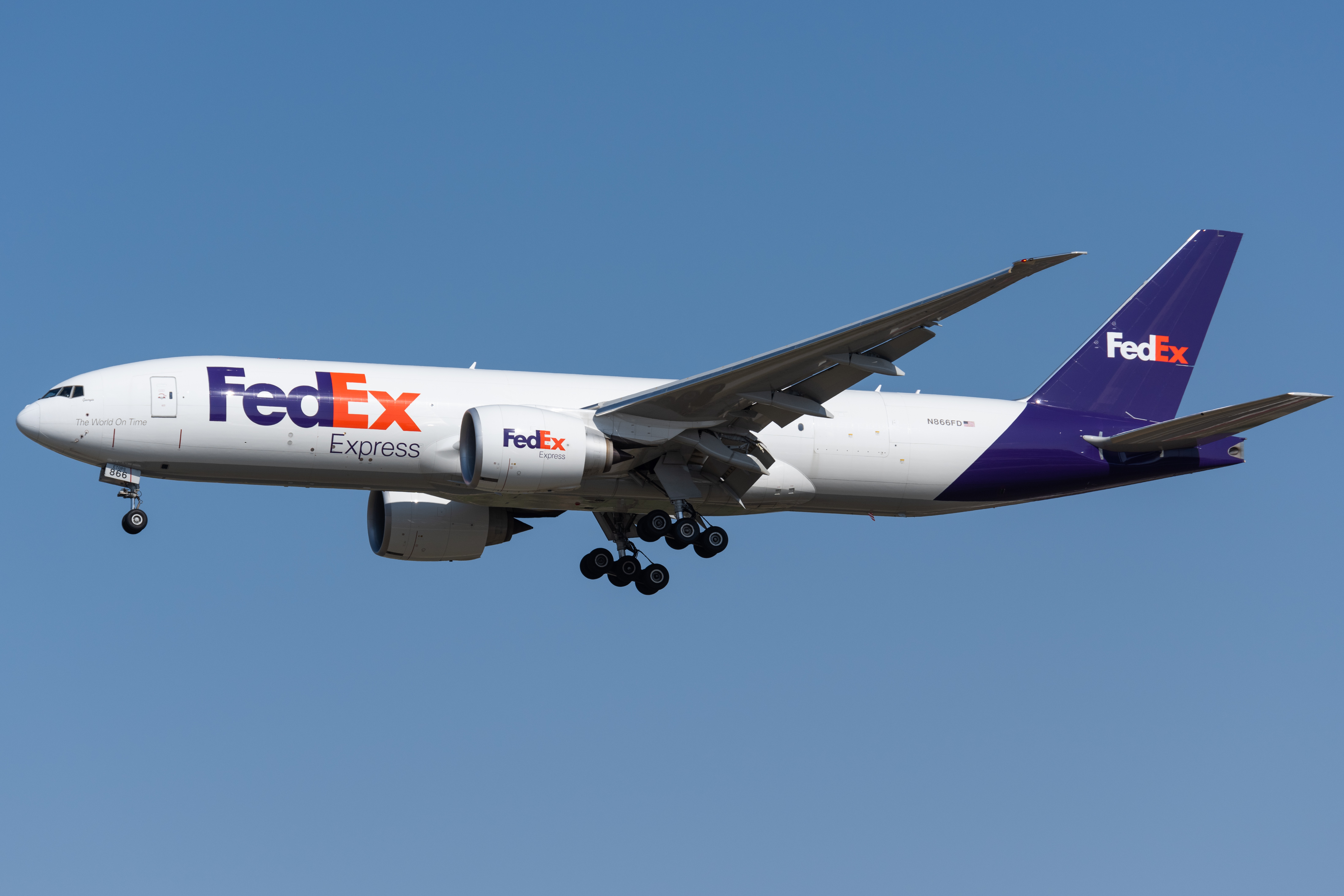
A Boeing 777F of FedEx Express, which is the largest cargo airline in the world.

Unit load device LD3 containers being loaded into the belly cargo hold of a Boeing 777-300ER passenger aircraft

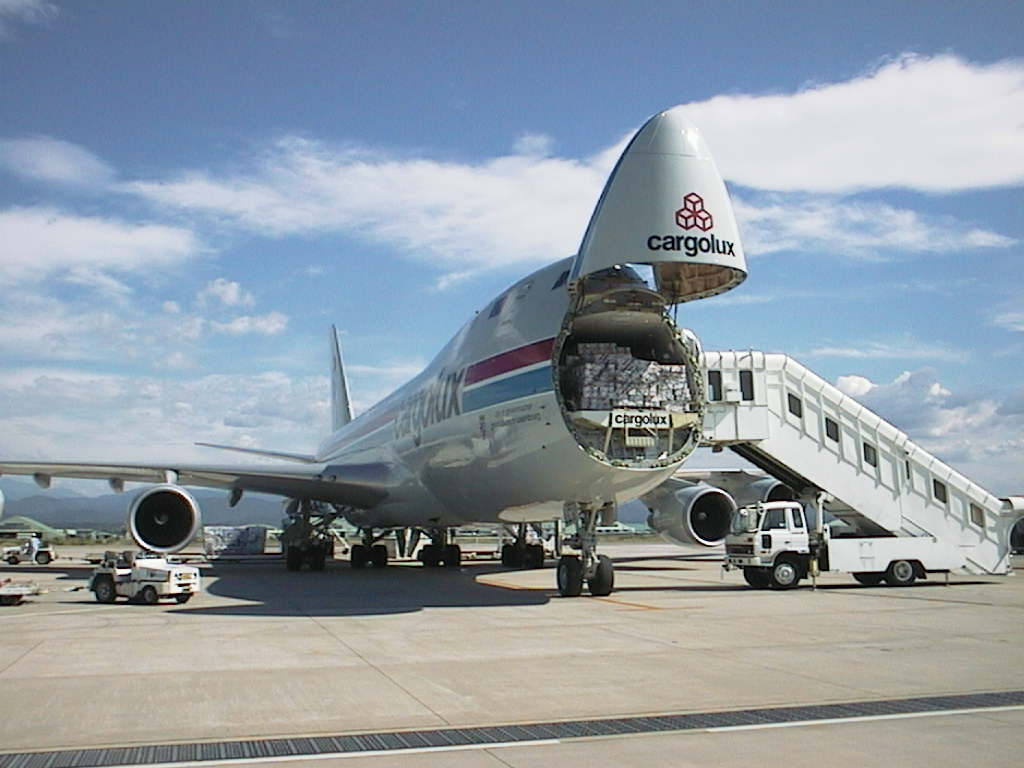
A Boeing 747-400F of Cargolux

Cargo airlines (or air freight carriers, and derivatives of these names) are airlines mainly dedicated to the transport of cargo by air. Some cargo airlines are divisions or subsidiaries of larger passenger airlines. In 2018, air cargo traffic represented 262,333 million tonne-kilometres with a 49.3% load factor: 52.1% for dedicated cargo operations and 47.9% within mixed operations (belly freight of passenger airliners).

Dedicated cargo airlines such as FedEx, UPS, and DHL, operate a fleet of cargo aircraft and handle the entire freight transportation process. Many airlines, like Emirates and Qatar Airways, have dedicated cargo divisions that operate their own fleet of cargo aircraft alongside their passenger operations. During the COVID-19 pandemic, airlines like American Airlines, Air Canada, and Delta Air Lines utilized their passenger planes, removing seats to create space for cargo, to meet the demand for freight transport.

== Pilots ==
A higher proportion of cargo flights are red-eye (overnight flights) than passenger flights. Compared to passenger airline pilots, cargo pilots are paid less but do not have to be responsible for passengers. Cargo pilots also have better job security due to air freight demand being more stable, as opposed to passenger airlines which often furlough their pilots in response to falling passenger demand.

== Freight rates ==
Air freight offers the fastest way to move cargo across long distances.

Amid the COVID-19 pandemic, adjusted cargo capacity fell by 4.4% in February while air cargo demand also fell by 9.1%, but the near-halt in passenger traffic cut capacity even deeper as half of global air cargo is carried in passenger jets' bellies. Air freight rates rose as a consequence, from $0.80 per kg for transatlantic cargoes to $2.50-4 per kg, enticing passenger airlines to operate cargo-only flights through the use of preighters, while cargo airlines bring back into service fuel-guzzling stored aircraft, helped by falling oil prices.

== Logistics ==
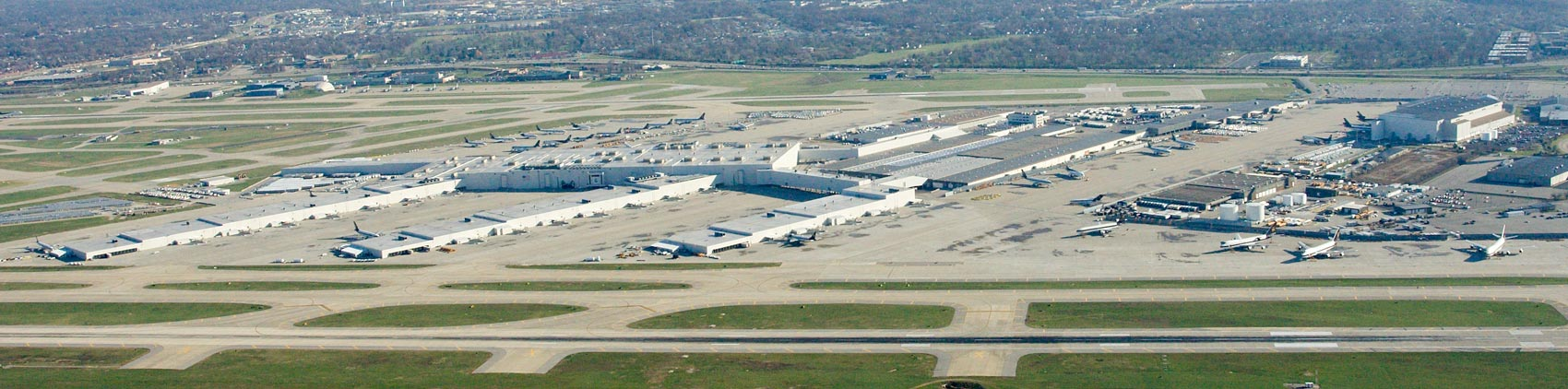
UPS hub at Louisville International Airport

Air transport is a component of many international logistics networks, helping to manage and control the flow of goods, energy, information and other resources from the source of production to the marketplace. Logistics involves the geographical repositioning of raw materials, work in process, and finished inventories.

== Aircraft used ==
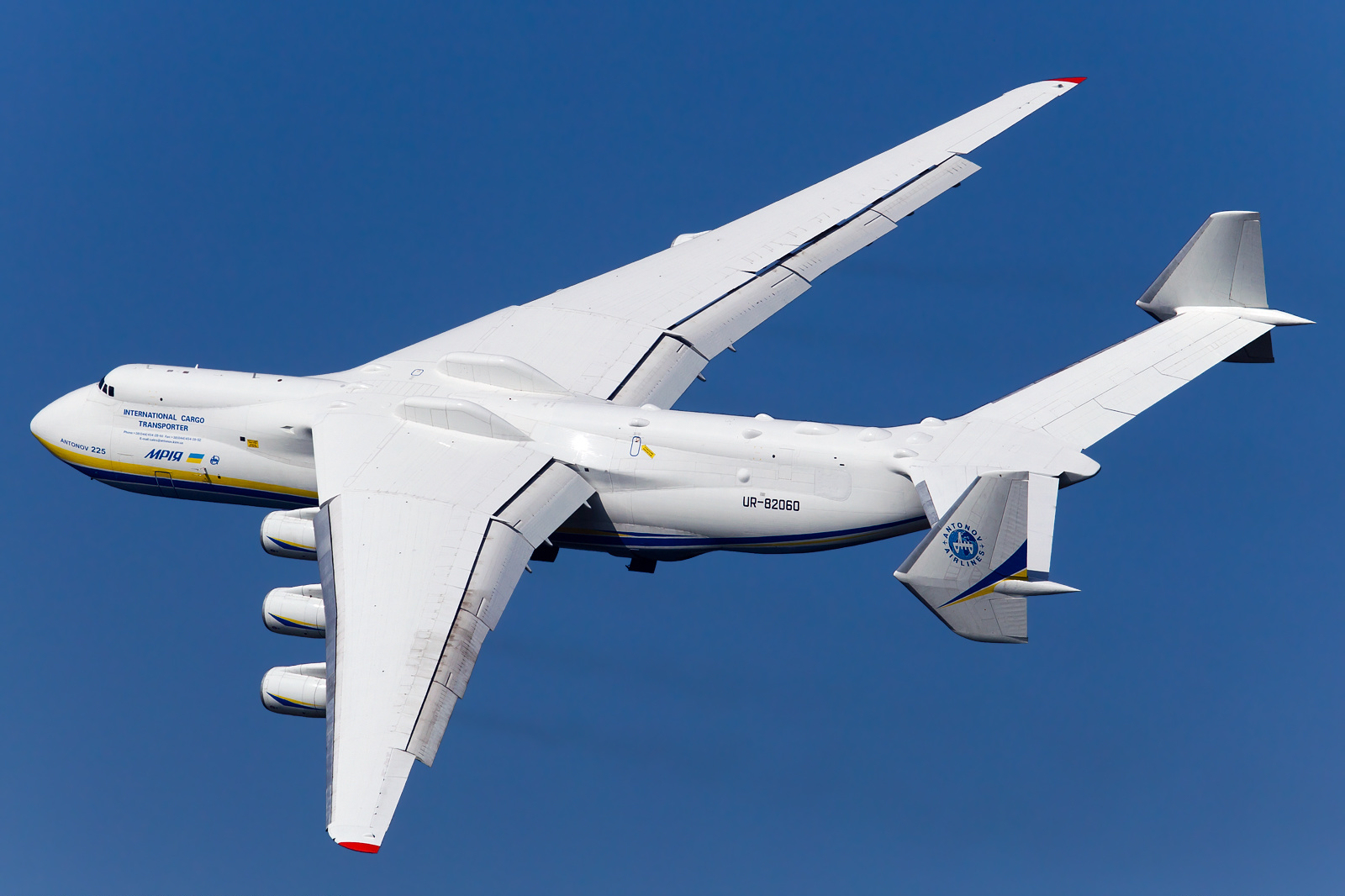
The Antonov An-225, formerly the world's largest aircraft, used by Antonov Airlines before its destruction in the Russo-Ukrainian War

Larger cargo airlines tend to use new or recently built aircraft to carry their freight. Current passenger aircraft such as the Boeing 777 and Airbus A330 offer freighter variants either new from the factory or as a conversion. Compared to the passenger variant, the freighter has a supernumerary area, which includes four business-class seats forward of the rigid cargo barrier, full main deck access, bunks, and a galley. Passenger planes converted to freighters have their windows plugged, passenger doors deactivated, fuselage and floor reinforced, and a main-deck cargo door installed.

Many cargo airlines still utilize older aircraft, including those no longer suited for passenger service, like the Boeing 727, Douglas DC-8, McDonnell Douglas DC-10, McDonnell Douglas MD-11, Airbus A300, and the Ilyushin Il-76. Examples of the Douglas DC-3 are still flying around the world carrying cargo, as well as passengers. Short range turboprop airliners such as the Antonov An-12, Antonov An-26, Fokker Friendship, and British Aerospace ATP are being modified to accept standard air freight pallets to extend their working lives. This normally involves the replacement of glazed windows with opaque panels, the strengthening of the cabin floor and insertion of a broad top-hinged door in one side of the fuselage.

The Antonov An-225 Mriya, an enlarged version of the Antonov An-124 Ruslan, was the world's largest aircraft, used for transporting large shipments and oversized cargos.

Usage of large military airplanes for commercial purposes, pioneered by Ukraine's Antonov Airlines in the 1990s, has allowed new types of cargo in aerial transportation.

=== Passenger and cargo ===
In the past, some cargo airlines would carry a few passengers from time to time on flights, and UPS Airlines once unsuccessfully tried a passenger charter airline division.

Passenger airlines regularly use their largest passenger aircraft like the Boeing 777-300 to earn additional revenue beyond passengers on a scheduled flight, by transporting a limited amount of cargo alongside passengers' luggage underneath the passenger cabin. This is known as mixed operations or belly freight, and makes up 47.9% airline cargo traffic as of 2018. Alaska Airlines operates a series of short flights nicknamed the "Milk Run" to small towns in Southeast Alaska that do not have road access, using five Boeing 737-400 Combi aircraft whose cabin is divided in half with cargo up front and 72 seats in the back.

Low-cost carriers do not tend to operate cargo subsidiaries.

== Types of cargo airlines ==
Several airlines dominate the sector.

=== Top 10 cargo carriers in ctk (m) ===
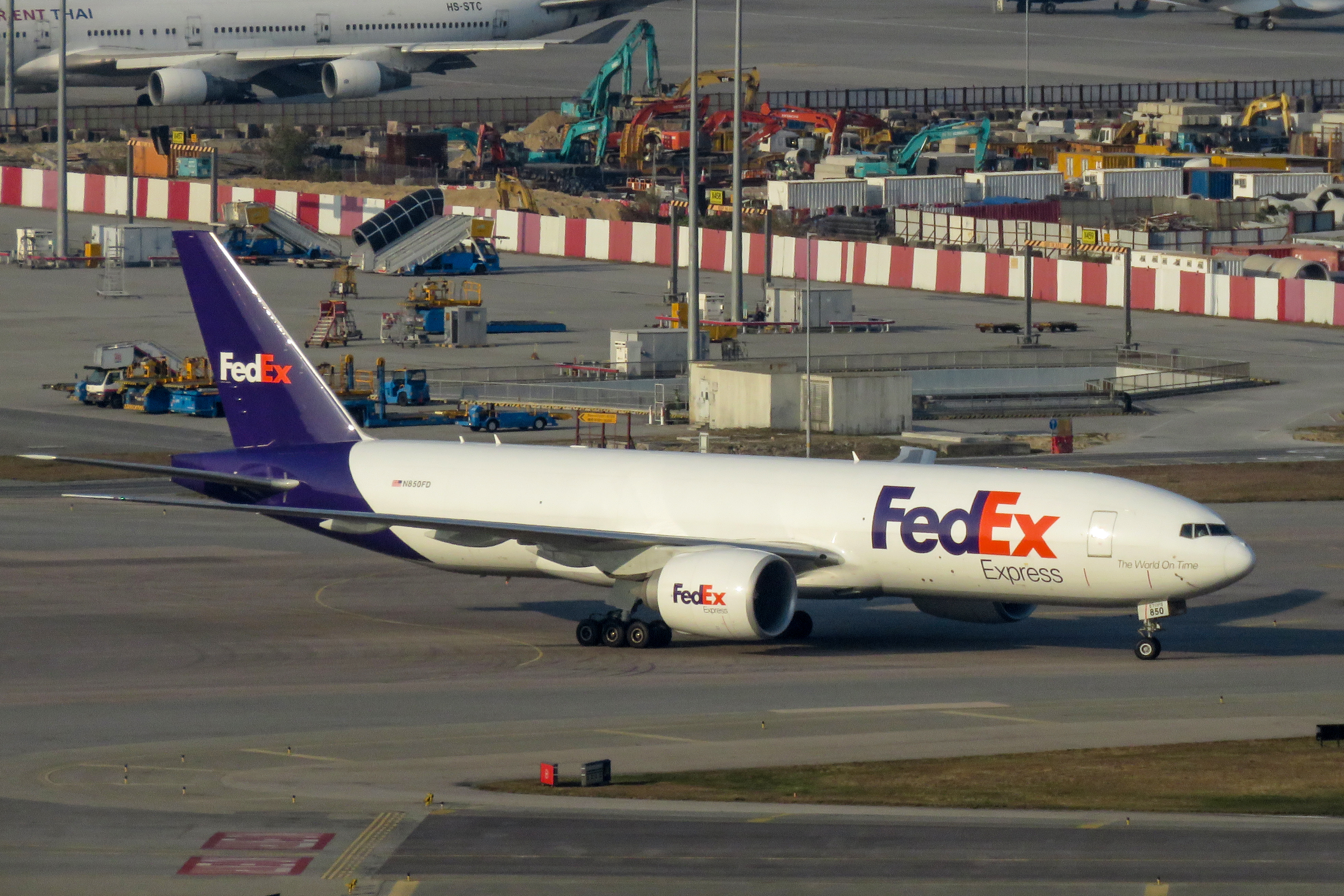
FedEx Express, the largest airline by freight tonne-kilometres flown

Rank	Airline	Country or territory	2024	2023	2022	2021	2020	2019	2018
1	FedEx Express	United States	18,133	17,923	19,547	20,660	19,656	17,503	17,499
2	Qatar Airways Cargo	Qatar	15,211	14,406	14,267	16,102	13,740	13,024	12,695
3	UPS Airlines	United States	15,094	14,239	15,889	15,529	14,371	12,842	12,459
4	Emirates SkyCargo	United Arab Emirates	12,354	10,636	10,153	11,842	9,569	12,052	12,713
5	Atlas Air	United States	11,942	8,915	8,675	8,441	5,458 #12	4,522 #16	4,553 #16
6	Korean Air Cargo	South Korea	8,728	8,411	9,518	10,429	8,104	7,412	7,839
7	Turkish Cargo	Turkey	10,240	8,325	8,318	9,223	6,977	7,029	5,890
8	Cathay Pacific Cargo	Hong Kong	8,503	8,099	5,774 #13	8,215	8,137	10,930	11,284
9	China Southern Airlines Cargo	China	8,653	7,610	6,915	8,078	6,591	6,825	6,597
10	Cargolux	Luxembourg	8,263	6,807	7,971	8,587	7,345	7,180	7,322

=== Largest cargo carriers ===
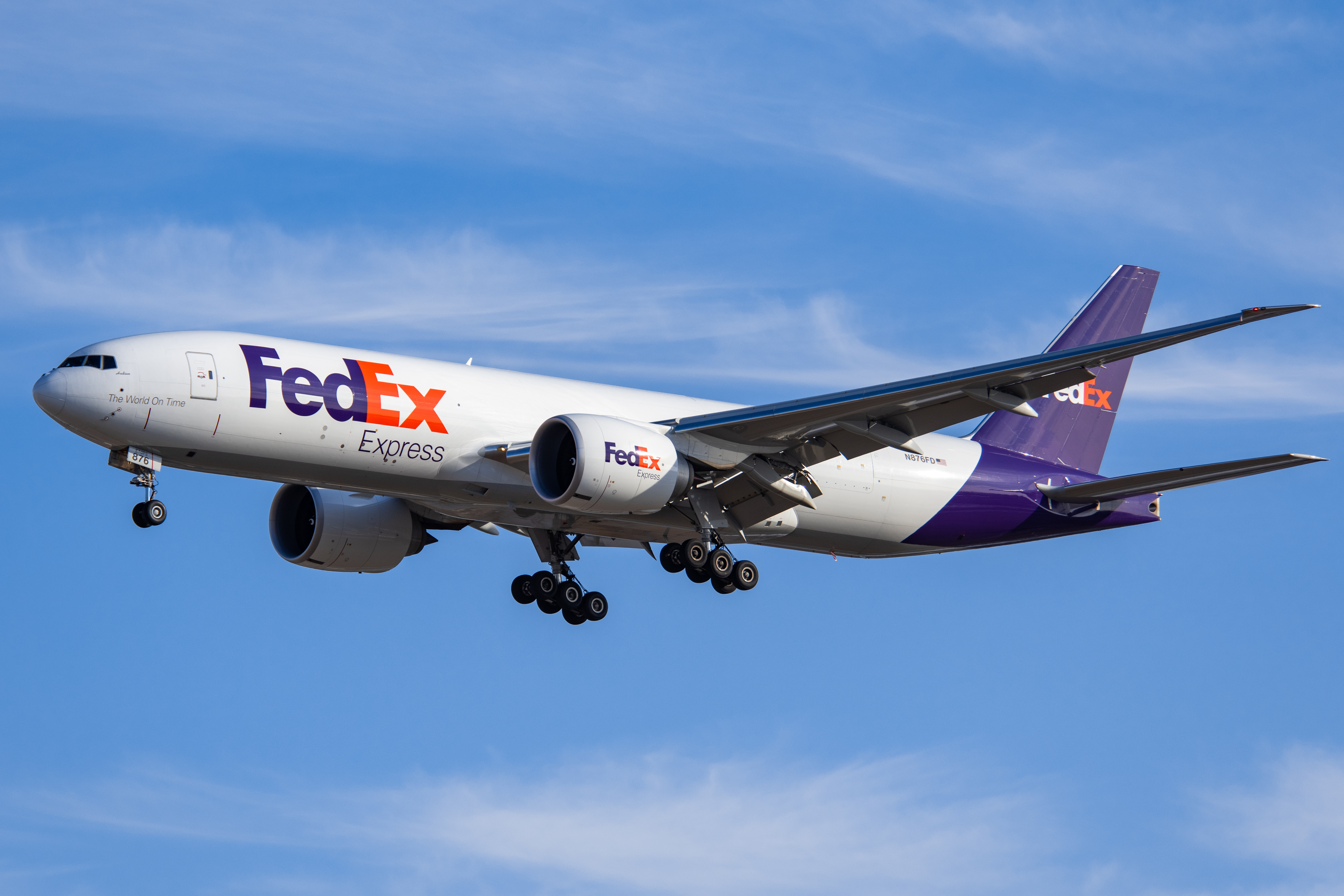
Boeing 777 of the FedEx Express

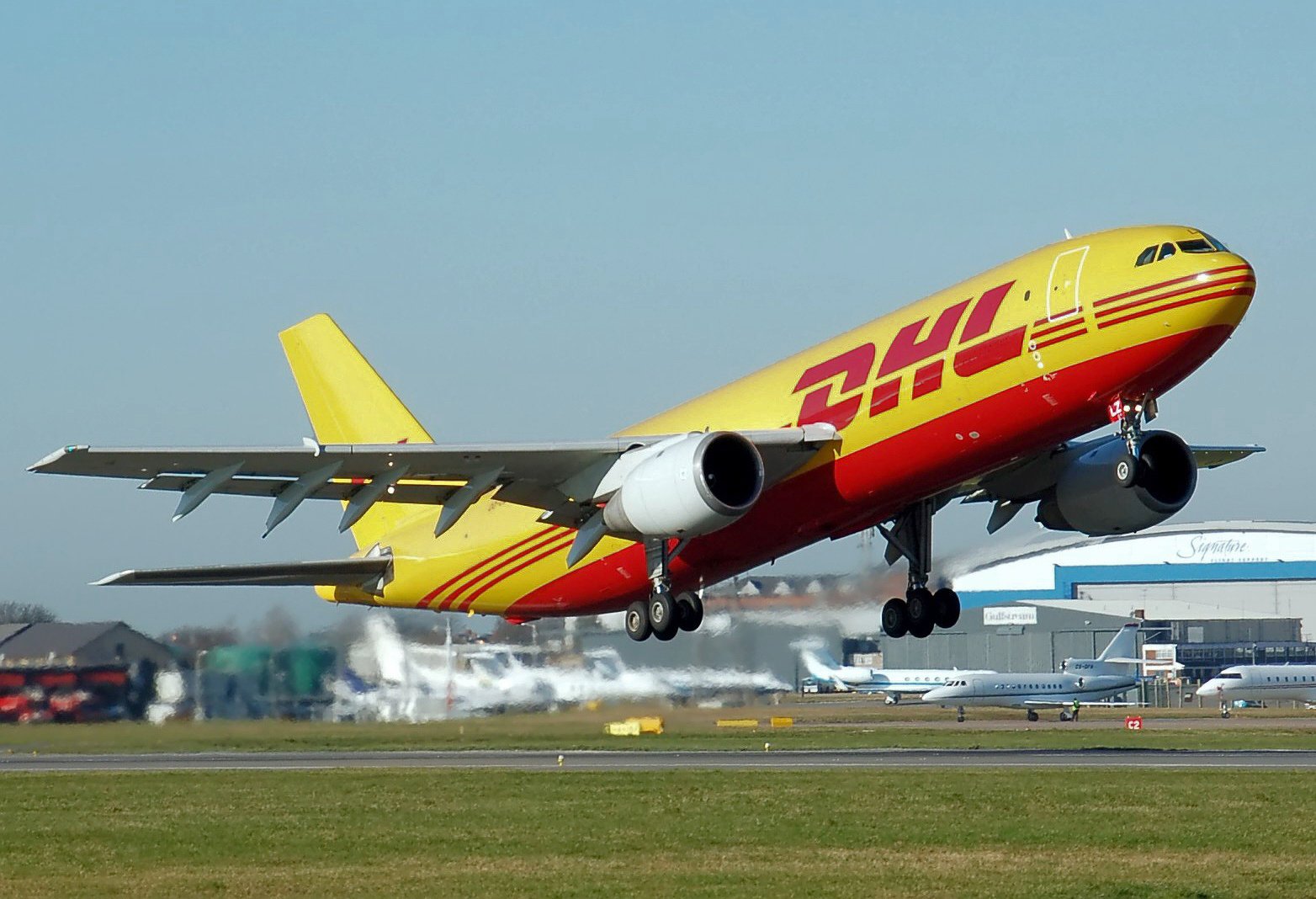
A300 of European Air Transport, a subsidiary of DHL Aviation

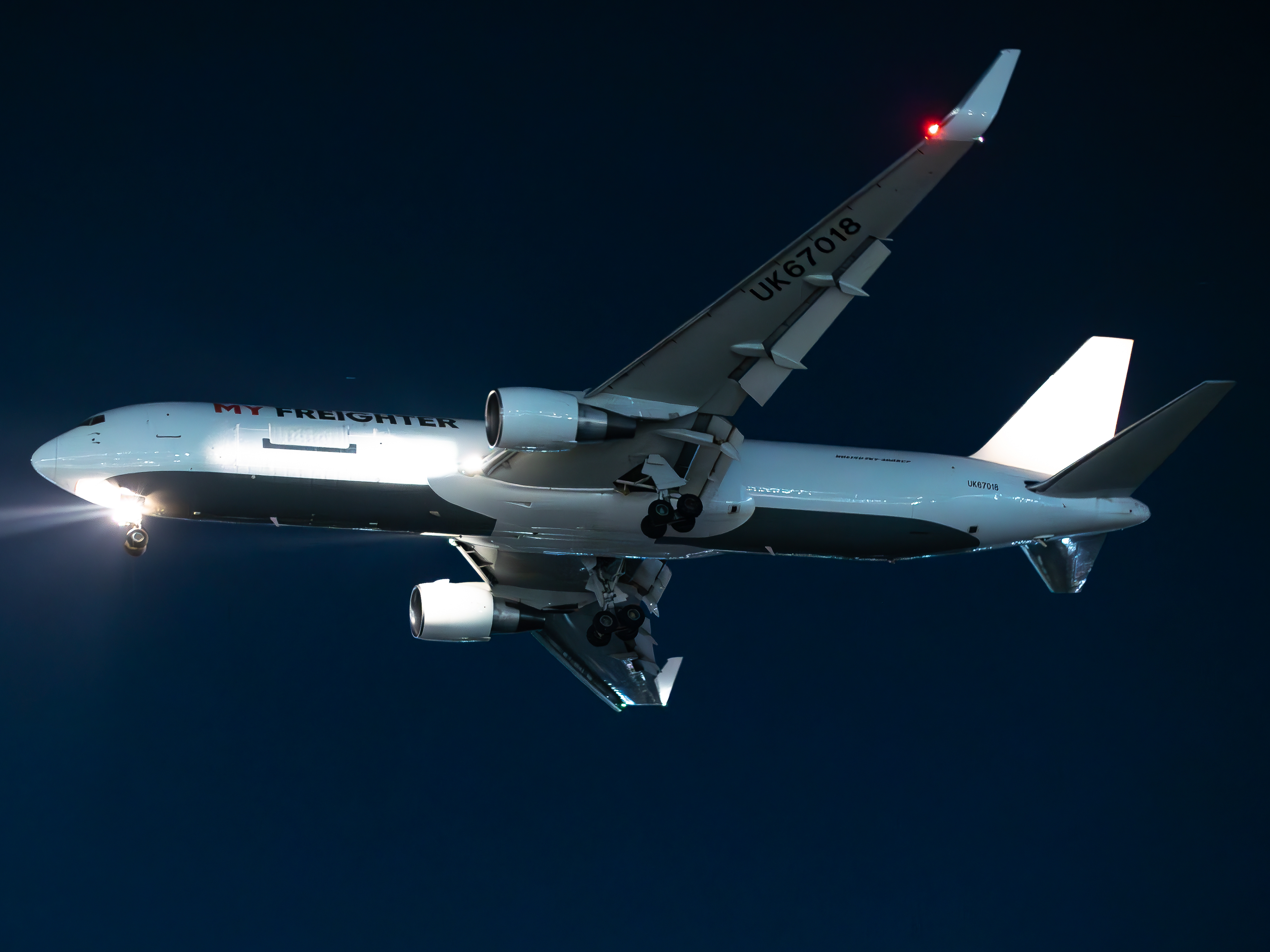
My Freighter Airlines Boeing 767-300F night landing in Tashkent Airport, Uzbekistan

Some more large cargo carriers are:

- Air France Cargo Division
- American Airlines Cargo Division
- Asiana Airlines Cargo Division
- Atlas Air
- British Airways Cargo Division
- China Airlines
- EVA Air Cargo Division
- Etihad Airways Cargo Division
- KLM Cargo Division
- Polar Air Cargo
- Turkish Airlines
- United Airlines Cargo Division
- WestJet Cargo Division

=== All-cargo subsidiary ===
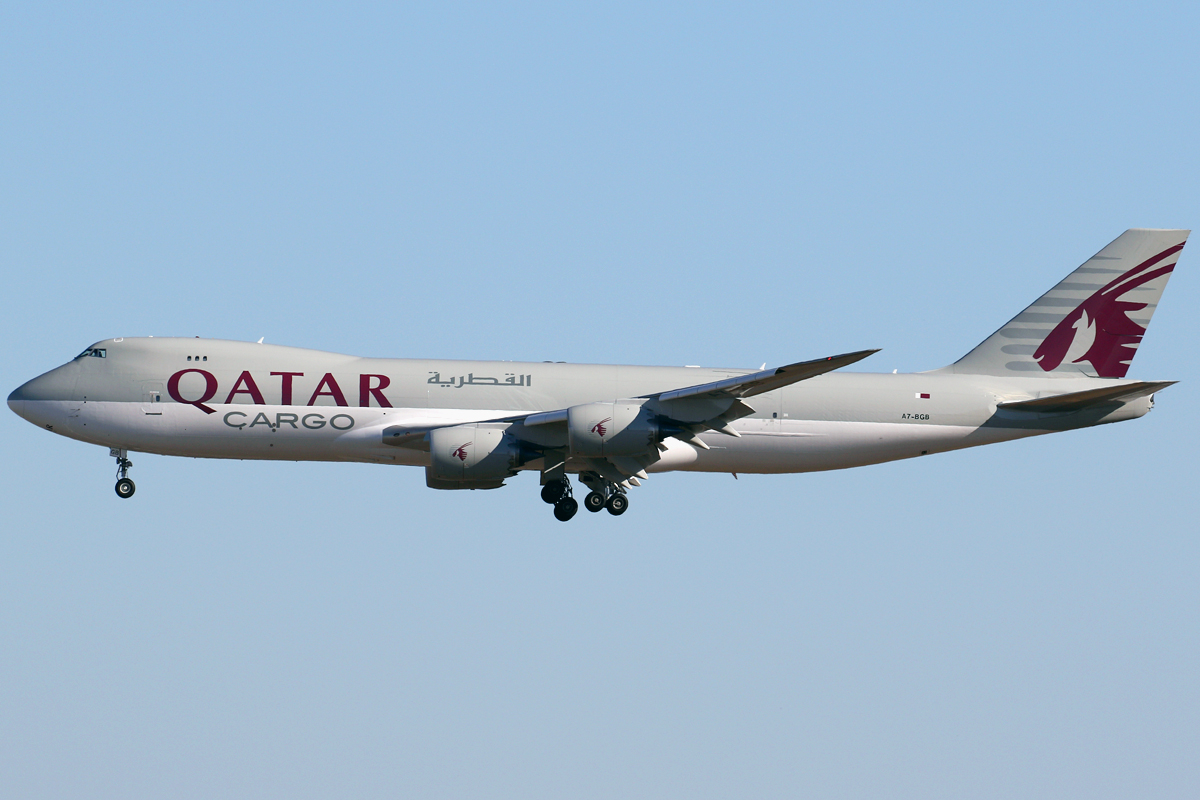
747-8 of Qatar Airways Cargo, the largest all-cargo subsidiary

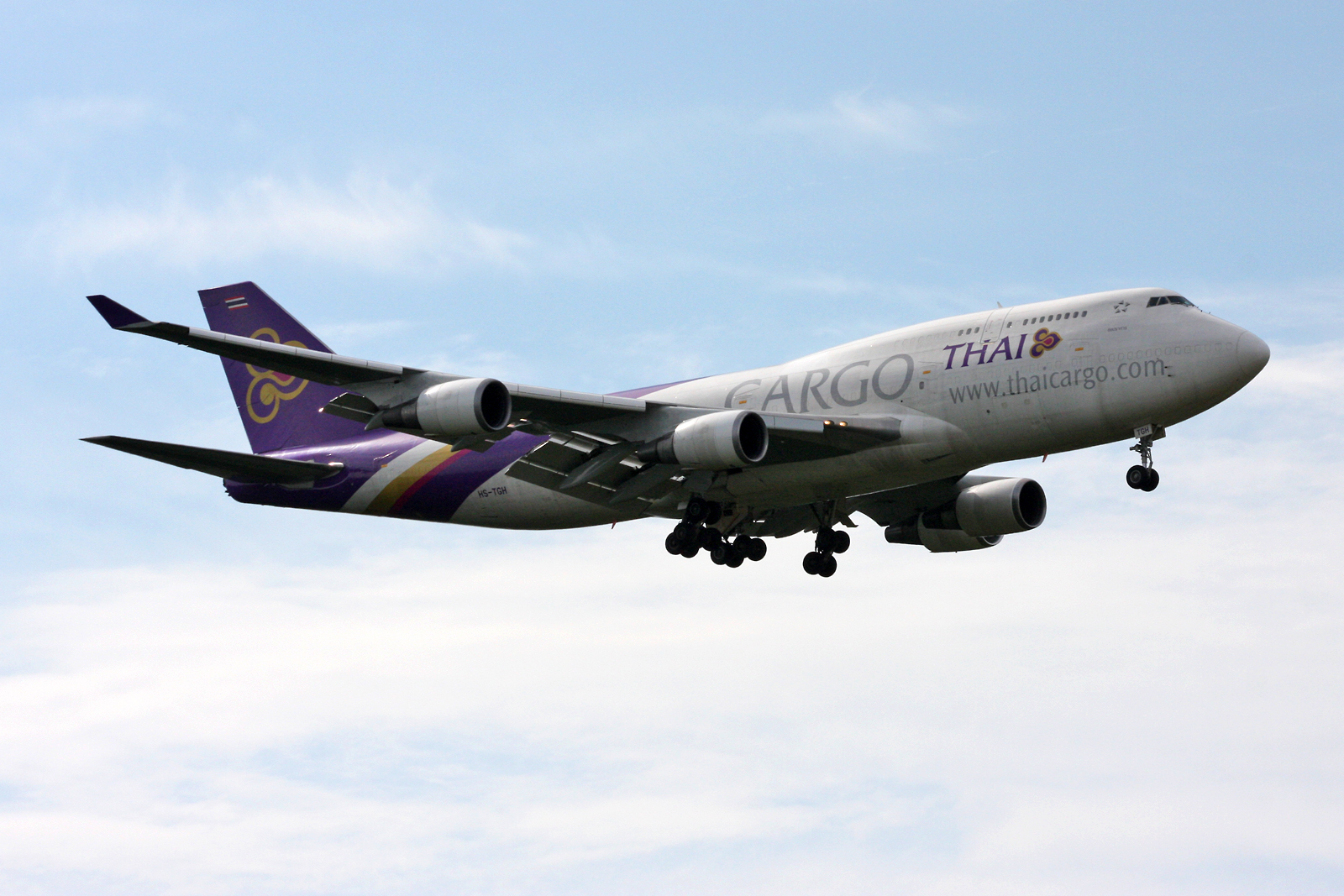
747-400BCF of Thai Airways International

The following are or were freight divisions of passenger airlines that operated their own or leased freighter aircraft. Some have since shut down or merged with others:

- Aeroflot-Cargo
- Air Canada Cargo
- Air China Cargo
- Air France Cargo
- Air Hong Kong (Cathay Pacific)
- Air India Cargo
- Air Macau Cargo
- ANA Cargo
- Asiana Cargo
- Avianca Cargo
- Cathay Pacific Cargo
- Cebu Pacific Cargo (Cebu Pacific)
- China Airlines Cargo
- China Cargo Airlines (China Eastern Airlines)
- China Southern Cargo
- Delta Air Freight
- EgyptAir Cargo
- EL AL Cargo
- Emirates SkyCargo
- Ethiopian Airlines Cargo
- Etihad Cargo
- EVA Air Cargo
- Finnair Cargo
- Hong Kong Air Cargo (Hong Kong Airlines)
- IAG Cargo
- Icelandair Cargo
- Iran Air Cargo
- KLM Cargo
- Korean Air Cargo
- LAN Cargo
- Lufthansa Cargo
- MASkargo
- Qatar Airways Cargo
- RAM Cargo
- Royal Jordanian Cargo
- Saudia Cargo
- Shanghai Airlines Cargo
- Singapore Airlines Cargo
- South African Airways Cargo
- SpiceXpress
- TAM Cargo
- Turkish Airlines Cargo
- Uzbekistan Airways Cargo
- Yakutia Airlines Cargo

The following are freight divisions without freighter fleets, using passenger aircraft holds or having other cargo airlines fly on their behalf. Some of these previously had freighters:

- Alaska Air Cargo (2 cargo planes, 13 on order)
- American Airlines Freight
- British Airways World Cargo (opb Global Supply, three a/c to be in full BA Cargo scheme)
- Caribbean Airlines
- Cargo Garuda Indonesia
- Czech Airlines Cargo
- Delta Air Lines Cargo
- Dragon Air Cargo
- Gol Transportes Aéreos
- Gulf Air Cargo
- Hainan Airlines Cargo
- Iberia Cargo
- Japan Airlines Cargo
- Kenya Airways Cargo
- KLM Cargo (opb Martinair Cargo, four a/c in full KLM scheme)
- Kuwait Airways Cargo
- LOT Polish Airlines Cargo
- Pakistan International Airlines Cargo
- Philippine Airlines Cargo
- Qantas Freight (two a/c opb Express Freighters in Qantas scheme minus logo)
- SAS Cargo Group
- Shenzhen Airlines Cargo
- Sichuan Airlines Cargo
- South African Airways
- SriLankan Cargo
- Sudan Airways
- Swiss WorldCargo
- Thai Airways Cargo (two aircraft operated by Southern Air in full Thai Cargo scheme)
- United Airlines Cargo
- Virgin Atlantic Cargo
- Virgin Australia Cargo

These carriers operate freighter aircraft but do not have cargo divisions:

- Air Koryo
- Ariana Afghan Airlines
- Iraqi Airways
- Syrian Air
- Tajik Air
- Turkmenistan Airlines

These carriers operate freighter aircraft exclusively

- Aerotranscargo
- Bismillah Airlines
- Fly Pro
- My Freighter Airlines

== See also ==
- Airlift
- Cargo aircraft
- Cargo terminal
- Counter-to-counter package
- Dangerous goods
- List of cargo airlines
- Timeline of Air Cargo
