= John Robert Porter =

English businessman (1953–2021)

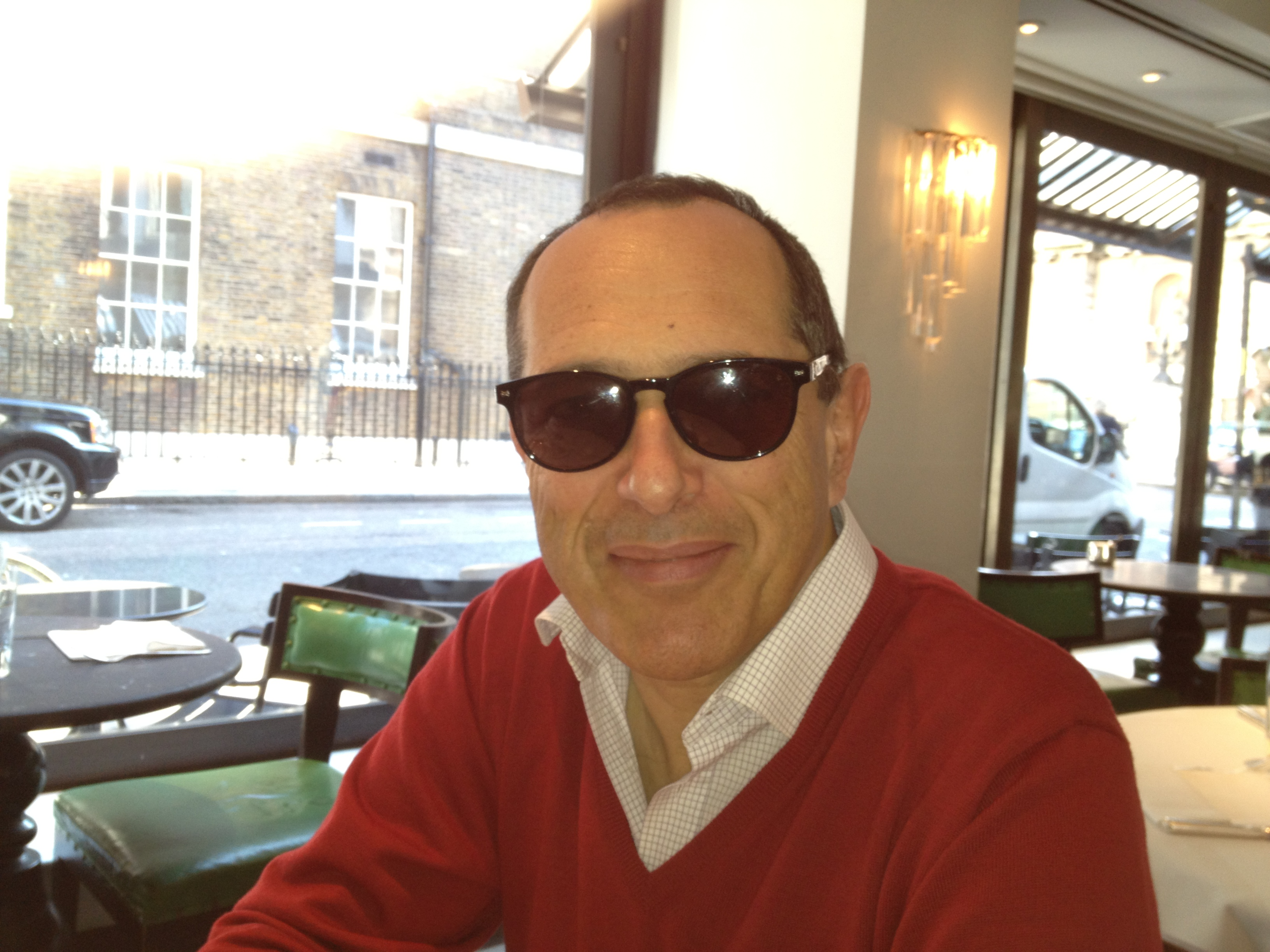
- Porter at Cecconi's Mayfair, London
- Born: 5 January 1953; London, United Kingdom
- Died: 10 November 2021 (aged 68)
- Occupation: Businessman
- Known for: Verifone
- Children: 2
- Parents: Sir Leslie Porter (father); Dame Shirley Porter (mother)

John Robert Camber Porter (5 January 1953 – 10 November 2021) was an English businessman best known as the grandson of Sir Jack Cohen, founder of Tesco, and son of Dame Shirley Porter.

== Early life and education ==
When John Porter was young, he was given £4 million by his grandfather, Sir Jack Cohen, the founder of Tesco. He was educated at Highgate School and obtained degrees from Oxford, the Institute d’Etudes Politiques in Paris, and Stanford Graduate School of Business, where he has also served on the advisory council.

== Business career ==
In 1985 Porter became chairman of Verifone and remained a director until the company was sold to Hewlett-Packard in 1997. During the early 1990s he became involved with a property development company called Chelverton Investments, owning a 45 percent stake as of 1993.

A key plank in John Porter's empire was said in 2000 to be the fortune he had made out of the US computer company Telos, based in Virginia, which has close ties to the Pentagon. Telos was originally called C3, and specialised in the communication systems that formed the backbone of the US Army.

In 2015 Porter used his holding company i-Spire to acquire a 50% stake in digital marketing firm of LD Sharma i.e. Shoogloo.

In 2016 Porter joined the Board of Trustees of UK charity Paintings in Hospitals.

Porter died of lung cancer on 10 November 2021, aged 68, after a 5-year illness.
