= Global Supply Systems =

British cargo airline

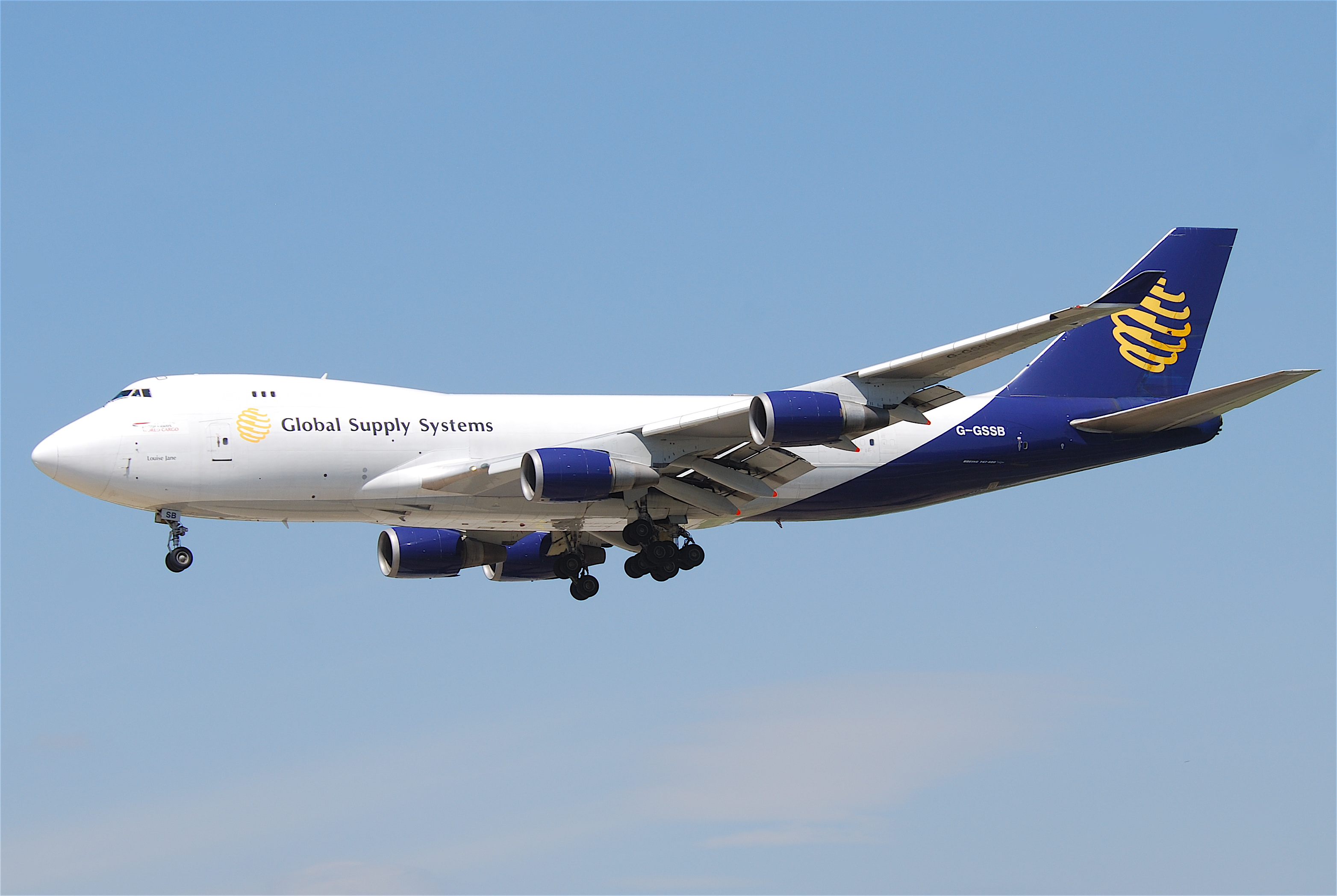
- Boeing 747-400
IATA	ICAO	Call sign
XH	GSS	JET LIFT
- Founded: April 2001
- Commenced operations: June 2002
- Ceased operations: 1 May 2014
- AOC #: 2169
- Hubs: London Stansted Airport
- Fleet size: 3
- Parent company: Atlas Air Worldwide Holdings
- Headquarters: London Stansted Airport
- Website: gssair.co.uk

Global Supply Systems Ltd. (GSS) was a British cargo airline based at London Stansted Airport. It provided dedicated freighters to airlines on a wet lease basis. The company held a United Kingdom Civil Aviation Authority Type A Operating Licence, it was permitted to carry passengers, cargo and mail on aircraft with 20 or more seats.

== History ==
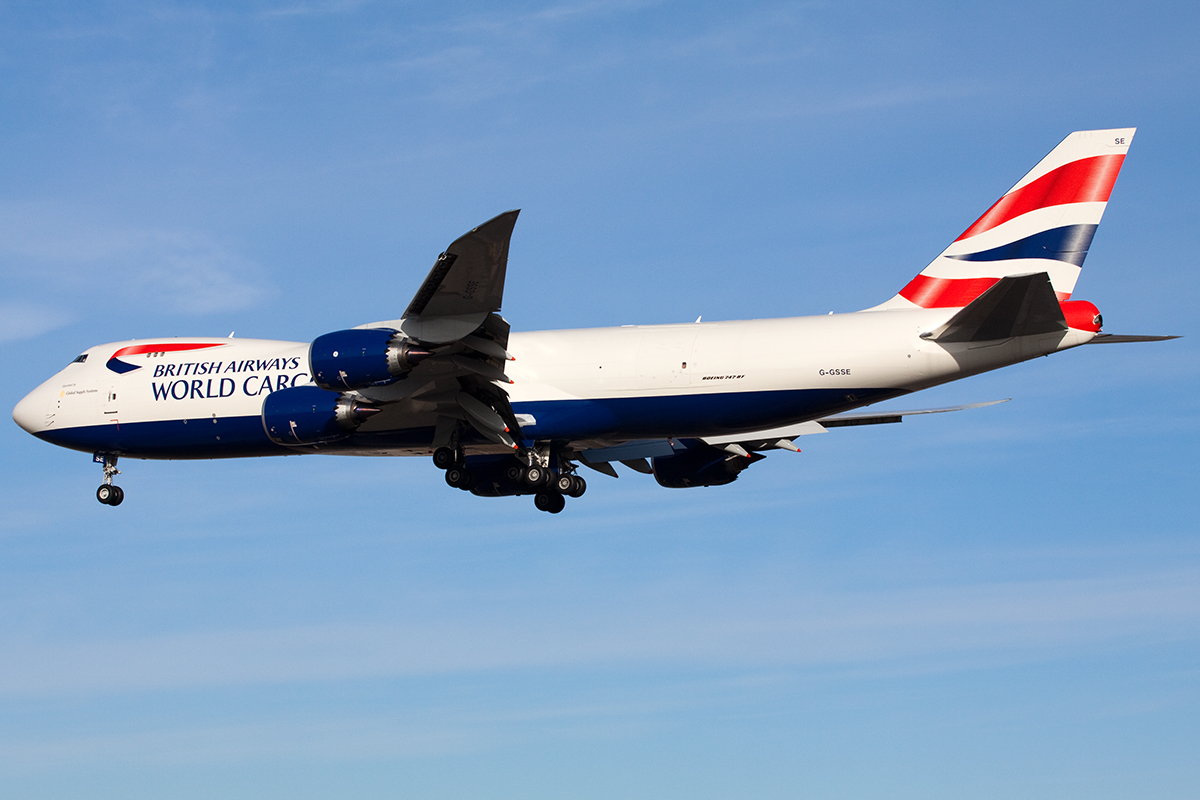
Boeing 747-8F operated for British Airways World Cargo

The company changed its name (Note: It was formed as a Shelf company in August 2000) to Global Supply Systems Ltd. on 31 January 2001,. It was founded by Atlas Air and John Robert Porter and was majority British-owned (51%), with Atlas Air as minority shareholder (49%). The air carrier started operations on 29 June 2002. It began flying operations for British Airways World Cargo between London Stansted, Frankfurt and Hong Kong using a Boeing 747-400 freighter on dry lease from partner Atlas Air.

In January 2014, British Airways World Cargo, the airline's main customer, terminated its contract, effective from 30 April. GSS was unable to find a new customer and ceased operations during the spring.

GSS continued to dry-lease two Boeing 777F aircraft to an international cargo airline.

== Fleet ==
Global Supply Systems had operated three Boeing 747-400F which were later replaced by three Boeing 747-8F.

== See also ==
- List of defunct airlines of the United Kingdom
