= Barbara Cassani =

American businesswoman (born 1960)

Barbara Ann Cassani
- Born: July 22, 1960 (age 66); Boston, Massachusetts, United States
- Education: Mount Holyoke College, Princeton University
- Occupation: Businesswoman
- Known for: Founder of Go Fly, Leader of London's 2012 Olympic Bid
- Spouse: Guy Davis
- Children: 2
- Awards: Veuve Clicquot Businesswoman of the Year

Barbara Ann Cassani, CBE (born July 22, 1960) is an American businesswoman. She was the founder under British Airways of budget airline Go Fly and was the first leader of London's bid for the 2012 Summer Olympics.

== Personal life ==
Barbara Cassani was born in Boston to James and Noreen Cassani. She studied at Mount Holyoke College, graduating magna cum laude with a BA (Hons) international relations in 1982; and is also a former trustee of Mount Holyoke. Cassani earned a master's degree, again in international relations, from Princeton University's Woodrow Wilson School of Public and International Affairs. She was awarded an honorary degree from Cranfield University in 2004.

Cassani married British investment banker Guy Davis in 1985. The couple have two children, Lauren and James. She is a keen horse rider, and competes in eventing, showjumping, and dressage events. Since stepping down from the Olympic bid, Cassani has been working on plans for a new startup company, and appears as a business and management speaker on the public speaking circuit.

== Professional life ==
Upon graduation in 1984, Cassani worked as a management consultant for Coopers & Lybrand before moving to work in the US operation of British Airways. There, she worked in sales, marketing, and on the team that integrated Dan-Air into BA's business.

In 1997, facing increasing competition from low cost airlines Ryanair and EasyJet, British Airways decided to found its own budget offering, to be known as 'Go'. Chief Executive Bob Ayling selected Cassani for the task, giving her only £25 million in seed capital. The company began operations in 1998 and reached profitability two years later. In 2001, Cassani led a management buyout of the company (with most of the funding coming from venture capital firm 3i), and became its first Chief Executive.

In 2002, Cassani won the Veuve Clicquot Businesswoman of the Year award. Later that year, the airline was bought by rival EasyJet (a move bitterly opposed by Cassani) and she was not offered a position in the merged company. She next released a book detailing her experiences at Go; Go - An Airline Adventure (ISBN 0-316-72662-1) won a number of business publishing awards the following year.

In October 2003, Cassani became a non-executive director of retailer Marks & Spencer, a position she relinquished when she accepted the Olympic position. After her Olympic tenure, she was one of the executives mooted as taking over as the struggling company's Chief Executive.

=== London 2012 Olympics bid ===
In June 2003, Cassani was appointed to chair London's bid to host the 2012 Summer Olympics. The organizing committee felt that her business background would give the bid a badly needed professionalism; the organizational reputation of British sport had already been tarnished when it won the right to host the 2005 World Athletics Championships but was forced to withdraw when the promised stadium could not be built.

Cassani's selection surprised many commentators, as she was unknown in the highly political world of Olympic sport. Although she was married to a Briton and had lived in the UK for more than a decade, her American nationality also raised some eyebrows.

She led the bid through the first phase of the two-stage bidding process. During her tenure, the newly formed bid team grew to a staff of 80, with many large institutional backers, and gained increasing approval from a sceptical British public and political class. Her team created the bid's master plan, which detailed where events would be held, what infrastructure would be built, and provided an overall budget projection for the Games. This was submitted to the International Olympic Committee in the spring of 2004, and on the strength of it London was selected as one of the five candidate cities.

In March 2004, The Daily Telegraph diary column printed claims that Cassani had been highly critical of Tony Blair, saying "To be frank he wasn't very bright ... the subject he got most animated about was beach volleyball." Cassani sued for libel saying that the story was not only completely without foundation but also highly damaging to the bid; on April 21, the Telegraph admitted that she had made none of the remarks attributed to her, and agreed to apologise in print, pay her costs, and make a donation to the Olympic bid committee.

In May 2004, Cassani announced she was stepping down as chairman in favour of Olympic gold medallist and politician Lord Coe, saying that she felt the bid had reached a stage where his track record in the Olympic movement would be more useful to the bid than her technical and managerial experience. Some commentators felt, however, that her departure had been precipitated by internal politics in the British sports establishment. Pierre-Yves Gerbeau, whom she had appointed as the bid's ambassador, quit the effort shortly after she stepped down, saying the way Cassani had been treated was "shocking."

Cassani stayed on with the bid, serving under Coe as Vice Chairman responsible for technical aspects of the bid. She continued to serve on the board (working unpaid one day per week); the IOC awarded the XXXth Olympiad to London on 6 July 2005.

On 24 September 2007, Cassani became the new chairman of the board at Vueling Airlines, replacing Jose Miguel Abad Silvestre, who resigned abruptly citing "managerial differences." Vueling, founded in 2004, is an airline based in Barcelona, Spain, whose share value in the stock market had dropped by 30% earlier in 2007. Board members Jose Creuheras Margenat and Ferran Conti Penina also resigned. Since 2013, Vueling has been part of International Airlines Group which also owns British Airways. Cassani was appointed Executive Chairperson of Jurys Inn hotels in 2008.
