= British Airways Engineering =

Aircraft maintenance subsidiary of British Airways

British Airways Engineering is the aircraft maintenance subsidiary of British Airways which provides support services to British Airways and other airlines. It is responsible for the entire BA fleet maintenance, cabin interior conversions and general ramp maintenance work for both their own fleet and other airlines. It also sends some of its own heavy maintenance work out to other companies, although the vast majority of aircraft and cabin interior work is still carried out by BA Engineering itself.

British Airways Engineering was formed from the merger of the engineering divisions of BOAC and BEA's when the two airlines merged in 1974 to form British Airways. Today, British Airways Engineering has hangars at Heathrow (its base), Gatwick, Glasgow and Cardiff airports as well as hundreds of line maintenance stations (engineers located around the world to do minor 'line' maintenance such as routine daily inspections or minor repairs). A team of about 30 engineers are still based at Manchester earning revenue from various other airlines. It also consists of the Avionic division which is based at Pontyclun, South Wales, which services the majority of the removable avionic units, and some mechanical components.

== Facilities ==
There are now 3 main maintenance hangars at Heathrow, these being (TB standing for technical block) TBJ, TBK and TBA along with a huge maintenance hangar called the "Cathedral" and TBE plus engineering's main Headquarters building called TBC.

TBJ: Consists of two hangars (bays 1 & 2) used by Long haul casualty inputs.

TBK: Consists of two hangars (bays 3 & 4) with bay 3 being a former paint bay, currently being converted into a new hangar and Bay 4 being another hangar for Long haul casualty.

Opposite TBJ/K hangars there is a parking area known as "TA" stands for the up to eight aircraft and an engine run pen.

TBA: (4 Hangar, 8 bay complex): All of BA's A380, A350, 787, and 777 'light' maintenance is done in the East and North pens. West pen is reserved for A380 Long haul casualty maintenance. South pen is the only unmodified hangar and retains its original concrete span exterior (the reason for the building's listed status) and the home of some minor A320 family maintenance.

TBE/Cathedral: The shorthaul minor or 'casualty' hangar, is where most minor work is done, engine and leg changes for example and any work that can be done in the short period of time an aircraft has on the ground. The section covers all the airline's Airbus A320 family fleet and Airbus A350 fleet. Engineers based here support the Terminal 5 maintenance team, the section is known as the FSU or (Fleet Support Unit).

TBC: Engineering's main headquarters offices are on the tenth floor, and is where most support engineers and senior managers are based as are Planning, development, finance and technical support sections. The ground floor houses the engine workshops and a large Composite/Sheet Metal repair facility with paint shop. Recent refurbishments have allowed the Global Learning Academy to move into the first and ninth floors (after the subsequent closure of Cranebank Training Centre.)

TBN: Was a hangar formerly leased by BMI, which was acquired in the takeover by British Airways of BMI, TBN stands between TBK and Virgin's Hangar, but on the airfield side of the old aircraft level crossing. This hangar was used for long-haul Casualty Maintenance and Engineering training, but is now owned by United Airlines.

=== Cardiff ===
British Airways Maintenance Cardiff (BAMC) is based at Cardiff International Airport. Here, all 747 (now retired), 777 and 787 fleet 'heavy' maintenance along with most of the airline's long-haul fleet interior conversions is done. British Airways Avionic Engineering (BAAE) is also based in South Wales which is responsible for the repair, modification and overhaul of the vast majority of the avionic and electrical components used in the BA fleet and some of those used by other airlines. It is situated in three purpose built workshop buildings at Llantrisant. There is also a facility in Hayes, west London: British Airways Component Engineering, (BACE) which carries out repair and overhaul on pneumatic, hydraulic and power generating components as well as wheels and brakes. There is also a machine shop where repair and manufacture of parts is carried out. Third party work is done here also. BACE Hayes is currently in the process of being closed, with particular of the facility moving into TBC.

=== Glasgow ===
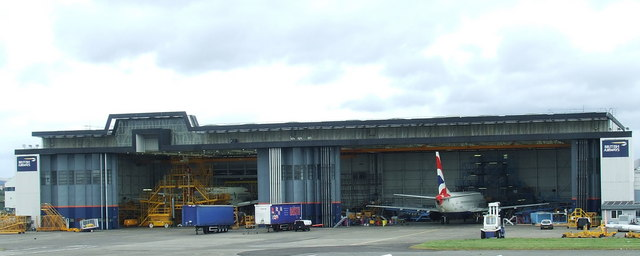
British Airways Maintenance Hangar at Glasgow Airport

British Airways Maintenance Glasgow (BAMG) is where all Airbus A319/A320/A321ceo and neo heavy maintenance is done. In 2012 all 737-400 series "heavy" maintenance was outsourced to contractors based in Sofia, Bulgaria and from 2014 KLM engineering in Norwich owing to the age of the aircraft. Only "light" maintenance cycles continued at Gatwick until their retirement in 2015. The BAMG hangar has avionic, composite and an interiors workshop. All components that are not overhauled at Glasgow are sent to London for overhaul. In late 2011 Glasgow's maintenance hangar was expanded to the ex-Polar Air Cargo hangar at Prestwick Airport and done wing skin corrosion checks and repairs on the Airbus A318, A319, A320 and A321 fleet the last aircraft was completed in January 2014. The hangar reopened in August 2014 to carry out C-Checks on both A318 aircraft but then closed again when both aircraft were completed.

== See also ==
- British Airways Maintenance Cardiff
