= Robert Ayling =

British businessman

Robert Ayling CBE
- Born: 3 August 1946 (age 79); Battersea, London, England
- Education: King's College School

Robert John Ayling CBE (born 3 August 1946), also known as Bob Ayling, is a British retired lawyer and businessman who has worked with a variety of high-profile companies and organisations. From 1996 to 2000, he was the CEO of British Airways. He also served as chairman of Her Majesty's Courts and Tribunals Service, Dŵr Cymru (Welsh Water), and Dyson. Ayling was appointed a CBE in the Queen's 2018 Birthday Honors List.

== Early life ==
Ayling was born in Battersea the son of a grocer, George and civil servant Hilda. He was educated at King's College School, Wimbledon but left school at 16 after his father's business failed, and took articles with a solicitor. He passed his professional examinations by 19 and in 1968 was admitted a solicitor at 21.

== Career ==
Ayling, a lawyer, began his career as a solicitor in private practice before joining the Department of Trade and Industry in 1974.

In 1985, he joined British Airways (BA), initially as legal director, where he was responsible for the legal aspects of BA's privatisation and the acquisition of British Caledonian. He went on to hold a series of senior management positions including director of human resources and director of marketing and operations.

Ayling was appointed group managing director of BA in 1993 and chief executive in 1996.

A key policy of Ayling's time was reduction in operating costs to enable the airline to survive in the more competitive markets following de-regulation of the aviation industry. His policies, including setting up in 1998 of the low cost airline 'Go' with Barbara Cassani as CEO, drew intense hostility from the trade unions. He also pursued a merger and establishment of a strategic alliance with American Airlines and BA's investment in Iberia. Ayling re-introduced beds on long haul flights and was the main protagonist and promoter of BA's London Eye project for the Millennium. In 2000, he was replaced at BA, following continued trade union opposition, by Rod Eddington.

Ayling joined the board of Dyson Ltd in 2001 serving until 2012, including a stint as chairman from 2010 to 2012. He was also appointed a non-executive Director of Holidaybreak Plc, the specialist holiday and activity group, in February 2003, before becoming chairman in June 2003. He retired in April 2009.

He was appointed a non-executive director of Dŵr Cymru (Welsh Water) in 2008, becoming chairman in 2009. He retired in 2017.

He was appointed first independent chairman of HM Courts and Tribunals Service on its creation in April 2011. He led the major Reform of the Service serving under six Lord Chancellors and three Lord Chief Justices. He retired in April 2018.

Business positions
Preceded by Colin Marshall	CEO of British Airways; 1996–2000	Succeeded by Rod Eddington
