= Sean Doyle (businessman) =

Irish businessman

Sean Doyle is an Irish businessman, and the chairman and CEO of British Airways.

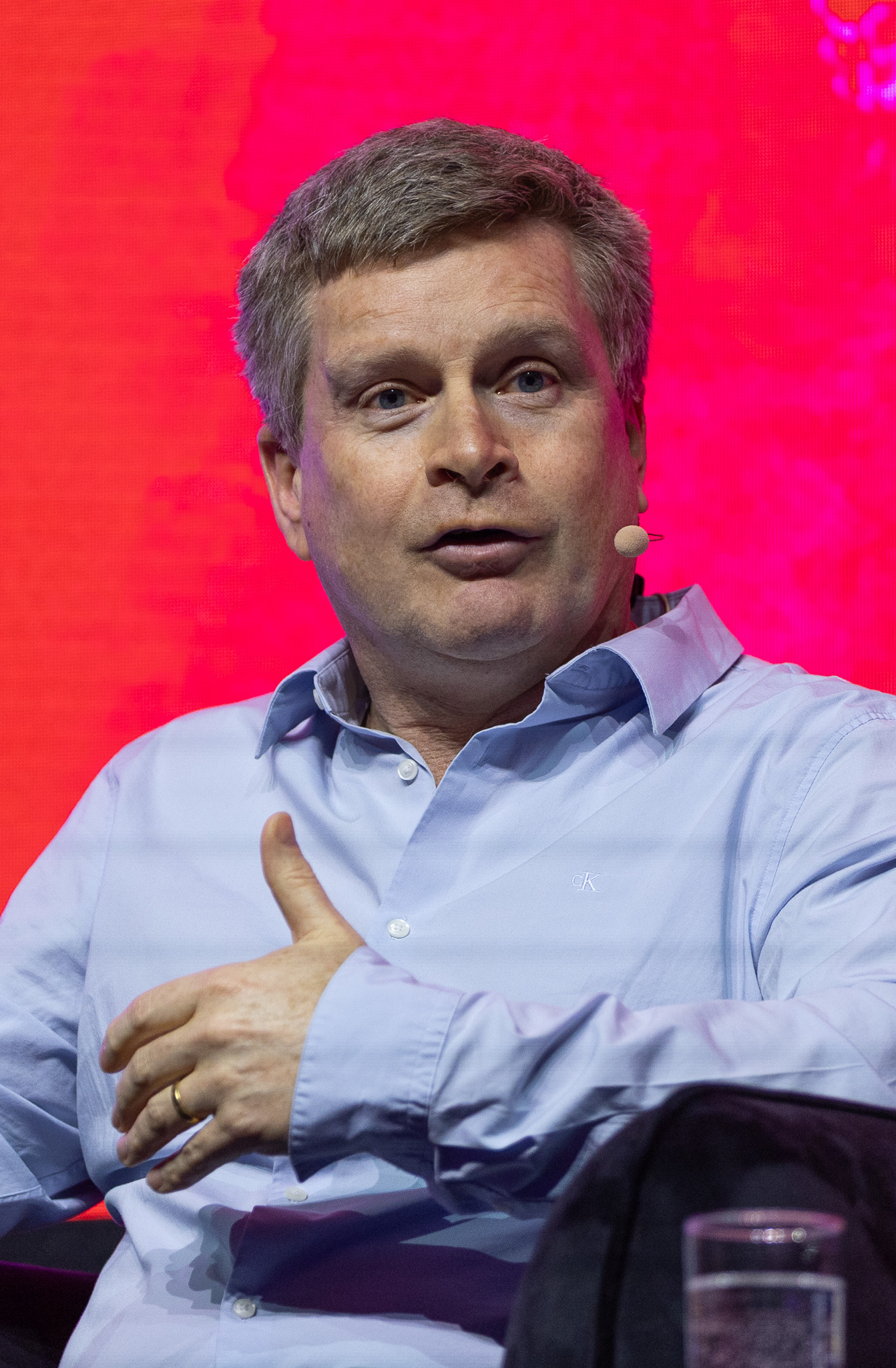
Doyle in 2025

== Biography ==
The son of a Garda sergeant originally from Wexford, Doyle was born and grew up in Youghal, Ireland. He earned a bachelor's degree from University College Cork (UCC), before going on to train as a management accountant.

He joined British Airways in 1998 as a junior finance and business analyst for its African operations, and joined the executive management committee in 2016 as director of network, fleet and alliances. He became CEO of Aer Lingus (also part of the IAG airline group) in January 2019. In October 2020, it was announced that Doyle would succeed Álex Cruz as CEO of British Airways. In 2023, it was reported Doyle had a basic salary of £670,000.

In June 2024 Sean Doyle oversaw 100 years of flights to Pakistan, making it the only Western airline in the country.

He is married and has one son. He lives in Hammersmith, West London.

Business positions
Preceded by Álex Cruz	CEO of British Airways; 2020–present	Incumbent
