= Plane Saver Credit Union =

Credit union in the United Kingdom

- Founded: 1993
- Type: Industrial and Provident Society
- Location: Profile West, 950 Great West Road, Brentford, TW8 9ES
- Website: planesavercu.co.uk

Plane Saver Credit Union is a not-for-profit financial co-operative, with their main office based in Harlington, and a second office at Heathrow Airport. A member of the Association of British Credit Unions Limited, Plane Saver has over 27,000 members, over £62 million in assets, and have lent more than £100 million to date.

== History ==
The credit union was known as British Airways (UK) Employees Credit Union from its foundation in 1993, until 1997, when it widened its scope to include employees of UK-based CAA-registered airlines and their associated companies. In 2015, Plane Saver won the contract to offer their services to the Ministry of Defence. It is currently the fourth largest credit union in the UK.

== Activities ==
The members of a credit union are required to share a common bond. In 2010, Plane Saver Credit Union further extended its common bond to those employed in, or associated with, the airline and transport industry, logistics, engineering, police, fire and ambulance services or the armed forces and it now includes most industries including healthcare, education and distribution services.

In a move backed by the Minister of State for Defence Personnel, Welfare and Veterans in 2014, the chair of the Co-operative Party called for the creation of a credit union aimed at military families. As members of the armed forces were already eligible to join, it was reported that Plane Saver was ready to assist in the creation of a military credit union, providing there could be payroll deduction. Two other credit unions also won the contract, to give armed forces personnel a choice of provider. The three credit unions formed what became known as Joining Forces, in which they work together to promote the scheme.

Plane Saver Credit Union was first UK adopter of payment waiver in 2014. Under the scheme, if a borrower cannot work due to sickness or unemployment, payments are immediately waived. The credit union is authorised by the Prudential Regulation Authority and regulated by the Financial Conduct Authority and the PRA. Ultimately, like the banks and building societies, members’ savings are protected against business failure by the Financial Services Compensation Scheme.

== See also ==
- Credit unions in the United Kingdom
- British Airways
