= Go Fly =

Airline

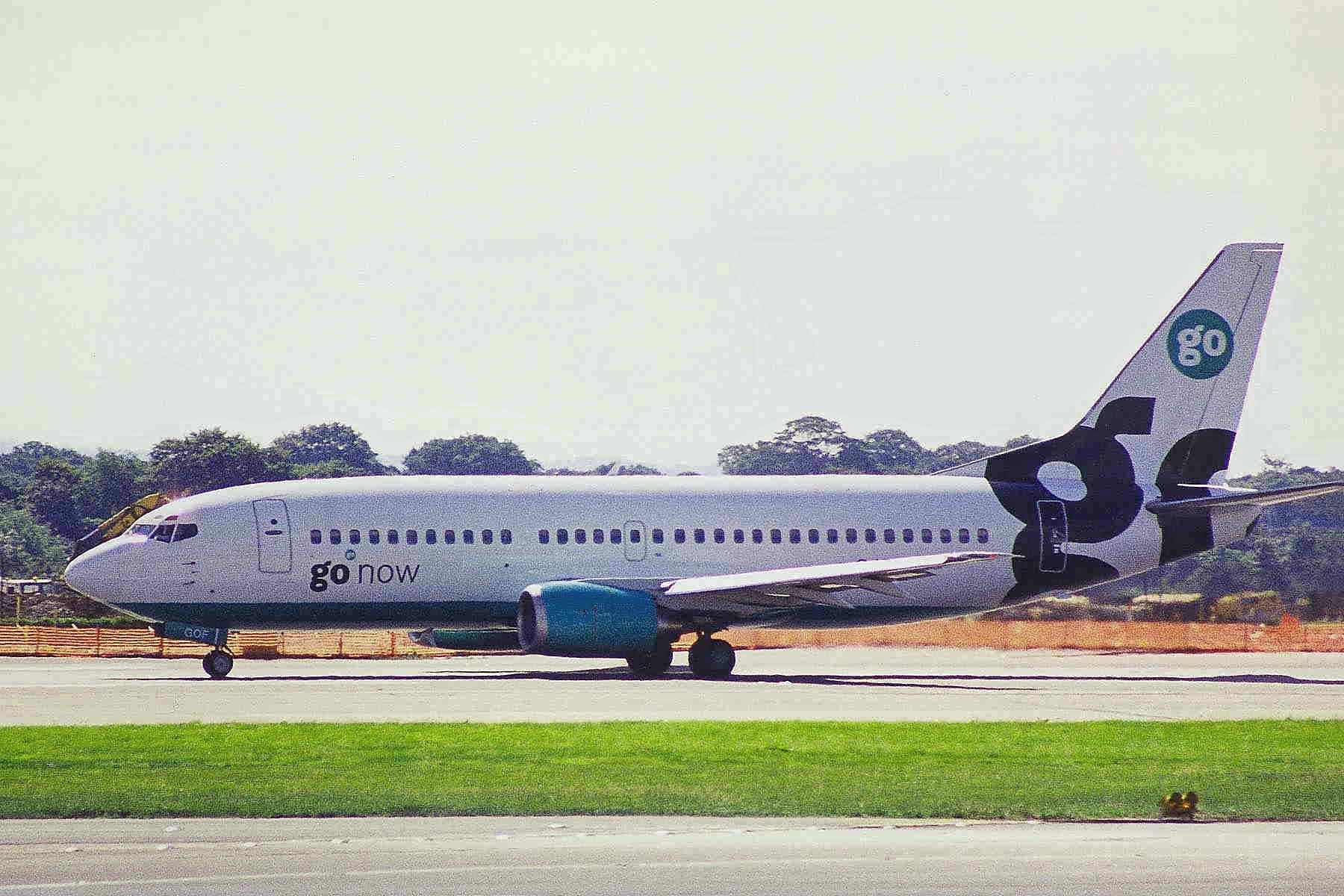
- Boeing 737-300
| IATA | ICAO | Call sign |
|---|---|---|
| GO | GOE | GO FLIGHT |
- Founded: 1998
- Commenced operations: May 1998
- Ceased operations: March 2003
- Hubs: London Stansted
- Fleet size: 24 (2001)
- Destinations: Mainland Europe
- Parent company: EasyJet (at closure)
- Headquarters: London Stansted, England
- Key people: Barbara Cassani; Robert Ayling
- Website: www.go-fly.com

Go Fly (styled and trading as go^{go}) was an English low-cost airline founded by British Airways in 1998. It operated flights between London Stansted and destinations in Europe. It was sold in 2001 in a management buyout backed by 3i and in 2002 to EasyJet and the brand retired in 2003.

== History ==
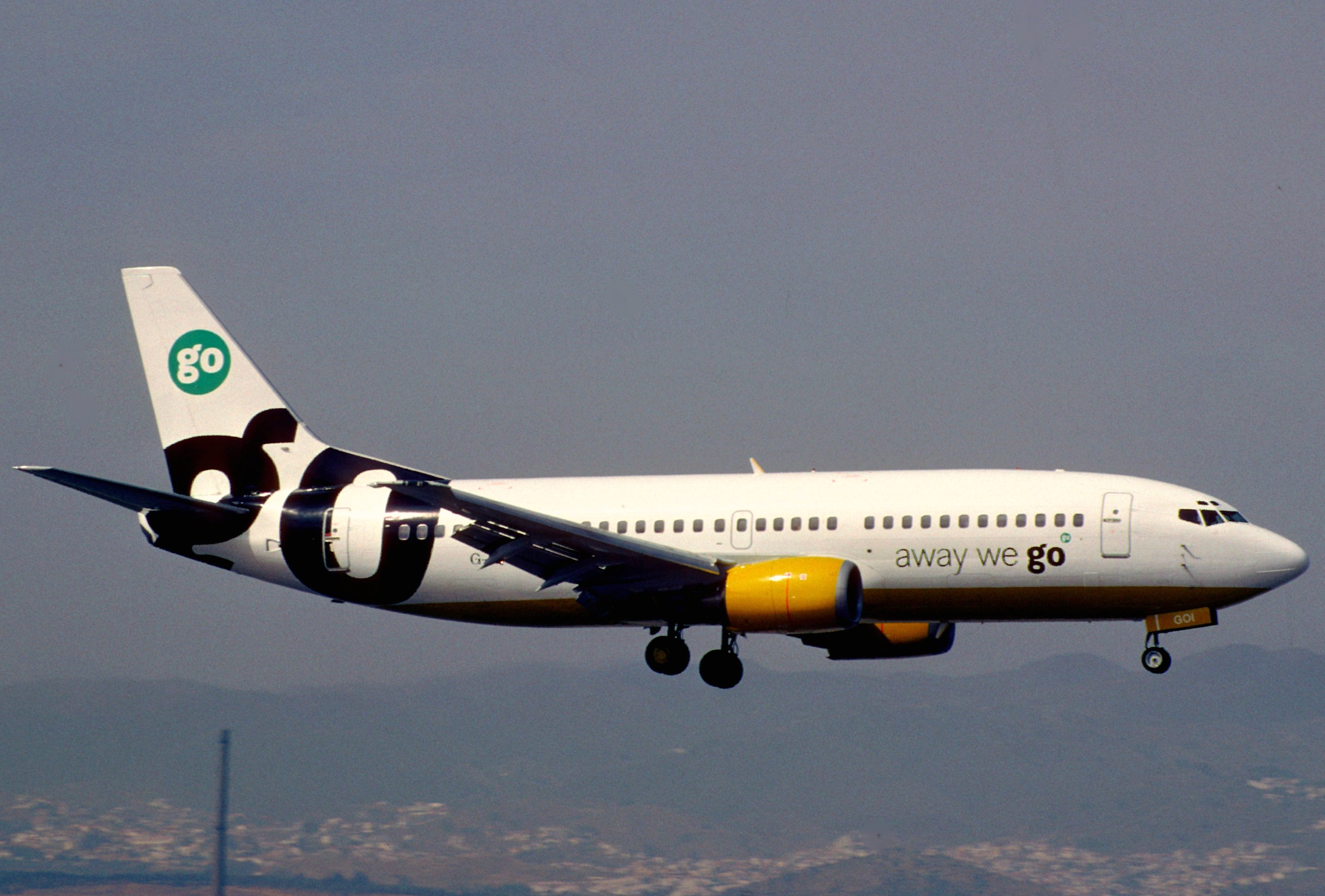
Boeing 737-300, 1999

British Airways' CEO, Robert Ayling, approached EasyJet founder Stelios Haji-Ioannou to ask whether they could meet, claiming that he was fascinated by how the Greek entrepreneur had made the budget airline formula work. Haji-Ioannou not only agreed, but allegedly showed Ayling his business plan.

In 1997, British Airways announced that, under the project name Operation Blue Sky, it would launch its own low-cost airline to meet the changing demand for air travel in Europe. According to Ayling, the new airline would "quickly become a favourite with the budget traveller" via its pricing scheme and available flights.

Barbara Cassani, who had been British Airways' General Manager in New York and had been credited with turning around the airline's flagging fortunes in the transatlantic market in the early 1990s, was chosen by Ayling to set up the new venture. The new airline would be run separately from British Airways as a wholly owned subsidiary, and would compete in the European low-cost carrier market, dominated by Ryanair and EasyJet. In 1998, the name of the new airline was announced as Go Fly Limited, following a lengthy debate over how to choose a name that would best suit the positioning of this new airline, which was already facing challenges from EasyJet, and Virgin Atlantic, among others.

The airline's initial fleet consisted of Boeing 737-300s leased from Philippine Airlines.

An additional plane, a 737-3Q8, was leased in 1998. On 22 May 1998, Go Fly flew for the first time from its base at London Stansted to Rome Ciampino. The following afternoon saw the airline's inaugural flight to Milan Malpensa Airport.

As part of EasyJet's campaign against Go Fly, Haji-Ioannou and nine other EasyJet staff booked tickets for the flight, arriving in orange boiler suits. Other early routes were to Copenhagen, Bologna and Lisbon. In July flights to Glasgow were started, then to Munich in November and Venice in December 1998, followed by Málaga, Faro, Bilbao in April 1999 and Madrid.

After leasing three further planes, including a former Air Liberté plane and another ex-British Midland jet in 1998 and 1999, six additional planes were delivered direct from Boeing, leased from GE Capital Aviation Services, bringing the total to 13. Although this was four more than originally envisaged, additional routes helped to spread the overheads.

To stem mounting losses, a significant change in strategy was announced in June 1999, cutting back on the existing schedules in favour of new routes tapping into the summer holiday market to Alicante, Ibiza and Palma de Mallorca. This was followed by winter schedules targeting skiers travelling to Lyon and Zürich, together with a new route to Prague.

In 2000, following the departure of Ayling, BA announced it planned to sell Go as part of efforts to improve profits, coupled with concerns that Go was attracting customers from BA's own services.

Estimated gains from the sale fluctuated and in January 2001, BA admitted that its initial estimates may have been incorrect, and that they now valued Go Fly at £200 million. Go was sold later that year for £100 million in a management buyout led by Cassani with the support of 3i. The airline's management team remained in place. In 2001, Go reported that it had carried 57.3% more passengers that year than in 2000.

In 2001, Go Fly expanded its UK operations, opening a second base at Bristol Airport, bringing low-cost travel to South West England for the first time.

In 2002, EasyJet announced that it had agreed terms to purchase Go Fly for £374 million to expand its own operations. By December of that year, Go Fly was operating under the easyJet Air Operators Certificate and was absorbed into it on 30 March of the following year. Following the takeover by easyJet the Go brand disappeared Although it was reported that Cassani might seek to block the deal with EasyJet, this did not happen. She did not accept a position with the new entity, with Cassani publishing Go, An Airline Adventure, which chronicled the airline's existence.

== Fleet ==
As at December 2001, the fleet comprised 24 Boeing 737-300s..
