= British Airways Maintenance Cardiff =

Aircraft maintenance facility in Wales

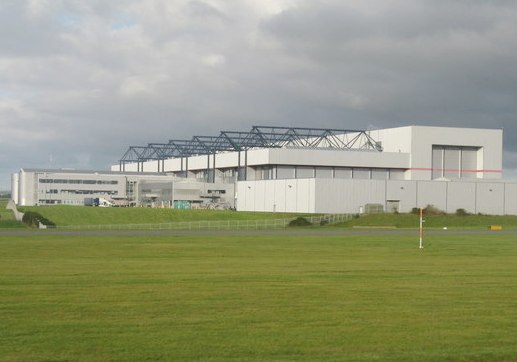
British Airways Maintenance facilities at Cardiff Airport

British Airways Maintenance Cardiff (BAMC), also known as British Airways Maintenance, is a major aircraft maintenance facility located at Cardiff Airport and a wholly owned subsidiary of British Airways and part of British Airways Engineering. It carries out heavy maintenance on all of British Airways Boeing long haul aircraft.

== History ==
In June 1990, a proposal was made to build a £70m hangar for maintenance of the BA 747 fleet at Cardiff Airport to employ 1,200 people. It was formally opened in June 1993. From February 2008, BAMC also maintained Boeing 767-300 series aircraft for BA whilst a further advance in capability has seen the introduction of Boeing 777-200ER/LR and Boeing 777-300ER aircraft from July 2010.

Major interior modifications for British Airways' aircraft have been completed at this facilities, such as the refit of Boeing 777-200 fleet in 2012, and the Boeing 747-400 in 2016.

The hangar also has the capability to handle a Boeing 787, with the first 787 arriving for maintenance in May 2016.

An expansion to the facility was announced in November 2024 to allow the maintenance of Airbus A350 aircraft.

== Structure ==
It has a three-bay hangar with two additional 'Nose In' facilities for interior modifications. It is based at Tredogan near Rhoose in the Vale of Glamorgan. BAMC employs in excess of 650 people, in three main departments:

- Production
- Planning & Materials
- Compliance

Other BA operations in the area included British Airways Avionic Engineering at Pontyclun, Rhondda Cynon Taff, and British Airways Interiors Engineering in Blackwood, Caerphilly. In 2022 all three subsidiaries were brought under one roof at the BAMC facility at Cardiff airport and was renamed to British Airways Engineering Wales (BAEW).
