= British Airways =

Flag carrier airline of the United Kingdom

British Airways plc

- A British Airways Airbus A350-1000
IATA	ICAO	Call sign
BA	BAW; SHT	SPEEDBIRD; SHUTTLE
- Founded: 31 March 1974
- AOC #: 441
- Hubs: London–Gatwick; London–Heathrow
- Frequent-flyer program: The British Airways Club (Part of the Avios Loyalty program)
- Alliance: Oneworld
- Subsidiaries: BA CityFlyer; BA EuroFlyer
- Fleet size: 254
- Destinations: 215
- Parent company: International Airlines Group
- Headquarters: Waterside; London, England
- Key people: Sean Doyle (chairman & CEO)
- Revenue: ▲£14.6 billion (2024)
- Operating income: ▲£2.0 billion (2024)
- Net income: ▲£2.7 billion (2024)
- Employees: ▲40,521 (2024)
- Website: britishairways.com

British Airways plc (BA) is the flag carrier airline of the United Kingdom, based in London, England. It is headquartered at the Waterside building, adjacent to its main hub at Heathrow Airport.

The airline is the second largest UK-based carrier, based on fleet size and passengers carried, behind easyJet. In January 2011, BA merged with Iberia, creating the International Airlines Group (IAG), a holding company registered in Madrid, Spain. British Airways was the first passenger airline to generate more than US$1 billion on a single air route in a year. (Note: The time period was from 1 April 2017 to 31 March 2018 on the New York-JFK – London-Heathrow route.)

In 1972 a British Airways Board was established by the Government of the United Kingdom to manage the two nationalised airline corporations, British Overseas Airways Corporation and British European Airways, and two regional airlines, Cambrian Airways and Northeast Airlines. On 31 March 1974, all four companies were merged to form British Airways. BA was privatised in February 1987 as part of a wider privatisation plan by the Thatcher government. The carrier expanded with the acquisition of British Caledonian in 1987, Dan-Air in 1992, TAT European Airlines in 1993 and British Midland International in 2012.

The company has received public support, including a bailout equivalent to £300 million during the COVID-19 crisis. After the bailout, the company was a recipient of funding through the UK's furlough scheme, as well as receiving an additional £2 billion in a state backed loan in 2021.

== History ==
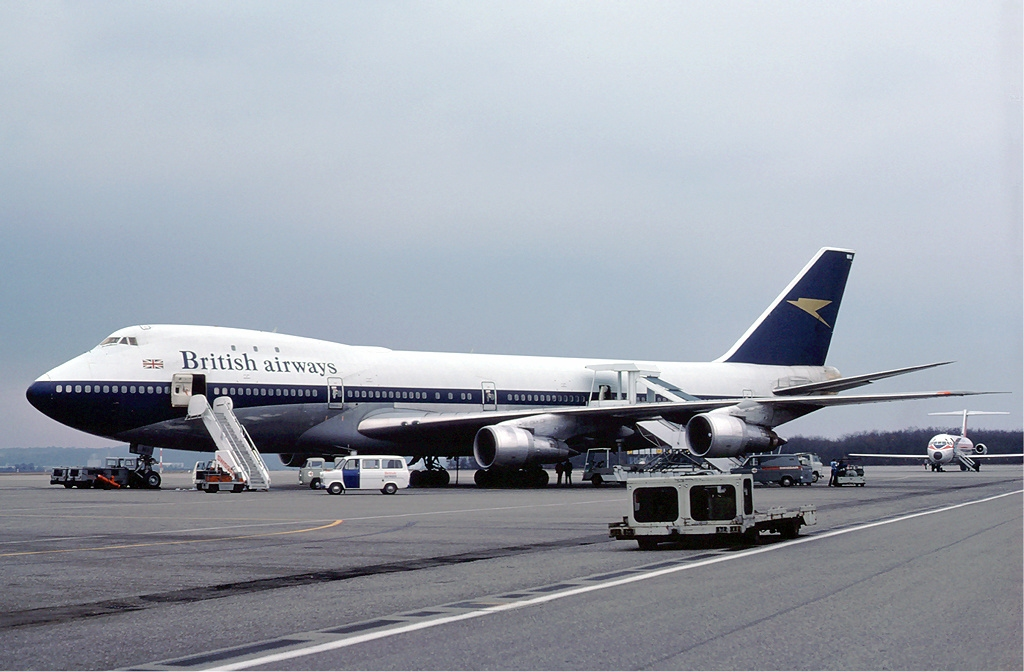
A Boeing 747-100 in BOAC-British Airways transition livery (1976)

The corporate lineage of British Airways goes back to five airlines established in the United Kingdom between 1916 and 1922. The first of these, Aircraft Transport & Travel (AT&T), began the world's first daily international commercial air service from London to Paris on 25 August 1919. The five airlines merged in 1924 and several other airlines were established and merged during the 1930s and 1940s. The mergers and acquisitions resulted in two state-owned airlines, the British Overseas Airways Corporation (BOAC), formed in 1939, and British European Airways (BEA), formed in 1947.

Proposals to establish a single British airline, combining the assets of the BOAC and BEA, were first raised in 1953 as a result of difficulties in attempts by BOAC and BEA to negotiate air rights through the British colony of Cyprus. Increasingly BOAC was protesting that BEA was using its subsidiary Cyprus Airways to circumvent an agreement that BEA would not fly routes further east than Cyprus, particularly to the increasingly important oil regions in the Middle East. The chairman of BOAC, Miles Thomas, was in favour of a merger as a potential solution to this disagreement and had backing for the idea from the Chancellor of the Exchequer at the time, Rab Butler. However, opposition from the Treasury blocked the proposal.

Consequently, it was only following the recommendations of the 1969 Edwards Report that a new British Airways Board, managing both BEA and BOAC, and the two regional British airlines Cambrian Airways based at Cardiff, and Northeast Airlines based at Newcastle upon Tyne, was constituted on 1 April 1972. Although each airline's branding was maintained initially, two years later the British Airways Board unified its branding, effectively establishing British Airways as an airline on 31 March 1974.

Following two years of fierce competition with British Caledonian, the second-largest airline in the United Kingdom at the time, the Government changed its aviation policy in 1976 so that the two carriers would no longer compete on long-haul routes.

British Airways and Air France operated the Concorde, the world's first supersonic aircraft that first carried passengers on 21 January 1976 from London Heathrow to Bahrain. Services to the United States began on 24 May 1976 with a flight to Washington Dulles, and flights to New York JFK followed on 22 September 1977. Service to Singapore was established in co-operation with Singapore Airlines as a continuation of the flight to Bahrain. Following the crash of Air France Flight 4590 and the 11 September attacks, British Airways decided to cease Concorde operations in 2003 after 27 years of service. The final commercial Concorde flight was BA002 from New York-JFK to London-Heathrow on 24 October 2003.

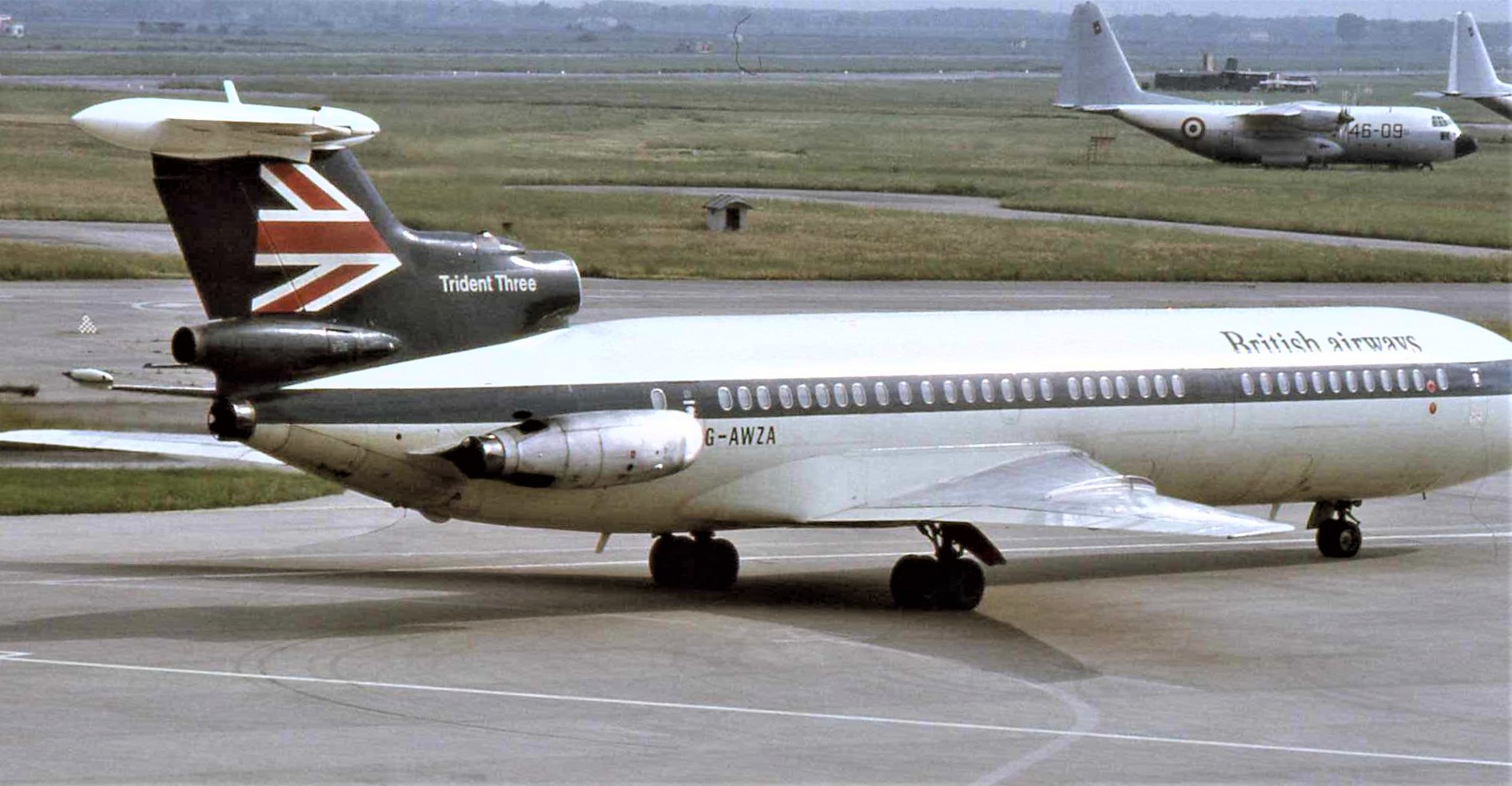
A British Airways Hawker Siddeley Trident in its transitional scheme with BEA livery but with British Airways titles

In 1981 the airline was instructed to prepare for privatisation by the Thatcher government. Sir John King, later Lord King, was appointed chairman, charged with bringing the airline back into profitability. While many other large airlines struggled, King was credited with transforming British Airways into one of the most profitable air carriers in the world. In December 1983, British Airways plc was formed with the government holding all of the shares. BA was privatised and was floated on the London Stock Exchange in February 1987. British Airways effected the takeover of the UK's "second" airline, British Caledonian, in July of that same year.

The formation of Richard Branson's Virgin Atlantic in 1984 created a competitor for BA. The intense rivalry between British Airways and Virgin Atlantic culminated in the former being sued for libel in 1993, arising from claims and counterclaims over a dirty tricks campaign against Virgin. This campaign included allegations of poaching Virgin Atlantic customers, tampering with private files belonging to Virgin, and undermining Virgin's financial reputation in the city. As a result of the case BA management apologised "unreservedly", and the company agreed to pay £110,000 in damages to Virgin, £500,000 to Branson personally and £3 million legal costs. Lord King stepped down as chairman in 1993 and was replaced by his deputy, Colin Marshall, while Bob Ayling took over as CEO. Virgin filed a separate action in the U.S. that same year regarding BA's domination of the trans-Atlantic routes, but it was thrown out in 1999.

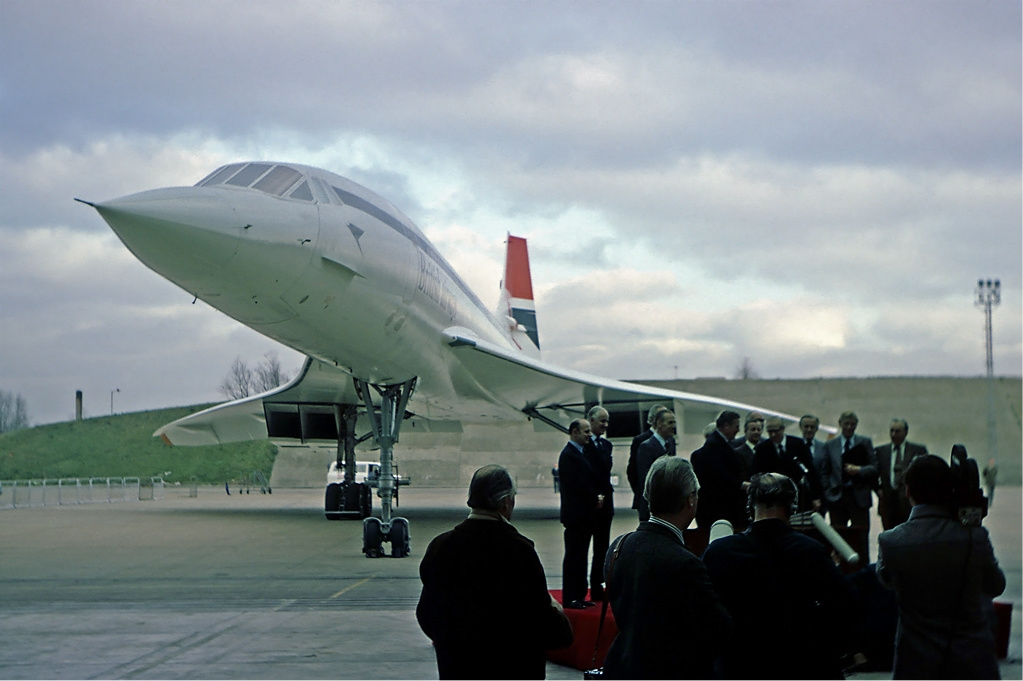
British Airways' first Concorde at Heathrow Airport, on 15 January 1976

In 1992 British Airways expanded through the acquisition of the financially troubled Dan-Air, giving BA a much larger presence at Gatwick Airport. In January 1993 it purchased a 49% shareholding in TAT European Airlines.

British Asia Airways was formed in March 1993 to operate between London and Taipei. That same month BA purchased a 25% stake in Qantas and, with the acquisition of Brymon Airways in May, formed British Airways Citiexpress (later BA Connect).

In 1996 BA took up an option to purchase the remaining 51% in TAT European Airlines and acquired a $67 stake in Air Liberte.

In September 1998, British Airways, along with American Airlines, Canadian Airlines, Cathay Pacific and Qantas, formed the Oneworld airline alliance. Oneworld began operations on 1 February 1999, and is the third-largest airline alliance in the world, behind SkyTeam and Star Alliance.

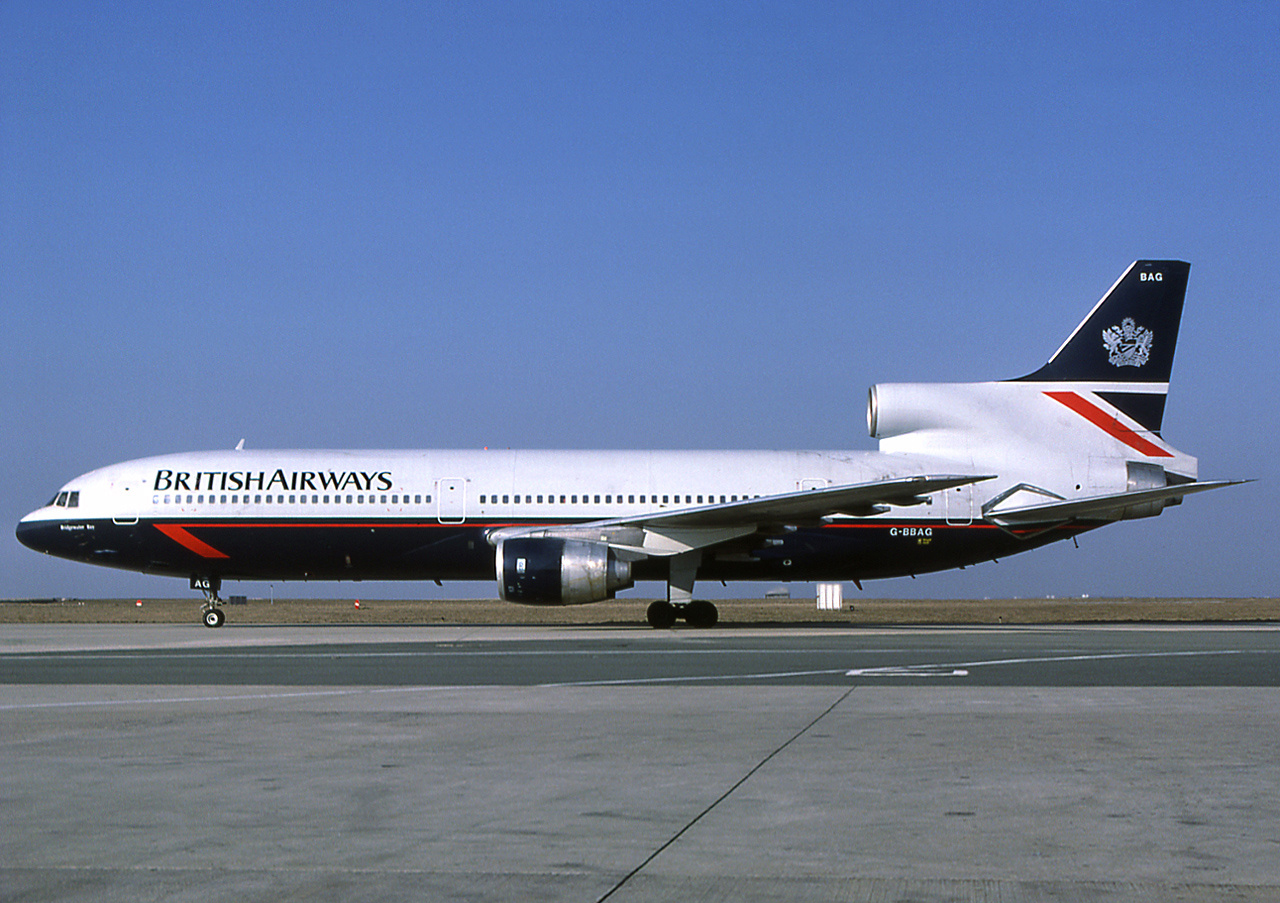
A British Airways Lockheed L-1011 TriStar in Landor livery

Bob Ayling's leadership led to a cost savings of £750 million and the establishment of a budget airline, Go, in 1998. The next year, however, British Airways reported an 84% drop in profits in its first quarter alone, its worst in seven years. In March 2000, Ayling was removed from his position and British Airways announced Rod Eddington as his successor. That year, British Airways and KLM conducted talks on a potential merger, reaching a decision in July to file an official merger plan with the European Commission. The plan fell through in September 2000. British Asia Airways ceased operations in 2001 after BA suspended flights to Taipei. Go was sold to a management buyout backed by 3i in June 2001. Eddington would make further workforce cuts due to reduced demand following 11 September attacks in 2001, and BA sold its stake in Qantas in September 2004. In 2005 Willie Walsh, managing director of Aer Lingus and a former pilot, became the chief executive officer of British Airways. BA unveiled its new subsidiary OpenSkies in January 2008, taking advantage of the liberalisation of transatlantic traffic rights between Europe and the United States. OpenSkies flies non-stop from Paris to New York's JFK and Newark airports.

In July 2008, British Airways announced a merger plan with Iberia, another flag carrier airline in the Oneworld alliance, wherein each airline would retain its original brand. The agreement was confirmed in April 2010, and in July the European Commission and United States Department of Transportation permitted the merger and began to co-ordinate transatlantic routes with American Airlines. On 6 October 2010 the alliance between British Airways, American Airlines and Iberia formally began operations. The alliance generates an estimated £230 million in annual cost-saving for BA, in addition to the £330 million which would be saved by the merger with Iberia. This merger was finalised on 21 January 2011, resulting in the establishment of International Airlines Group (IAG), the world's third-largest airline in terms of annual revenue and the second-largest airline group in Europe. Prior to merging, British Airways owned a 13.5% stake in Iberia, and thus received ownership of 55% of the combined International Airlines Group; Iberia's other shareholders received the remaining 45%. As a part of the merger, British Airways ceased trading independently on the London Stock Exchange after 23 years as a constituent of the FTSE 100 Index.

In September 2010 Willie Walsh, now CEO of IAG, announced that the group was considering acquiring other airlines and had drawn up a shortlist of twelve possible acquisitions. In November 2011 IAG announced an agreement in principle to purchase British Midland International from Lufthansa. A contract to purchase the airline was agreed the next month, and the sale was completed for £172.5 million on 30 March 2012. The airline established a new subsidiary based at London City Airport operating Airbus A318s.

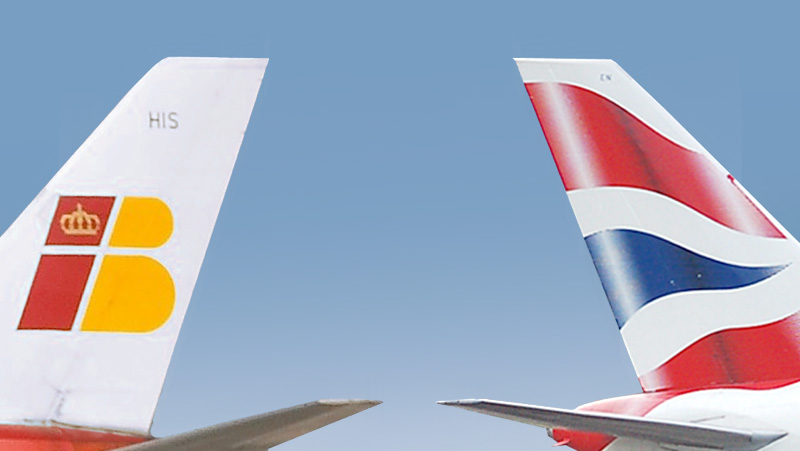
British Airways and Iberia merged in January 2011, forming International Airlines Group, one of the world's largest airlines.

British Airways was the official airline partner of the 2012 Summer Olympics. On 18 May 2012 it flew the Olympic flame from Athens International Airport to RNAS Culdrose while carrying various dignitaries.

On 27 May 2017, British Airways suffered a computer power failure. All flights were cancelled and thousands of passengers were affected. By the following day, the company had not succeeded in reestablishing the normal function of its computer systems. When asked by reporters for more information on the ongoing problems, British Airways stated "The root cause was a power supply issue which our affected our IT systems – we continue to investigate this" and declined to comment further. Willie Walsh later attributed the crash to an electrical engineer disconnecting the UPS and said there would be an independent investigation.

Amidst the decline in the value of Iranian currency due to the reintroduction of U.S. sanctions on Iran, BA announced that the Iranian route was "not commercially viable" and ended services to Iran on 22 September 2018.

In 2018, British Airways partnered with British tailor and designer Ozwald Boateng to redesign the company's historic uniforms, in honour of its approaching centenary, creating a new look for BA, while adhering to its traditional style. The new collection "A British Original" was launched in 2023.

In 2019, as part of the celebration of its centenary of airline operations, staffed dressed in heritage uniforms dating back to the 1930s to greet Queen Elizabeth II and British Airways announced that four aircraft would receive retro liveries. The first of these is a Boeing 747-400 (G-BYGC), which was repainted into the former BOAC livery, which it retained until its retirement. Two more Boeing 747-400s were repainted with former British Airways liveries. One wore the Landor livery until its retirement in 2020 (G-BNLY), the other (G-CIVB), wore the original "Union Jack" livery until its retirement in 2020 also. An Airbus A319 was repainted into British European Airways livery, which is still flying as G-EUPJ.

On 12 October 2020, it was announced that Sean Doyle, CEO of Aer Lingus (also part of the IAG airline group) would succeed Álex Cruz as CEO. On 28 April 2020, the company set out plans to make up to 12,000 staff redundant because of the global collapse of air traffic due to the COVID-19 pandemic and that it may not reopen its operations at Gatwick airport. On 28 July 2020, the company's cabin crew union issued an "industrial action" warning in order to prevent the 12,000 job cuts and pay cuts. They reopened at Gatwick in March 2022.

In July 2020, British Airways announced the immediate retirement of its entire 747-400 fleet, having originally intended to phase out the remaining 747s in 2024. The airline stated that its decision to bring forward the date was in part due to the downturn in air travel following the COVID-19 pandemic and to focus on incorporating more modern and fuel-efficient aircraft such as the Airbus A350 and Boeing 787. At the same time, British Airways also announced its intention to eliminate carbon emissions by 2050.

In January 2026, British Airways Chief Commercial Officer Colm Lac was one of the business representatives from the financial sector to accompany UK Prime Minister Starmer in his meet with Chinese President Xi Jinping and Premier Li Qiang on Thursday to discuss trade, investment and national security.

== Corporate affairs ==
=== Customer relations ===
British Airways has a reputation for poor service, including poor treatment by staff, frequent changes to its offerings, and an unwillingness to pay compensation claims. In 2025, the airline was named worst in long-haul flights, based on a customer survey by the consumer group, Which?. Increasingly the firm has focused on its consumers in more expensive classes, opposed to economy flyers. This shift began slowly in 2020, as a result of a corporate redirection, led by current CEO Sean Doyle with a vision to expand the company's premium offerings. The company then announced suddenly in 2025 that they would change their loyalty point system for frequent flyers, inciting public backlash as many customers lost accrued value in points. The company was forced to reverse course on some of its strategic offerings, only for premium customers, after customer complaints.

In recent years, the firm has been noted publicly for its inability to respond to customer requests. During a recent power outage, the company's website stated that no flights were delayed, despite several cancellations occurring with passengers stranded on planes. In May 2025, A BBC journalist was incorrectly boarded on their flight by staff under a different name, causing her return journey to be cancelled. This exposed security failures present in the airline's practices.

=== Business trends ===
The key trends for British Airways are shown below.

On the merger with Iberia, the accounting reference date was changed from 31 March to 31 December; figures below are therefore for the years to 31 March up to 2010, for the nine months to 31 December 2010, and for the years to 31 December thereafter:

Year	Turnover (£ bn)	Net profit (£ m)	Number of employees (FTE) (Note: on average)	Number of passengers (m)	Passenger load factor (%)	Number of aircraft (Note: at year end)	Ref.
2008 Mar	8.7	694	41,745	34.6	79.1	245	
2009 Mar	8.9	−358	41,473	33.1	77.0	245	
2010 Mar	7.9	−425	37,595	31.8	78.5	238	
2010 (Note: only 9 months)	6.6	170	35,778	24.1	78.5	240	
2011	9.9	672	36,164	34.2	78.2	245	
2012	10.8	84	38,761	37.6	79.9	273	
2013	11.4	281	38,592	39.9	81.3	278	
2014	11.7	702	39,710	41.5	81.0	279	
2015	11.3	975 (Note: After deconsolidation of AGL)	39,309	43.3	81.5	284	
2016	11.4	1,345	39,024	44.5	81.2	293	
2017	12.2	1,447	38,347	45.2	81.8	293	
2018	13.0	2,091	38,202	46.8	82.5	294	
2019	13.2	1,109	38,230	47.7	83.6	305	
2020	4.0	−3,489	33,898	12.2	61.4	277	
2021	3.6	−1,648	26,890	10.3	58.3	276	
2022	11.0	61	33,644	33.0	79.9	276	
2023	14.3	1,161	37,401	43.0	83.6	284	
2024	14.5	2,699	40,521	46.2	85.2	293	
2025	14.6	1,938	41,908	46.3	83.8	298	

In 2020, due to the crisis caused by the COVID-19 pandemic, British Airways had to reduce its 42,000-strong workforce by 12,000 jobs. According to the estimate by IAG, a parent company, it will take the air travel industry several years to return to previous performance and profitability levels.

However, 2022 saw a dramatic increase in travel, and the company now faced a worker shortage, forcing it to cancel more than 1,500 flights. During February 2023, The international airlines group, the owners of British Airways announced that the group has returned to making an annual profit of €1.3 billion for the first time since the pandemic, following a €2.8 billion loss in 2021. The company warned that due to the surge in demand for flying this could lead to more disruption.

=== Operations ===
British Airways is the largest airline based in the United Kingdom in terms of fleet size, international flights, and international destinations and was, until 2008, the largest airline by passenger numbers. The airline carried 34.6 million passengers in 2008, but, rival carrier easyJet transported 44.5 million passengers that year, passing British Airways for the first time. British Airways holds a United Kingdom Civil Aviation Authority Type A Operating Licence, it is permitted to carry passengers, cargo, and mail on aircraft with 20 or more seats.

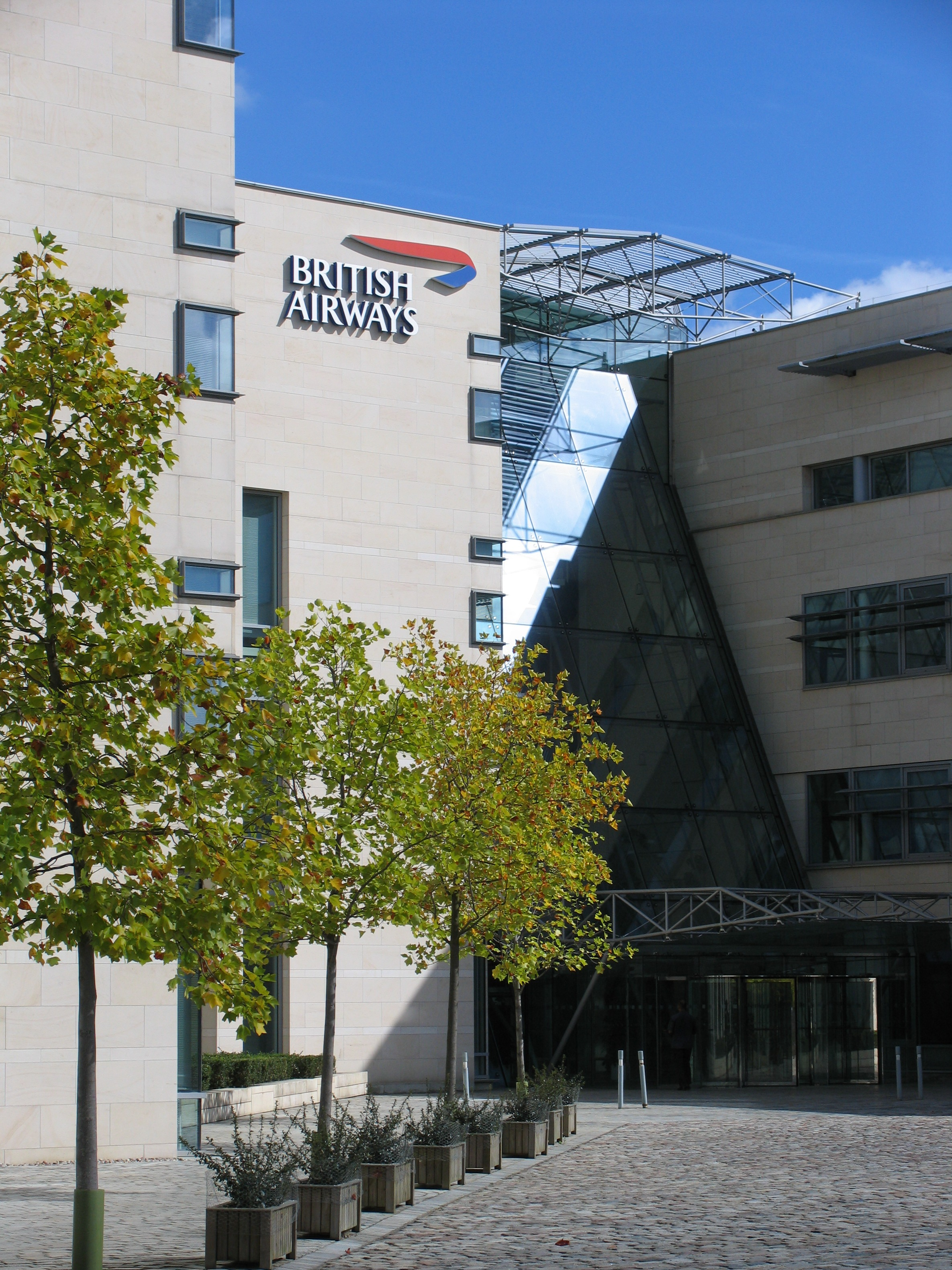
Waterside, the head office building of British Airways

The airline's head office, Waterside, is located in Harmondsworth, a village near Heathrow Airport. Waterside was completed in June 1998 to replace British Airways' previous head office, Speedbird House, located on the grounds of Heathrow.

British Airways' main base is at Heathrow Airport, but it also has a major presence at Gatwick Airport. It also has a base at London City Airport, where its subsidiary BA CityFlyer is the largest operator. BA had previously operated a significant hub at Manchester Airport. Manchester to New York (JFK) services were withdrawn; later all international services outside London ceased when the subsidiary BA Connect was sold. Passengers wishing to travel internationally with BA either to or from regional UK destinations must now transfer in London. Heathrow Airport is dominated by British Airways, which owns 50% of the slots available at the airport as of 2019, growing from 40% in 2004. The majority of BA services operate from Terminal 5, with the exception of some flights at Terminal 3 owing to insufficient capacity at Terminal 5. At London City Airport, the company owns 52% of the slots as of 2019.

In August 2014, Willie Walsh advised the airline would continue to use flight paths over Iraq despite the hostilities there. A few days earlier Qantas announced it would avoid Iraqi airspace, while other airlines did likewise. The issue arose following the downing of Malaysia Airlines Flight 17 over Ukraine, and a temporary suspension of flights to and from Ben Gurion Airport during the 2014 Israel–Gaza conflict.

=== Subsidiaries ===
Over its history, BA has had many subsidiaries. In addition to the below, British Airways also owned Airways Aero Association, the operator of the British Airways flying club based at Wycombe Air Park in High Wycombe, until it was sold to Surinder Arora in 2007.

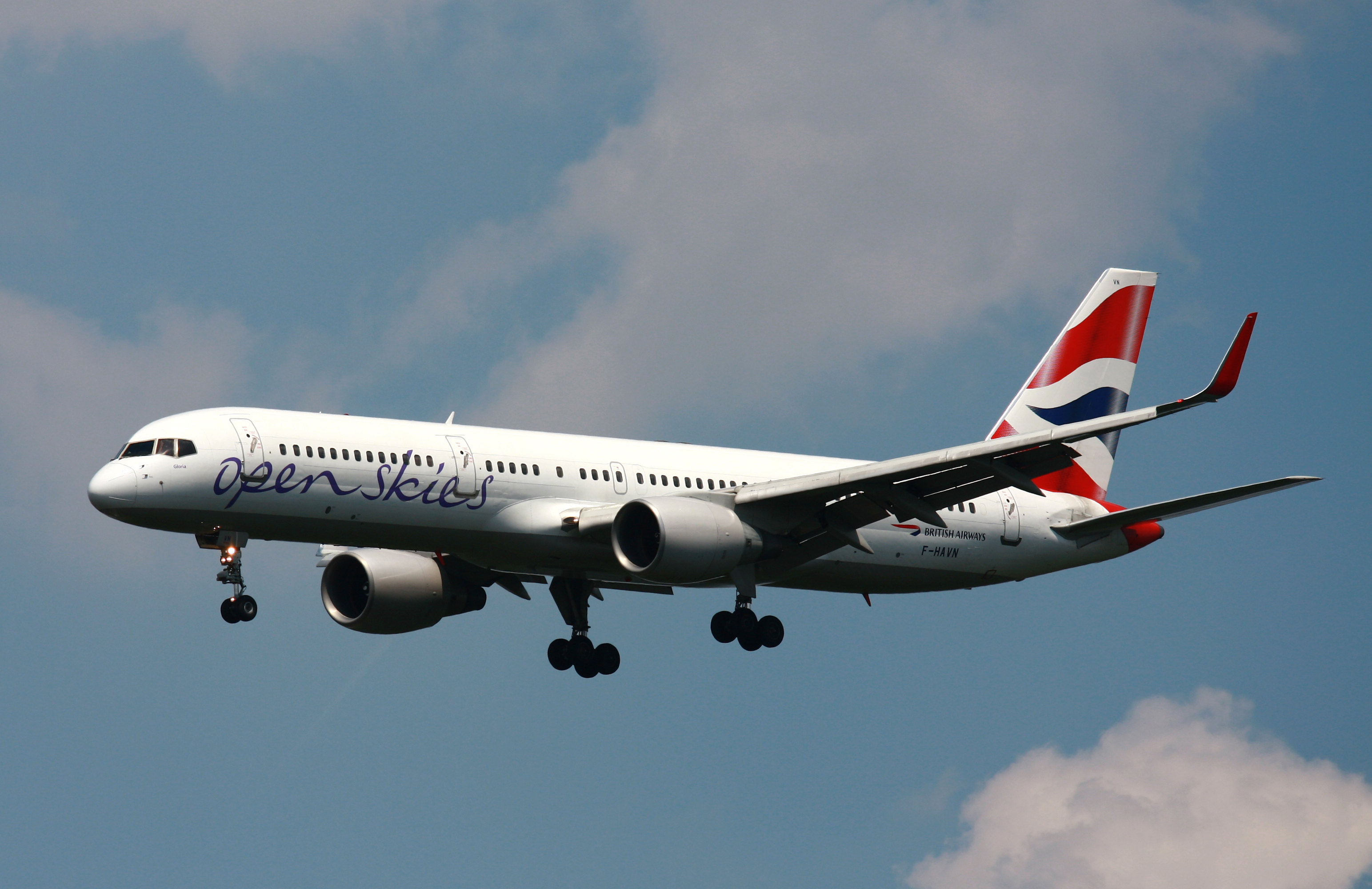
An OpenSkies Boeing 757-200

Airline	Still owned by BA	Current status	Details
BA CityFlyer	Yes	Active	Founded 25 March 2007 as a reforming of the former subsidiary CityFlyer Express with assets of BA Connect not sold to Flybe.
British Airways Engineering	Yes	Active	Responsible for the maintenance, repair, and overhaul of British Airways' aircraft. BAE was formed from the merger of the engineering divisions of BOAC and BEA's when the two airlines merged in 1974 to form British Airways.
British Airways World Cargo	No	Merged with other IAG cargo subsidiaries to form IAG Cargo	British Airways first opened a World Cargo centre at Heathrow in 1999. The company ended operations on 30 April 2014, having been fully merged into IAG Cargo.
British Airways Helicopters	No	Sold	Sold in 1986 – Now trades as British International Helicopters.
BA Connect	No	Closed	Formerly known as BA CitiExpress. Sold in 2007 to Flybe.
British Asia Airways	No	Closed	Founded in 1993 to enable British Airways to continue operating service to Taiwan despite disputes over the legal status of the Republic of China. Ceased operations in 2001.
OpenSkies	Yes	Reorganised	Founded in 2008. OpenSkies ceased to operate under its own brand after summer 2018 to operate for IAG's new low-cost subsidiary brand Level.
British Airways Limited	No	Closed	Established in 2012 to take over the operation of the premium service between London City Airport and New York-JFK. The flights returned to be directly operated by British Airways plc in 2015. The service was suspended in March 2020 amidst COVID-19, before being cancelled in August 2020.
CityFlyer Express	No	Closed	Formerly a short-haul regional airline founded in 1991 (as Euroworld Airways). In 1993 it became the first British Airways (BA) franchisee operating as British Airways Express. CityFlyer's ownership passed to BA in 1999 when that company bought out the original promoters as well as 3i, the airline's main shareholder at the time. Initially, CityFlyer continued to operate as a separate unit, but it was eventually absorbed into British Airways' mainline short haul operation at Gatwick in 2001.
British Regional Airlines	No	Closed	Founded in March 1991 when Manx Airlines created Manx Airlines Europe in order to expand and fly routes within the United Kingdom. In 1994 Manx Airlines Europe became a franchise carrier for British Airways. In March 2001 British Airways purchased the British Regional Airlines Group (holding company of British Regional Airlines and Manx Airlines) for £78m and merged it with Brymon Airways to create British Airways CitiExpress.
Deutsche BA	No	Closed	Sold in 2008 to Air Berlin where it traded as dba by Air Berlin, before closing down in 2008.
Air Liberté	No	Closed	Purchased Air Liberté together with TAT and inaugurated them under one management. On 5 May 2000, BA sold Air Liberté to a partnership between Taitbout Antibes and Swissair.
BA Euroflyer	Yes	Active	Created in 2022, was established to compete with easyJet at Gatwick by providing a lower cost option to the primary airline.

=== Franchises ===
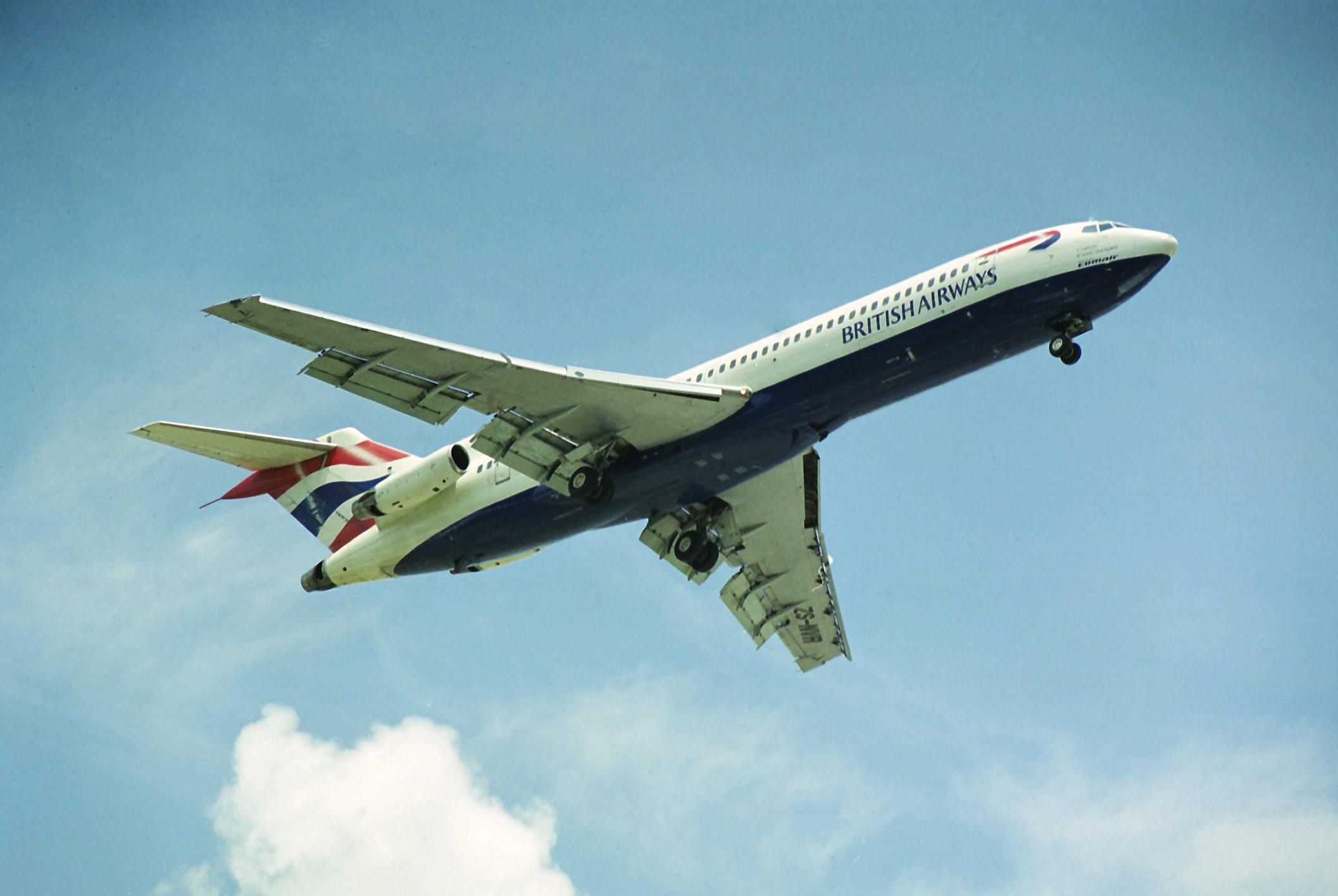
A Comair Boeing 727-230

Airline	Still a BA franchisee	Still operating	Details
Sun-Air of Scandinavia	No	Closed	Founded in 1978. Became a franchisee in 1996. The airline ended all scheduled operations in 2025.
Comair	No	Closed	Founded in 1943. Became a franchisee in 1996. The company entered into voluntary business rescue proceedings on 5 May 2020, due to the impact of the coronavirus pandemic. Operations were suspended on 31 May 2022.
Loganair	No	Active	Founded in February 1962. In 1993, the airline became a franchisee of British Airways, operating its Islanders in the British Airways livery. In July 2008 it became a Flybe franchisee.
Maersk Air UK	No	Closed	Founded in May 1993 as part of the demerger of BEA. It flew from Birmingham Airport to domestic and European destinations as a British Airways franchisee. The airline was sold to its management in 2003 and renamed Duo Airways. It ceased operations in May 2004 when an investor withdrew support at short notice.

=== Shareholdings ===
British Airways obtained a 15% stake in the now-defunct UK regional airline Flybe from the sale of BA Connect in March 2007. It sold the stake in 2014.

BA also owned a 10% stake in InterCapital and Regional Rail (ICRR), the company that managed the operations of Eurostar (UK) Ltd from 1998 to 2010, when the management of Eurostar was restructured.

=== Industrial relations ===
==== 1990s ====
Staff working for British Airways are represented by a number of trade unions. Pilots are represented by British Air Line Pilots' Association, cabin crew by British Airlines Stewards and Stewardesses Association, a branch of Unite the Union; other employees are represented by other Unite the Union branches and the GMB Union.

In 1997, under Bob Ayling, management faced strike action by cabin crew over a £1billion cost-cutting drive to return the airline to profitability. After this strike, in 2009 another cabin crew strike occurred. Staff morale has reportedly been unstable since the 2009 strike. In an effort to increase interaction between management, employees, and the unions, various conferences and workshops have taken place, often with thousands in attendance.

==== 2000s ====
In 2005, wildcat action was taken by union members over a decision by Gate Gourmet not to renew the contracts of 670 workers and replace them with agency staff. The strike was estimated to cost British Airways £30 million, disrupting 100,000 passengers flights. In October 2006, BA became involved in a civil rights dispute when a Christian employee was forbidden to wear a necklace bearing the cross, a religious symbol. While a long-standing employee policy, British politicians such as the former Home Secretary John Reid and the former Foreign Secretary Jack Straw have questioned the policy.

Relations have been turbulent between BA and its largest union, Unite. In 2007, cabin crew threatened strike action over proposed salary changes, but was called off at the last minute. This disagreement resulted in losses of £80 million for the airline. In December 2009, a ballot for strike action over the Christmas holiday period received a high level of support, but action was blocked by a court injunction deeming the ballot illegal.

==== 2010s ====
Negotiations between the parties failed to stop strike action in March 2010. During the strike, British Airways rescinded on employee benefits to those who participated in the strike. The Guardian reported that BA had consulted with outside firms in order undermine the unions: although the story was later withdrawn. Further disruption struck when Derek Simpson, a Unite co-leader, was discovered to have leaked details of confidential negotiations online via Twitter.

Industrial action re-emerged in 2017, this time brought on by flight attendants employed by Mixed Fleet, who received less favourable pay and terms and conditions, compared with cabin staff who joined prior to 2010. A ballot for industrial action was distributed to Mixed Fleet crew in November 2016, resulting in an overwhelmingly majority support for industrial action. Unite described Mixed Fleet crew as on "poverty pay", with many Mixed Fleet flight attendants sleeping in their cars in between shifts because they cannot afford the fuel to drive home, or operating while sick as they cannot afford to call in sick and lose their pay for the shift.

The union demanded BA end its anti-union practice of removing staff travel concessions, bonus payments, and other benefits to cabin crew who undertook industrial action; as well as strike-breaking tactics such as wet-leasing aircraft from other airlines and offering financial incentives for cabin crew not to strike. The first strike dates during the 2016 Christmas holiday were cancelled due to ongoing pay negotiations. Industrial action by Mixed Fleet later started in January 2017, after rejecting the airline's pay offer. Strike action continued throughout 2017, resulting in one of the longest running disputes in aviation history. On October 31 of that year, after 85 days of discontinuous industrial action, Mixed Fleet accepted a new pay deal from BA and ended the strikes.

==== 2020s ====
In the summer of 2022, Unite and GMB union members backed a proposal to strike during the summer holiday at Heathrow airport. Strikes were proposed amid staffing shortages and low wages, as reported by union representatives.

=== Legal issues ===
British Airways has been involved in several class action lawsuits, in addition to other legal disputes. In 2018, the company settled a UK-based class action suit for a data breach. In 2023, the company was required to pay US$1.1 million as the United States government found they refused to pay refunds in a timely manner. British Airways was in violation of the US Department of Transportation rules on refunds for cancelled flights.

=== Senior leadership ===
- Chairman: Sean Doyle (since April 2021)
- Chief executive: Sean Doyle (since October 2020)

== British Airways Holidays ==
British Airways Holidays is a UK‑based tour operator providing holiday packages, hotels, car hire and travel experiences under the British Airways brand.

British Airways Holidays established in 1955 as Overseas Air Travel. It was renamed British Airways Holidays in 1991.

In 2024, British Airways Holidays transferred from British Airways to IAG Loyalty, the subsidiary of International Airlines Group responsible for managing the Avios loyalty currency, and Andrew Flintham was appointed to the business replacing the previous MD. The transfer was reported by independent business media in the context of organisational and leadership changes at British Airways Holidays.

British Airways Holidays sells ATOL‑protected flight‑inclusive holidays via ba.com and British Airways contact centres. According to the UK Civil Aviation Authority ATOL licence holder reports, British Airways Holidays ranks among the largest tour operators in the United Kingdom by authorised passenger volume.

The business is integrated with The British Airways Club loyalty programme. British Airways allows members to use Avios as payment or part‑payment on selected British Airways Holidays packages. Changes to the programme in 2025 saw British Airways Holidays bookings contributing to members’ tier status.

== Destinations ==
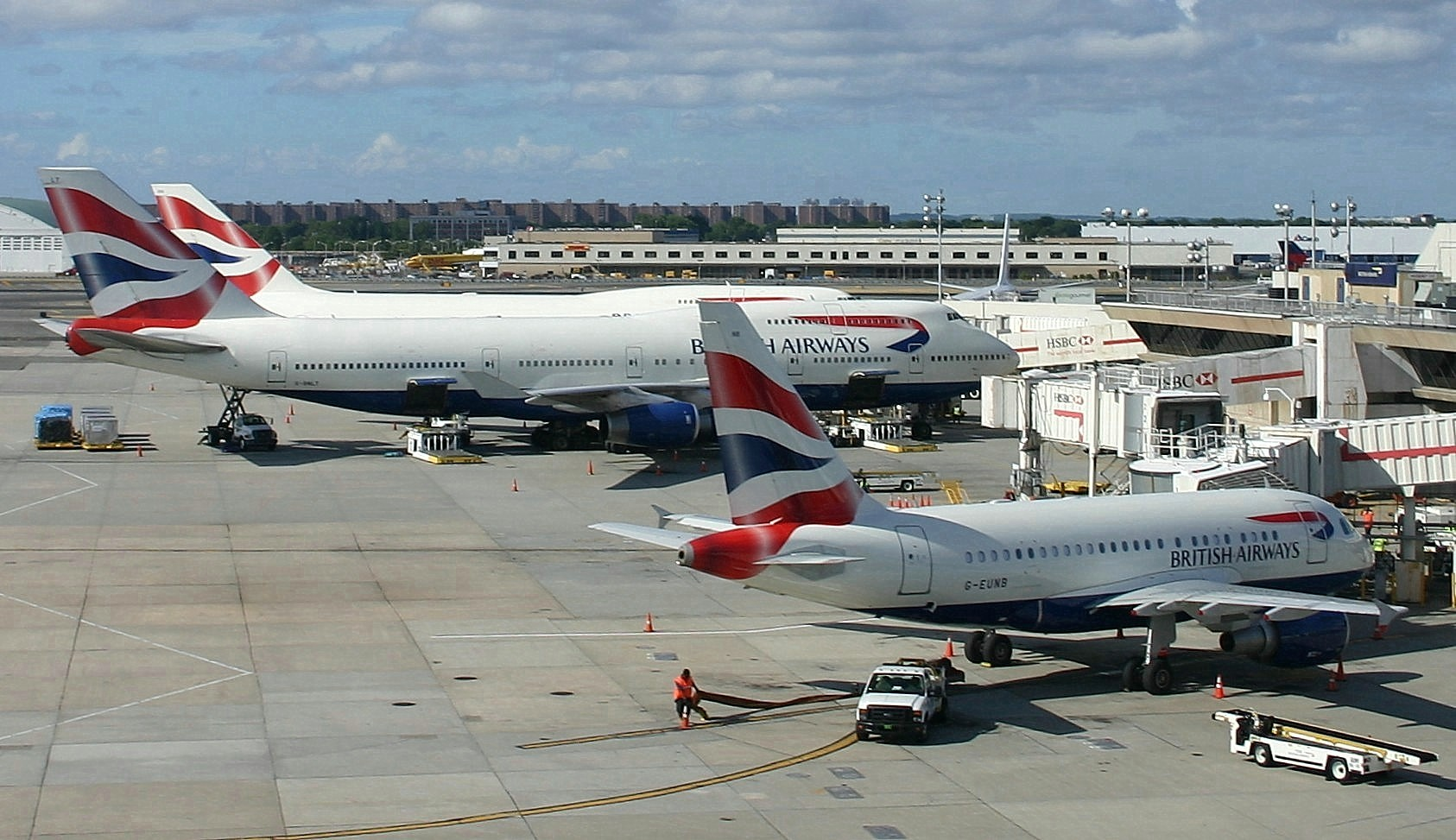
British Airways Airbus A318-100 alongside two Boeing 747-400s at John F. Kennedy International Airport. This aircraft operated the special all-business class Club World London City service between London and New York.

As of August 2022, British Airways serves 70 countries, with eight domestic destinations and 27 destinations in the United States.

=== Alliances ===
British Airways co-founded the airline alliance Oneworld in 1999 with airlines American Airlines, Cathay Pacific and Qantas.

=== Codeshare agreements ===
British Airways has codeshares with the following airlines:

- Aer Lingus
- airBaltic
- Airlink
- Alaska Airlines
- American Airlines
- Bangkok Airways
- Cathay Pacific
- China Eastern Airlines
- China Southern Airlines
- Finnair
- Iberia
- IndiGo
- Japan Airlines
- Kenya Airways
- LATAM Brasil
- LATAM Chile
- Loganair
- Malaysia Airlines
- Porter Airlines
- Qantas
- Qatar Airways
- Royal Air Maroc
- Royal Jordanian
- TAAG Angola Airlines
- Viva
- Vueling

=== Interline agreements ===
British Airways has Interline agreements with the following airlines:

- Royal Brunei Airlines
- Virgin Atlantic

== Fleet ==
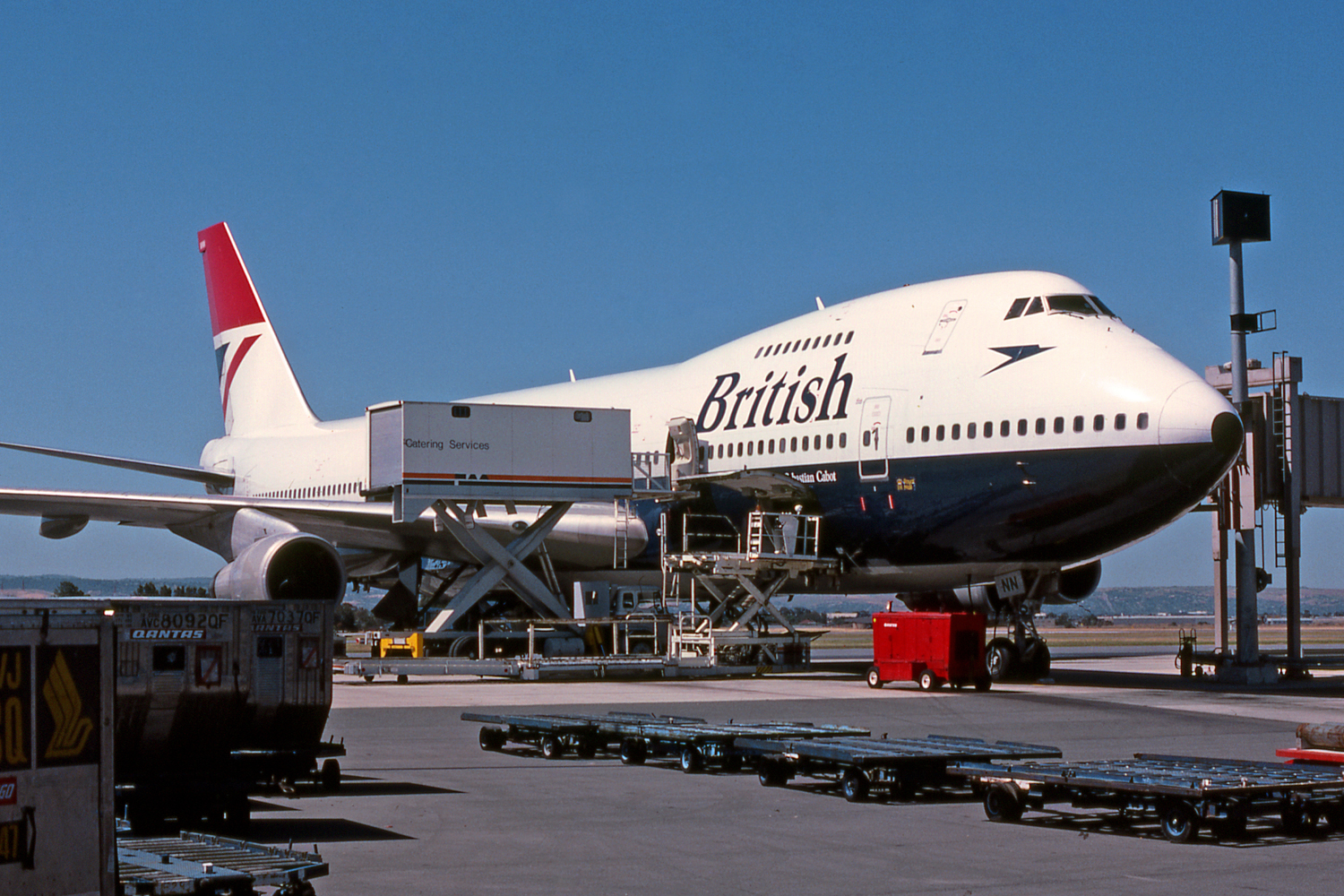
British Airways 747-136 at Adelaide Airport, Australia (1984). This aircraft adorns the former 'Negus' livery, which was in use from 1974 till 1985.

As of February 2025, the British Airways operates a fleet of 274 aircraft with 42 orders. BA operates a mix of Airbus narrow and wide-body aircraft, Boeing wide-body aircraft, specifically the 777, 787 and Embraer E-Jet family a narrow-body, short- to medium-range, twin-engined regional aircraft airliners, specifically the Embraer E190. In October 2020, British Airways retired its fleet of 747-400 aircraft. It was one of the largest operators of the 747, having previously operated the -100, -200, and -400 aircraft from 1974 (1969 with BOAC).

=== British Airways Engineering ===
The airline has its own engineering branch to maintain its aircraft fleet, this includes line maintenance at over 70 airports around the world. Amongst the company's various hangar facilities are its two major maintenance centres at Glasgow and Cardiff Airports.

== Marketing ==
=== Branding ===
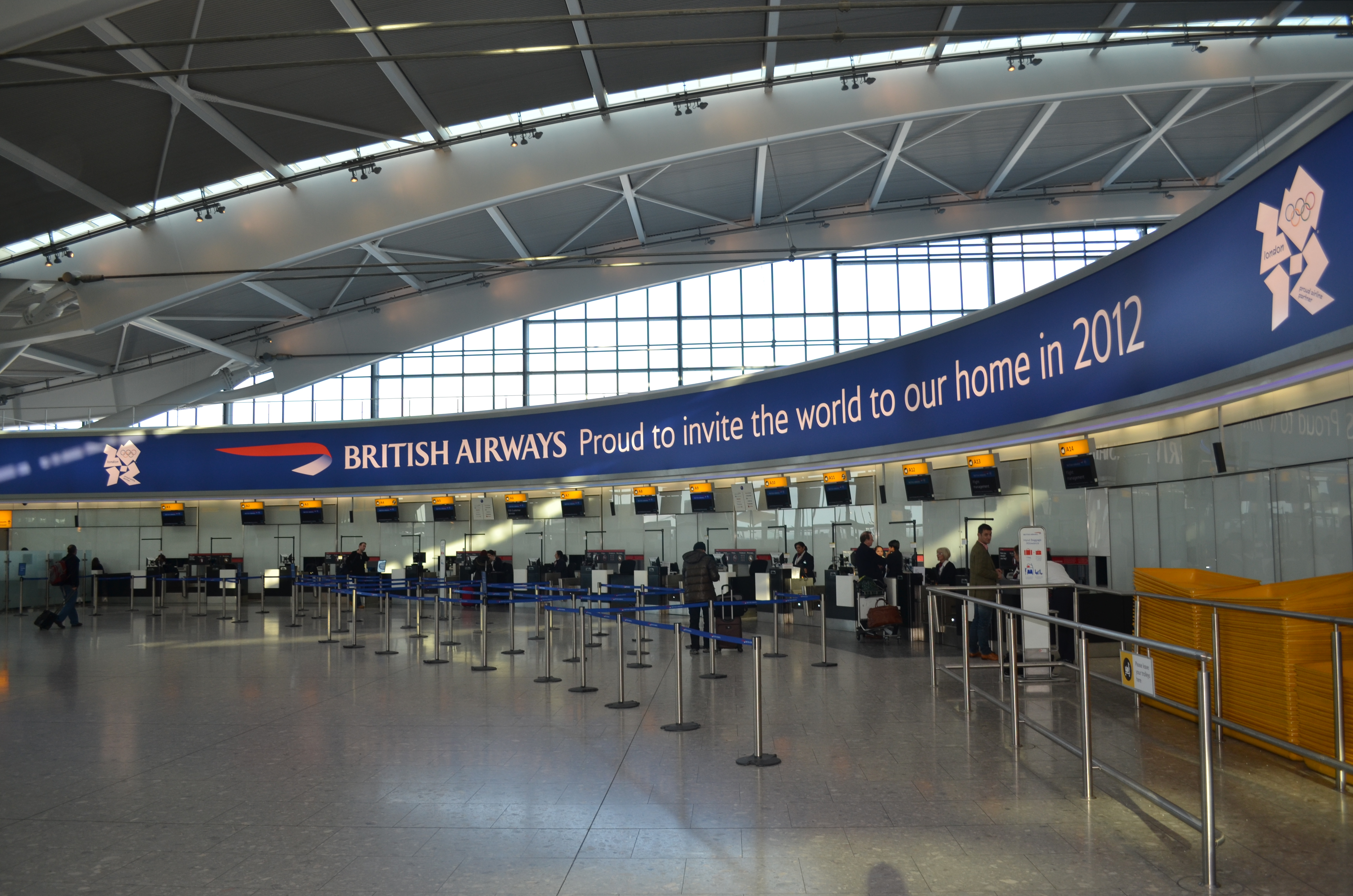
British Airways' promotional banner above the check-in desks at Heathrow Airport's Terminal 5

The musical theme predominantly used on British Airways advertising has been "The Flower Duet" by Léo Delibes. This was first used in a 1984 advertisement directed by Tony Scott, in an arrangement by Howard Blake. It was reworked by Malcolm McLaren and Yanni for 1989's iconic "Face" advertisement, and subsequently appeared in many different arrangements between 1990 and 2010. The slogan 'the world's favourite airline', first used in 1983, was dropped in 2001 after Lufthansa overtook BA in terms of passenger numbers. Other advertising slogans have included "The World's Best Airline", "We'll Take More Care of You", "Fly the Flag", and "To Fly, To Serve".

BA had an account for 23 years with Saatchi & Saatchi, an agency that created many of their most famous advertisements, including "The World's Biggest Offer" and the influential "Face" campaign. Saatchi & Saatchi later imitated this advert for Silverjet, a rival of BA, after BA discontinued their business activities. Since 2007, BA used Bartle Bogle Hegarty as its advertising agency.

In October 2022, BA launched a brand new ad campaign, titled "A British Original" produced by London-based Uncommon Creative Studio. This was to be another record-breaking campaign for its use of 500 unique executions along with a series of 32 short films, coinciding with the launch of Ozwald Boateng's new collection of uniform.

British Airways purchased the internet domain ba.com in 2002 from previous owner Bell Atlantic, 'BA' being the company's initialism and its IATA Airline code.

British Airways is the official airline of the Wimbledon Championship tennis tournament, and was the official airline and tier one partner of the 2012 Summer Olympics and Paralympics. BA was also the official airline of England's bid to host the 2018 Football World Cup.

High Life, founded in 1973, is the official in-flight magazine of the airline.

=== Safety video ===
The airline used a cartoon safety video from circa 2005 until 2017. Beginning on 1 September 2017 the airline introduced the new Comic Relief live action safety video hosted by Chabuddy G, with appearances by British celebrities Gillian Anderson, Rowan Atkinson, Jim Broadbent, Rob Brydon, Warwick Davis, Chiwetel Ejiofor, Ian McKellen, Thandie Newton, and Gordon Ramsay. A "sequel" video, also hosted by Chabuddy G, was released in 2018, with Michael Caine, Olivia Colman, Jourdan Dunn, Naomie Harris, Joanna Lumley, and David Walliams. The two videos are part of Comic Relief's charity programme. On 17 April 2023, the airline launched a new safety video as a part of "A British Original" campaign, with Emma Raducanu, Robert Peston, Little Simz, and Steven Bartlett.

=== Liveries, logos, and tail fins ===
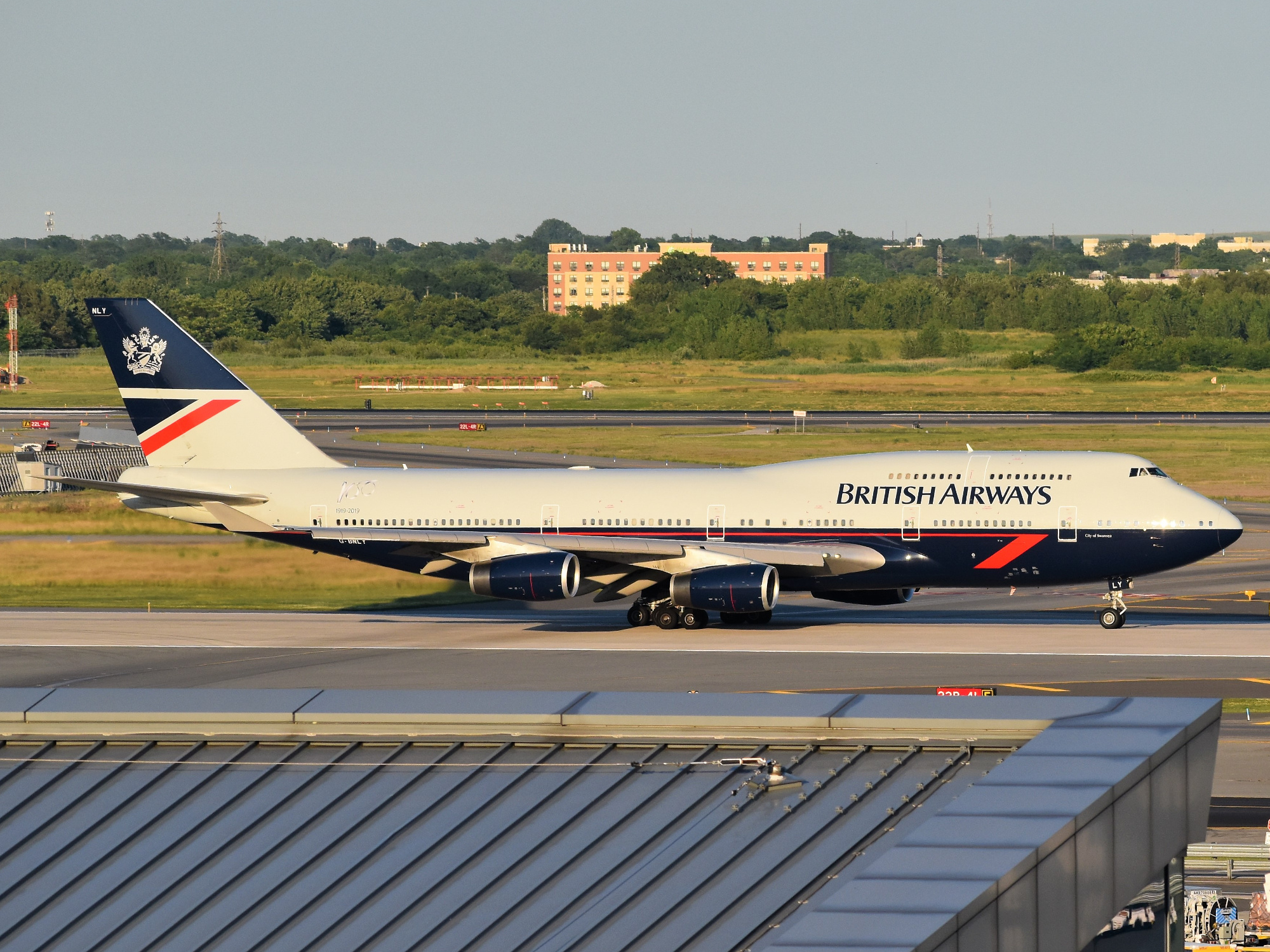
One of the four retro liveries to celebrate the 100th anniversary of British Airways and its predecessors. This Boeing 747-400 aircraft (registered as G-BNLY) is painted in the Landor Associates design.

The aircraft that British Airways inherited from the four-way merger between BOAC, BEA, Cambrian, and Northeast were temporarily given the text logo "British airways" but retained the original airline's livery. With its formation in 1974, British Airways' aeroplanes were given a new white, blue, and red colour scheme with a cropped Union Jack painted on their tail fins, designed by Negus & Negus. In 1984, a new livery designed by Landor Associates updated the airline's look as it prepared for privatisation. To celebrate its centenary in 2019, BA announced four retro liveries: three on Boeing 747-400 aircraft (one in each of BOAC, Negus & Negus, and Landor Associates liveries), and one A319 in BEA livery.

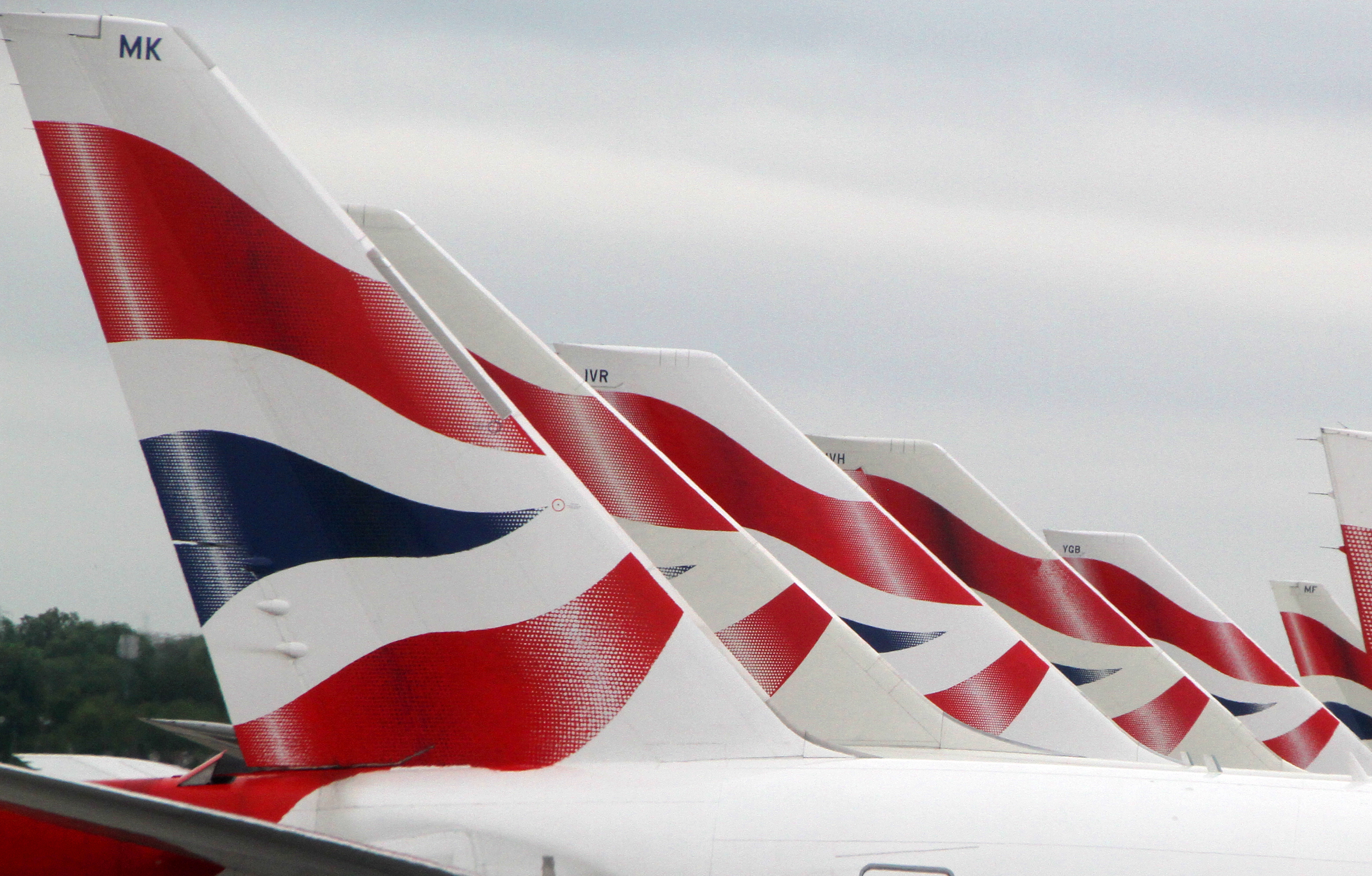
Current BA aircraft bear Chatham Dockyard Union Flag tail art.

In 1997, there was a controversial change to a new Project Utopia livery; all aircraft used the corporate colours consistently on the fuselage, but tailfins bore one of multiple designs. Several people spoke out against the change, including the former prime minister Margaret Thatcher, who famously covered the tail of a model 747 at an event with a handkerchief, to show her displeasure. BA's traditional rival, Virgin Atlantic, took advantage of the negative press coverage by applying the Union flag to the winglets of their aircraft along with the slogan "Britain's national flagcarrier".

In 1999, the CEO of British Airways, Bob Ayling, announced that all BA planes would adopt the tailfin design Chatham Dockyard Union Flag originally intended to be used only on the Concorde, based on the Union Flag.

=== Arms ===
Coat of arms of British Airways
Notes Originally granted to the British Airways Board (1975), transferred to British Airways Plc (1984), exemplified in favour of British Airways Plc pursuant to Royal License (1985). Adopted 1975 Crest On a Wreath of the Colours, rising from an Astral Crown Or, a Sun irradiated proper. Escutcheon Argent between a Chief and a Bendlet sinister coupled Gules, a Gyron issuing from the dexter, the point in sinister chief Azure. Supporters On the Dexter a Pegasus Argent crined, unguled and winged Or, gorged with an Astral Crown Azure, holding in the mouth a sprig of Olive fructed proper; on the Sinister, a Lion guardant winged at the shoulders Or and gorged with an Astral Crown Azure. The whole upon a compartment of a grassy mound proper dimidating water barry wavy Azure and Argent. Motto TO FLY, TO SERVE

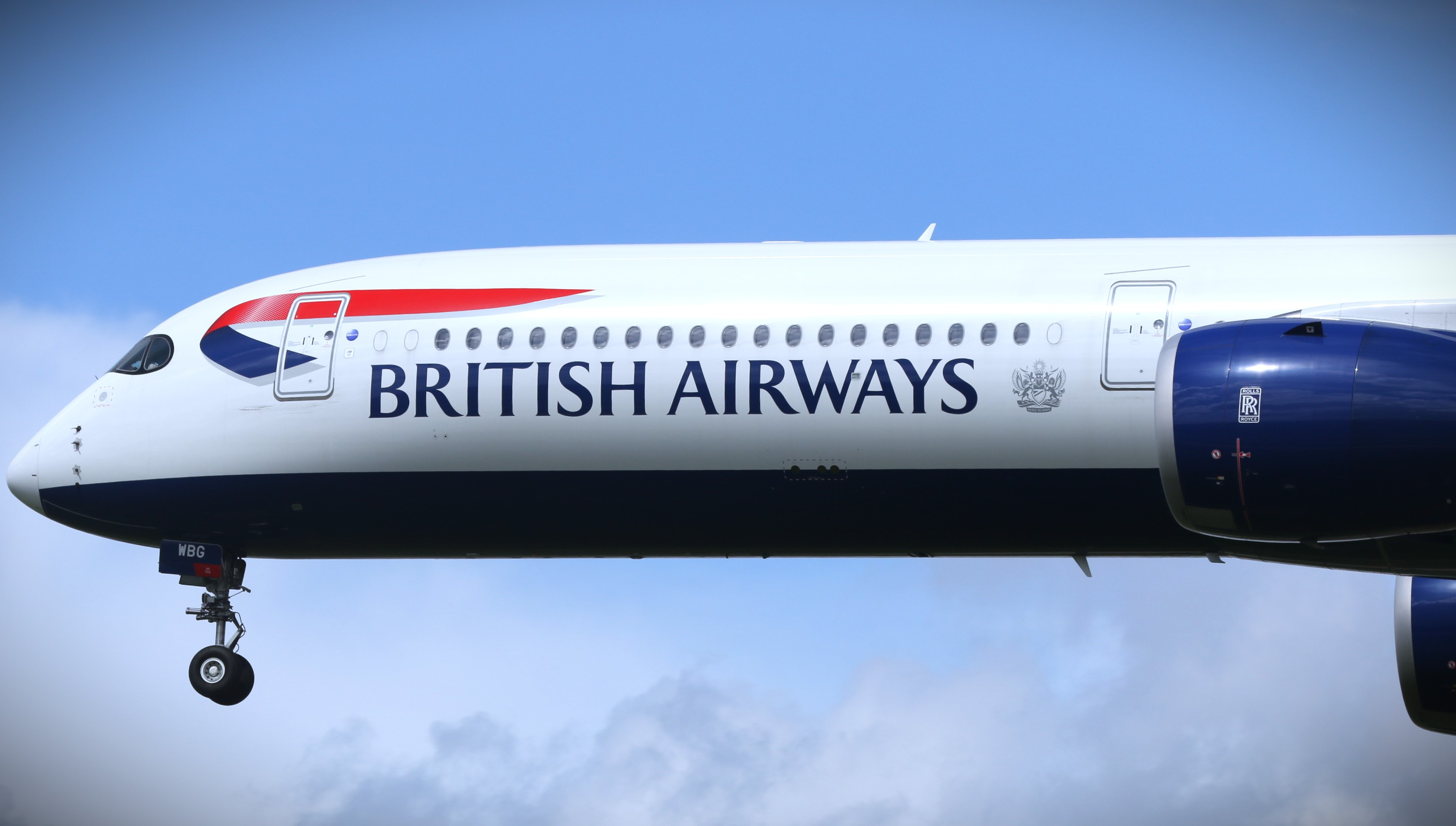
Most British Airways aircraft are decorated with the carrier's Coat of Arms being placed beside the typeface.

In 2011, British Airways made a brand relaunch project, in which BA introduced a stylised, metallic version of the arms by For People Design to be used along with its Speedmarque logo. This is used exclusively on aircraft, First Wing Lounge and advertisements.

In 2024, the damaged letters patent of the arms went up for auction online before being withdrawn.

=== Loyalty programme ===
British Airways' tiered loyalty programme, called the British Airways Club, is a programme designed to incentivise its members to travel on British Airways and other partners, by advertising benefits and awarding members with currency. Members would accrue points called 'Avios' and 'tier points' based on methods permitted by the airline, which included flying on the airline itself. Avios is a currency owned by its parent company International Airlines Group. 'Tier points' are used to determine a member's tier in the programme. Once a member reached a high enough tier by attaining enough 'tier points', they could access airport lounges and dedicated "fast" queues.

Members of the programme were also granted status within the Oneworld alliance, which permitted similar benefits when flying with Oneworld member airlines. The level of benefits were determined by the member's tier.

On 1 April 2025, the programme was rebranded from 'Executive Club' to 'The British Airways Club'. Before the rebrand, 'tier points' were earned based on the airline, distance and cabin class flown. With the 'British Airways Club', 'tier points' are now earned based on absolute spending with the airline (including the fare component and carrier-imposed surcharges, but not Government Taxes or Airport fees such as Air Passenger Duty). 1 'tier point' is awarded per £1 spent. Additional tier points can also be earned through booking a holiday package (flight plus hotel and/or car rental) through British Airways Holidays, or achieving specific spend thresholds on BA's premium American Express credit card.

== Cabins and services ==
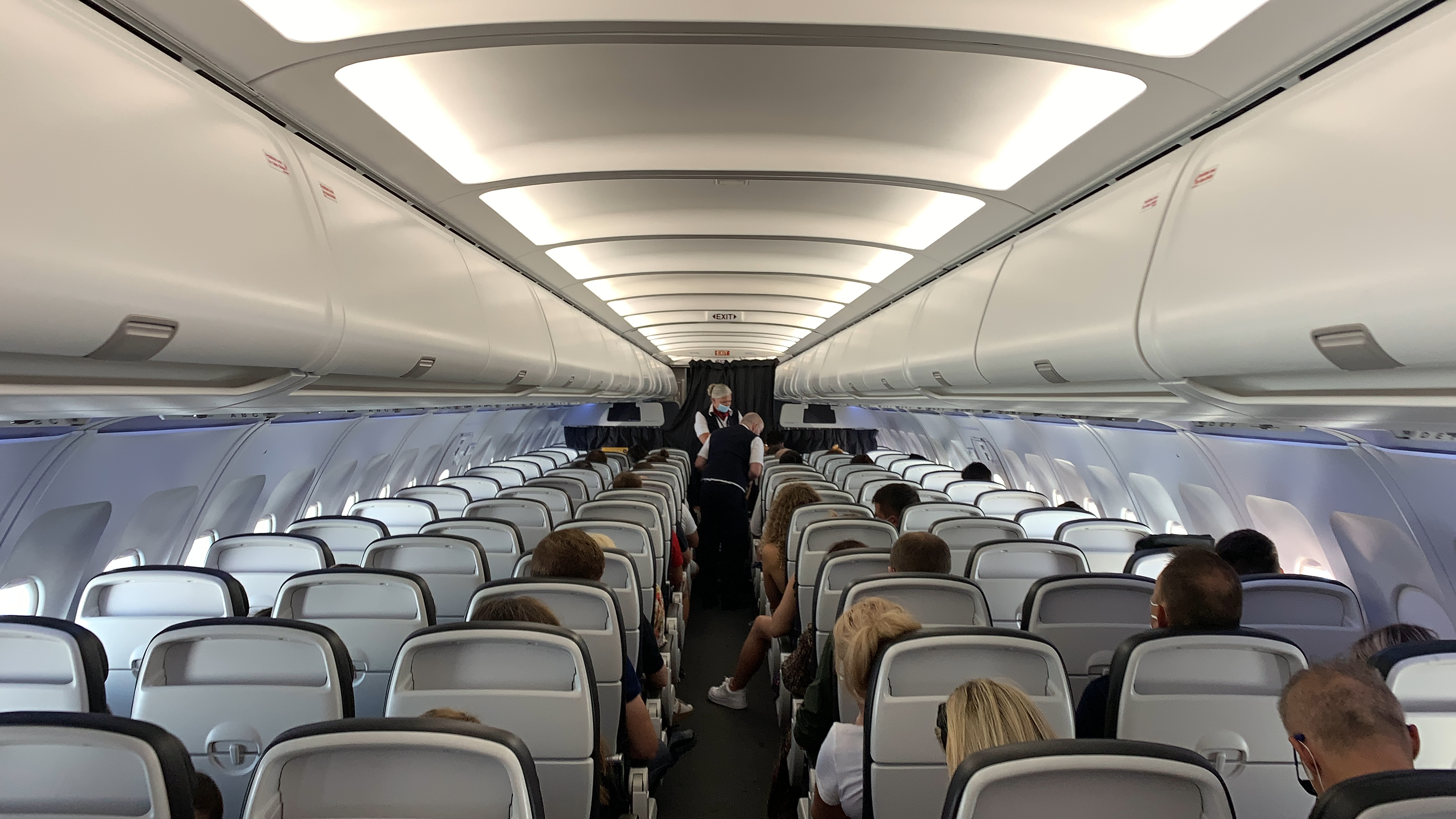
British Airways' Euro Traveller cabin, installed on all of the airline's narrow-body aircraft

=== Short haul ===
Economy class

Euro Traveller is British Airways' economy class cabin on all short-haul flights within Europe, including domestic flights within the UK. Heathrow and Gatwick-based flights are operated by Airbus A320 series aircraft. Seat pitch varies from 78" to 31" depending on aircraft type and location of the seat.

All flights from Heathrow and Gatwick have a buy on board system with a range of food designed by Tom Kerridge. Food can be pre-ordered through the British Airways mobile application. Alternatively, a limited selection can be purchased on-board using credit and debit card or by using Frequent Flyer Avios points. British Airways is rolling out Wi-Fi across its fleet of aircraft with 90% expected to be Wi-Fi enabled by 2020.

Business class

Club Europe is the short-haul business class available on all short-haul flights. This class allows for access to business lounges at most airports and complimentary onboard catering, as well as fast-track security at most airports. The middle seat of the standard Airbus configured cabin is left free. Instead, a cocktail table folds up from under the middle seat on refurbished aircraft.

=== Mid-haul and long-haul ===
First class

First is offered on all Airbus A380s, Boeing 777-300ERs, Boeing 787-9/10s and on some Boeing 777-200ERs. There are between eight and fourteen private suites depending on the aircraft type. Each First suite comes with a 6 ft 6 in (1.98 m) bed, a 15-inch (38 cm) wide entertainment screen, in-seat power and complimentary Wi-Fi access on select aircraft.

The exclusive Concorde Room lounge at Heathrow Terminal 5 is directly accessible via a private door from security, and offers pre-flight dining with waiter service and more intimate space. Dedicated British Airways 'Galleries First' lounges are available at some airports, and Business lounges are used where these are not available. Some feature a 'First Dining' section where passengers holding a first class ticket can access a pre-flight dining service.

Club World

Club World is the long-haul business class cabin. The cabin features fully convertible flat bed seats. In March 2019, BA unveiled its new business-class seats – named Club Suite – on the new A350 aircraft, which feature a suite with a door.

World Traveller Plus

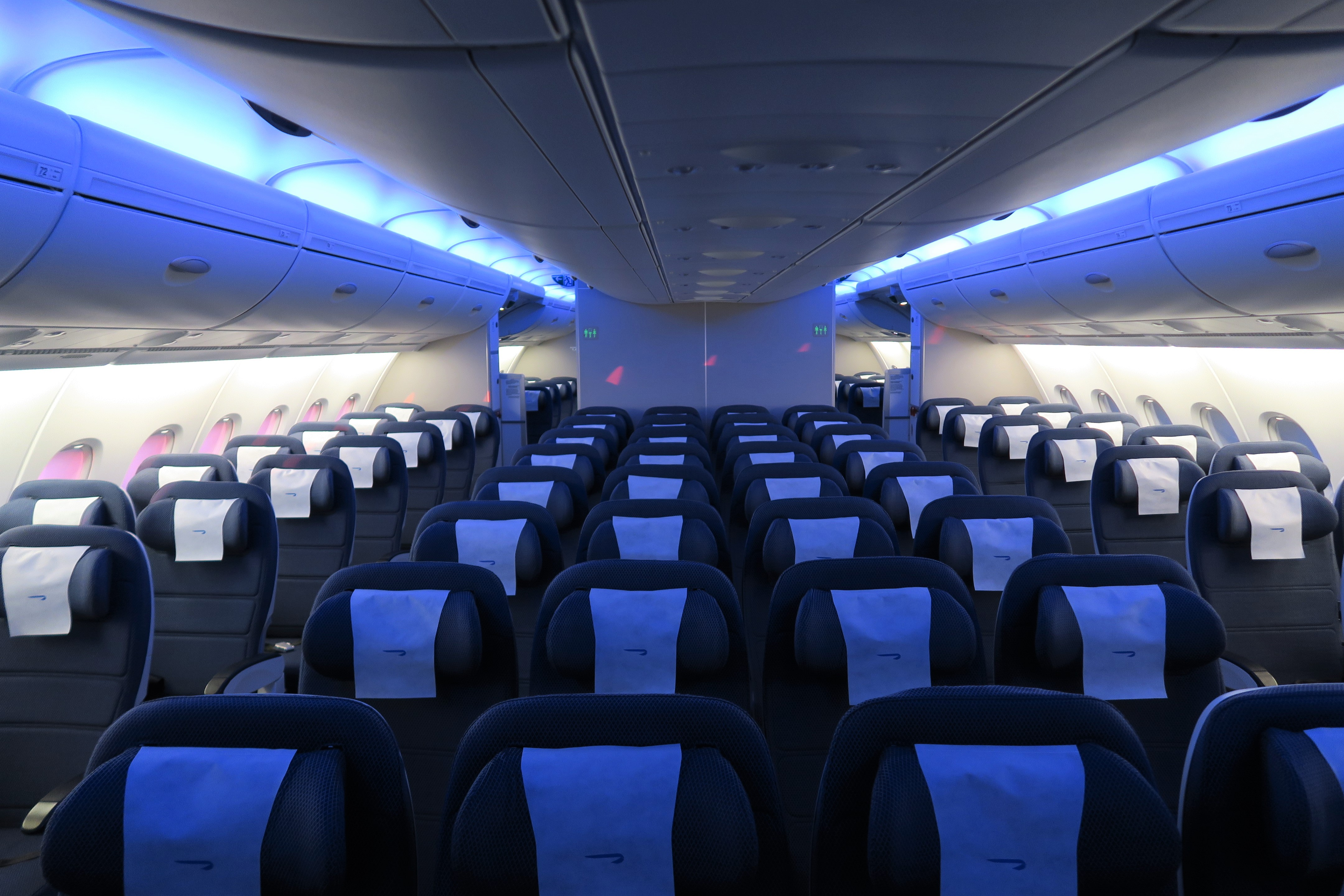
Upper deck of a British Airways Airbus A380, World Traveller cabin

World Traveller Plus is the premium economy class cabin provided on all BA long haul aircraft. This cabin offers wider seats, extended leg-room, additional seat comforts such as larger IFE screen, a foot rest and power sockets. An enhanced food and beverage offering is also a feature of this class. Passengers are given a light refreshment upon boarding and a hot towel shortly after take-off.

World Traveller

World Traveller is the mid-haul and long-haul economy class cabin. It offers seat-back entertainment, complimentary food and drink, pillows, and blankets. While the in-flight entertainment screens are available on all long-haul aircraft, international power outlets are available on the aircraft based at Heathrow. Wifi is also available on selected aircraft at an extra fee.

== Incidents and accidents ==
British Airways is known to have a strong reputation for safety and has been consistently ranked within the top 20 safest airlines globally according to Business Insider and AirlineRatings.com.

Since BA's inception in 1974, it has been involved in three hull-loss incidents (British Airways Flight 149 was destroyed on the ground at Kuwait International Airport as a result of military action during the First Gulf War with no one on board) and two hijacking attempts. To date, the only fatal accident experienced by a BA aircraft occurred in 1976 with British Airways Flight 476 which was involved in a midair collision later attributed to an error made by air traffic control.

- On 23 July 1974, a British Airways flight from Aldergrove Airport to London Heathrow was forced to divert to Manchester Airport after the discovery of an explosive device on board. All passengers and crew were evacuated safely. The Provisional Irish Republican Army (IRA) claimed responsibility for planting the bomb (see 1974 British Airways bombing attempt).
- On 22 November 1974, British Airways Flight 870 was hijacked shortly after take-off from Dubai International Airport for London-Heathrow. The Vickers VC10 landed at Tripoli for refuelling before flying on to Tunis. The captain, Jim Futcher, returned to the aircraft to fly it knowing the hijackers were on board. A hostage, 43-year-old German banker Werner Gustav Kehl, was shot in the back. The hijackers eventually surrendered after 84 hours. Futcher was awarded the Queen's Gallantry Medal, the Guild of Air Pilots and Air Navigators Founders Medal, the British Air Line Pilots Association Gold Medal and a Certificate of Commendation from British Airways for his actions during the hijacking.
- On 10 September 1976, a Trident 3B on British Airways Flight 476 departed from London-Heathrow to Istanbul. It collided in mid-air with an Inex Adria DC9-31 near Zagreb. All 54 passengers and 9 crew members on the BA aircraft died. This is the only fatal accident to a British Airways aircraft since the company's formation in 1974.
- On 24 June 1982, British Airways Flight 9, a Boeing 747-200 registration G-BDXH, flew through a cloud of volcanic ash and dust from the eruption of Mount Galunggung. The ash and dust caused extensive damage to the aircraft, including the failure of all four engines. The crew managed to glide the plane out of the dust cloud and restart all four of its engines, although one later had to be shut down again. The volcanic ash caused the cockpit window to be scratched to such an extent that it was difficult for the pilots to see out of the plane. However, the aircraft made a successful emergency landing at Halim Perdanakusuma International Airport just outside Jakarta. There were no fatalities or injuries.
- On 10 June 1990, British Airways Flight 5390, a BAC One-Eleven flight between Birmingham and Málaga, suffered a windscreen blowout due to the fitting of incorrect bolts the previous day. The captain sustained major injuries after being partially blown out of the aircraft, but the co-pilot landed the plane safely at Southampton Airport.
- On 2 August 1990, British Airways Flight 149 landed at Kuwait International Airport four hours after the Iraqi invasion of Kuwait. The aircraft, a Boeing 747-100 G-AWND, was destroyed, and all passengers and crew were captured. Two of the landing gears were salvaged, and are on display in Waterside, BA Headquarters in London.
- On 23 May 1996, during the initial climb from Delhi Airport, passengers on board a British Airways Boeing 747-200B heard a muffled bang, accompanied by a jolt. The flight was continued without further incident, but upon landing at London Heathrow Airport, inspection of the aircraft found that a panel above the left hand over-wing slide position had broken up from its leading edge, with about 30% of the panel missing.
- On 29 December 2000, British Airways Flight 2069 was en route from London to Nairobi when a mentally ill passenger entered the cockpit and grabbed the controls. As the pilots struggled to remove the intruder, the Boeing 747-400 stalled twice and banked to 94 degrees. Several people on board were injured by the violent manoeuvres, which briefly caused the aircraft to descend at 30,000 ft per minute. The man was finally restrained with the help of several passengers, and the co-pilot regained control of the aircraft. The flight landed safely in Nairobi.

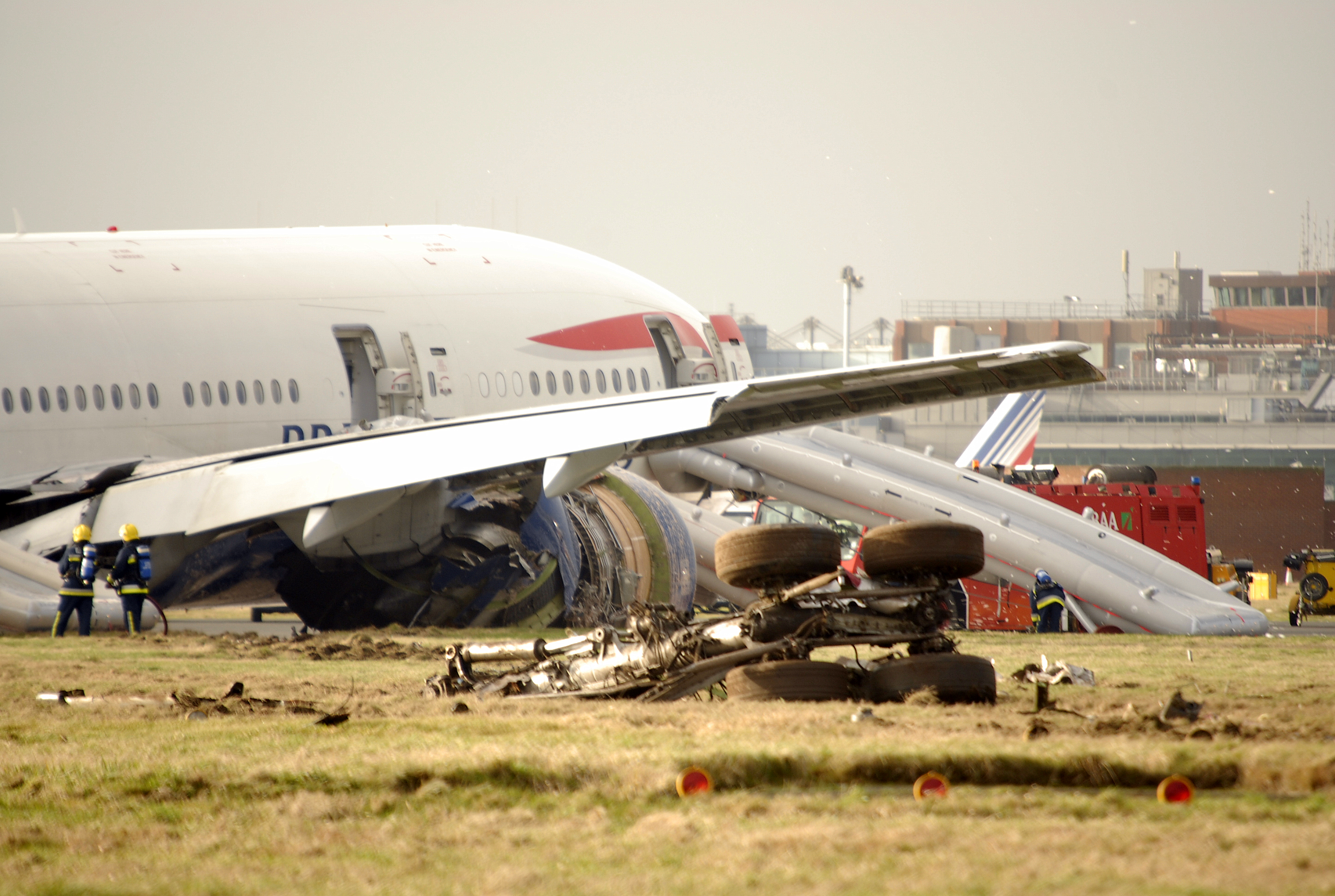
The damaged British Airways Flight 38, photographed on 17 January 2008, the day of the accident

- On 17 January 2008, British Airways Flight 38, a Boeing 777-200ER G-YMMM, from Beijing to London crash-landed approximately 1,000 feet (300 m) short of Heathrow Airport's runway 27L, and slid onto the runway's displaced threshold. The aircraft sustained damage to its landing gear, wing roots, and engines, resulting in the first hull loss of a Boeing 777. There were no fatalities, but there was one serious injury and 46 minor injuries. The accident was caused by icing in the fuel system, resulting in a loss of power.
- On 24 May 2013, British Airways Flight 762, using an Airbus A319-131 and registered as G-EUOE, returned to Heathrow Airport after fan cowl doors detached from both engines shortly after takeoff. During the approach, a fire broke out in the right engine and persisted after the engine was shut down. The aircraft landed safely with no injuries to the 80 people on board. The accident report revealed that the cowlings had been left unlatched following overnight maintenance. The separation of the doors caused airframe damage and the right-hand engine fire was the result of a ruptured fuel pipe.
- On 22 December 2013, British Airways Flight 34, a Boeing 747-436 G-BNLL, hit a building at O. R. Tambo International Airport in Johannesburg after missing a turning on a taxiway. The starboard wing was severely damaged but there were no injuries amongst the crew or 189 passengers; however, four members of ground staff were injured when the wing smashed into the building. The aircraft was officially withdrawn from service in February 2014.
- On 8 September 2015, British Airways Flight 2276, a Boeing 777-236ER G-VIIO, aborted its takeoff at Las Vegas' McCarran International Airport due to an uncontained engine failure of its left (#1) General Electric GE90 engine, which led to a substantial fire. The aircraft was evacuated on the main runway. All 157 passengers and 13 crew escaped the aircraft, at least 14 people sustaining minor injuries.
- Between 21 August 2018 and 5 September 2018, an attacker stole data from almost 500,000 British Airways customers, including credit card details from 250,000. The company was subsequently fined £20 million in October 2020 by the Information Commissioner's Office, the highest ever fine handed by the ICO at the time.

== See also ==
- Aerospace industry in the United Kingdom
- Air transport in the United Kingdom
- Plane Saver Credit Union
- Transport in the United Kingdom
- List of airlines of the United Kingdom
- List of airlines by foundation date

== Bibliography ==
- Road, A. (1978). The facts about an airline. London: Andre Deutsch Ltd.
- Penrose, H. (1980). Wings across the world. London: Cassell Ltd.
- Endres, Gunter (1990). British Airways (2nd ed.). Shepperton (Surrey): Ian Allan Ltd.
- Gaskell, K. (2000). British Airways:Its history, aircraft and liveries. Shrewsbury: Airlife Publ.
- Marriott, L. (2000). British Airways. Shepperton (Surrey): Ian Allan Publishing.
- Jarvis, P. (2014). British Airways-An illustrated history. Amberley Publ.
