= List of airline codes =

This is a list of all airline codes. The table lists the IATA airline designators, the ICAO airline designators and the airline call signs (telephony designator). Historical assignments are also included for completeness.

== Codes ==
Airline codes
IATA	ICAO	Airline	Telephony Designator	Country/Region	Comments
PR	BOI	2GO	ABAIR	Philippines	
	EVY	34 Squadron, Royal Australian Air Force	Multiple		
	GNL	135 Airways	GENERAL	United States	
1A	n/a	Amadeus IT Group S.A.	n/a	Global	GDS and airline hosting system (CRS/PSS)
1B	n/a	Sabre travel network Asia-Pacific (ex-Abacus)	n/a	APAC	Regional distribution
1E	n/a	Travelsky	n/a	China	Local distribution system and hosting system (CRS/PSS)
1F	n/a	Infini travel information, Inc.	n/a	Japan	Local distribution system (CRS)
1G	n/a	Travelport (Galileo core)	n/a	Global	GDS (CRS)
1H	n/a	Sirena travel	n/a	Russia	Local distribution system (CRS) and PSS
1J		PT. Navios Evolusi Solusindo		Indonesia	
1K		MixVel		Russia	
1M		Online Reservation System JSC		Russia	
1P	n/a	Travelport (Worldspan core)	n/a	United States	GDS (CRS)
1S	n/a	Sabre travel network	n/a	United States	GDS and airline hosting system (CRS/PSS)
1T	n/a	Hitit Computer Services	n/a	Turkey	Computer reservation system
1U	n/a	Google/ITA	n/a	United States	Airline IT provider
2T		Bermudair Limited		Bermuda	
	WYT	2 Sqn No 1 Elementary Flying Training School	WYTON	United Kingdom	Royal Air Force
	TFU	213th Flight Unit	THJY	Russia	State Airline
	CHD	223rd Flight Unit	CHKALOVSK-AVIA	Russia	State Airline
	TTF	224th Flight Unit	CARGO UNIT	Russia	State Airline
	TWF	247 Jet Ltd	CLOUD RUNNER	United Kingdom	
	SEC	3D Aviation	SECUREX	United States	
Q5	MLA	40-Mile Air	MILE-AIR	United States	
	QRT	4D Air	QUARTET	Thailand	Defunct
	PIU	43 Air School	PRIMA	South Africa	
4D		Aerro Direkt S.R.L.		Romania	
4R	SEK	Star East Airline	EAST RIDER	Romania	
5W	WAZ	Wizz Air Abu Dhabi	WIZZ SKY	United Arab Emirates	
7B	UBE	Bees Airline	FLOWER BEE	Ukraine	Defunct, AOC revoked due to not having any aircraft.
AQ	JYH	9 Air	TRANS JADE	China	
	BRO	2Excel Aviation	BROADSWORD	United Kingdom	
DM	DWI	Arajet	Arajet	Dominican Republic	
	GBT	A-Jet Aviation Aircraft Management	GLOBETROTTER	Austria	
	AJR	A-Jet Aviation Company	JET MONGOLIA	Mongolia	
	SFM	A-Safar Air Services	AIR SAFAR	Nigeria	
	AJJ	A2 Jet Leasing	ATLANTIC JET	United States	
	XXV	AASANA		Bolivia	
	BBE	Ababeel Aviation	BABEL AIR	Sudan	
1B		Abacus International		Singapore	Computer reservation system
BJ	ABJ	Abaeté Linhas Aéreas	ABAETE	Brazil	defunct
	NKP	Abakan Air	ABAKAN AIR	Russia	2014
RL	ABG	Abakan-Avia	ROYAL FLIGHT	Russia	
	ABE	Aban Air	ABAN	Iran	Former IATA code: K5
	MRP	Abas	ABAS	Czech Republic	
	AHU	ABC Air Hungary	ABC HUNGARY	Hungary	defunct
	FTY	ABC Bedarfsflug	FLY TYROL	Austria	
W9	AAB	Abelag Aviation	ABG	Belgium	defunct
	BDV	Aberdair Aviation	ABERDAV	Kenya	
	ROH	Aberdair Aviation Ghana		Ghana	
	ADJ	Abidjan Air Cargo	ABICAR	Côte d'Ivoire	defunct
	ABP	ABS Jets	BAIR	Czech Republic	Named changed from Aba Air
M3	LTG	ABSA Cargo	Tam Cargo	Brazil	
	TTN	Absolute Flight Services	TITANIUM	South Africa	
GB	ABX	ABX Air	ABEX	United States	August 15, 2003 Air operations of former Airborne Express
	IAE	AC Insat-Aero		Russia	defunct
	NCL	ACA (Ancargo Air)	ANCARGO AIR	Angola	defunct
	ACD	Academy Airlines	ACADEMY	United States	
ZA	CYD	AccessAir	CYCLONE	United States	defunct
		Ace Air	ACE TAXI	South Korea	defunct as of September 2015
	CFM	ACEF	ACEF	Portugal	Transportes Aéreos e Cargas, code no longer allocated
	ARO	Acero Taxi	ACERO	Mexico	
VX	AES	ACES Colombia	ACES	Colombia	defunct
	BVR	ACM Air Charter	BAVARIAN	Germany	
	BJT	ACM Aviation	BAY JET	United States	
	CRV	Acropolis Aviation	ACROPOLIS	United Kingdom	
	ORS	Action Air	AVIATION SERVICE	Italy	ICAO Code no longer allocated, defunct
	AXQ	Action Airlines (Action Air Charter)	ACTION AIR	United States	
	AVR	Active Aero Charter, Inc.	ACTIVE AERO	United States	
	RRM	Acvila Air-Romanian Carrier	AIR ROMANIA	Romania	defunct
	ADC	AD Astra Executive Charter	AD ASTRA	Poland	
	VUE	AD Aviation	FLIGHTVUE	United Kingdom	
	ADE	Ada Air	ADA AIR	Albania	defunct, former IATA code: ZY
KI	DHI	Adam Air	ADAM SKY	Indonesia	defunct
Z7*	ADK	ADC Airlines	ADCO	Nigeria	defunct; former name: Aviation Development Company
	ADW	ADC Airways		Lebanon	defunct
	DSC	Addis Air Cargo Services	ADDIS CARGO	Ethiopia	
	DDS	Addis Airlines	ADDIS LINE	Ethiopia	DEFUNCT
	ADF	Ade, Aviación Deportiva	ADE AVIACION	Spain	
	TEC	ADI Shuttle Group	TECHJET	United States	
	SWH	Adler Aviation	SHOCKWAVE	Canada	
JP	ADR	Adria Airways	ADRIA	Slovenia	defunct as of September 2019
	DRO	Adro Servicios Aereos	ADRO SERVICIOS	Mexico	
	ADV	Advance Air Charters	ADVANCE	Canada	defunct
	AXX	Advance Air Luftfahrtgesellschaft	SKY SHUTTLE	Germany	
	AAX	Advance Aviation	ADVANCE AVIATION	Thailand	
	XTJ	Advance Aviation Services		United States	
4G*		Advance Leasing Company		United States	
AN	WSN	Advanced Air	WINGSPAN	United States	2015
	ADD	Advanced Air Co.		Japan	ICAO Code no longer allocated
	ADV	Advanced Flight Training	ADVANCED	United Kingdom	
	RDD	Adygea Airlines	ADLINES	Russia	defunct
	DVN	Adventia		Spain	
	EBS	AEG Aviation Services		United States	
A3	AEE	Aegean Airlines	AEGEAN	Greece	
	ALS	Aeralp	AERALP	France	
	AEF	Aerea		Spain	
	DRD	Aereo Dorado	AEREO DORADO	Mexico	
	FUT	Aereo Futuro	AEREO FUTURO	Mexico	
	MMG	Aereo Ruta Maya	RUTA MAYA	Guatemala	
	AGI	Aereo Transportes Los Angeles de America	ANGELES AMERICA	Mexico	
	WWG	Aereo WWG	AERO-W	Mexico	
	AED	Aernord	Aernspa	Italy	defunct
	AKR	Aero Clinker	AERO CLINKER	Mexico	
	RRB	Aero Club de Castellon		Spain	
9D	CND	Aero Continente Dominicana	CONDOMINICANA	Dominican Republic	defunct
	ARP	Aero Corporate	IVORYCORP	Côte d'Ivoire	
ML	AEK	Aero Costa Rica	ACORISA	Costa Rica	defunct
	EPU	Aero Elite Acapulco	ELITACAPULCO	Mexico	
	XPN	Aero Express		Niger	
	AJP	Aero Jets Corporativos	AEROJETS	Mexico	
VF	TKJ	AJet	ANATOLIAN	Turkey	formerly AnadoluJet
	OWN	Aero Owen	AERO OWEN	Mexico	2014
	GHM	Aero Service Bolivia		Bolivia	
	GLM	Aero Services Mali	GLOBAL MALI	Mali	
	GUE	Aero Servicio Guerrero	AERO GUERRERO	Mexico	
	ASR	Aero Sotravia	SOTRAVIA	France	2014
	ABA	Aero-Beta	AEROBETA	Germany	
DW	UCR	Aero-Charter Ukraine	CHARTER UKRAINE	Ukraine	
	EAP	Aero-Pyrenees	AERO-PYRENEES	France	
	AJH	Aeroaljarafe	ALJARAFE	Spain	
	AOB	Aerocaribe Coro	CARIBE CORO	Venezuela	
	CRN	Aero Caribbean	AEROCARIBBEAN	Cuba	Merged into Cubana de Aviación in 2015
	ACR	Aerocenter, Escuela de Formación de Pilotos Privados de Avión	AEROCENTER	Spain	
	ERC	Aerocharter		Guatemala	defunct
	BSO	Aeroclub Barcelona-Sabadell		Spain	
	NVA	Aeroclub de Albacete		Spain	
	LUE	Aeroclub de Alicante		Spain	
	MLL	Aeroclub de Mallorca	MALLORCA	Spain	
	AVX	Aeroclub de Vitoria		Spain	
	CTD	Aerocorporativos	AEROCORPORATIVOS	Mexico	
	RRO	Aerocredo		Russia	
	DVI	Aerodavinci	AERO DAVINCI	Mexico	
	FAQ	Aerofaq		Ecuador	
SU	AFL	Aeroflot	AEROFLOT	Russia	
P3	PLS	Aeroflot-Plus	AEROPLUS	Russia	
	AEG	Aerofumigaciones Sam	FUMIGACIONES SAM	Chile	defunct
	AGQ	Aerogala	GALASERVICE	Chile	defunct
	ARH	Aerohelicopteros	AEROHELCA	Venezuela	2014
	BJU	AeroJet	JET EXPRESS	Angola	
	ARJ	Aerojet de Costa Rica, S.A.		Costa Rica	
	LFT	Aerolift Company	LIFTCO	Sierra Leone	defunct
	LIN	Aerolimousine	AEROLIMOUSINE	Russia	
	PCP	Aerolínea Principal Chile	PRINCIPAL	Chile	
	ALT	Aerolíneas Centrales	AERLINEAS CENTRALES	Mexico	
	AHL	Aerolíneas Hidalgo	HIDALGO	Mexico	
	APR	Aerolíneas Primordiales	AEROPERLAS	Mexico	
	LDL	Aerologic		Russia	
	VSC	Aeronautic de Los Pirineos		Spain	
	PSE	Aeroservicio Sipse	SIPSE	Mexico	
	PSL	Aeroservicios Corporativos De San Luis	CORSAN	Mexico	
	EAE	Aeroservicios Ecuatorianos	AECA	Ecuador	
	AES	Aerosur Paraguay	AEROPARAGUAY	Paraguay	
	BTS	Aerotaxis Albatros	AEROLINEAS ALBATROS	Mexico	
	PRI	Aerotransportes Privados	AEROPRIV	Mexico	ICAO code in use by another company, call sign no longer allocated
	PVA	Aerotransportes Privados	TRANSPRIVADO	Mexico	
	VMX	Aeroventas de Mexico	VENTA	Mexico	2014
	ABU	Aerovías Bueno	AEROBUENO	Colombia	defunct
	ACB	African Cargo Services	AFRICARGO	Kenya	
	AAP	Arabasco Air Services	ARABASCO	Saudi Arabia	
	AAR	Americ Air	PATRIOT	United States	defunct
	AAS	Airtransservice	Aviaservice	Russia	defunct
	AAS	Austrian Air Services	AIR SERVICES	Austria	defunct
OB	AAT	Austrian Airtransport	AUSTRIAN CHARTER	Austria	defunct; former IATA code: U8, OG; former ICAO code: AUC
	AAV	Aly Aviation		United Kingdom	defunct; former ICAO code: AAY
	AAW	Austin Airways	AUSTIN	Canada	defunct
SM	AAW	Allied Airways		United Kingdom	defunct, taken over by British European Airways which went on to form British Airways.
	AAW	Almeta Air	ALMETA AIR	Austria	defunct
KJ	AAZ	Asian Air		Kyrgyzstan	
	ABT	Ambeo	AMBITION	United Kingdom	
	ABE	Arberia Airlines	ARBERIA AIRLINES	Albania	defunct
	ACE	Air Charter Express		Ghana	
YE	ACQ	Aryan Cargo Express		India	
	ACS	Aircraft Sales and Services	AIRCRAFT SALES	Pakistan	
	ABS	Air Central	AIR CENTRAL	United States	defunct
	ADT	Arrendaminetos y Transportes Turisticos	ARRENDA-TRANS	Mexico	
	ADZ	Avio Delta		Bulgaria	
	AED	Aie Experience Flight	AIE EXPERIENCE	United Kingdom	defunct
VJ	AFF	Africa Airways	AFRIWAYS	Benin	defunct
	AFM	AEROSPEED FORMATION ET MAINTENANCE	EPIC AIR	France	
	LBR	Air Costa (Lepl Project Limited)		India	defunct
QH	FLA	Air Florida	PALM	United States	relaunching
3O	MAC	Air Arabia Maroc	ARABIA MAROC	Morocco	This ICAO designator was previously used by Malta Air Charter
	MRY	Air Marine	AIR MARINE	France	
	PNK	Air Pink	AIRPINK	Serbia	
	PXG	Aitheras Aviation Group		United States	
	AFN	African International Airlines	SIMBA	Lesotho	
HD	ADO	AIRDO	AIR DO	Japan	
	ACC	Airspeed Charter		Jamaica	2014
	PNX	AIS Airlines	SPINNER	Netherlands	
	AVD	Álamo Aviación, S.L.	ALAMO	Spain	
	FSY	Algonquin Airlink	FROSTY	Canada	2014
	TTX	Alliance Air Charters	TWISTER	United States	
UJ	LMU	AlMasria Universal Airlines	ALMASRIA	Egypt	
	ALN	Alpha Jet, S.R.O.	TOLEMAC	Slovakia	2014
	APN	Alpine Airlines	AIR ALPES	France	
	BAH	The Amiri Flight	BAHRAIN	Bahrain	
A2	AWG	Animawings	ANIMA WINGS	Romania	
	TLB	Atlantique Air Assistance	TRIPLE-A	France	
	UJX	Atlas Ukraine Airlines	ATLAS UKRAINE	Ukraine	2014
	AGM	Aviation West Charters	ANGEL MED	United States	2015
X9	NVD	Avion Express	NORDVIND	Lithuania	Name changed from Nordic Solutions Air
	AZB	Azamat	TUMARA	Kazakhstan	defunct
3S*	AEN	Aeroland Airways	AEROLAND	Greece	defunct, ICAO code no longer allocated
	NGF	Air Charity Network	ANGEL FLIGHT	United States	Re-allocated in 2014 was used by Angel Flight America
	WFT	Aircharters Worldwide	WORLD FLIGHT	United States	Allocated 2014
JU	ASL	Air Serbia	AIR SERBIA	Serbia	Name changed from Aeroput to JAT Yugoslav Airlines to Jat Airways to Air Serbia. Formerly used JAT as ICAO code.
QH	LYN	Air Kyrgyzstan	ALTYN AVIA	Kyrgyzstan	Name changed from Kyrgyzstan
XK	CCM	Air Corsica	CORSICA	France	
	AHS	AHS Air International	HIGH SKY	Pakistan	
	ROO	Aero Roa	AERO ROA	Mexico	
	AWF	Aeroforward		United States	
	SUP	Aeronautical Charters	SUN SPEED	United States	
	PSO	Aerotaxis Pegaso	AEROPEGASO	Mexico	
EI	EIN	Aer Lingus	SHAMROCK	Ireland	
EG	EUK	Aer Lingus UK	GREEN FLIGHT	United Kingdom	
	VLB	Air Volta	VOLTA	Bulgaria	
	FCJ	AirSprint US	FRACJET	United States	Previously used code "HAB"
	TEW	Airteam Charter	TEAMWORK	South Africa	
	STT	Alpha Star Charter	STAR CHARTER	Saudi Arabia	
	LBZ	Angkasa Super Service		Indonesia	
	HEZ	Arrow Aviation	ARROW	Israel	
	UAH	Air Experience Flight, Cranwell		United Kingdom	Royal Air Force
	RVQ	Aero Jet International	REVA AIR	United States	
	ASK	Aerosky	MULTISKY	Spain	
	AEH	Aero4m	AEROCUTTER	Slovenia	
	ERO	Aeroecom	AEROECOM	Venezuela	
A8	XAU	Aerolink Uganda	PEARL	Uganda	
	NKY	Aeromonkey	AEROMON	Mexico	
	AWP	Aeroworld Pakistan		Pakistan	
	AGA	AG Air	GEOLINE	Georgia	
	ABZ	Air Ambulance Services	ISLAND LIFEFLIGHT	Bahamas	
RV	ROU	Air Canada Rouge	ROUGE	Canada	
	CNM	Air China Inner Mongolia	MENGYUAN	China	
	VRE	Air Côte d'Ivoire	COTE DIVORIE	Ivory Coast	
	AWL	Air Walser		Malta	
	AXY	Air X Charter	LEGEND	Malta	
	OES	ART Aviation	ART AUSTRIA	Austria	
	ASF	Austrian Air Force	AUSTRIAN AIRFORCE	Austria	
	AVG	Aviation Legacy	AVILEF	Gambia	
7A	AZY	Aztec Worldwide Airlines	AZTEC WORLD	United States	
6U	ACX	Air Cargo Germany	LOADMASTER	Germany	defunct
	AAD	Aero Aviation Centre Ltd.	SUNRISE	Canada	Ceased operations 1995
	SII	Aero Servicios Ejecutivos Internacionales	ASEISA	Mexico	
	BZS	Aero Biniza	BINIZA	Mexico	
		Aero Comondu	AERO COMONDU	Mexico	
	AET	Aero-Palma	AERO PALMA	Spain	defunct
	ABM	Aero Albatros	ALBATROS ESPANA	Spain	
ZI	AAF	Aigle Azur	AIGLE AZUR	France	Former name: Lucas Aigle Azur; former IATA code: LK
	AAM	Aim Air		Moldova	
	AAO	Atlantis Airlines (USA)	ATLANTIS AIR	United States	
	AAP	Aerovista Airlines	AEROVISTA GROUP	Kyrgyzstan	defunct
AE	AE	Air Ceylon	CEYLON	Sri Lanka	defunct
4K*	AAS	Askari Aviation	AL-ASS	Pakistan	
	AAU	Australia Asia Airlines	AUSTASIA	Australia	Subsidiary merged into Qantas; former IATA code: IM
	AAV	Astro Air International	ASTRO-PHIL	United States	
8U	AAW	Afriqiyah Airways	AFRIQIYAH	Libya	
Q9	AFU	Afrinat International Airlines	AFRINAT	Gambia	defunct, ICAO code no longer allocated
	AAX	Afric'air Express	AFREX	Côte d'Ivoire	defunct
	BRL	Air Brasd'or	BRASD'OR	Canada	
	AFH	Air Fecteau	FECTO	Canada	defunct
	BRM	Air 500	BOOMERANG	Canada	defunct
	AAG	Atlantic Flight Training	ATLANTIC	United Kingdom	Changed from Air Atlantique in 2014
KI	AAG	Air Atlantique	ATLANTIC	United Kingdom	Former name: Atlantic Air Transport; former IATA codes: 7M, DG, transferred to Atlantic Flight Training in 2014.
QB	AAJ	Air Alma	AIR ALMA	Canada	Ceased operations 10/01/2002; former IATA code: 4L
	ACS	Air Cess		Liberia	defunct
	ADT	Air Dorval	AIR DORVAL	Canada	defunct
	AHN	Air Hungaria	AIR HUNGARIA	Hungary	
	AHR	Air Adriatic	ADRIATIC	Croatia	defunct
LD	AHK	Air Hong Kong	AIR HONG KONG	Hong Kong	
	AHS	Air Viggi San Raffaele	AIRSAR	Italy	
	AAI	Air Aurora	BOREALIS	United States	Former IATA code: AX
	ACU	Air Cargo Transportation System	AFRISPIRIT	Kenya	
	ACV	Air Charter Service		United Kingdom	ICAO code no longer allocated
	ADC	Air Atlantic Dominicana	ATLAN-DOMINICAN	Dominican Republic	defunct
2Y	ADW	Air Andaman	AIR ANDAMAN	Thailand	defunct 2004
UX	AEA	Air Europa	EUROPA	Spain	
	AEQ	Air Express	LUNA	Sweden	
IG	AEY	Air Italy	AIR ITALY	Italy	merged into Meridiana
	ASW	Air Southwest Ltd.	AIRSOUTHWEST	Canada	defunct
	ASX	Air Special	AIRSPEC	Czech Republic	
NX	AMU	Air Macau	AIR MACAO	Macao	
6A	AMW	Armenia Airways	ARMENIA	Armenia	
HM	SEY	Air Seychelles	SEYCHELLES	Seychelles	
	SFB	Air Sofia	AIR SOFIA	Bulgaria	defunct
	BRF	Air Bravo	AIR BRAVO	Uganda	
AF	AFR	Air France	AIRFRANS	France	
	ACG	Air Partner	AIR PARTNER	United Kingdom	
SB	ACI	Air Caledonie International	AIRCALIN	France	
	VSG	AirClass Airways	VISIG	Spain	formerly Visig Operaciones Aéreas
EH	AKX	Air Nippon Network Co. Ltd.	ALFA WING	Japan	merged into ANA Wings
	ALM	Air ALM	ANTILLEAN	Netherlands Antilles	defunct
	ALN	Air Lincoln	CHICAGO LINCOLN	United States	
	ACM	Air Caledonia	WEST CAL	Canada	
ED	AXE	AirExplore	GALILEO	Slovakia	
	AGM	Air Guam	AIR GUAM	United States	
ZW	AWI	Air Wisconsin	WISCONSIN	United States	
	ALU	Air Luxor STP	LUXORJET	São Tomé and Príncipe	
YI	RSI	Air Sunshine	AIR SUNSHINE	United States	
GN	AGN	Air Gabon	GOLF NOVEMBER	Gabon	defunct
9T	RUN	Air ACT	CARGO TURK	Turkey	
	AFV	Air Afrique Vacancies	AFRIQUE VACANCE	Côte d'Ivoire	
ZB	ABN	Air Albania	AIR ALBANIA	Albania	
3J	AAQ	Air Alliance	LIAISON	Canada	defunct
WP	ATW	Air Antwerp	DEVIL	Belgium	defunct
BX	ABL	Air Busan	AIR BUSAN	South Korea	
	ACH	Air Cargo Plus	AIR PLUS	Liberia	
	AAT	Air Central Asia		Kyrgyzstan	
LB	LEP	Air Costa	LECOSTA	India	
	AFS	Air Data		United Kingdom	
GL	GRL	Air Greenland	GREENLAND	Greenland	
3S	GUY	Air Guyane Express	GREEN BIRD	French Guiana	
	AHO	Air Hamburg	AIR HAMBURG	Germany	
NQ	AJX	Air Japan	AIR JAPAN	Japan	
IJ	LIB	Air Liberté	LIBERTE	France	defunct
TT	KLA	Air Lithuania	KAUNAS	Lithuania	defunct
QM	AIM	Air Malawi	MALAWI	Malawi	defunct
L6	AMI	Air Maldives	AIR MALDIVES	Maldives	defunct
ML	BIE	Air Mediterranee	MEDITERRANEE	France	defunct
P8	MKG	Air Mekong	MEKONG	Vietnam	defunct
	AMG	Air Minas Linhas Aéreas	AIR MINAS	Brazil	defunct
4O	MNE	Air Montenegro	MOUNT EAGLE	Montenegro	
	TAH	Air Moorea	AIR MOOREA	France	defunct
	ANV	Air Nevada	AIR NEVADA	United States	
NZ	ANZ	Air New Zealand	NEW ZEALAND	New Zealand	"NZ" used by New Zealand National Airways Corporation until its merger with Air New Zealand in 1978 "TE" used by TEAL from 1940-1965, then Air New Zealand from 1965-1990
4N	ANT	Air North Charter - Canada	AIR NORTH	Canada	
	AOE	Air One Executive		Italy	
	AEI	Air Poland	POLISH BIRD	Poland	defunct
YP	APZ	Air Premia	AIR PREMIA	South Korea	
	AVZ	Air Valencia	AIR VALENCIA	Spain	
	AMO	Air Montreal (Air Holdings Inc.)	AIR MONTREAL	Canada	
BM		Air Sicilia		Italy	defunct
	AMR	Air Specialties Corporation	AIR AM	United States	Air American, Total Air
	AMS	Air Muskoka	AIR MUSKOKA	Canada	
	AOJ	Avcon Jet	ASTERIX	Austria	
	AJU	Air Jetsul	AIRJETSUL	Portugal	
	AKA	Air Korea Co. Ltd.		Republic of Korea	
	LIV	Air Livonia	LIVONIA	Estonia	defunct
ZX	ABL	Air BC	AIRCOACH	Canada	Merged into Air Canada Jazz
	ABN	Air Fret Senegal		Senegal	
	LJA	Air Jamahiriya Company	AIR JAMAHIRIYA	Libya	ICAO code no longer allocated
G8	AGB	Air Service Gabon		Gabon	defunct
7T	AGV	Air Glaciers	AIR GLACIERS	Switzerland	
	MVM	Air Cargo America	PEGASUS	United States	
	AMY	Air Ambar	AIR AMBAR	Dominican Republic	
6V	VGA	Air Vegas	AIR VEGAS	United States	defunct
	AOU	Air Tractor	AIR TRACTOR	Croatia	
	APA	Air Park Aviation Ltd.	CAN-AM	Canada	
	APG	Air People International	AIR PEOPLE	Thailand	
NH	ANA	All Nippon Airways	ALL NIPPON	Japan	
	ANB	Air Navigation And Trading Co. Ltd.	AIR NAV	United Kingdom	Former ICAO code: AAT
	NGO	Air-Angol	AIR ANGOL	Angola	
TZ	TWG	air-taxi Europe	TWINGOOSE	Germany	
	NGP	Air Nigeria	REGAL EAGLE	Nigeria	defunct
2Q	SNC	Air Cargo Carriers	NIGHT CARGO	United States	
	SND	Air Samarkand	ARSAM	Uzbekistan	
V7	SNG	Air Senegal International	AIR SENEGAL	Senegal	defunct
	SNY	Air Sandy	AIR SANDY	Canada	
	AII	Air Integra	INTEGRA	Canada	
	BFF	Air Baffin	AIR BAFFIN	Canada	renamed to Air Nunavut
	BDM	Air Bandama	BANDAMA	Ivory Coast	
AB	BER	Air Berlin	AIR BERLIN	Germany	defunct
	ABT	Air Brousse	AIR BROUSSE	Canada	defunct
	APV	Air Plan International	AIR PLAN	Democratic Republic of the Congo	
	ARX	Air Xpress, Inc.	AIREX	United States	
	HTT	Air Tchad	HOTEL TANGO	Chad	
	ARZ	Air Resorts	AIR RESORTS	United States	
	ASB	Air-Spray 1967 Ltd.	AIR SPRAY	Canada	
	ASC	Air Star Corporation	AIR STAR	Canada	
4D	ASD	Air Sinai	AIR SINAI	Egypt	
	AQN	Air Queensland	BUSHAIR	Australia	defunct
	ARC	Air Routing International Corp.		United States	
QN	ARR	Air Armenia	AIR ARMENIA	Armenia	
	AIL	Air Illinois	AIR ILLINOIS	United States	defunct
AI	AIC	Air India Limited	AIRINDIA	India	
	AIG	Air Inter Gabon		Gabon	
PJ	SPM	Air Saint Pierre	SAINT-PIERRE	France	
SZ	WOW	Air Southwest	SWALLOW	United Kingdom	defunct
	ATJ	Air Traffic GmbH	SNOOPY	Germany	
8C	ATN	Air Transport International	AIR TRANSPORT	United States	
	ATQ	Air Transport Schiphol	MULTI	Netherlands	
	ATS	Air Transport Service		Democratic Republic of the Congo	
	AVG	Air Falcon	DJIBOUTI FALCON	Djibouti	
	AUX	Air Uganda International Ltd.		Uganda	
NF	AVN	Air Vanuatu	AIR VAN	Vanuatu	
ZB	BUB	Air Bourbon	BOURBON	Reunion	defunct
CC	ABD	Air Atlanta Icelandic	ATLANTA	Iceland	
3H	AIE	Air Inuit	AIR INUIT	Canada	
	AIS	Air Sureste	SURESTE	Spain	
RB	SBK	Air Srpska	Air Srpska	Bosnia and Herzegovina	defunct
TN	THT	Air Tahiti Nui	TAHITI AIRLINES	France	
SW	NMB	Air Namibia	NAMIBIA	Namibia	defunct
	NSK	Air Intersalonika	INTERSALONIKA	Greece	
	NTL	Air Anatolia	AIR ANATOLIA	Turkey	defunct
	SGA	Air Saigon	AIR SAIGON	Vietnam	
	AFW	Afrique Regional Airways	AFRAIR	Côte d'Ivoire	defunct
AW	AFW	Africa World Airlines	BLACKSTAR	Ghana	
	ACX	Air Charters	PARAIR	Canada	defunct
PE	AEL	Air Europe Italy	AIR EUROPE	Italy	defunct
JM	AJM	Air Jamaica	JAMAICA	Jamaica	merged into Caribbean Airlines; ICAO and IATA codes no longer used.
	AWN	Air Niamey	AIR NIAMEY	Niger	
	AWT	Air West	AIR WEST	Canada	
6G	AWW	Air Wales	RED DRAGON	United Kingdom	defunct, ICAO code no longer allocated
TX	FWI	Air Caraïbes	FRENCH WEST	France	
IX	AXB	Air India Express	EXPRESS INDIA	India	
	AXD	Air Express	AIR SUDEX	Sudan	
	BSB	Air Wings	ARBAS	Moldova	
BT	BTI	Air Baltic	AIRBALTIC	Latvia	
	ANI	Air Atlantic (Nig) Limited	NIGALANTIC	Nigeria	
EL	ANK	Air Nippon	ANK AIR	Japan	merged into All Nippon Airways, ICAO code no longer allocated
YW	ANE	Air Nostrum	AIR NOSTRUM	Spain	
PX	ANG	Air Niugini	NIUGINI	Papua New Guinea	
G9	ABY	Air Arabia	ARABIA	United Arab Emirates	
AC	ACA	Air Canada	AIR CANADA	Canada	
AP	LAV	AlbaStar	ALBASTAR	Spain	
E9	MHS	Air Memphis	AIR MEMPHIS	Egypt	defunct
XT	AXL	Air Exel	EXEL COMMUTER	Netherlands	defunct
	AZF	Air Zermatt AG	AIR ZERMATT	Switzerland	
UM	AZW	Air Zimbabwe	AIR ZIMBABWE	Zimbabwe	
	MHU	Air Memphis	MEPHIS UGANDA	Uganda	
	MKH	Air Marrakech Service	AIR MARRAKECH	Morocco	
	AZX	Air Max Africa	AZIMA	Gabon	defunct
S2	RSH	Air Sahara	SAHARA	India	renamed to Jetlite
	ATA	Air Transport Association		United States	
TC	ATC	Air Tanzania	TANZANIA	Tanzania	
	XAC	Air Charter World		United States	
2J	VBW	Air Burkina	BURKINA	Burkina Faso	
	ATH	Air Travel Corp.	AIR TRAVEL	United States	
KM	AMC	Air Malta	AIR MALTA	Malta	
YT	TGA	Air Togo	AIR TOGO	Togo	defunct
	ASJ	Air Satellite	SATELLITE	Canada	defunct
	ASN	Air and Sea Transport		Russia	
	ASS	Air Class, S.A. de C.V.	AIR CLASS	Mexico	
	NPL	Air Nepal International	AIR NEPAL	Nepal	defunct
	NPR	Air Napier		New Zealand	defunct
	WAM	Air Taxi & Cargo	TAXI CARGO	Sudan	
	RSM	Air Somalia	AIR SOMALIA	Somali Republic	
	AWZ	AirWest		Sudan	
G4	AAY	Allegiant Air	ALLEGIANT	United States	
	AAZ	Angus Aviation	ANGUS	Canada	defunct
	ABA	Artem-Avia	ARTEM-AVIA	Ukraine	defunct
	ABB	African Business and Transportations	AFRICAN BUSINESS	Democratic Republic of the Congo	
	ABF	Aerial Oy	SKYWINGS	Finland	
	ABK	Alberta Citylink	ALBERTA CITYLINK	Canada	defunct, ICAO code no longer allocated
	ABO	APSA Colombia	AEROEXPRESO	Colombia	aka Aeroexpreso Bogota
O4	ABV	Antrak Air	ANTRAK	Ghana	
GB	ABX	Airborne Express	ABEX	United States	August 14, 2003 merged into DHL
	ABZ	ATA Brasil	ATA-BRAZIL	Brazil	defunct
	ACC	Avcard Services		United Kingdom	ICAO code no longer allocated
	ACY	Atlas Cargo Airlines	ATLAS CARGOLINES	Morocco	
	ADA	Airservices Australia	AUSCAL	Australia	Flight Inspection Unit
8T	TID	Air Tindi	TINDI	Canada	
	ADB	Antonov Airlines	ANTONOV BUREAU	Ukraine	Antonov Design Bureau
	ADG	Aerea Flying Training Organization	AEREA TRAINING	Spain	
	ADI	Audeli Air	AUDELI	Spain	
	ADL	Aero Dynamics	COTSWOLD	United Kingdom	
	ADN	Aero-Dienst	AERODIENST	Germany	
	ADP	Aerodiplomatic	AERODIPLOMATIC	Mexico	
3L	ADY	Air Arabia Abu Dhabi	Nawras	United Arab Emirates	
	ADQ	Avion Taxi	AIR DATA	Canada	2695731 Canada Inc.
	ADS	Aviones de Sonora	SONORAV	Mexico	
	ADU	Airdeal Oy	AIRDEAL	Finland	
EM*	AEB	Aero Benin	AEROBEN	Benin	defunct
	AEC	Aerocésar	AEROCESAR	Colombia	defunct; aka Aerovías del César
	AED	Aerotrans Airlines		Russia	defunct
	ADX	Anderson Aviation	ANDAX	United States	
	AEI	Aeroexpreso Interamericano	INTERAM	Colombia	defunct
	AEJ	Air Express	KHAKI EXPRESS	Tanzania	
	AEK	Aerocon	AEROCON	Bolivia	
	AEM	Aero Madrid	AEROMADRID	Spain	
KD	AEN	Air Enterprise	AIR ENTERPRISE	France	defunct
	AEO	Aeroservicios Ejecutivos Del Occidente	AERO OCCIDENTE	Mexico	
	AEP	Aerotec Escuela de Pilotos	AEROTEC	Spain	
AX	AAC	AmericanConnection	CONNECT AMERICA	United States	defunct
AN	AAA	Ansett Australia	ANSETT	Australia	defunct
	AAC	Army Air Corps	ARMYAIR	United Kingdom	
5W	AEU	Astraeus	FLYSTAR	United Kingdom	defunct, ICAO code no longer allocated
	AEV	Aeroventas	AEROVENTAS	Mexico	
VV	AEW	Aerosvit Airlines	AEROSVIT	Ukraine	defunct
	AEX	Airway Express	AVCO	United States	ICAO code no longer allocated
	AEZ	Aerial Transit	AERIAL TRANZ	United States	
	AFA	Alfa Air	BLUE ALFA	Czech Republic	
WK	AFB	American Falcon	AMERICAN FALCON	Argentina	defunct
QQ	UTY	Alliance Airlines	UNITY	Australia	
	UVS	Air Universal	UNI-LEONE	Sierra Leone	defunct
	UVT	Auvia Air	AUVIA	Indonesia	
	AFC	African West Air	AFRICAN WEST	Senegal	
	AFE	Airfast Indonesia	AIRFAST	Indonesia	
FG	AFG	Ariana Afghan Airlines	ARIANA	Afghanistan	
RV*	AFI	Africaone	AFRICAWORLD	The Gambia	
Y2	AFJ	Alliance Air	JAMBO	Uganda	Ceased operations 08/10/2000
	AFK	Africa Air Links	AFRICA LINKS	Sierra Leone	
	AFO	Aero Empresa Mexicana	AERO EMPRESA	Mexico	
	AFQ	Alba Servizi Aerotrasporti	ALBA	Italy	
5Z	AFX	Airfreight Express		United Kingdom	Ceased operations 08/03/2002
	AFY	Africa Chartered Services	AFRICA CHARTERED	Nigeria	
	AFZ	Africa Freight Services	AFREIGHT	Zambia	
	AGA	Aeronaves Del Centro		Venezuela	
	AGC	Arab Agricultural Aviation Company	AGRICO	Egypt	
	AGF	Atlantic Gulf Airlines	ATLANTIC GULF	United States	defunct
5D	SLI	Aeroméxico Connect	COSTERA	Mexico	
	AGG	Algoma Airways	ALGOMA	Canada	ICAO code no longer allocated
	AGH	Altagna	ALTAGNA	France	
	AGO	Angola Air Charter	ANGOLA CHARTER	Angola	
	AGP	AERFI Group	AIR TARA	Ireland	
1A	AGT	Amadeus IT Group	AMADEUS	Spain	
	AGU	Angara Airlines	SARMA	Russia	
	AGW	Aero Gambia	AERO GAMBIA	Gambia	defunct, ICAO code no longer allocated
JJ	AGX	Aviogenex	GENEX	Serbia	defunct
	BLR	Atlantic Coast Airlines	BLUE RIDGE	United States	defunct
	BLZ	Aero Barloz	AEROLOZ	Mexico	
PL	PLI	Aeroperú	Aeroperu	Peru	defunct
8A	BMM	Atlas Blue	ATLAS BLUE	Morocco	defunct
	BNB	Aero Banobras	AEROBANOBRAS	Mexico	
	AGY	Aero Flight Service	FLIGHT GROUP	United States	
	AGZ	Agrolet-Mci	AGROLET	Slovakia	
GD	AHA	Air Alpha Greenland	AIR ALPHA	Denmark	sold to Air Greenland
	AHC	Azal Avia Cargo	AZALAVIACARGO	Azerbaijan	Cargo Airline of the State Concern Azerbaijan Hava
	AHE	Airport Helicopter Basel, Muller & Co.	AIRPORT HELICOPTER	Switzerland	
	CJE	Aeroservices Corporate	BIRD JET	France	
	AHF	Aspen Helicopters	ASPEN	United States	
	AHG	Aerochago Airlines	AEROCHAGO	Dominican Republic	defunct
	AHH	Airplanes Holdings	AIRHOLD	Ireland	
	AHP	Aerochiapas	AEROCHIAPAS	Mexico	
HT	AHW	Aeromist-Kharkiv	AEROMIST	Ukraine	defunct
J2	AHY	Azerbaijan Airlines	AZAL	Azerbaijan	
U3	AIA	Avies	AVIES	Estonia	
4Y	AIB	Airbus Industrie	AIRBUS INDUSTRIE	France	
KJ	AIH	Air Incheon	AIR INCHEON	South Korea	
RS	ASV	Air Seoul	AIR SEOUL	South Korea	
	AIK	African Airlines International Limited	AFRICAN AIRLINES	Kenya	
	AIN	African International Airways	FLY CARGO	Swaziland	
5A	AIP	Alpine Air Express	ALPINE AIR	United States	
	AIU	Alicante Internacional Airlines	ALIA	Spain	
PA	ABQ	Airblue	AIRBLUE	Pakistan	
	THM	Airmark Aviation	THAI AIRMARK	Thailand	
	AIR	Airlift International	AIRLIFT	United States	defunct
	AIT	Airest	AIREST CARGO	Estonia	
	AIV	Airvias S/A Linhas Aéreas	AIRVIAS	Brazil	
W4	BES	Aero Services Executive	BIRD EXPRESS	France	
	AIW	Atlantic Island Airways	TARTAN	Canada	
	AIX	Aircruising Australia	CRUISER	Australia	
	AIY	Aircrew Check and Training Australia	AIRCREW	Australia	
IZ	AIZ	Arkia Israel Airlines	ARKIA	Israel	
	AJA	Afghan Jet International Airlines	AFGHAN JET	Afghanistan	
	AJB	Aero JBR	AERO JBR	Mexico	
	AJE	Aero Jet Express	JET EXPRESS	Mexico	defunct
	AJI	Ameristar Jet Charter	AMERISTAR	United States	
	AJK	Allied Air	BAMBI	Nigeria	
	AJO	Aero Ejecutivo	AEROEXO	Mexico	defunct
	AJS	Aeroejecutivos Colombia	AEROEJECUTIVOS	Colombia	Aeroejecutivos Aeroservicios Ejecutivos
M6	AJT	Amerijet International	AMERIJET	United States	
	AJV	ANA & JP Express	AYJAY CARGO	Japan	merged into Air Japan
	AJW	Alpha Jet International	ALPHAJET	United States	
	AJY	AJet	AYJET	Cyprus	defunct, ICAO code no longer allocated
	AKB	Aktjubavia	KARAB	Kazakhstan	
	AKC	Arca Aerovías Colombianas Ltda.	ARCA	Colombia	
	AKF	Anikay Air Company	ANIKAY	Kyrgyzstan	
	AKH	Akhal	AKHAL	Turkmenistan	
	MNI	Aeromilenio	AEROMIL	Mexico	
	AKK	Aklak Air	AKLAK	Canada	
4A	AKL	Air Kiribati	KIRIBATI	Kiribati	
	AKN	Alkan Air	ALKAN AIR	Canada	
	AKW	Angkor Airways	ANGKORWAYS	Cambodia	defunct
	AKZ	AK Navigator LLC	ABSOLUTE	Kazakhstan	ICAO code no longer allocated
	ALB	Aero Albatros	ALBATROS	Mexico	
	ALD	Albion Aviation	ALBION	United Kingdom	
	ALE	Aeroalas Colombia	AEROALAS	Colombia	defunct
	ALF	Allied Command Europe (Mobile Force)	ACEFORCE	Belgium	
	FYS	American Flyers	AMERICAN FLYERS	United States	
	DFA	Aero Coach Aviation	AERO COACH	United States	
EV	ASQ	Atlantic Southeast Airlines	ACEY	United States	Merged into ExpressJet Airlines
	ALG	Air Logistics	AIRLOG	United States	
	ALL	Aerovallarta	VALLARTA	Mexico	
HP	AWE	America West Airlines	CACTUS	United States	Merged with US Airways
6R	TNO	Aerotransporte de Carga Union	AEROUNION	Mexico	
	TND	Aero Taxis Cessna	TAXIS CESSNA	Mexico	
	TMP	Arizona Express Airlines	TEMPE	United States	
	ALO	Allegheny Commuter Airlines	ALLEGHENY	United States	US Airways Express
	ALP	Allpoints Jet	ALLPOINTS	China	
	ALP	Alpliner AG	ALPINER	Switzerland	Code now allocated to another user
	ALQ	Altair Aviation (1986)	ALTAIR	Canada	
VH	ALV	Aeropostal Alas de Venezuela	AEROPOSTAL	Venezuela	
	ALW	Alas Nacionales, S.A.	ALNACIONAL	Dominican Republic	
	ALY	Alyeska Air Service	ALYESKA	United States	
	ALZ	Alta Flights (Charters) Ltd.		Canada	
	AMA	ATMA	ADIK	Kazakhstan	
	AMD	Aerolíneas Medellín	AEROLINEAS MEDELLIN	Colombia	defunct
	AMF	Ameriflight	AMFLIGHT	United States	
	AMH	Alan Mann Helicopters Ltd.	MANN	United Kingdom	ICAO code no longer allocated
	AMJ	Aviation Amos	AVIATION AMOS	Canada	
	AMK	Amerer Air	AMER AIR	Austria	
	AMM	Aeroputul International Marculesti	AEROM	Moldova	
DP	AMM	Air 2000	JETSET	United Kingdom	defunct
	AMP	Aero Transporte S.A. (ATSA)	ATSA	Peru	
	AMQ	Aeromedicare Ltd.	LIFELINE	United Kingdom	No longer current
	AMQ	Aircraft Management and Consulting	AMEX	Poland	
TZ	AMT	ATA Airlines	AMTRAN	United States	defunct
YJ	AMV	AMC Airlines	AMC AIRLINES	Egypt	Aircraft Maintenance Company
AM	AMX	Aeroméxico	AEROMEXICO	Mexico	
	AMZ	Amiya Airline	AMIYA AIR	Nigeria	
	ANC	Anglo Cargo	ANGLO	United Kingdom	Defunct, ICAO code no longer allocated
	BRP	AeroBratsk	AEROBRA	Russia	
	ANH	Alajnihah for Air Transport	ALAJNIHAH	Libya	
	ANM	Aerotransportacion de Norteamerica	NORAM	Mexico	
	ANM	Antares Airtransport, Maintenance & Service GmbH	ANTARES	Germany	ICAO Code now allocated to another user
TL	ANO	Airnorth	TOPEND	Australia	
	ANQ	Aerolínea de Antioquia	ANTIOQUIA	Colombia	
OY	ANS	Andes Líneas Aéreas	AEROANDES	Argentina	
IW	AOM	AOM French Airlines	French Lines	France	defunct
	ANW	Aviación Del Noroeste, S.A. de C.V.	AVINOR	Mexico	defunct
	SAP	Avia Jaynar	TOBOL	Kazakhstan	
	EMS	Aero Servicios Empresariales	SERVIEMPRESARIAL	Mexico	
	AOA	Alcon Servicios Aéreos, S.A. de C.V.	ALCON	Mexico	
J6	AOC	AVCOM	AERO AVCOM	Russia	
	AOD	Aero Vodochody	AERO CZECH	Czech Republic	
	AOF	Atair Pty Ltd.	ATAIR	South Africa	
2D	AOG	Aero VIP	AVIP	Argentina	defunct
	MUN	Aeromundo Ejecutivo	AEROMUNDO	Mexico	
	MUR	Aerolínea Muri	MURI	Mexico	
	AOI	Astoria, Inc.	ASTORIA	Canada	defunct
	NRO	Aero Rent JSC	AEROMASTER	Russia	defunct
	NRP	Aeronord-Grup	AERONORD	Moldova	
	AOK	Aeroatlantico Colombia		Colombia	defunct
	AOL	Angkor Airlines	ANGKOR AIR	Cambodia	defunct
	AON	Aero Entreprise	AERO ENTERPRISE	France	
	AOO	As, Opened Joint Stock Company	COMPANY AS	Ukraine	
	AOP	Aeropiloto	AEROPILOTO	Portugal	
VB	VIV	Aeroenlaces Nacionales	AEROENLACES	Mexico	Former ICAO code: AEN
	VIZ	Aerovis Airlines	AEROVIZ	Ukraine	
	VJE	AvJet Routing		United Arab Emirates	
	VGF	Aerovista Gulf Express	VISTA GULF	United Arab Emirates	
	VER	Almaver	ALMAVER	Mexico	
	AOR	Afro International Ent. Limited	INTER-AFRO	Nigeria	
	SMX	Alitalia Express	ALIEXPRESS	Italy	
OE	AOT	Asia Overnight Express	ASIA OVERNIGHT	Philippines	
	AOV	Aero Vision	AEROVISION	France	
	AOX	Aerotaxi Del Valle	AEROVALLE	Colombia	
	APC	Airpac Airlines, Inc.	AIRPAC	United States	
	SVM	Aeroservicios Monterrey	SERVIMONTE	Mexico	
	APF	Amapola Flyg AB	AMAPOLA	Sweden	
	APH	Alpha Aviation, Inc.	AIRFLIGHT	United States	
	API	ASA Pesada, Lda.	ASA PESADA	Angola	
	APJ	Peach Aviation	AIR PEACH	Japan	
	PET	Aerotransporte Petrolero	AEROPETRO	Colombia	
GV	ARF	Aero Flight	Aero Fox	Germany	defunct
	BKL	Aircompany Barcol	BARCOL	Russia	
	BLA	All Charter Limited	ALL CHARTER	United Kingdom	ICAO code no longer allocated
	APL	Appalachian Flying Service, Inc.	APPALACHIAN	United States	
	APM	Airpac, Inc.	ALASKA PACIFIC	United States	
	APO	Aeropro	AEROPRO	Canada	defunct
	APP	AlpAvia d.o.o.	ALPAVIA	Slovenia	
	APQ	Aspen Aviation	ASPEN BASE	United States	
	APU	Aeropuma, S.A.	AEROPUMA	El Salvador	
JW	APW	Arrow Air	BIG A	United States	defunct
	APX	Apex Air Cargo	PARCEL EXPRESS	United States	
	APY	APA Internacional	APA INTERNACIONAL	Dominican Republic	
	AQA	Aeroatlas, S.A.	ATCO	Colombia	
	AQL	Aquila Air Ltd.	AQUILA	Canada	
	AQO	Aluminum Company Of America	ALCOA SHUTTLE	United States	Alcoa Aircraft Operations
	AQT	Avioquintana	AVIOQUINTANA	Mexico	
	AQU	AirQuarius Aviation	QUARIUS	South Africa	defunct
	AQZ	Aerodyne Charter Company	QUANZA	United States	
	ARA	Arik Air	ARIK AIR	Nigeria	
	ARB	Avia Air N.V.	AVIAIR	Aruba	
2B	AWT	Albawings	ALBAWINGS	Albania	
4C	ARE	Aires, Aerovías de Integración Regional, S.A.	AIRES	Colombia	renamed to LAN Colombia
AR	ARG	Aerolíneas Argentinas	ARGENTINA	Argentina	
	ARH	Arrowhead Airways	ARROWHEAD	United States	
	ARI	Aero Vics	AEROVICS	Mexico	
	SUN	Antillana De Navegación Aérea		Dominican Republic	
	SUO	Aeroservicios De San Luis	SERVICIO SANLUIS	Mexico	
	SUP	Aerosuper	AEROSUPER	Mexico	
	ARK	Aero Link Air Services S.L.	LINK SERVICE	Spain	
	ARL	Airlec - Air Aquitaine Transport	AIRLEC	France	
	ARM	Aeromarket Express	AMEX	Spain	defunct
	ARO	Arrow Aviation Ltd.	ARROW	Canada	defunct
	KLD	Air Klaipėda	AIR KLAIPEDA	Lithuania	
	ARQ	Armstrong Air, Inc.	ARMSTRONG	Canada	
	ARS	Aeromet Servicios	METSERVICE	Chile	
	ART	Aerotal Aerolíneas Territoriales de Colombia Ltda.	AEROTAL	Colombia	defunct
	ARV	Aravco Ltd.	ARAVCO	United Kingdom	
	ARW	Aria	ARIABIRD	France	
	OST	Airline Alania	ALANIA	Russia	
	HUC	Aerolíneas de Techuacán	LINEAS TEHUACAN	Mexico	
	HUT	Aerotransportes Huitzilin	AEROHUITZILIN	Mexico	
	HUY	Aero Transportes Del Humaya	AERO HUMAYA	Mexico	
	ARY	Argosy Airways	GOSEY	United States	
AS	ASA	Alaska Airlines, Inc.	ALASKA	United States	
PL	ASE	Airstars	MOROZOV	Russia	defunct
	ASF	Air Schefferville, Inc.	SCHEFF	Canada	
	ASG	African Star Airways (PTY) Ltd.	AFRICAN STAR	South Africa	
	ASI	Aerosun International, Inc.	AEROSUN	United States	
	ASM	Awesome Flight Services (PTY) Ltd.	AWESOME	South Africa	
	ASO	Aero Slovakia	AERO NITRA	Slovakia	
	ASP	Airsprint	AIRSPRINT	Canada	
	ASR	All Star Airlines, Inc.	ALL STAR	United States	
	AST	Aerolíneas Del Oeste	AEROESTE	Mexico	
	WAP	Arrow Panama	ARROW PANAMA	Panama	
	ASV	Astravia-Bissau Air Transports Ltd.	ASTRAVIA	Guinea-Bissau	
OB	ASZ	Astrakhan Airlines	AIR ASTRAKHAN	Russia	defunct
	ATB	Atlantair Ltd.	STARLITE	Canada	
	ATD	Aerotours Dominicana	AEROTOURS	Dominican Republic	
	ATE	Atlantis Transportation Services, Ltd.	ATLANTIS CANADA	Canada	
	ATG	Aerotranscargo	MOLDCARGO	Moldova	
HC	ATI	Aero-Tropics Air Services	AEROTROPICS	Australia	defunct
	ATK	AeroTACA	AEROTACA	Colombia	defunct, Aerotaxi Casanare
	ATL	Atlas Air Service AG	AIR BREMEN	Germany	
FO	ATM	Par Avion	AIRTAS	Australia	
	CPV	Air Corporate	AIRCORPORATE	Italy	
	ATP	ASTRAL Colombia - Aerotransportes Especiales Ltda.	ASTRAL	Colombia	
	FEO	Aeroferinco	FERINCO	Mexico	
	FES	Aero Taxis Y Servicios Alfe	AERO ALFE	Mexico	
	FFA	Avialesookhrana	AVIALESOOKHRANA	Russia	
	FFB	Africair Service	FOXTROT FOXTROT	Senegal	
	ATR	Atlas Airlines	ATLAS-AIR	United States	
	ATT	Aer Turas	AERTURAS	Ireland	defunct
	ATU	Atlant Aerobatics Ltd.	ATLANT HUNGARY	Hungary	
	ATV	Avanti Air	AVANTI AIR	Germany	
	ATW	Aero Trades (Western) Ltd.	AERO TRADES	Canada	defunct, ICAO code no longer allocated
OS	AUA	Austrian Airlines	AUSTRIAN	Austria	
IQ	AUB	Augsburg Airways	AUGSBURG-AIR	Germany	defunct
	TUP	Aviastar-Tu	TUPOLEVAIR	Russia	
RU	ABW	AirBridge Cargo	AIRBRIDGE CARGO	Russia	Former IATA: BO
	TUR	ATUR		Ecuador	
	TXU	ATESA Aerotaxis Ecuatorianos	ATESA	Ecuador	
	TXX	Austin Express	COWBOY	United States	defunct
	AUD	Audi Air, Inc.	AUDI AIR	United States	
	AUF	Augusta Air Luftfahrtunternehmen	AUGUSTA	Germany	
	AUM	Air Atlantic Uruguay	ATLAMUR	Uruguay	
	AUN	Aviones Unidos	AVIONES UNIDOS	Mexico	
	AUP	Avia Business Group		Russia	
	SVE	Aero Servicios Expecializados	AEROESPECIAL	Mexico	
GR	AUR	Aurigny Air Services	AYLINE	United Kingdom	
NO	AUS	Aus-Air	AUS-AIR	Australia	defunct
AU	AUT	Austral Líneas Aéreas	AUSTRAL	Argentina	
	AUU	Aurora Aviation, Inc.	AURORA AIR	United States	ICAO code no longer allocated
	AUY	Aerolíneas Uruguayas, S.A.	AUSA	Uruguay	
	AVF	Aviair Aviation Ltd.	CARIBOO	Canada	
	AVH	AV8 Helicopters	KENT HELI	United Kingdom	
	AVJ	Avia Traffic Company	ATOMIC	Kyrgyzstan	
	AVK	AV8 Helicopters	AVIATE-COPTER	South Africa	
	AVM	Aviación Ejecutiva Mexicana, S.A.	AVEMEX	Mexico	
	AVO	Aviation at Work	AVIATION WORK	South Africa	
	AVP	Avcorp Registrations	AVCORP	United Kingdom	No longer used
	AVP	Aviacion Corporativa de Peubla	AVIA PUEBLA	Mexico	
	LFP	Alfa Aerospace	ALFA-SPACE	Australia	
	LFR	Atlantic Airfreight Aviation	LANFREIGHT	São Tomé and Príncipe	
	AVS	Avialsa T-35	AVIALSA	Spain	
	AVT	Asia Avia Airlines	ASIAVIA	Indonesia	defunct
	AVU	Avia Sud Aérotaxi	AVIASUD	France	
	AVV	Airvantage Incorporated	AIRVANTAGE	United States	
	AVW	Aviator Airways	AVIATOR	Greece	
	AVX	Aviapaslauga	PASLAUGA	Lithuania	defunct
	YRG	Air Yugoslavia	YUGAIR	Serbia	defunct; operations continue under Jat Airways
K8	ZAK	Airlink Zambia		Zambia	Zambia Skyways Limited
	ZZM	Agence Nationale des Aerodromes et de la Meteorologie (ANAM)		Ivory Coast	
4Y	BGA	Airbus Transport International	BELUGA	France	
B9	BGD	Air Bangladesh	AIR BANGLA	Bangladesh	defunct
	BGF	Aviodetachment-28	BULGARIAN	Bulgaria	
	BGG	Aero BG	AERO BG	Mexico	
	BHC	Aerotaxis De La Bahia	BAHIA	Mexico	
	BIV	Aviaservice	AVIASERVICE	Georgia	
	SZA	Aerolíneas de El Salvador	AESA	El Salvador	defunct
	AVY	Aerovaradero, S.A.	AEROVARADERO	Cuba	
	AWB	Airways International, Inc.	AIRNAT	United States	
	AWK	Airwork	AIRWORK	New Zealand	
	AWL	Australian Wetleasing	AUSSIEWORLD	Australia	
	AWO	Awood Air Ltd.	AWOOD AIR	Canada	
	AWR	Arctic Wings And Rotors Ltd.	ARCTIC WINGS	Canada	
	ISM	Auo Airclub AIST-M	STORK	Russia	
	AWS	Arab Wings	ARAB WINGS	Jordan	
	AWV	Airwave Transport, Inc.	AIRWAVE	Canada	
	AWY	Aeroway, S.L.	AEROWEE	Spain	
	AXH	Aeromexhaga	AEROMEXHAGA	Mexico	
	AXI	Aeron International Airlines, Inc.	AIR FREIGHTER	United States	
	AXK	African Express Airways	EXPRESS JET	Kenya	Former IATA code: QA; former ICAO code: AEK; former callsign: AFRICAN EXPRESS
AK	AXM	AirAsia	RED CAP	Malaysia	ICAO code no longer allocated
D7	XAX	AirAsia X	XANADU	Malaysia	
DJ	WAJ	AirAsia Japan	WING ASIA	Japan	defunct
I5	IAD	AirAsia India	ARIYA	India	Founded 28. Mar 2013
MY	MWG	AirBorneo	MASWINGS	Malaysia	transitioned from MASwings on 1 January 2026
	AXN	Alexandair	ALEXANDROS	Greece	defunct
	AXP	Aeromax	AEROMAX SPAIN	Spain	
	BNI	Alberni Airways	ALBERNI	Canada	
	BNZ	Aerolíneas Bonanza	AERO BONANZA	Mexico	
	BOC	Aerobona	AEROBONA	Mexico	
	AXR	Axel Rent, S.A.	RENTAXEL	Mexico	
	AXS	Altus Airlines	ALTUS	United States	
	AXV	AVA Airlines	AVA	Iran	
	AXX	Avioimpex A.D.p.o.	IMPEX	Macedonia	defunct
6V	AXY	Axis Airways	AXIS	France	defunct
	AYD	Aladia Airlines	AIRLINES ALADIA	Mexico	defunct
	AYK	Aykavia Aircompany		Armenia	ICAO code no longer allocated
	AYM	Airman, S.L.	AIRMAN	Spain	
	NPT	West Atlantic UK	NEPTUNE	United Kingdom	
	GBN	Atlantic Airlines	ATLANTIC GABON	Gabon	
EX	BJK	Atlantic Airlines	BLACKJACK	United States	
	HHA	Atlantic Airlines de Honduras	ATLANTIC HONDURAS	Honduras	defunct
	AYN	Atlantic Airlines, S.A.	ATLANTIC NICARAGUA	Nicaragua	
	AYS	Awsaj Aviation Services		Libya	ICAO code no longer allocated
	AYT	Ayeet Aviation & Tourism	AYEET	Israel	
3G	AYZ	Atlant-Soyuz Airlines	ATLANT-SOYUZ	Russia	defunct
AZ	AZA	Alitalia	ALITALIA	Italy	defunct
ZE	AZE	Arcus-Air Logistic	ARCUS AIR	Germany	
A2	AZI	Astra Airlines	ASTRA	Greece	
	AZK	Azalhelikopter	AZALHELICOPTER	Azerbaijan	
	AZL	Africa One	SKY AFRICA	Zambia	defunct
	AZM	Aerocozumel	AEROCOZUMEL	Mexico	
	AZP	Arizona Pacific Airways	ARIZONA PACIFIC	United States	
	AZS	Aviacon Zitotrans Air Company	ZITOTRANS	Russia	
	AZT	Azimut, S.A.	AZIMUT	Spain	
	AZV	Azov Avia Airlines	AZOV AVIA	Ukraine	defunct, Asov-Avia, Aircompany
	MHC	Aero Jomacha	AERO JOMACHA	Mexico	
	AZY	Arizona Airways, Inc.	ARIZAIR	United States	
	AZZ	Azza Transport	AZZA TRANSPORT	Sudan	
	NAR	Air Continental Inc	NIGHT AIR	United States	
	NAU	Antanik-Air	ANTANIK	Ukraine	
	NER	Air Newark	NEWAIR	United States	
	NFF	Aircraft Support and Services		Lebanon	ICAO code no longer allocated
	OBA	Aerobanana	AEROBANANA	Mexico	
	OBK	Amako Airlines	AMAKO AIR	Nigeria	
R7	OCA	Aserca Airlines	AROSCA	Venezuela	
	NFS	Afrique Cargo Service Senegal		Senegal	defunct
	NGC	Angoservice	ANGOSERVICE	Angola	
	NGE	Angel Airlines	ANGEL AIR	Thailand	defunct, ICAO code no longer allocated
	NGF	Angel Flight America	ANGEL FLIGHT	United States	Renamed Air Charity Network in 2014
	OUL	Air Atonabee	CITY EXPRESS	Canada	defunct
	OVA	Aero Nova	AERONOVA	Spain	
	XPE	Amira Air	EXPERT	Austria	
	XSS	Aero Express Intercontinental	INTER EXPRESS	Mexico	
	TLR	Air Libya Tibesti	AIR LIBYA	Libya	
	OVC	Aerovic		Ecuador	
	RVE	Airventure	AIRVENTURE	Belgium	
	RVI	Aero Servicios	AERO SERVICIOS	Mexico	
	RVL	Airvallee	AIR VALLEE	Italy	
	OVE	Aeromover	AEROMOVER	Mexico	
	OVI	Aerovías Ejecutivas	VIAS EJECUTIVAS	Mexico	
	PTD	Aero Servicio Pity	PITY	Mexico	
	PTE	Aero Copter	AERO-COP	Mexico	
	PLL	Air Pal	AIRPAL	Spain	Escuela De Pilots
	PLM	Air Pullmantur	PULLMANTUR	Spain	
RX	AEH	Aviaexpress	AVEX	Hungary	defunct
	PSG	Aviones Para Servirle	SERVIAVIONES	Mexico	
	SLU	Avio Sluzba	AVIO SLUZBA	Serbia	
	SCU	Air Scorpio	SCORPIO UNIVERS	Bulgaria	
	SIP	Air Spirit	AIR SPIRIT	United States	
	BMV	Alatau Airlines	OLIGA	Kazakhstan	
	GUG	Aviateca	AVIATECA	Guatemala	
	PXX	Aroostook Aviation	PINE STATE	United States	
	PYC	Aeropycsa	AEROPYCSA	Mexico	
	PVK	Association of Private Pilots of Kazakhstan	BORIS	Kazakhstan	ICAO code no longer allocated
	BAS	Aero Services	AEROSERV	Barbados	
	BBT	Air Bashkortostan	AGYDAL	Russia	defunct
	MCY	Ambulance Air Africa	MERCY	South Africa	
MQ	EGF	American Eagle Airlines	EAGLE FLIGHT	United States	Renamed Envoy Air, ICAO Code and Callsign withdrawn in 2014
	PUE	Aeropuelche	PUELCHE	Chile	
	PUT	Aeroput		Serbia	defunct
ZS	AZI	Azzurra Air	AZZURRA	Italy	defunct
FF		Airshop		Netherlands	
ML	ETC	African Transport Trading and Investment Company	TRANATTICO	Sudan	
	XCT	Aero Costa Taxi Aéreo	AEROCOSTAXI	Mexico	
	VRO	Aerovitro	AEROVITRO	Mexico	
	VRI	Aerotaxi Villa Rica	VILLARICA	Mexico	
	VEG	Aerovega	AEROVEGA	Mexico	
	VVG	Aerovilla	AEROVILLA	Colombia	
	VLR	Aerolíneas Villaverde	VILLAVERDE	Mexico	
WI	WIL	Aero Air	WILLIAMETTE	United States	
	VEJ	Aero Ejecutivos	VENEJECUTIV	Venezuela	
	WAB	Aero Industries Inc	WABASH	United States	
	VNG	Aero Servicios Vanguardia	VANGUARDIA	Mexico	
	VAD	Aero Taxi Los Valles	VALLES	Spain	
	VMR	Aero Vilamoura	AERO VILAMOURA	Portugal	ICAO code no longer allocated
	VLS	Aero Virel	VIREL	Mexico	
	XAA	Aeronautical Radio Inc	ROCKFISH	United States	
	VUO	Aerovuelox	AEROVUELOX	Mexico	
	VTM	Aeronaves TSM	AERONAVES TSM	Mexico	
VU	VUN	Air Ivoire	AIRIVOIRE	Ivory Coast	defunct
BP	BOT	Air Botswana	BOTSWANA	Botswana	
	XPR	Air-Rep		United States	
	XLL	Air Excel	TINGA-TINGA	Tanzania	
	VAE	Air Evans	AIR-EVANS	Spain	Ecuela de Pilotos Privados
	WHY	Air Sorel	AIR SOREL	Canada	
	WDR	Air Net Private Charter	WIND RIDER	United States	
	XEC	Air Executive Charter		Germany	
GS	UPA	Air Foyle	FOYLE	United Kingdom	defunct, ICAO code no longer allocated
	VTY	Air Midwest (Nigeria)	VICTORY	Nigeria	
VT	VTA	Air Tahiti	AIR TAHITI	French Polynesia	
3N	URG	Air Urga	URGA	Ukraine	
	VDR	Air Vardar	VARDAR	Macedonia	ICAO code in use by another company, call sign no longer allocated
VL	VIM	Air VIA	CRYSTAL	Bulgaria	
	WLR	Air Walser	AIRWALSER	Italy	
	URA	Aircompany Rosavia	ROSAVIA	Ukraine	
	XLB	Aircraft Performance Group		United States	
	WLA	Airwaves Airlink	AIRLIMITED	Zambia	
	XFX	Airways Corporation of New Zealand	AIRCORP	New Zealand	
	WAY	Airways	GARONNE	France	
	WGS	Airwings oy	AIRWINGS	Finland	
	XAK	Airkenya	SUNEXPRESS	Kenya	
	WPK	Air-Lift Associates	WOLFPACK	United States	
	VAB	Airtrans Ltd		Russia	
	URP	ARP 410 Airlines	AIR-ARP	Ukraine	
	WPR	Auckland Regional Rescue Helicopter Trust	WESTPAC RESCUE	New Zealand	
	URR	Aurora Airlines	AIR AURORA	Slovenia	defunct, ICAO code no longer allocated
	UST	Austro Aéreo	AUSTRO AEREO	Ecuador	
	WLT	Aviation Partners	WINGLET	United States	
	VLV	Avialift Vladivostok	VLADLIFT	Russia	
	VME	Aviación Comercial de América	AVIAMERICA	Mexico	
	VVA	Aviast Air	IALSI	Russia	defunct
	WLV	Aviation North	WOLVERINE	United States	
FK	WTA	Africa West	WEST TOGO	Togo	
	VNT	Avient Air Zambia	AVIENT	Zambia	
	VZR	Aviazur	IAZUR	France	
	VID	Aviaprad	AVIAPRAD	Russia	defunct
G2	VXG	Avirex	AVIREX-GABON	Gabon	
	VXX	Aviaexpress Aircompany	EXPRESSAVIA	Ukraine	
	XAM	AMR Services Corporation	ALLIANCE	United States	
	XAO	Airline Operations Services		United States	
	VAZ	Airlines 400	REMONT AIR	Russia	
V8	VAS	ATRAN Cargo Airlines	ATRAN	Russian Federation	
	VAM	Ameravia	AMERAVIA	Uruguay	
K6	KHV	Angkor Air	AIR ANGKOR	Cambodia	
	VBC	AVB-2004 Ltd	AIR VICTOR	Bulgaria	
	XKX	ASECNA		France	
	XAT	AT and T Aviation Division		United States	
	CAJ	Air Caraibes Atlantique	CAR LINE	France	
	CAO	Air China Cargo	AIRCHINA FREIGHT	China	
	CBE	Aerovías Caribe	AEROCARIBE	Mexico	
	CBO	Aerotaxi del Cabo	TAXI CABO	Mexico	
	CBS	Air Columbus	AIR COLUMBUS	Ukraine	
	CBV	Aereo Cabo	CABOAEREO	Mexico	
CA	CCA	Air China	AIR CHINA	China	
	CDA	Aerocardal	CARDAL	Chile	
Q6	CDP	Aero Condor Peru	CONDOR-PERU	Peru	
	CDU	Aerotrans		Russia	
	CDV	Airline Skol	SKOL	Russia	
	CFF	Aerofan	AEROFAN	Spain	
	CFR	Africa One		Democratic Republic of the Congo	defunct
	CFV	Aero Calafia	CALAFIA	Mexico	
	CGB	Air Cargo Belize	CARGO BELIZE	Belize	
	CGV	Aero Clube Do Algarve	CLUBE ALGARVE	Portugal	
	CGW	Air Great Wall	CHANGCHENG	China	defunct
	CHJ	Aircompany Chaika	AIR CHAIKA	Ukraine	
	CHR	Air Charter Services	ZAIRE CHARTER	Democratic Republic of the Congo	
	CHV	Air Charter Professionals	CHARTAIR	United States	
	CID	Asia Continental Airlines	ACID	Kazakhstan	defunct, ICAO code no longer allocated
5F	CIR	Arctic Circle Air Service	AIR ARCTIC	United States	defunct 2011
	CKL	Aviation Charter Services	CIRCLE CITY	United States	
	CLL	Aerovías Castillo	AEROCASTILLO	Mexico	
	CLP	Aero Club De Portugal	CLUB PORTUGAL	Portugal	
	CMF	Air Care Alliance	COMPASSION	United States	
	CNE	Air Toronto	CONNECTOR	Canada	
	CNH	Aquila Air	CHENANGO	United States	
	CNU	Air Consul	AIR CONSUL	Spain	
	CNX	AllCanada Express	CANEX	Canada	defunct
	CPF	Airtechservice	TECHSERVICE	Ukraine	defunct
QC	CRD	Air Corridor	AIR CORRIDOR	Mozambique	defunct
NV	CRF	Air Central	AIR CENTRAL	Japan	Ceased operations 2010
	CRJ	Air Cruzal	AIR CRUZAL	Angola	
	CRP	Aerotransportes Corporativos	AEROTRANSCORP	Mexico	
YN	CRQ	Air Creebec	CREE	Canada	
	CTA	Aero Charter and Transport	CHAR-TRAN	United States	
	CTE	Air Tenglong	TENGLONG	China	
	CTR	Aerolíneas Centauro	CENTAURO	Mexico	
	CUO	Aerocuahonte	CUAHONTE	Mexico	
CV	CVA	Air Chathams	CHATHAM	New Zealand	
CW	CWM	Air Marshall Islands	AIR MARSHALLS	Marshall Islands	
	CWP	Australian Customs Service	COASTWATCH	Australia	
	CYL	Air One Cityliner	CITYLINER	Italy	
	CYO	Air Transport	COYOTE	United States	
	CYE	Aerocheyenne	AEROCHEYENNE	Mexico	
AH	DAH	Air Algérie	AIR ALGERIE	Algeria	
	DAP	Aerovías DAP	DAP	Chile	
	DBA	Air Alpha	DOUBLE-A	United States	
	DBD	Air Niagara Express	AIR NIAGARA	Canada	
	DEF	Aviation Defense Service	TIRPA	France	
	DEG	Air Service Groningen	DEGGER	Netherlands	ICAO code and call sign no longer allocated
ER	DHL	Astar Air Cargo	D-H-L	United States	defunct, DHL
	DHM	Archer Aviation	ARCHER	United Kingdom	ICAO code no longer allocated
	DIC	Aeromedica	AEROMEDICA	Mexico	
	DIN	Aerodin	AERODIN	Mexico	
	DJU	Air Djibouti	AIR DJIB	Djibouti	defunct
EN	DLA	Air Dolomiti	DOLOMITI	Italy	
	DLS	Aero Modelo	AEROMODELO	Mexico	
	DLU	Aerolíneas del Sur	DEL SUR	Chile	defunct
	DMC	Aerodinamica de Monterrey	DINAMICAMONT	Mexico	
	DMI	Aeroservicios Dinamicos	AERODINAMICO	Mexico	
	DML	Aerotaxis Dosmil		Mexico	
	DNA	Aerodespachos de El Salvador	AERODESPACHOS	El Salvador	
	DNC	Aerodynamics Málaga	FLYINGOLIVE	Spain	
	DNJ	Aerodynamics Incorporated	DYNAJET	United States	
NM	DRD	Air Madrid	ALADA AIR	Spain	defunct
	DRM	Airways Flight Training	DARTMOOR	United Kingdom	
	DRO	Aeronaves Del Noreste	AERONORESTE	Mexico	
6R	DRU	Alrosa Air Company	MIRNY	Russia	
	DSK	Aero Algarve	SKYBANNER	Portugal	ICAO code no longer allocated
	DST	Aex Air	DESERT	United States	
	EAT	Air – Transport Europe	TRANS EUROPE	Slovakia	
EE	EAY	Aero Airlines	REVAL	Estonia	defunct
	EBC	Aero Ejecutivo De Baja California	CALIXJET	Mexico	
4F	ECE	Air City	AIRCITY	Germany	
	ECG	Aero Ejecutivos RCG	EJECTUIVOS RCG	Mexico	
	ECL	Aeronáutica Castellana	AERO CASTELLANA	Spain	
	ECM	Aerolíneas Comerciales	AERO COMERCIALES	Mexico	
	EDA	Aerolineas Nacionales Del Ecuador	ANDES	Ecuador	defunct
	EET	Air Este	AESTE	Spain	
	EFC	Air Mana	FLIGHT TAXI	France	
	EJP	Aeroservicios Ejecutivos Corporativos	EJECCORPORATIVOS	Mexico	
E8	ELG	Alpi Eagles	ALPI EAGLES	Italy	defunct, ICAO code no longer allocated
	ALX	ALPI Jets	ALPIJETS	Austria	
	END	Arrendadora y Transportadora Aérea	ARRENDADORA	Mexico	
	ENW	Aeronaves Del Noroeste	AERONOR	Spain	
	EOL	Airailes	EOLE	France	
RF	EOK	Aero K	AEROHANKUK	South Korea	established in May 2016; commenced operations on 15 April 2021
	EOM	Aero Ermes	AERO ERMES	Mexico	
	EPL	Aero Transportes Empresariales	EMPRESARIALES	Mexico	
	EPE	Aero Empresarial	AEROEMPRESARIAL	Mexico	
KY	EQL	Air São Tomé and Príncipe	EQUATORIAL	São Tomé and Príncipe	defunct
	ERG	Avianergo	AVIANERGO	Russia	defunct
	ERI	Aero Servicios Regiomontanos	ASERGIO	Mexico	
	ERK	Aerosec	AEROSEC	Chile	
	ERM	Aeromaan	EOMAAN	Mexico	
	ESB	Aereosaba	AEREOSABA	Mexico	
	ESO	Avitat		United Kingdom	
	ESU	Aerolíneas Ejecutivas Del Sureste	ALESUR	Mexico	
	ESZ	Aeronáutica La Esperanza	ESPERANZA	Mexico	
	ETE	Aero Siete	AEROSIETE	Mexico	
	EUK	Air Atlanta Europe	SNOWBIRD	United Kingdom	defunct
	EVE	Air Evex	SUNBEAM	Germany	
	EVR	Aeronautical Academy of Europe	DIANA	Portugal	
E2/E6	EWE/EWL	Eurowings Europe	EUROPWINGS BLACK PEARL	Austria	
	EXG	Air Exchange	EXCHANGE	United States	
	FAC	Atlantic Helicopters	FAROECOPTER	Denmark	
	FAG	Argentine Air Force	FUAER	Argentina	
PC	FAJ	Air Fiji	FIJIAIR	Fiji	defunct
	FAN	AF-Air International	FANBIRD	Angola	
	FBW	Aviation Data Systems		United States	
	FCI	Air Carriers	FAST CHECK	United States	
	FCO	Aerofrisco	AEROFRISCO	Mexico	
	FCU	Alfa 4		Mexico	
JH	FDA	Fuji Dream Airlines	FUJI DREAM	Japan	
	FDS	African Medical and Research Foundation	FLYDOC	Kenya	
	FGT	Aero Freight	FREIAERO	Mexico	
	FIC	Aerosafin	AEROSAFIN	Mexico	
OF	FIF	Air Finland	AIR FINLAND	Finland	
	FII	Aerodata Flight Inspection	FLIGHT CHECKER	Germany	ICAO code no longer allocated
	FIX	Airfix Aviation	AIRFIX	Finland	
FJ	FJI	Fiji Airways	PACIFIC	Fiji	
	FLD	Air Falcon		Pakistan	
RC	FLI	Atlantic Airways	FAROELINE	Faroe Islands	
	FLP	Aeroclub Flaps	AEROCLUB FLAPS	Spain	defunct
QH	FLZ	Aero Leasing	AIR FLORIDA	United States	dba Air Florida
	FMT	Air Fret De Mauritanie		Mauritania	
	FNM	Avio Nord		Italy	
	FNO	Aeroflota Del Noroeste	RIAZOR	Spain	
	FNX	Aero Fenix	AERO FENIX	France	ICAO code no longer allocated
	FPY	African Company Airlines	AFRICOMPANY	Democratic Republic of the Congo	Defunct. ICAO code in use by another company.
	FRJ	Afrijet Airlines	AFRIJET	Nigeria	
	FRK	Afrika Aviation Handlers	AFRIFAST	Kenya	
	FRQ	Afrique Chart'air	CHARTER AFRIQUE	Cameroon	
	FRT	Aerofreight Airlines		Russia	
	FST	Aeros Limited	FAST TRACK	United Kingdom	ICAO code no longer allocated
	FTC	Air Affaires Tchad	AFFAIRES TCHAD	Chad	
NY	FXI	Air Iceland	FAXI	Iceland	
	GAU	Aerogaucho	AEROGAUCHO	Uruguay	
	GBJ	Aero Business Charter	GLOBAL JET	Germany	
	GCF	Aeronor	AEROCARTO	Spain	
	GCK	Aerogem Cargo	AEROGEM	Ghana	defunct
	GFO	Aerovías del Golfo	AEROVIAS GOLFO	Mexico	
	GGL	Aeronáutica	GIRA GLOBO	Angola	
ZX	GGN	Air Georgian	GEORGIAN	Canada	
	GHL	Aviance UK	HANDLING	United Kingdom	Gatwick Handling
	GHN	Air Ghana	AIR GHANA	Ghana	
	GIL	African International Transport	AFRICAN TRANSPORT	Guinea	
2U	GIP	Air Guinee Express	FUTURE EXPRESS	Guinea	
	GIZ	Africa Airlines	AFRILENS	Guinea	
	GLL	Air Gemini	TWINS	Angola	
	GLT	Aero Charter	GASLIGHT	United States	
	GME	Aguilas Mayas Internacional	MAYAN EAGLES	Guatemala	
	GMM	Aerotaxis Guamuchil	AEROGUAMUCHIL	Mexico	
	GMS	Aeroservicios Gama	SERVICIOS GAMA	Mexico	
0A	GNT	Amber Air	GINTA	Lithuania	
	GOA	Alberta Government	ALBERTA	Canada	
	GRE	Air Scotland	GREECE AIRWAYS	Greece	
DA	GRG	Air Georgia	AIR GEORGIA	Georgia	
	GRI	Air Cargo Center		São Tomé and Príncipe	
LL	GRO	Allegro	ALLEGRO	Mexico	defunct (IATA code reallocated)
	GRR	Agroar - Trabalhos Aéreos	AGROAR	Portugal	
	GRX	Aircompany Grodno	GRODNO	Belarus	
	GSP	Airlift Alaska	GREEN SPEED	United States	
	GSV	Agrocentr-Avia	AGRAV	Kazakhstan	
	GTC	Altin Havayolu Tasimaciligi Turizm Ve Ticaret	GOLDEN WINGS	Turkey	
5Y	GTI	Atlas Air	GIANT	United States	
	GTP	Aerotaxi Grupo Tampico	GRUPOTAMPICO	Mexico	
	GUA	Aerotaxis de Aguascalientes	AGUASCALIENTES	Mexico	
GG	GUY	Air Guyane	GREEN BIRD	French Guiana	
	GVI	Air Victoria Georgia	IRINA	Georgia	
H9	HAD	Air d'Ayiti	HAITI AVIA	Haiti	
GG	HAH	Air Comores International	AIR COMORES	Comoros	
	HAT	Air Taxi	TAXI BIRD	France	
	HEI	Aerohein	AEROHEIN	Chile	
	HGH	Atlantic Air Lift	HIGHER	France	
	HID	Aviación Ejecutiva De Hildago	EJECUTIVA HIDALGO	Mexico	
	HJA	Air Haiti	AIRHAITI	Haiti	
HD	HLN	Air Holland	ORANGE	Netherlands	defunct
	HJT	Al Rais Cargo	AL-RAIS CARGO	United Arab Emirates	
	HKH	Air-Invest	HAWKHUNGARY	Hungary	
	HMA	Air Tahoma	TAHOMA	United States	ICAO code no longer allocated
	HMT	Air Nova	HAMILTON	United Kingdom	ICAO code no longer allocated
	HOM	Aero Homex	AERO HOMEX	Mexico	
	HPO	Almiron Aviation	ALMIRON	Uganda	
	HQO	Avinor		Norway	
	HYR	Airlink Airways	HIGHFLYER	Ireland	
8C	HZT	Air Horizon	HORIZON TOGO	Togo	
	ICM	Air Inter Cameroun	INTER-CAMEROUN	Cameroon	
	IFI	Air Lift	HELLAS LIFT	Greece	
	IKM	Aero Survey	EASY SHUTTLE	Ghana	Callsign changed from GHANA SURVEY
	ILK	Aero Airline	ILEK	Kazakhstan	
	IME	Airtime Charters	AIRTIME	United Kingdom	ICAO code no longer allocated
	IMN	Aerotaxis Cimarron	TAXI CIMARRON	Mexico	
	INA	Aero Internacional	AERO-NACIONAL	Mexico	
	ING	Aeroingenieria	AEROINGE	Chile	defunct
	INO	Aeroservicios Intergrados de Norte	INTENOR	Mexico	
	IPL	Airpull Aviation	IPULL	Spain	
	IRD	Arvand Airlines	ARVAND	Iran	
	IRH	Atlas Aviation Group	ATLAS AVIA	Iran	
	IRW	Aram Airline	ARAM	Iran	
	IRX	Aria Tour	ARIA	Iran	
	ITE	Aerotaxi S.R.O.	AEROTAXI	Czech Republic	
	ITF	Avita-Servicos Aéreos	AIR AVITA	Angola	
	ITI	AirSwift	AIRSWIFT	Philippines	
	ITO	Aero Citro	AERO CITRO	Mexico	
	IVE	Air Executive	COMPANY EXEC	Spain	
	IWS	Aviainvest		Russia	
W9	JAB	Air Bagan	AIR BAGAN	Myanmar	
	JAD	Aerojal	AEROJAL	Mexico	
	JAR	Airlink	AIRLINK	Austria	
	JEE	Ambjek Air Services	AMBJEK AIR	Nigeria	
	JKH	JETKONTOR AG	JETKONTOR	Germany	
	UTX	Avfinity		United States	
	JMR	Alexandair	ALEXANDAIR	Canada	
	JMX	Air Jamaica Express	JAMAICA EXPRESS	Jamaica	
	JOA	Air Swift Aviation		Australia	
	JOB	Aerojobeni	JOBENI	Mexico	
IP	JOL	Atyrau Air Ways	EDIL	Kazakhstan	
	JPR	Aerosmith Aviation	JASPER	United States	ICAO code no longer allocated
	JTS	Arrendamiento de Aviones Jets	AVIONESJETS	Mexico	
	JUA	Aero Juarez	JUAREZ	Mexico	
QK	JZA	Air Canada Jazz	JAZZ	Canada	
	KAA	Asia Aero Survey and Consulting Engineers	AASCO	Republic of Korea	ICAO code no longer allocated
	KAD	Air Kirovograd	AIR KIROVOGRAD	Ukraine	
	KAM	Air Mach	ICO-AIR	Italy	
	KAV	Air Kufra	AIRKUFRA	Libya	
	KEK	Arkhabay	ARKHABAY	Kazakhstan	ICAO code no longer allocated
	KFK	Aero Charter Krifka	KRIFKA AIR	Austria	
	KFT	Air Kraft Mir	AIR KRAFT MIR	Uzbekistan	
	KGD	Air Concorde	CONCORDE AIR	Bulgaria	
	KHH	Alexandria Airlines		Egypt	
	KIE	Afit	TWEETY	Germany	
	KKB	Air South	KHAKI BLUE	United States	
KK	KKK	Atlasjet	ATLASJET	Turkey	
	KLB	Air Mali International	TRANS MALI	Mali	
	KLZ	Aerokaluz	AEROKALUZ	Mexico	
JS	KOR	Air Koryo	AIR KORYO	North Korea	
	KOY	Araiavia	ALEKS	Kazakhstan	
	KRE	AeroSucre	AEROSUCRE	Colombia	
	KRT	Air Kokshetau	KOKTA	Kazakhstan	ICAO code no longer allocated
	KSI	Air Kissari	KISSARI	Angola	
	KTN	Aeronavigaciya	AERONAVIGACIYA	Ukraine	
	KVR	Alliance Avia	KAVAIR	Kazakhstan	
	KYC	Av Atlantic	DOLPHIN	United States	
KC	KZR	Air Astana	ASTANALINE	Kazakhstan	
	LAG	Aviation Legacy	AVILEG	Gambia	
		Aerovías De Lagos	AEROLAGOS	Mexico	Was LAG
LV	LBC	Albanian Airlines	ALBANIAN	Albania	
	LBI	Albisa	ALBISA	Mexico	
	LBW	Albatros Airways	ALBANWAYS	Albania	
	LDG	Aerolíneas Aéreas Ejecutivas De Durango	DURANGO	Mexico	
3S	BOX	Aerologic	GERMAN CARGO	Germany	
	LDN	Al-Donas Airlines	ALDONAS AIR	Nigeria	
QP	AKJ	Akasa Air	AKASA AIR	India	
	LDR	Aero Lider	AEROLIDER	Mexico	
	LEM	Aleem		Egypt	
	LET	Aerolíneas Ejecutivas	MEXEJECUTIV	Mexico	
H7	LFA	Air Alfa	AIR ALFA	Turkey	
	LFC	Aero Control Air	LIFE FLIGHT CANADA	Canada	defunct
	LGN	Aerolaguna	AEROLAGUNA	Mexico	
	LHR	Al Ahram Aviation	AL AHRAM	Egypt	
D4	LID	Alidaunia	ALIDA	Italy	
	LIE	Al-Dawood Air	AL-DAWOOD AIR	Nigeria	
	LKP	American Aviation	LAKE POWELL	United States	ICAO code no longer allocated
	LKS	Airlink Solutions	AIRLIN	Spain	
	LKY	Air Solutions	LUCKY	United States	
9I	LLR	Air India Regional	ALLIED	India	
	LMA	Aerolima	AEROLIMA	Mexico	
	LML	Alamia Air	ALAMIA AIR	Libya	ICAO code no longer allocated
	LMP	Air Plus Argentina	AIR FLIGHT	Argentina	
	LMT	Almaty Aviation	ALMATY	Kazakhstan	
	LMX	Aerolíneas Mexicanas J S	LINEAS MEXICANAS	Mexico	
	LMY	Air Almaty	AGLEB	Kazakhstan	
	LMZ	Air Almaty ZK	ALUNK	Kazakhstan	
4Z	LNK	Airlink	LINK	South Africa	
	LNT	Aerolíneas Internacionales	LINEAINT	Mexico	
	LOK	Alok Air	ALOK AIR	Sudan	
	LOU	Air Saint Louis	AIR SAINTLOUIS	Senegal	
FL	LPA	Air Leap	LEAP	Sweden	
	LPC	Alpine Aviation	NETSTAR	South Africa	
A6	LPV	Air Alps Aviation	ALPAV	Austria	
	LRO	Alrosa-Avia	ALROSA	Russia	
	LRW	Al Rida Airways	AL RIDA	Mauritania	
	LSK	Aurela	AURELA	Lithuania	
	LSM	Aerobusinessservice		Russia	defunct
	LSR	Alsair	ALSAIR	France	
	LTI	Aerotaxis Latinoamericanos	LATINO	Mexico	
	LUC	Albinati Aeronautics	ALBINATI	Switzerland	
TD	LUR	Atlantis European Airways	ATLANTIS	Armenia	defunct
	LVN	Aliven	ALIVEN	Italy	
	LVR	Aviavilsa	AVIAVILSA	Lithuania	
L8	LXG	Air Luxor GB	LUXOR GOLF	Guinea-Bissau	
LK	LXR	Air Luxor	AIRLUXOR	Portugal	ICAO code no longer allocated
	LYT	Apatas Air	APATAS	Lithuania	
	LZP	Air Ban	DOC AIR	Bulgaria	
	LZR	Air Lazur	LAZUR BEE-GEE	Bulgaria	
	MAM	Aeródromo De La Mancha	AEROMAN	Spain	
MK	MAU	Air Mauritius	AIRMAURITIUS	Mauritius	
	MBA	Avag Air	AVAG AIR	Austria	
	MBB	Air Manas	AIR MANAS	Kyrgyzstan	
	MBC	Airjet Exploração Aérea de Carga	MABECO	Angola	
	MBV	Aeriantur-M	AEREM	Moldova	defunct
	MCB	Air Mercia	WESTMID	United Kingdom	
	MCD	Air Medical	AIR MED	United Kingdom	
	MCO	Aerolíneas Marcos	MARCOS	Mexico	
	MDC	Atlantic Aero and Mid-Atlantic Freight	NIGHT SHIP	United States	
MD	MDG	Air Madagascar	AIR MADAGASCAR	Madagascar	
	MDX	Aerosud Charter	MEDAIR	South Africa	
	MEF	Air Meridan	EMPENNAGE	Nigeria	
	MFL	Aero McFly	MCFLY	Mexico	
	MGE	Asia Pacific Airlines	MAGELLAN	United States	
	MGS	Aeromagar	AEROMAGAR	Mexico	
	MIE	Aero Premier De Mexico	AEROPREMIER	Mexico	
9U	MLD	Air Moldova	AIR MOLDOVA	Moldova	
	MLF	Amal Airlines	AMAL	Djibouti	
L9	MLI	Air Mali	AIR MALI	Mali	defunct
	MLN	Air Madeleine	AIR MADELEINE	Canada	
	MMC	Aermarche	AERMARCHE	Italy	
	MMD	Air Alsie	MERMAID	Denmark	
	MMM	Aviation Company Meridian	AVIAMERIDIAN	Russia	
	MMP	AMP Incorporated	AMP-INC	United States	
	MMX	Airmax	PERUMAX	Peru	
	MNE	Aerolíneas Amanecer	AEROAMANECER	Mexico	
	MNG	Aero Mongolia	AERO MONGOLIA	Mongolia	
	MOC	Air Monarch Cargo	MONARCH CARGO	Mexico	
	MOP	Aeropublicitaria De Angola	PUBLICITARIA	Angola	
	MOR	Aerolíneas De Morelia	AEROMORELIA	Mexico	
A7	MPD	Air Plus Comet	RED COMET	Spain	
QO	MPX	Aeromexpress	AEROMEXPRESS	Mexico	
	MQT	Air ITM	MUSKETEER	France	
	MRL	Aeromorelos	AEROMORELOS	Mexico	
	MRM	Aerocharter	MARITIME	Canada	
MR	MRT	Air Mauritanie	MIKE ROMEO	Mauritania	
SM	MSC	Air Cairo	AIR CAIRO	Egypt	
	MSK	Air Sport	AIR SPORT	Bulgaria	
	MSM	Aeromas	AEROMAS EXPRESS	Uruguay	
	MSO	Aerolíneas Mesoamericanas	MESO AMERICANAS	Mexico	
	MSV	Aero-Kamov	AERAFKAM	Russia	
	MTB	Aerotaxis Metropolitanos	AEROMETROPOLIS	Mexico	
	MTE	Aeromet Línea Aérea	AEROMET	Chile	defunct
	MTK	Air Metack	AIRMETACK	Angola	
	MTY	Air Montegomery	MONTY	United Kingdom	ICAO code no longer allocated
	MXO	Aerotaxi Mexicano	MAXAERO	Mexico	
	MYS	Aero Yaqui Mayo	AERO YAQUI	Mexico	
	MZK	AVC Airlines		Japan	
	MZL	Aerovías Montes Azules	MONTES AZULES	Mexico	
2V*		Amtrak		United States	Train services only
F4	NBK	Albarka Air	AL-AIR	Nigeria	
	NEL	Aero Servicios de Nuevo Laredo	AEROLAREDO	Mexico	
	NGV	Angoavia	ANGOAVIA	Angola	
	NID	Aeroni	AERONI	Mexico	
	NIE	Aeroejecutiva Nieto	AERONIETO	Mexico	
AJ	NIG	Aero Contractors	AEROLINE	Nigeria	
	NKZ	Aerokuzbass	NOVOKUZNETSK	Russia	
	NRE	Aviones Are	AVIONES ARE	Mexico	
	NRS	Atlantic Richfield Company	NORTH SLOPE	United States	
	NSO	Aerolíneas Sosa	SOSA	Honduras	
	NTD	Aero Norte		Mexico	
	NTV	Air Inter Ivoire	INTER-IVOIRE	Ivory Coast	
	NUL	Aeroservicios De Nuevo Leon	SERVICIOS NUEVOLEON	Mexico	
	NVI	Avial NV Aviation Company	NEW AVIAL	Russia	
	NWG	Airwing	NORWING	Norway	
	NXA	Air Next	BLUE-DOLPHIN	Japan	
	OAO	Arkhangelsk 2 Aviation Division	DVINA	Russia	
	OGI	Aerogisa	AEROGISA	Mexico	
	OLV	Aerolíneas Olve	OLVE	Mexico	
	OMG	Aeromega	OMEGA	United Kingdom	
	ONR	Air One Nine	EDER	Libya	ICAO code no longer allocated
	ONT	Air Ontario	ONTARIO	Canada	
	ORP	Aerocorp	CORPSA	Mexico	IATA changed to RCP; callsign changed to AEROCORPSA
	OSN	Aerosan	AEROSAN	Mexico	
	OSO	Aviapartner Limited Company		Russia	
	PAJ	Aliparma	ALIPARMA	Italy	
	PBT	Air Parabet	PARABET	Bangladesh	
8Y	PBU	Air Burundi	AIR-BURUNDI	Burundi	
	PCG	Aeropostal Cargo de Mexico	POSTAL CARGO	Mexico	
	PCK	Air Pack Express	AIRPACK EXPRESS	Spain	
	PCS	Air Palace	AIR PALACE	Mexico	
OT	PEL	Aeropelican	PELICAN	Australia	
	PEV	Peoples Vienna Line	PEOPLES	Austria	
	PFI	Aerolíneas Chihuahua	PACIFICO CHIHUAHUA	Mexico	
	PFT	Air Cargo Express International	PROFREIGHT	United States	
	PHR	Al Farana Airline	PHARAOH	Egypt	
	PHW	Ave.com	PHOENIX SHARJAH	United Arab Emirates	ICAO code no longer allocated
	PIE	Air South West	PIRATE	United Kingdom	
	PIF	Aeroservicios California Pacifico	AEROCALPA	Mexico	
	PKA	AST Pakistan Airways	PAKISTAN AIRWAY	Pakistan	
	PNL	Aero Personal	AEROPERSONAL	Mexico	
	PNU	Aero Servicios Platinum	AERO PLATINUM	Mexico	
	POY	Apoyo Aéreo	APOYO AEREO	Mexico	
	PRT	Atlantic Coast Jet	PATRIOT	United States	
AD	PRZ	Air Paradise International	RADISAIR	Indonesia	Defunct 2005
	PZA	Aéreo Taxi Paraza	AEREO PARAZA	Mexico	
QD	QCL	Air Class Líneas Aéreas	ACLA	Uruguay	
	QEA	Aviation Consultancy Office		Australia	
	QAT	Aero Taxi	AIR QUASAR	Canada	defunct
	QKC	Aero Taxi Aviation	QUAKER CITY	United States	
	QLA	Aviation Quebec Labrador	QUEBEC LABRADOR	Canada	
QS	QSC	African Safari Airways	ZEBRA	Kenya	
	QUI	Aero Quimmco	QUIMMCO	Mexico	
	RAD	Alada	AIR ALADA	Angola	
	RAI	Aerotur Air	DIASA	Kazakhstan	
	RAP	Air Center Helicopters	RAPTOR	United States	
	RBE	Aur Rum Benin	RUM BENIN	Benin	
	RBJ	Aeroserivios Del Bajio	AEROBAJIO	Mexico	
4Y	RBU	Airbus France	AIRBUS FRANCE	France	
	RBV	Air Roberval	AIR ROBERVAL	Canada	
AG	ARU	Aruba Airlines	ARUBA	Aruba	
	RCC	Air Charters Eelde	RACER	Netherlands	ICAO code and call sign no longer allocated
	RCE	Aerocer	AEROCER	Mexico	
	RCF	Aeroflot-Cargo	AEROFLOT-CARGO	Russia	
MC	RCH	Air Mobility Command	REACH	United States	United States Air Force
	RCI	Air Cassai	AIR CASSAI	Angola	
	RCO	Aero Renta De Coahuila	AEROCOAHUILA	Mexico	
	RCP	Aerocorp	AEROCORPSA	Mexico	
	RCQ	Aerolíneas Regionales	REGIONAL CARGO	Mexico	
	RCU	Atlantic S.L.	AIR COURIER	Spain	
	RCX	Air Service Center	SERVICE CENTER	Italy	
	RDM	Air Ada	AIR ADA	Mauritania	
RE	REA	Aer Arann	AER ARANN	Ireland	
	REN	Aero-Rent	AERORENT	Mexico	
	RES	Australian Maritime Safety Authority	RESCUE	Australia	
UU	REU	Air Austral	REUNION	France	
	REY	Aero-Rey	AEROREY	Mexico	
	RFC	Aero Africa	AERO AFRICA	Swaziland	
ZP	AZP	Amaszonas Paraguay	GUARANI	Paraguay	
	RFD	Aerotransportes Rafilher	RAFHILER	Mexico	
	RGO	Argo	ARGOS	Dominican Republic	
	RGR	Avior Regional	AVIOR REGIONAL	Venezuela	2014
	RGT	Airbourne School of Flying	AIRGOAT	United Kingdom	ICAO code no longer allocated
	RHL	Air Archipels	ARCHIPELS	France	
	RIF	Aviation Ministry of the Interior of the Russian Federation	INTERMIN AVIA	Russian Federation	
	RIS	Aeris Gestión	AERIS	Spain	
6K	RIT	Asian Spirit	ASIAN SPIRIT	Philippines	
	RJS	Aeroservicios Jet	ASERJET	Mexico	
	RKA	Air Afrique	AIRAFRIC	Ivory Coast	
A5	RLA	Airlinair	AIRLINAIR	France	
NZ	RLK	Air Nelson	NELSON	New Zealand	defunct
	RLL	Air Leone	AEROLEONE	Sierra Leone	
QL	RLN	Aero Lanka	AERO LANKA	Sri Lanka	
	RLZ	Air Alize	ALIZE	France	
	RMD	Air Amder	AIR AMDER	Mauritania	
R3	RME	Armenian Airlines	ARMENIAN	Armenia	defunct
MV	RML	Air Mediterranean	HELLASMED	Greece	
	RMO	Arm-Aero	ARM-AERO	Armenia	
	RMX	Air Max	AEROMAX	Bulgaria	
2O	RNE	Air Salone	AIR SALONE	Sierra Leone	
	RNM	Aeronem Air Cargo	AEROMNEM	Ecuador	
	RNR	Air Cargo Masters	RUNNER	United States	
U8	RNV	Armavia	ARMAVIA	Armenia	defunct, ICAO code no longer allocated
	ROE	Aeroeste	ESTE-BOLIVIA	Bolivia	
	ROH	Aero Gen	AEROGEN	Mexico	
	ROI	Avior Airlines	AVIOR	Venezuela	
	ROL	Aeroel Airways	AEROEL	Israel	ICAO code no longer allocated
BQ	ROM	Aeromar Lineas Aereas Dominicanas	BRAVO QUEBEC	Dominican Republic	defunct
	ROO	Aeroitalia	AEROITALIA	Italy	defunct
	ROD	Aerodan	AERODAN	Mexico	
P5	RPB	AeroRepública	AEROREPUBLICA	Colombia	
	RPC	Aerolíneas Del Pacífico	AEROPACSA	Ecuador	
	RRC	Aero Roca	AEROROCA	Mexico	
	RRE	Aerotransportes Internacionales De Torreon	AERO TORREON	Mexico	
	RSC	Aerolíneas Ejecutivas Tarascas	TARASCAS	Mexico	
E4	RSO	Aero Asia International	AERO ASIA	Pakistan	defunct
BF	RSR	Aero-Service	CONGOSERV	Republic of the Congo	
5L	RSU	AeroSur	AEROSUR	Bolivia	
	RTE	Aeronorte	LUZAVIA	Portugal	ICAO code no longer allocated
	RTH	Artis	ARTHELICO	France	
	RTO	Arhabaev Tourism Airlines	ARTOAIR	Kazakhstan	
	RTQ	Air Turquoise	TURQUOISE	France	
	RTU	Aerotucan	AEROTUCAN	Mexico	
	RUD	Air Anastasia	ANASTASIA	Ukraine	
	RUM	Air Rum	AIR RUM	Sierra Leone	
	RVP	Air VIP	AEROVIP	Portugal	
	RVT	Aircompany Veteran	AIR-VET	Armenia	
	RWB	Alliance Express Rwanda		Rwanda	Formerly Air Rwanda, revived as RwandAir after the Rwandan Genocide
	RWC	Arrow Ecuador Arrowec	ARROWEC	Ecuador	
	RWY	Aerogroup 98 Limited	TYNWALD	United Kingdom	ICAO code no longer allocated
	RXT	Aeroxtra	AERO-EXTRA	Mexico	
	RWS	Air Whitsunday		Australia	
	RZL	Aero Zambia	AERO ZAMBIA	Zambia	
	RZN	Aero Zano	ZANO	Mexico	
	RZZ	Anoka Air Charter	RED ZONE	United States	
	SBH	Aerosaab	AEROSAAB	Mexico	
	SCD	Associated Aviation	ASSOCIATED	Nigeria	
	SCM	American Jet International	SCREAMER	United States	
EX	SDO	Air Santo Domingo	AERO DOMINGO	Dominican Republic	
	SDP	Aero Sudpacifico	SUDPACIFICO	Mexico	
	SEF	Aero Servicios Ejecutivas Del Pacifico	SERVIPACIFICO	Mexico	
JR	SER	Aero California	AEROCALIFORNIA	Mexico	
	SGV	Aerosegovia	SEGOVIA	Nicaragua	
	SHH	Airshare Holdings	AIRSHARE	United Kingdom	ICAO code no longer allocated
	SIY	Aerosiyusa	SIYUSA	Mexico	
	SIZ	Aero Silza	AEROSILZA	Mexico	
	SJN	Air San Juan	SAN JUAN	United States	
	SKP	Aero-North Aviation Services	SKIPPER	Canada	defunct
	SMI	Aero Sami	SAMI	Mexico	
Z3	SMJ	Avient Aviation	AVAVIA	Zimbabwe	
	SOD	Aerolíneas Sol	ALSOL	Mexico	
	SOE	Air Soleil	AIR SOLEIL	Mauritania	
	SOG	Aero Soga	AEROSOGA	Guinea-Bissau	defunct
	SPD	Airspeed Aviation	SPEEDLINE	Canada	ICAO code no longer allocated
M3	SPJ	Air Service	AIR SKOPJE	Macedonia	
	SPO	Aeroservicios Ejecutivos Del Pacifico	EJECTUIV PACIFICO	Mexico	
	SPY	Asian Aerospace Service	THAI SPACE	Thailand	
	SPZ	Airworld	SPEED SERVICE	South Africa	
	SQR	Alsaqer Aviation	ALSAQER AVIATION	Libya	ICAO code no longer allocated
	SRI	Air Safaris and Services	AIRSAFARI	New Zealand	
	SRV	Aero Servicio Corporativo	SERVICORP	Mexico	
	SSL	Air Sultan	SIERRA SULTAN	Sierra Leone	
	SSM	Aero 1 Pro-Jet	RAPID	Canada	defunct
	SSN	Airquarius Air Charter	SUNSTREAM	South Africa	ICAO code no longer allocated
	STK	Aeropac	SAT PAK	United States	
	STT	Air St. Thomas	PARADISE	United States	
	SUE	Aerolíneas Del Sureste	AEROSURESTE	Mexico	
8D*	SUW	Astair		Russian Federation	Name changed to Interavia Airlines
	SUY	Aerial Surveys (1980) Limited	SURVEY	New Zealand	
GM	SVK	Air Slovakia	SLOVAKIA	Slovakia	ICAO code no longer allocated
R3	SYL	Aircompany Yakutia	AIR YAKUTIA	Russia	
	SYT	Aerosud Aviation	SKYTRACK	South Africa	
HC	SZN	Air Senegal	AIR SENEGAL	Senegal	
	TAA	Aeroservicios de La Costa	AERO COSTA	Mexico	
VW	TAO	Aeromar	TRANS-AEROMAR	Mexico	
	TBL	Aerotrebol	AEROTREBOL	Mexico	
	TBO	Aero Taxi de Los Cabos	AERO CABOS	Mexico	
JY	TCI	Air Turks and Caicos	KERRMONT	Turks and Caicos Islands	ICAO code no longer allocated
	TCO	Aerotranscolombina de Carga	TRANSCOLOMBIA	Colombia	
	TDG	Air Cargo Express	TURBO DOG	United States	
	TDT	Atlas Helicopters	TRIDENT	United Kingdom	
	TDY	Air Today	AIR TODAY	United States	
	TED	Aero Servicios Azteca	AEROAZTECA	Mexico	
	TIR	Antair	ANTAIR	Mexico	
	TLD	Aereo Taxi Autlan	AEREO AUTLAN	Mexico	
	TLE	Aero Util	AEROUTIL	Mexico	
	TLU	Aero Toluca International	AEROTOLUCA	Mexico	
	TME	Aero Taxi del Centro de Mexico	TAXICENTRO	Mexico	
	TOC	Aerotropical	TROPICMEX	Mexico	
	TOH	Air Tomisko	TOMISKO CARGO	Serbia	
CG	TOK	Airlines PNG	BALUS	Papua New Guinea	
	TON	Aero Tonala	AEROTONALA	Mexico	
	TPB	Aero Tropical	AERO TROPICAL	Angola	
TY	TPC	Air Calédonie	AIRCAL	France	
	TPK	Air Horizon	TCHAD-HORIZON	Chad	
	TPO	Aero Taxi del Potosi	TAXI-POTOSI	Mexico	
	TQS	Aeroturquesa	AEROTURQUESA	Mexico	
	TRH	Airmark Aviation	TRANSTAR	United States	
FL	TRS	AirTran Airways	CITRUS	United States	defunct, last flight 12/30/2014, now part of Southwest Airlines
TS	TSC	Air Transat	AIR TRANSAT	Canada	
	TSQ	airtransse	AIRTRA	Japan	
	TTB	Aerolíneas Turísticas del Caribe	AERO TURISTICAS	Mexico	
	TTE	Avcenter	TETON	United States	
	TUN	Air Tungaru	TUNGARU	Kiribati	defunct
EC	TWN	Avialeasing Aviation Company	TWINARROW	Uzbekistan	
	TXD	Aerotaxis del Noroeste	TAXI OESTE	Mexico	
	TXF	Aerotaxis Alfe	ALFE	Mexico	
	TXI	Aereotaxis	AEREOTAXIS	Mexico	
	TZA	Aero Tomza	AERO TOMZA	Mexico	
	TZT	Air Zambezi	ZAMBEZI	Zimbabwe	
	UAG	Afra Airlines	AFRALINE	Ghana	
	UAR	Aerostar Airlines	AEROSTAR	Ukraine	
	UCK	Air Division of the Eastern Kazakhstan Region	GALETA	Kazakhstan	
U7	UGA	Air Uganda	UGANDA	Uganda	
	UED	Air LA	AIR L-A	United States	
6U	UKR	Air Ukraine	AIR UKRAINE	Ukraine	
	UMB	Air Umbria	AIR UMBRIA	Italy	
	UND	Atuneros Unidos de California	ATUNEROS UNIDOS	Mexico	
	USC	AirNet Express	STAR CHECK	United States	Renamed from US Check Airlines
	VNR	Avantair	AVANTAIR	United States	defunct
	VTG	Aviação Transportes Aéreos e Cargas	ATACARGO	Angola	
	WAS	Air-Watania		Iraq	
	AAJ	Alfa Airlines	ALFA SUDAN	Sudan	
KO	AER	Alaska Central Express	ACE AIR	United States	
	AAK	Alaska Island Air	ALASKA ISLAND	United States	
KH	AAH	Aloha Air Cargo	ALOHA	United States	
AQ	AAH	Aloha Airlines	ALOHA	United States	defunct; former IATA code: TS
AA	AAL	American Airlines	AMERICAN	United States	
	XFS	American Flight Service Systems		United States	
	XMG	AMS Group		Russia	
WD*	AAN	Amsterdam Airlines	AMSTEL	Netherlands	Former IATA code: FH*. ICAO code and call sign no longer allocated
	ABI	Antigua and Barbuda Airways	Anair	Antigua and Barbuda	defunct
HO	DJA	Antinea Airlines	ANTINEA	Algeria	defunct
	EDY	Apollo Air Service	STOBART	United Kingdom	Was VLL Limited
	SRY	As-Aero		Armenia	
OZ	AAR	Asiana Airlines	ASIANA	South Korea	
	XXX	ASL (Air Service Liege)		Belgium	
AG	ABR	ASL Airlines Ireland	CONTRACT	Ireland	Former IATA Code: AG; former names: Hunting Air Cargo Airlines, Air Contractors
	XJA	Assistance Aeroportuaire de L'Aeroport de Paris		France	
	AAE	Astec Air East	AIR EAST	United States	defunct
8V	ACP	Astral Aviation	ASTRAL CARGO	Kenya	
	AAP	Astro Air International	ASTRO AIR	Philippines	defunct
	ATT	Attawasol Airlines	ATTAWASOL AIR	Libya	
XM	XME	Australian airExpress	AUS-CARGO	Australia	
AO	AUZ	Australian Airlines	AUSTRALIAN	Australia	Subsidiary merged with Qantas
	VAI	Avalair	AIR AVALAIR	Serbia	
XP	VXP	Avelo Airlines	AVELO	United States	Former ICAO code: CXP; former names: Casino Express Airlines, Xtra Airways
VE	AVE	Avensa	AVENSA	Venezuela	defunct
	VRT	Averitt Air Charter	AVERITT	United States	
	VSC	AVESCA	AVESCA	Colombia	defunct
	AJF	Avia Consult Flugbetriebs	AVIACONSULT	Austria	
	VTT	Avia Trans Air Transport	VIATRANSPORT	Sudan	
6A	CHP	Aviacsa	AVIACSA	Mexico	
AV	AVA	Avianca	AVIANCA	Colombia	
A0	MCJ	Avianca Argentina	JETMAC	Argentina	Owned by Synergy Group
O6	ONE	Avianca Brasil	OCEAN AIR	Brazil	Owned by Synergy Group
2K	GLG	Avianca Ecuador	GALAPAGOS	Ecuador	Aerolíneas Galápagos SA
	XAV	Aviaprom Enterprises	AVIAPROM	Russia	
	AVB	Aviation Beauport	BEAUPAIR	United Kingdom	
	AVQ	Aviation Services, Inc.	AQUILINE	United States	
	ACJ	Avicon	AVICHARTER	Kenya	
	VSR	Aviostart AS	AVIOSTART	Bulgaria	
V5	VLI	Avolar Aerolíneas	AEROVOLAR	Mexico	defunct
	VSA	Avstar Aviation	STARBIRD	South Africa	
AD	AZU	Azul Linhas Aéreas Brasileiras	Azul	Brazil	
	BBF	B-Air Charter	SPEEDCHARTER	Germany	2014
CJ	CFE	BA CityFlyer	FLYER	United Kingdom	
TH	BRT	BA Connect	BRITISH	United Kingdom	defunct
	EFW	BA Euroflyer	GRIFFIN	United Kingdom	British Airways subsidiary based at London Gatwick
	BAC	BAC Leasing Limited		United Kingdom	
B4	BCF	BACH Flugbetriebsges	BACH	Austria	
	BOB	Backbone A/S	BACKBONE	Denmark	
J4	BDR	Badr Airlines	BADR AIR	Sudan	
	BAE	BAE Systems	FELIX	United Kingdom	Corporate Air Travel
UP	BHS	Bahamasair	BAHAMAS	Bahamas	
	BAB	Bahrain Air BSC (Closed)	AWAL	Bahrain	
	BFW	Bahrain Defence Force	SUMMAN	Bahrain	
	BXA	Bahrain Executive Air Services	BEXAIR	Bahrain	
	BJA	Baja Air	BAJA AIR	Mexico	
8Q*	BAJ	Baker Aviation	RODEO	United States	
	OGJ	Bakoji Airlines Services	BAKO AIR	Nigeria	
V9	BTC	BAL Bashkirian Airlines	BASHKIRIAN	Russia	
	BEF	Balear Express	BALEAR EXPRESS	Spain	
	BLN	Bali International Air Service	BIAR	Indonesia	
	BAA	Balkan Agro Aviation	BALKAN AGRO	Bulgaria	
LZ	LAZ	Balkan Bulgarian Airlines	BALKAN	Bulgaria	defunct
	BHI	Balkh Airlines	SHARIF	Afghanistan	
	PNT	Balmoral Central Contracts	PORTNET	South Africa	
BQ	BTL	Baltia Air Lines	BALTIA	United States	Callsign changed from "BALTIA FLIGHT" in 2015
	BLL	Baltic Airlines	BALTIC AIRLINES	Russia	
	BLT	Baltic Aviation	BALTAIR	United States	
	BJC	Baltic Jet Aircompany	BALTIC JET	Latvia	
	BTH	Baltijas Helicopters	BALTIJAS HELICOPTERS	Latvia	
	CPJ	Baltimore Air Transport	CORPJET	United States	
	EAH	Baltimore Airways	EASTERN	United States	
	BTK	Baltyka	BALTYKA	Ukraine	
QH	BAV	Bamboo Airways	BAMBOO	Vietnam	
QO	AJC	Bar Harbor Airlines	BAR HARBOR	United States	
		BAX Global			
	AUJ	Business Flight Salzburg	AUSTROJET	Austria	
	CWR	Beijing City International Jet	CITY WORLD	China	
	BJV	Beijing Vistajet Aviation	BEIJING VISTA	China	
	BHK	Blu Halkin	BLUEHAKIN	United Kingdom	
	BXJ	Brixtel Group	BRIXTEL JET	United States	
	BYG	Bygone Aviation	BYGONE	United States	
	BBJ	Blue Air Lines	BLUE KOREA	South Korea	
	BCJ	Blue Jet Charters	BLUE BOY	Poland	
	BNA	Bun Air Corporation	BUN AIR	United States	
B3	BTN	Bhutan Airlines	BHUTAN AIR	Bhutan	
	BAF	Belgian Air Force	BELGIAN AIRFORCE	Belgium	
	BAK	Blackhawk Airways	BLACKHAWK	United States	
L9	BAL	Belle Air Europe	BELLEAIR EUROPE	Italy	Previously Britannia Airways
	BAL	Britannia Airways	BRITANNIA	United Kingdom	Defunct
	BAM	Business Air Services	BUSINESS AIR	Canada	
	BAN	British Antarctic Survey	PENGUIN	United Kingdom	
	BAR	Bradly Air (Charter) Services	BRADLEY	Canada	
	BAU	Bissau Airlines	AIR BISSAU	Guinea-Bissau	
	BAV	Bay Aviation Ltd	BAY AIR	Bangladesh	
BA	BAW	British Airways	SPEEDBIRD	United Kingdom	
	BAX	Best Aero Handling Ltd		Russia	
	BAY	Bravo Airways	BRAVOAVIANCA	Ukraine	
	BBA	Bannert Air	BANAIR	Austria	
BG	BBC	Biman Bangladesh Airlines	BANGLADESH	Bangladesh	
BO	BBD	Bluebird Nordic	BLUE CARGO	Iceland	
	BBS	Beibars CJSC	BEIBARS	Kazakhstan	
	BBV	Bravo Airlines	BRAVO EUROPE	Spain	
BO	BBW	BB Airways	BEEBEE AIRWAYS	Nepal	
	BBZ	Bluebird Aviation	COBRA	Kenya	
SI	BCI	Blue Islands	BLUE ISLAND	United Kingdom	
EO	BCL	British Caribbean Airways		United Kingdom	defunct
	BCR	British Charter	BACKER	United Kingdom	
	BCT	BCT Aviation	BOBCAT	United Kingdom	
	BCV	Business Aviation Center	BUSINESS AVIATION	Ukraine	
WX	BCY	CityJet	CITY JET	Ireland	
BZ	BDA	Blue Dart Aviation	BLUE DART	India	
JA	BON	B&H Airlines	Air Bosna	Bosnia and Herzegovina	
	BDF	Bissau Discovery Flying Club	BISSAU DISCOVERY	Guinea-Bissau	
	AYB	Belgian Army	BELGIAN ARMY	Belgium	
	BEA	Best Aviation Ltd	BEST AIR	Bangladesh	
	BED	Belgorod Air Enterprise	BELOGORYE	Russia	defunct
	BEH	Bel Air Helicopters	BLUECOPTER	Denmark	
	BEK	Berkut Air	BERKUT	Kazakhstan	
	BET	BETA - Brazilian Express Transportes Aéreos	BETA CARGO	Brazil	
	BFC	Basler Flight Service	BASLER	United States	
	BFG	Bear Flight	BEARFLIGHT	Sweden	
J4	BFL	Buffalo Airways	BUFFALO	Canada	
	BFO	Bombardier	BOMBARDIER	Canada	
	BFR	Burkina Airlines	BURKLINES	Burkina Faso	
	BFS	Business Flight Sweden	BUSINESS FLIGHT	Sweden	
8H	BGH	BH Air	BALKAN HOLIDAYS	Bulgaria	
	BGI	British Gulf International	BRITISH GULF	São Tomé and Príncipe	
	BGK	British Gulf International-Fez	GULF INTER	Kyrgyzstan	
A8	BGL	Benin Golf Air	BENIN GOLF	Benin	
	BGM	Bugulma Air Enterprise	BUGAVIA	Russia	
	BGR	Budget Air Bangladesh	BUDGET AIR	Bangladesh	
	BGT	Bergen Air Transport	BERGEN AIR	Norway	
U4	BHA	Buddha Air	BUDDHA AIR	Nepal	
UH	BHL	Bristow Helicopters	BRISTOW	United Kingdom	
	BHN	Bristow Helicopters Nigeria	BRISTOW HELICOPTERS	Nigeria	
	BHO	Bhoja Airlines	BHOJA	Pakistan	
4T	BHP	Belair Airlines	BELAIR	Switzerland	
	BHR	Bighorn Airways	BIGHORN AIR	United States	
	BHT	Bright Air	BRIGHTAIR	Netherlands	ICAO code and call sign no longer allocated
E6		Bringer Air Cargo Taxi Aéreo		Brazil	
	BHY	Bosphorus European Airways	BOSPHORUS	Turkey	
	BID	Binair	BINAIR	Germany	
	BIG	Big Island Air	BIG ISLE	United States	
BS	BIH	British International Helicopters	BRINTEL	United Kingdom	
	BIL	Billund Air Center	BILAIR	Denmark	
	BIN	Boise Interagency Fire Center	BISON-AIR	United States	
	BIO	Bioflight A/S	BIOFLIGHT	Denmark	
	BIR	Bird Leasing	BIRD AIR	United States	
	BIZ	Bizjet Ltd	BIZZ	United Kingdom	
	BJS	Business Jet Solutions	SOLUTION	United States	
B4	BKA	Bankair	BANKAIR	United States	
	BKF	BF-Lento OY	BAKERFLIGHT	Finland	
	BKK	Blink	BLINKAIR	United Kingdom	
	BKJ	Barken International	BARKEN JET	United States	
PG	BKP	Bangkok Airways	BANGKOK AIR	Thailand	
	BKV	Bukovyna	BUKOVYNA	Ukraine	
	BLB	Blue Bird Aviation	BLUEBIRD SUDAN	Sudan	
	BLC	Bellesavia	BELLESAVIA	Belarus	
	BLE	Blue Line	BLUE BERRY	France	
KF	BLF	Blue1	BLUEFIN	Finland	
	BLG	Belgavia	BELGAVIA	Belgium	
	BLH	Blue Horizon Travel Club	BLUE HORIZON	United States	
	BLJ	Blue Jet	BLUEWAY	Spain	
	BLM	Blue Sky Airlines	BLUE ARMENIA	Armenia	defunct
JV	BLS	Bearskin Lake Air Service	BEARSKIN	Canada	
B3	BLV	Bellview Airlines	BELLVIEW AIRLINES	Nigeria	
BD	BMA	BMI	MIDLAND	United Kingdom	defunct
2T	BMA	BermudAir	GOSLING	Bermuda	
BM	BMR	BMI Regional	MIDLAND	United Kingdom	
	BMD	British Medical Charter	BRITISH MEDICAL	United Kingdom	
	BME	Briggs Marine Environmental Services	BRIGGS	United Kingdom	
	BMH	Bristow Masayu Helicopters	MASAYU	Indonesia	
WW	BMI	Bmibaby	BABY	United Kingdom	defunct
CH	BMJ	Bemidji Airlines	BEMIDJI	United States	
5Z	BML	Bismillah Airlines	BISMILLAH	Bangladesh	IATA code in use by another company
	BMN	Bowman Aviation	BOWMAN	United States	
	BMW	BMW	BMW-FLIGHT	Germany	
	BMX	Banco de Mexico	BANXICO	Mexico	
	BND	Bond Offshore Helicopters	BOND	United Kingdom	
	BNE	Benina Air	BENINA AIR	Libya	
BN	BNF	Braniff International Airways	Braniff	United States	defunct
	BNG	BN Group Limited	VECTIS	United Kingdom	
	BNJ	Air Service Liège (ASL)	JET BELGIUM	Belgium	
	BNL	Blue Nile Ethiopia Trading	NILE TRADING	Ethiopia	
	BNR	Bonair Aviation	BONAIR	Canada	
	BNS	Bancstar - Valley National Corporation	BANCSTAR	United States	
	BNT	Bentiu Air Transport	BENTIU AIR	Sudan	
	BNV	Benane Aviation Corporation	BENANE	Mauritania	
	BNW	British North West Airlines	BRITISH NORTH	United Kingdom	
	BOD	Bond Air Services	UGABOND	Uganda	
	BOA	Boniair	KUMANOVO	North Macedonia	
AB	BNZ	Bonza	BONZA	Australia	Defunct
	BOE	Boeing	BOEING	United States	
	BOF	Bordaire	BORDAIR	Canada	
	BOO	Bookajet Limited	BOOKAJET	United Kingdom	
BO	BOU	Bouraq Indonesia Airlines	BOURAQ	Indonesia	
BV	BPA	Blue Panorama Airlines	BLUE PANORAMA	Italy	
	BPK	Berkhut ZK	VENERA	Kazakhstan	
	BPO	Bundespolizei-Fliegertruppe	PIROL	Germany	
	BPS	Budapest Aircraft Services/Manx2	BASE	Hungary	
	BPT	Bonus Aviation	BONUS	United Kingdom	
	BPX	British Petroleum Exploration		Colombia	
7R	BRB	BRA-Transportes Aéreos	BRA-TRANSPAEREOS	Brazil	
	BRD	Brock Air Services	BROCK AIR	Canada	
	BRE	Breeze Ltd	AVIABREEZE	Ukraine	
8E	BRG	Bering Air	BERING AIR	United States	
	BRK	Briansk State Air Enterprise	BRIANSK-AVIA	Russia	
	BRN	Branson Airlines	BRANSON	United States	
	BRO	BASE Regional Airlines	COASTRIDER	Netherlands	ICAO code in use by another company, call sign no longer allocated
	BRS	Brazilian Air Force	BRAZILIAN AIR FORCE	Brazil	
TH	BRT	British Regional Airlines	BRITISH	United Kingdom	defunct
B2	BRU	Belavia Belarusian Airlines	BELARUS AVIA	Belarus	
	BRV	Bravo Air Congo	BRAVO	Democratic Republic of the Congo	defunct
	BRW	Bright Aviation Services	BRIGHT SERVICES	Bulgaria	
	BRX	Buffalo Express Airlines	BUFF EXPRESS	United States	
	BRY	Burundayavia	BURAIR	Kazakhstan	
	BSC	Bistair - Fez	BIG SHOT	Kyrgyzstan	
	BSD	Blue Star Airlines	AIRLINES STAR	Mexico	
	BSI	Brasair Transportes Aéreos	BRASAIR	Brazil	
	BSJ	Blue Swan Aviation	BLUE SWAN	United Kingdom	ICAO Code and callsign (BSJ/BLUE SWAN) withdrawn
	BSM	Blue Sky Aviation		Lebanon	
	BSS	Bissau Aero Transporte	BISSAU AIRSYSTEM	Guinea-Bissau	
	BST	Best Air	TUNCA	Turkey	
	BSW	Blue Sky Airways	SKY BLUE	Czech Republic	
GQ	BSY	Big Sky Airlines	BIG SKY	United States	
	BTI	Air Baltic	Air Baltic	Latvia	
ID	BTK	Batik Air	BATIK	Indonesia	
4B	BTQ	Boutique Air	BOUTIQUE	United States	
	BTR	Botir-Avia	BOTIR-AVIA	Kyrgyzstan	
	BTT	BT-Slavuta	BEETEE-SLAVUTA	Ukraine	
Y6	BTV	Batavia Air	BATAVIA	Indonesia	As of June 1, 2010, IATA code changed to Y6.
L9	BTZ	Bristow U.S. LLC	BRISTOW	United States	
H6	BUC	European Air Charter	EUROCHARTER	Bulgaria	previously Bulgarian Air Charter
	BUL	Blue Airlines	BLUE AIRLINES	Democratic Republic of the Congo	
BU	BUN	Buryat Airlines Aircompany	BURAL	Russia	
	BUZ	Buzz Stansted	BUZZ	United Kingdom	
	BVA	Buffalo Airways	BUFFALO AIR	United States	
	BVC	Bulgarian Aeronautical Centre	BULGARIAN WINGS	Bulgaria	
	BVN	Baron Aviation Services	SHOW-ME	United States	
J8	BVT	Berjaya Air	BERJAYA	Malaysia	
B3	BVU	Bellview Airlines, Sierra Leone	BELLVIEW AIRLINES	Sierra Leone	
	BWD	Bluewest Helicopters-Greenland	BLUEWEST	Denmark	
QW	BWG	Blue Wings	BLUE WINGS	Germany	defunct
	BWI	Blue Wing Airlines	BLUE TAIL	Suriname	
	BWL	British World Airlines	BRITWORLD	United Kingdom	
	BXH	Bar XH Air	PALLISER	Canada	
SN	BXI	Brussels Airlines	XENIA	Belgium	defunct as Brussels International Airlines in 2001
	BYA	Berry Aviation	BERRY	United States	
	BYC	Cambodia Bayon Airlines	Bayon Air	Cambodia	
	BYF	San Carlos Flight Center	BAY FLIGHT	United States	
	BYL	Bylina Joint-Stock Company	BYLINA	Russia	
	BYR	Berytos Airlines		Lebanon	
	BYE	Bayu Indonesia Air	BAYU	Indonesia	
	BZA	Bizair Fluggesellschaft	BERLIN BEAR	Germany	
DB	BZH	Brit Air	BRITAIR	France	
	BZZ	Butane Buzzard Aviation Corporation	BUZZARD	United Kingdom	
JD	CBJ	Beijing Capital Airlines	CAPITAL JET	China	
	CKM	BKS Air (Rivaflecha)	COSMOS	Spain	
	CLF	Bristol Flying Centre	CLIFTON	United Kingdom	
	CLN	Barnes Olsen Aeroleasing	SEELINE	United Kingdom	
E9	CXS	Boston-Maine Airways	CLIPPER CONNECTION	United States	Pan Am Clipper Connection Pan Am III
SN	BEL	Brussels Airlines	BEE-LINE	Belgium	
	EBA	Bond Aviation	BOND AVIATION	Italy	
	EXB	Brazilian Army Aviation	BRAZILIAN ARMY	Brazil	
	EXP	Business Express Delivery	EXPRESS AIR	Canada	
	FOS	Bel Limited		Russia	
	GAA	Business Express	BIZEX	United States	
	HAW	Bangkok Aviation Center	THAI HAWK	Thailand	
	HAX	Benair	SCOOP	Norway	
NT	IBB	Binter Canarias	BINTER	Spain	
	IRJ	Bonyad Airlines	BONYAD AIR	Iran	
	IVR	Burundaiavia	RERUN	Kazakhstan	
0B	BLA	Blue Air	BLUE AIR	Romania	
KJ	LAJ	British Mediterranean Airways	BEE MED	United Kingdom	defunct
	LBY	Belle Air	ALBAN-BELLE	Albania	
	LED	Blom Geomatics	SWEEPER	Norway	
	LTL	Benin Littoral Airways	LITTORAL	Benin	
	LXJ	Bombardier Business Jet Solutions	FLEXJET	United States	
FB	LZB	Bulgaria Air	FLYING BULGARIA	Bulgaria	
	MBR	Brazilian Navy Aviation	BRAZILIAN NAVY	Brazil	
8N	NKF	Barents AirLink	NORDFLIGHT	Sweden	previously Nordkalottflyg
	NYB	Belgian Navy	BELGIAN NAVY	Belgium	
	OTA	Business Aviators	OUTLAW	United States	2014
	OUF	Beijing Eofa International Jet	ELEMENT	China	2014
	PEB	Benders Air	PALEMA	Sweden	
	POI	BGB Air	BOJBAN	Kazakhstan	
	PPS	Butte Aviation	PIPESTONE	United States	
	PVO	Bearing Supplies Limited	PROVOST	United Kingdom	
	RHD	Bond Air Services	RED HEAD	United Kingdom	
	RLR	Business Airfreight	RATTLER	United States	
	RRS	Boscombe Down DERA (Formation)	BLACKBOX	United Kingdom	
	SCJ	Business Jet Sweden	SCANJET	Sweden	
	SHT	British Airways Shuttle	SHUTTLE	United Kingdom	BA domestic services
	SKH	British Sky Broadcasting	SKYNEWS	United Kingdom	
	TBL	Bell Aliant Regional Communications	TELCO	Canada	
	TXB	Bell Helicopter Textron	TEXTRON	Canada	
	UKA	Buzzaway Limited	UKAY	United Kingdom	
	VLX	Biz Jet Charter	AVOLAR	United States	
	VOL	Blue Chip Jet	BLUE SPEED	Sweden	
	WFD	BAE Systems	AVRO	United Kingdom	Woodford Flight Test
	WTN	BAE Systems	TARNISH	United Kingdom	Warton Military Flight Ops
	XBO	Baseops International		United States	
	XDA	Bureau Veritas		France	
	XMS	British Airways Santa	SANTA	United Kingdom	Christmas charter flights
	ZBA	Boskovic Air Charters Limited	BOSKY	Kenya	
	JMP	Businesswings	JUMP RUN	Germany	
OB	BOV	Boliviana de Aviación	BOLIVIANA	Bolivia	
YB	BRJ	Borajet	BORA JET	Turkey	
MX	MXY	Breeze Airways	MOXY	United States	
AU	CJL	Canada Jetlines	JETBUS	Canada	Defunct
VL	LHX	City Airlines	CITYAIR	Germany	LH subsidiary Allocated in 2023
	SRJ	C Air Jet Airlines	SYRJET	Syria	
	TIP	C and M Aviation	TRANSPAC	United States	
	ORO	C N Air	CAPRI	Spain	
	RWG	C&M Airways	RED WING	United States	
	RMU	C.S.P., Societe	AIR-MAUR	Mauritania	
	CJZ	Caliber Jet	CALIBER JET	United States	
4A	DYN	California Pacific Airlines	AERODYNAMICS	United States	Defunct
QC	CRC	Camair-Co	CAMAIRCO	Cameroon	
	QAI	Conquest Air	CHICKPEA	United States	2014
	CBH	Corporate Eagle Management Services	CLUB HOUSE	United States	Allocated in 2014
	CRF	Croix Rouge Francais	CROIX ROUGE	France	2014
	CAA	Civil Aviation Authority of the Czech Republic	INSPECTOR	Czech Republic	
	BKR	Civil Air Patrol South Carolina Wing	BOX KAR	United States	
	BFN	Compagnie Nationale Naganagani		Burkina Faso	
	AWX	Civil Aviation Authority Directorate of Airspace Policy	ALLWEATHER	United Kingdom	
	BBN	Civil Aviation Authority Airworthiness Division	BRABAZON	United Kingdom	
	ATQ	CHC Helicopters Nigeria	COLIBRI	Nigeria	
	APL	Corporativo Aereo Principal	AEREO PRINCIPAL	Mexico	
	AIO	Chief of Staff, United States Air Force	AIR CHIEF	United States	
	AID	Christian Konig - Century Airbirds	CENTURY AIRBIRD	Austria	
		Cambridge Recurrent Training	CAMBRIDGE	United Kingdom	
		California Department of Forestry and Fire Protection	CALFIRE	United States	
		Careflight Queensland	SAMARITAN	Australia	
		Castle Air Charter	CASTLEFILM	United Kingdom	
		Challenges Aviation	TIGER	United Kingdom	
		Challenges Limited	HERITAGE	United Kingdom	
		Cheqair	ASTON	United Kingdom	
		Clacton Aero Club	CLASSIC WINGS	United Kingdom	
		Coral Sun Airways	CORAL SUN	Kiribati	
		Cowan Group	COWAN	United States	
	SMW	Carpatair Flight Service	SMART WINGS	Romania	Was Carpatair Flight Training
	CCL	Cambodia Airlines	ANGKOR WAT	Cambodia	
KR	KME	Cambodia Airways	GIANT IBIS	Cambodia	
	CCB	Caricom Airways	DOLPHIN	Barbados	
	CYH	China Southern Airlines Henan	YUHAO	China	
	CFB	Chongqing Forebase General Aviation	FOREBASE	China	
	XCA	Colt Transportes Aereos	COLT	Brazil	
	GCY	CHC Global Operations International	HELIBIRD	United Kingdom	
	AUN	Common Sky	COMMON SKY	Austria	
	CBI	Cabi	CABI	Ukraine	
	CPI	Compagnia Aeronautica Italiana	AIRCAI	Italy	
5C	ICL	Challenge Airlines IL	CAL	Israel	ex CAL-Cargo Air Lines
	CMR	CAM Air Management	CAMEO	United Kingdom	
	CTZ	CATA Línea Aérea	CATA	Argentina	
	CCF	CCF Manager Airline	TOMCAT	Germany	
	CED	CEDTA (Compañía Ecuatoriana De Transportes Aéreos)	CEDTA	Ecuador	
	HBI	CHC Denmark	HELIBIRD	Denmark	
	HEM	CHC Helicopter	HEMS	Australia	
AW	SCH	CHC Airways	SCHREINER	Netherlands	formerly Schreiner Airways. ICAO code in use by another company, call sign no longer allocated
	HKS	CHC Helikopter Service	HELIBUS	Norway	
	VCI	CI-Tours	CI-TOURS	Ivory Coast	
	CKC	CKC Services		United States	
	CMZ	CM Stair	CEE-EM STAIRS	Mauritania	
	CNT	Centre national d'études des télécommunications - C.N.E.T.	KNET	France	
	OAP	COAPA AIR	COAPA	Mexico	
	PDR	COMAV	SPEEDSTER	Namibia	
	CRH	CRI Helicopters Mexico	HELI-MEX	Mexico	
	IRO	CSA Air	IRON AIR	United States	
	CSE	CSE Aviation	OXFORD	United Kingdom	
	CTQ	CTK Network Aviation	CITYLINK	Ghana	
	CBR	Cabair College of Air Training	CABAIR	United Kingdom	
	CVE	Cabo Verde Express	KABEX	Cape Verde	
	CWD	Caernarfon Airworld	AMBASSADOR	United Kingdom	
	CXE	Caicos Express Airways	CAICOS	Turks and Caicos Islands	
	CCE	Cairo Air Transport Company		Egypt	
	CGC	Cal Gulf Aviation	CAL-GULF	São Tomé and Príncipe	
	REZ	Cal-West Aviation	CAL AIR	United States	
	CSL	California Air Shuttle	CALIFORNIA SHUTTLE	United States	
3C	CMV	Calima Aviación	CALIMA	Spain	
MO	CAV	Calm Air	CALM AIR	Canada	
R9	CAM	Camai Air	AIR CAMAI	United States	Village Aviation
K6	KHV	Cambodia Angkor Air	ANGKOR AIR	Cambodia	
UY	UYC	Cameroon Airlines	CAM-AIR	Cameroon	Defunct
	HSO	Campania Helicopteros De Transporte	HELIASTURIAS	Spain	
C6	CJA	CanJet	CANJET	Canada	
	PIL	Canada Jet Charters	PINNACLE	Canada	
CP	CDN	Canadian Airlines	CANADIAN	Canada	Defunct
	CTG	Canadian Coast Guard	CANADIAN COAST GUARD	Canada	
	HIA	Canadian Eagle Aviation	HAIDA	Canada	
	CFC	Canadian Forces	CANFORCE	Canada	
	BZD	Canadian Global Air Ambulance	BLIZZARD	Canada	ICAO Code and callsign no longer allocated
	CDN	Canadian Helicopters	CANADIAN	Canada	
	TKR	Canadian Interagency Forest Fire Centre	TANKER	Canada	ICAO Code and callsign no longer allocated
	XNC	Canadian National Telecommunications		Canada	ICAO Code and callsign no longer allocated
7F	AKT	Canadian North	ARCTIC	Canada	Air Norterra
CP	CPC	Canadian Pacific Airlines	EMPRESS	Canada	ICAO Code and callsign no longer allocated
	CDR	Canadian Regional Airlines	CANADIAN REGIONAL	Canada	ICAO Code and callsign no longer allocated
	CWH	Canadian Warplane Heritage Museum	WARPLANE HERITAGE	Canada	
W2	CWA	Canadian Western Airlines	CANADIAN WESTERN	Canada	
	CWW	Canair	CANAIR	China	
	CUI	Cancun Air	CAN-AIR	Mexico	
9K	KAP	Cape Air	CAIR	United States	
	CTO	Cape Air Transport		Australia	
	SEM	Cape Central Airways	SEMO	United States	
	CMY	Cape Smythe Air	CAPE SMYTHE AIR	United States	
	CPX	Capital Air Service	CAPAIR	United States	
	CPD	Capital Airlines	CAPITAL DELTA	Kenya	
	NCP	Capital Airlines Limited	CAPITAL SHUTTLE	Nigeria	
PT	CCI	Capital Cargo International Airlines	CAPPY	United States	Allocation deleted 2013
	CCQ	Capital City Air Carriers	CAP CITY	United States	
	EGL	Capital Trading Aviation	PRESTIGE	United Kingdom	
	CEX	Capitol Air Express	CAPITOL EXPRESS	United States	
	CWZ	Capitol Wings Airline	CAPWINGS	United States	
	VAN	Caravan Air	CAMEL	Mauritania	
	CWN	Cardiff Wales Flying Club	CAMBRIAN	United Kingdom	
	FVA	Cardinal/Air Virginia	AIR VIRGINIA	United States	
	GOL	Cardolaar	CARGOLAAR	Namibia	
	CDI	Cards Air Services	CARDS	Philippines	
	CFH	CareFlight	CARE FLIGHT	Australia	
	CDM	Carga Aérea Dominicana	CARGA AEREA	Dominican Republic	
	EST	Carga Express Internacional	CARGAINTER	Mexico	
GG	GGC	Cargo 360	LONG-HAUL	United States	
	MCX	Cargo Express	MAURICARGO	Mauritania	
	CRV	Cargo Ivoire	CARGOIV	Ivory Coast	
	CLM	Cargo Link (Caribbean)	CARGO LINK	Barbados	
P3	CLU	Cargo Logic Air	FIREBIRD	United Kingdom	
	CTW	Cargo Three	THIRD CARGO	Panama	
2G	CRG	Cargoitalia	WHITE PELICAN	Italy	
W8	CJT	Cargojet Airways	CARGOJET	Canada	
CV	CLX	Cargolux	CARGOLUX	Luxembourg	
C8	ICV	Cargolux Italia	CARGO MED	Italy	
	CGM	Cargoman	HOTEL CHARLIE	Oman	
	DEL	Carib Aviation	RED TAIL	Antigua and Barbuda	
	BCB	Carib Express	WAVEBIRD	Barbados	
	PWD	CARIBAIR	CARIBAIR	Dominican Republic	
	DCC	Caribbean Air Cargo	CARICARGO	Barbados	
	CLT	Caribbean Air Transport	CARIBBEAN	Netherlands	ICAO Code and callsign no longer allocated
	CLT	Club Aerocelta de Vuelo Con Motor		Spain	
BW	BWA	Caribbean Airlines	CARIBBEAN AIRLINES	Trinidad and Tobago	
	IQQ	Caribbean Airways	CARIBJET	Barbados	
	CSX	Choice Airways	CHOICE AIR	United States	
	TLC	Caribbean Express	CARIB-X	United States	
8B	GFI	Caribbean Star Airlines	CARIB STAR	Antigua and Barbuda	
	CRB	Caricom Airways	CARIBBEAN COMMUTER	Suriname	
	CRT	Caribintair	CARIBINTAIR	Haiti	
	CVG	Carill Aviation	CARILL	United Kingdom	
V3	KRP	Carpatair	CARPATAIR	Romania	
	CRR	Carranza	CARRANZA	Chile	Defunct
	ULS	Carroll Air Service	ULSTER	United States	
	CMT	Casement Aviation	CASEMENT	United States	
	CSO	Casino Airline	CASAIR	United States	
	CSP	Casper Air Service	CASPER AIR	United States	
RV	CPN	Caspian Airlines	CASPIAN	Iran	
	CSJ	Castle Aviation	CASTLE	United States	
	CAZ	Cat Aviation	EUROCAT	Switzerland	
	CBT	Catalina Flying Boats	CATALINA AIR	United States	
	TEX	Catex	CATEX	France	
KA	HDA	Cathay Dragon	DRAGON	Hong Kong	Defunct; IATA Code transferred to Aero Nomad Airlines
CX	CPA	Cathay Pacific	CATHAY	Hong Kong	
	CJR	Caverton Helicopters	CAVERTON AIR	Nigeria	
KX	CAY	Cayman Airways	CAYMAN	Cayman Islands	
5J	CEB	Cebu Pacific	CEBU	Philippines	
	CIL	Cecil Aviation	CECIL	United Kingdom	
	CEG	Cega Aviation	CEGA	United Kingdom	
	CEC	Celtic Airways	CELTAIR	United Kingdom	
	CWE	Celtic West	CELTIC	United Kingdom	
	CEV	Centre d'Essais en Vol	CENTEV	France	
	CNL	Centennial Airlines	WYO-AIR	United States	
	CNS	Cobalt Air LLC	CHRONOS	United States	
	CVO	Center Vol	CENTERVOL	Spain	
	CTS	Center-South	CENTER-SOUTH	Russia	
	CET	Centrafrican Airlines	CENTRAFRICAIN	Central African Republic	
	CAX	Central Air Express	CENTRAL EXPRESS	Democratic Republic of the Congo	
	CTL	Central Airlines	CENTRAL COMMUTER	United States	
	CNY	Central Airways	CENTRAL LEONE	Sierra Leone	
	ACN	Central American Airlines	AEROCENTRO	Nicaragua	
	YOG	Central Aviation	YOGAN AIR	United States	
	DRN	Central De Discos De Reynosa	DISCOS REYNOSA	Mexico	
2C	CMA	CMA-CGM AIRCARGO	FRENCH CARGO	France	
	CHA	Central Flying Service	CHARTER CENTRAL	United States	
	CEM	Central Mongolia Airways	CENTRAL MONGOLIA	Mongolia	
9M	GLR	Central Mountain Air	GLACIER	Canada	
	CQC	Central Queensland Aviation College		Australia	
	CSI	Central Skyport	SKYPORT	United States	
	CLW	Centralwings	CENTRALWINGS	Poland	
	DTV	Centre Airlines	DUTCH VALLEY	United States	
	CGS	Centre of Applied Geodynamica	GEO CENTRE	Russia	
J7	CVC	Centre-Avia	AVIACENTRE	Russia	
	CCV	Centro De Helicopteros Corporativos	HELICORPORATIVO	Mexico	
	ACF	Centro de Formación Aeronáutica de Canarias	FORCAN	Spain	
WE	CWC	Centurion Air Cargo	CHALLENGE CARGO	United States	
	URY	Century Aviation	CENTURY AVIA	Mexico	
	HAI	Century Aviation International		Canada	
	XAD	Certified Air Dispatch		United States	
	CER	Cetraca Aviation Service	CETRACA	Democratic Republic of the Congo	
	IRU	Chabahar Airlines	CHABAHAR	Iran	
CS	CSW	Chair Airlines	EIGER	Switzerland	
	CLG	Chalair Aviation	CHALLAIR	France	
OP	CHK	Chalk's International Airlines	CHALKS	United States	
	CLS	Challenge Air Transport	AIRISTO	Germany	
	CHS	Challenge Aviation	CHALLENGE AVIATION	Australia	
	OFF	Challenge International Airlines	CHALLENGE AIR	United States	
	CHG	Challenge Airlines BE	Challenge	Belgium	
	CPH	Champagne Airlines	CHAMPAGNE	France	
MG	CCP	Champion Air	CHAMPION AIR	United States	
	NCH	Chanchangi Airlines	CHANCHANGI	Nigeria	
2Z	CGN	Chang An Airlines	CHANGAN	China	
	CHN	Channel Island Aviation	CHANNEL	United States	
	WML	Chantilly Air	MARLIN	United States	
	CPL	Chaparral Airlines	CHAPARRAL	United States	
S8	CSU	Chari Aviation Services	CHARI SERVICE	Chad	
	CAH	Charlan Air Charter	CHARLAN	South Africa	ICAO Code and callsign no longer allocated
	HMD	Charlie Hammonds Flying Service	HAMMOND	United States	
	CGD	Charlotte Air National Guard		United States	
	CHW	Charter Air	CHARTER WIEN	Austria	
	HRT	Chartright Air	CHARTRIGHT	Canada	
RP*	CHQ	Chautauqua Airlines	CHAUTAUQUA	United States	Was US*
	CBB	Cheboksary Airenterprise JSC	CHEBAIR	Russia	
	CHM	Chemech Aviation		Pakistan	
	CHZ	Cherline	CHERL	Russia	
	CMK	Chernomor-Avia	CHERAVIA	Russia	
	CBM	Cherokee Express	BLUE MAX	United States	
	CCY	Cherry Air	CHERRY	United States	
	CAB	Chesapeake Air Service	CHESAPEAKE AIR	United States	
	CVR	Chevron U.S.A	CHEVRON	United States	
	CYA	Cheyenne Airways	CHEYENNE AIR	United States	
	CGO	Chicago Air	WILD ONION	United States	
C8	WDY	Chicago Jet Group	WINDY CITY	United States	
	RAT	Chief Rat Flight Services	RIVERRAT	South Africa	Defunct
	CCH	Chilchota Taxi Aéreo	CHILCHOTA	Mexico	
	DES	Chilcotin Caribou Aviation	CHILCOTIN	Canada	
	CAD	Chilliwack Aviation	CHILLIWACKAIR	Canada	
	ETN	Chim-Nir Aviation	CHIMNIR	Israel	
CI	CAL	China Airlines	DYNASTY	Taiwan	
CK	CKK	China Cargo Airlines	CARGO KING	China	
MU	CES	China Eastern Airlines	CHINA EASTERN	China	
G5	HXA	China Express Airlines	CHINA EXPRESS	China	
	CFA	China Flying Dragon Aviation	FEILONG	China	
	CTH	China General Aviation Corporation	TONGHANG	China	
	CAG	China National Aviation Corporation	CHINA NATIONAL	China	
CJ	CBF	China Northern Airlines	CHINA NORTHERN	China	Defunct
WH	CNW	China Northwest Airlines	CHINA NORTHWEST	China	Defunct
	CHC	China Ocean Helicopter Corporation	CHINA HELICOPTER	China	
8Y	CYZ	China Postal Airlines	CHINA POST	China	
CZ	CSN	China Southern Airlines	CHINA SOUTHERN	China	
SZ	CXN	China Southwest Airlines	CHINA SOUTHWEST	China	Defunct
KN	CUA	China United Airlines	LIANHANG	China	
XO	CXH	China Xinhua Airlines	XINHUA	China	
3Q	CYH	China Yunnan Airlines	YUNNAN	China	Defunct
	CGU	Chinguetti Airlines	CHINGUETTI	Mauritania	
	CEP	Chipola Aviation	CHIPOLA	United States	
	CPW	Chippewa Air Commuter	CHIPPEWA-AIR	United States	
X7	CHF	Chitaavia	CHITA	Russia	
OQ	CQN	Chongqing Airlines	CHONG QING	China	
	CAS	Christman Air System	CHRISTMAN	United States	
	OEC	Christophorus Flugrettungsverein	CHRISTOPHORUS	Austria	
	CHO	Chrome Air Services	CHROME AIR	United States	
	CHU	Church Aircraft	CHURCHAIR	United States	
A2	CIU	Cielos Airlines	CIELOS	Peru	
QI	CIM	Cimber Sterling	CIMBER	Denmark	
C7	CIN	Cinnamon Air	CINNAMON	Sri Lanka	
	RRU	Cirrus	HELICIRRUS	Chile	Defunct
	NTS	Cirrus Air	NITE STAR	United States	
C9	RUS	Cirrus Airlines	CIRRUS AIR	Germany	Defunct
	JTI	Cirrus Middle East		Lebanon	
	FIV	CitationAir	FIVE STAR	United States	
	XCX	Citibank		United States	
	HZX	Citic General Aviation	ZHONGXIN	China	
	SDR	City Airline	SWEDESTAR	Sweden	
G3	CIX	City Connexion Airlines	CONNEXION	Burundi	Defunct
	XBG	City of Bangor		United States	
WX	BCY	CityJet	CITY-IRELAND	Ireland	
	CAQ	Cityair (Chester) Limited	AIR CHESTER	United Kingdom	
	CII	Cityfly	CITYFLY	Italy	
CJ	CFE	CityFlyer Express	FLYER	United Kingdom	Defunct; ICAO code in use by BA CityFlyer
	CNB	Cityline Hungary	CITYHUN	Hungary	
	HSR	Citylink Airlines	HOOSIER	United States	
	CIW	Civair Airways	CIVFLIGHT	South Africa	
	CAP	Civil Air Patrol	CAP	United States	
CT	CAT	Civil Air Transport	Mandarin	Taiwan	Defunct
	CIA	Civil Aviation Authority	CALIMERA	Slovakia	
	CIV	Civil Aviation Authority of New Zealand	CIVAIR	New Zealand	
	CBA	Civil Aviation Inspectorate of the Czech Republic	CALIBRA	Czech Republic	
	FMC	Claessens International Limited	CLAESSENS	United Kingdom	
	CLK	Clark Aviation	CLARKAIR	United States	
	CSF	Clasair	CALEDONIAN	United Kingdom	
	CLY	Clay Lacy Aviation	CLAY-LACY	United States	
	CGK	Click Airways	CLICK AIR	Kyrgyzstan	
	CLZ	Cloud 9 Air Charters	CLOUDLINE	South Africa	
	CLD	Clowes Estates Limited	CLOWES	United Kingdom	
	SDJ	Club 328	SPACEJET	United Kingdom	
6P	ISG	Club Air	CLUBAIR	Italy	
BX	CST	Coast Air	COAST CENTER	Norway	
DQ		Coastal Air	U.S. Virgin Islands	United States	
	TCL	Coastal Air Transport	TRANS COASTAL	United States	Escape Aviation
	CNG	Coastal Airways	SID-AIR	United States	
	CSV	Coastal Travels	COASTAL TRAVEL	Tanzania	
	CHL	Cohlmia Aviation	COHLMIA	United States	
	OLR	Colaéreos	COLAEREOS	Ecuador	
	CLE	Colemill Enterprises	COLEMILL	United States	
9L	CJC	Colgan Air	COLGAN	United States	
	CAE	Colibri Aviation	HUMMINGBIRD	Canada	
YD	CAT	Cologne Air Transport GmbH		Germany	Defunct since 1996
	CCX	Colt International		United States	
	WCO	Columbia Helicopters	COLUMBIA HELI	United States	
	KLR	Columbus Air Transport	KAY-LER	United States	
	GHP	Colvin Aviation	GRASSHOPPER EX	United States	
OH	COM	Comair	COMAIR	United States	
MN	CAW	Comair	COMMERCIAL	South Africa	
	GCM	Comair Flight Services	GLOBECOM	South Africa	
	CDE	Comed Group	COMEX	United Kingdom	
	CVV	Comeravia	COMERAVIA	Venezuela	
	CRS	Comercial Aérea	COMERCIAL AEREA	Mexico	
	CMG	Comet Airlines	SUNSPY	Nigeria	
	FYN	Comfort Air	FLYNN	Germany	
	CMJ	Comfort Jet Services	COMFORT JET	Togo	
	CLA	Comlux Aviation	COMLUX	Switzerland	
	KAZ	Comlux Kazakhstan	KAZLUX	Kazakhstan	
	MLM	Comlux Malta	LUXMALTA	Malta	
	CXB	Comlux Aruba	STARLUX	Aruba	
	CMH	Commair Aviation	COMMODORE	United Kingdom	
	CTM	Commandement Du Transport Aerien Militaire Francais	COTAM	France	
	CML	Commander Air Charter	COMMANDAIR	Canada	
	CRM	Commander Mexicana	COMMANDERMEX	Mexico	
	CME	Commerce Bank	COMMERCE BANK	United States	(Kansas City) Allocated in 2014
	CMS	Commercial Aviation	ACCESS	Canada	
	GAR	Commodore Aviation		Australia	
	CJS	Commonwealth Jet Service	COMMONWEALTH	United States	
C5	UCA	CommutAir	COMMUTAIR	United States	
KR	CWK	Comores Airlines	CONTICOM	Comoros	
	CGR	Compagnia Generale Ripreseaeree	COMPRIP	Italy	
	CMM	Compagnie Aérienne du Mali	CAMALI	Mali	
	CPM	Compagnie Mauritanienne Des Transports		Mauritania	
	GIC	Compagnie de Bauxites de Guinee	CEBEGE	Guinea	
	AIF	Compañía Aérea de Valencia		Spain	
	ATF	Compañía Aerotécnicas Fotográficas	AEROTECNICAS	Spain	
	LCT	Compañía De Actividades Y Servicios De Aviación	STELLAIR	Spain	
	EJV	Compania Ejecutiva	EJECUTIVA	Mexico	
	HSE	Compania Helicopteros Del Sureste	HELISURESTE	Spain	
	MDR	Compania Mexicana De Aeroplanos	AEROPLANOS	Mexico	
	HSS	Compañía Transportes Aéreos Del Sur	TAS HELICOPTEROS	Spain	
	TAV	Compañía de Servicios Aéreos Tavisa	TAVISA	Spain	
	CYF	Company Flight	COMPANY FLIGHT	Denmark	
CP	CPZ	Compass Airlines	COMPASS ROSE	United States	
	CPS	Compass International Airways	COMPASS	United Kingdom	
	XCO	Compuflight Operations Service		United States	
	XCS	Compuserve Incorporated		United States	
	CRC	Conair Aviation	CONAIR-CANADA	Canada	
	COD	Concordavia	CONCORDAVIA	Ukraine	
	CNR	Condor Aero Services	CONAERO	United States	
	CIB	Condor	CONDOR BERLIN	Germany	
DE	CFG	Condor Flugdienst	CONDOR	Germany	
	COF	Confort Air	CONFORT	Canada	
	CAK	Congo Air		Bahamas	
	CGA	Congressional Air	CONGRESSIONAL	United States	
	ROY	Conifair Aviation		Canada	
	CCT	Connect Air	CONNECT	Canada	Allocated in 2014
	BSN	Connectair Charters	BASTION	Canada	
	CAC	Conquest Airlines	CONQUEST AIR	United States	
	CXO	Conroe Aviation Services	CONROE AIR	United States	
	VCH	Consorcio Helitec	CONSORCIO HELITEC	Venezuela	
	UZA	Constanta Airline	CONSTANTA	Ukraine	
	KIS	Contactair	CONTACTAIR	Germany	
	XCL	Contel ASC		United States	
CO	COA	Continental Airlines	CONTINENTAL	United States	ICAO Code and callsign withdrawn, merged with United Airlines
CO		Continental Express	JETLINK	United States	
CS	CMI	Continental Micronesia	AIR MIKE	United States	
	CON	Continental Oil	CONOCO	United States	
CS	CS	Cambrian Airways	Cambrian	United Kingdom	Defunct 1974
V0	VCV	Conviasa	CONVIASA	Venezuela	
	CKA	Cook Inlet Aviation	COOK-AIR	United States	
	SVY	Cooper Aerial Surveys	SURVEYOR	United Kingdom	
CM	CMP	Copa Airlines	COPA	Panama	
	CAT	Copenhagen Air Taxi	AIRCAT	Denmark	
	COP	Copper State Air Service	COPPER STATE	United States	
	AAQ	Copterline	COPTERLINE	Finland	Former name: Copter Action; former callsign: COPTER ACTION
CQ	CCW	Central Charter	CENTRAL CHARTER	Czech Republic	
XC	CAI	Corendon Airlines	CORENDON	Turkey	Turistik Hava Tasimacilik
CD	CND	Corendon Dutch Airlines	DUTCH CORENDON	Netherlands	
XR	CXI	Corendon Airlines Europe	TOURISTIC	Malta	Touristic Aviation
	CRA	Coronado Aerolíneas	CORAL	Colombia	
	CPB	Corpac Canada	PENTA	Canada	
	CNC	Corporación Aéreo Cencor	CENCOR	Mexico	
	CPG	Corporacion Aeroangeles	CORPORANG	Mexico	
	CGY	Corporacion Paraguaya De Aeronautica		Paraguay	
	CPT	Corporate Air	AIR SPUR	United States	
	CPR	Corporate Air	CORPAIR	United States	
	CPO	Corporate Aircraft Company	MOKAN	United States	
	COO	Corporate Airlink	CORPORATE	Canada	
	CKE	Corporate Aviation Services	CHECKMATE	United States	
	VHT	Corporate Flight International	VEGAS HEAT	United States	
LF	VTE	Contour Airlines	VOLUNTEER	United States	
	CJI	Corporate Jets	SEA JET	United States	
SS	CRL	Corsairfly	CORSAIR	France	
XK	CCM	Corse Méditerranée	CORSICA	France	Name changed to Air Corsica
F5	COZ	Cosmic Air	COSMIC AIR	Nepal	
	COT	Costa Airlines	COAIR	Venezuela	Defunct
GW	CRG	Costa Rica Green Airways		Costa Rica	
	CHI	Cougar Helicopters	COUGAR	Canada	
	MGB	Coulson Flying Service	MOCKINGBIRD	United Kingdom	
	NSW	Country Connection Airlines		Australia	
	CIK	Country International Airlines	COUNTRY AIR	Kyrgyzstan	Defunct
	CSD	Courier Services	DELIVERY	United States	
	CUT	Court Helicopters	COURT AIR	South Africa	
	OU	Court Line	COURTLINE	United Kingdom	Defunct
	CVL	Coval Air	COVAL	Canada	
	COW	COWI	COWI	Denmark	
7C	COY	Coyne Aviation	COYNE AIR	United Kingdom	
	CFD	Cranfield University	AERONAUT	United Kingdom	
	CRE	Cree Airways	CREE AIR	Canada	
	ELM	Crelam	CRELAM	Mexico	
	CAN	Crest Aviation	CREST	United Kingdom	
	KRM	Crimea Universal Avia	TRANS UNIVERSAL	Ukraine	
OU	CTN	Croatia Airlines	CROATIA	Croatia	
	HRZ	Croatian Air Force	CROATIAN AIRFORCE	Croatia	
	CRX	Cross Aviation	CROSSAIR	United Kingdom	
QE	ECC	Crossair Europe	Cigogne	Switzerland	
	CWX	Crow Executive Air	CROW EXPRESS	United States	
	CKR	Crown Air Systems	CROWN AIR	United States	
	CRO	Crown Airways	CROWN AIRWAYS	United States	
	CRW	Crownair	REGAL	Canada	
	VCR	Cruiser Linhas Aéreas	VOE CRUISER	Brazil	
	CTY	Cryderman Air Service	CENTURY	United States	
	CYT	Crystal Shamrock Airlines	CRYSTAL-AIR	United States	
	IRO	CSA Air	IRON AIR	United States	
CU	CUB	Cubana de Aviación	CUBANA	Cuba	
	CTF	Cutter Aviation	CUTTER FLIGHT	United States	
	CBL	Cumberland Airways (Nicholson Air Service)	CUMBERLAND	United States	
	CTT	Custom Air Transport	CATT	United States	
	RGN	Cygnus Air	CYGNUS AIR	Spain	
	CYC	Cyprair Tours	CYPRAIR	Cyprus	
	CYS	Cypress Airlines	SKYBIRD	Canada	
CY	CYP	Cyprus Airways	CYPRUS	Cyprus	
YK	KYV	Cyprus Turkish Airlines	AIRKIBRIS	Turkey	Ceased operations 2010
	CEF	Czech Air Force	CZECH AIR FORCE	Czech Republic	
	AHD	Czech Air Handling	AIRHANDLING	Czech Republic	
OK	CSA	Czech Airlines	CSA-LINES	Czech Republic	
	CIE	Czech Government Flying Service	CZECH REPUBLIC	Czech Republic	
8L	CGP	Cargo Plus Aviation		United Arab Emirates	
	HNL	CHC Helicopters Netherlands	MAPLELEAF	Netherlands	
5Z	KEM	CemAir	CEMAIR	South Africa	
	JLH	Centro de Servicio Aeronautico	CESA	Mexico	
	FCB	Cobalt	NEW AGE	Cyprus	
	CVK	CAVOK Airlines	CARGO LINE	Ukraine	
XG	CLI	Clickair	CLICKJET	Spain	Merge into Vueling
PN	CHB	West Air (China)	WEST CHINA	China	
	CRN	Carson Air Ltd	CARSON	Canada	Air ambulance operator
	DJT	Dreamjet	DREAMJET	France	2014
	DPJ	Delta Private Jets	JET CARD	United States	Changed from ELJ/ELITE JET in 2014
	DJR	Desert Jet	DESERT FLIGHT	United States	
	DLA	Air Dolomiti	DOLOMITI	Italy	
	DLC	Dehong South Asian General Aviation	SOARCOPTER	China	Was Ruili Jingcheng Helicopters
DL	DLH	Deutsche Luft Hansa	DEUTSCHE LUFT HANSA	Germany	Became Lufthansa
	DNS	Dniproaviaservis Company		Ukraine	
	DRF	Dream Flyers Training Center		Spain	
	DMF	DMCFLY	DEMLY	Mexico	
	NAU	Danaus Lineas Aereas	DANAUS	Mexico	
	GDF	DF Aviation		Ukraine	
	DDA	D & D Aviation	DUSTY	United States	
	DNK	D&K Aviation	DIRECT JET	United States	
V5	VPA	DanubeWings	VIP TAXI	Slovakia	Former names VIP Air and VIP Wings
	DHE	DAP Helicopteros	HELIDAP	Chile	
	VLF	DFS UK Limited	VOLANTE	United Kingdom	
WD	DSR	DAS Air Cargo	DAIRAIR	Uganda	
	RKC	DAS Airlines	DAS CONGO	Democratic Republic of the Congo	
DX	DTR	DAT Danish Air Transport	DANISH	Denmark	
	ENT	DAT Enterprise Limited	DATENT	United Kingdom	defunct
	BDN	DERA Boscombe Down	GAUNTLET	United Kingdom	
	DSN	DESNA	DESNA	Ukraine	
	DET	DETA Air	SAMAL	Kazakhstan	
	DGO	DGO Jet	DGO JET	Mexico	
	DAE	DHL Aero Expreso	YELLOW	Panama	
D0	DHK	DHL Air Limited	WORLD EXPRESS	United Kingdom	DHL Air UK
	DHV	DHL Aviation	WORLDSTAR	South Africa	
ES	DHX	DHL International	DILMUN	Bahrain	
L3	JOS	DHL de Guatemala		Guatemala	
	RSK	DSWA	REDSKIN	United States	
D3	DAO	Daallo Airlines	DALO AIRLINES	Djibouti	
N2	DAG	Dagestan Airlines	DAGAL	Russia	
	DHA	Dahla Airlines		Democratic Republic of Congo	
CA	CCD	Dalian Airlines	XIANGJIAN	China	
	DCS	DC Aviation	TWIN STAR	Germany	
	DCX	Daimler-Chrysler	DAIMLER	United States	
	DKA	Daka		Kazakhstan	
	DLR	Dala Air Services	DALA AIR	Nigeria	
H8	KHB	Dalavia	DALAVIA	Russia	
	DXP	Dallas Express Airlines	DALLAS EXPRESS	United States	
	DAS	Damascene Airways	AIRDAM	Syrian Arab Republic	
	DSA	Danbury Airways	DANBURY AIRWAYS	United States	
	DOP	Dancopter	DANCOPTER	Denmark	
	DAF	Danish Air Force	DANISH AIRFORCE	Denmark	
DD	DDL	Danish Air Lines		Denmark	defunct
	DAR	Danish Army	DANISH ARMY	Denmark	
	DNY	Danish Navy	DANISH NAVY	Denmark	
	DNU	Danu Oro Transportas	DANU	Lithuania	
	DRT	Darta	DARTA	France	
0D	DWT	Darwin Airline	DARWIN	Switzerland	
	DSQ	Dasab Airlines	DASAB AIR	Uganda	
	DSH	Dash Air Charter	DASH CHARTER	United States	
	GOB	Dash Aviation	PILGRIM	United Kingdom	
	DGX	Dasnair	DASNA	Switzerland	
	DAB	Dassault Aviation		France	
	CVF	Dassault Falcon Jet Corporation	CLOVERLEAF	United States	
	DSO	Dassault Falcon Service	DASSAULT	France	
	DTN	Data International	DATA AIR	Sudan	
	XDT	Date Transformation Corp		United States	
D5	DAU	Dauair	DAUAIR	Germany	
	DCO	David Crawshaw Consultants Limited		United Kingdom	
	DWN	Dawn Air	DAWN AIR	United States	
	DJS	DayJet	DAYJET	United States	
	DAY	Daya Aviation	DAYA	Sri Lanka	
	DHC	De Havilland	DEHAVILLAND	Canada	
	IAY	Deadalos Flugtbetriebs	IASON	Austria	
	DAA	Decatur Aviation	DECUR	United States	
	DKN	Deccan Charters	DECCAN	India	
	JDC	Deere & Company	JOHN DEERE	United States	
	DWR	Delaware Skyways	DELAWARE	United States	
	DEA	Delta Aerotaxi	JET SERVICE	Italy	
	SNO	Delta Air Charter	SNOWBALL	Canada	
	ELJ	Delta Private Jets	ELITE JET	United States	Changed to DPJ/JET CARD in 2014
DL	DAL	Delta Air Lines	DELTA	United States	
	KMB	Delta Engineering Aviation	KEMBLEJET	United Kingdom	
	DLI	Delta Express International	DELTA EXPRESS	Ukraine	
	DSU	Delta State University	DELTA STATE	United States	
J7	DNM	Denim Air	DENIM	Netherlands	Defunct
	FEC	Denver Express	FALCON EXPRESS	United States	
	DJT	Denver Jet	DENVER JET	United States	
	FGC	Departament d'Agricultura de la Generalitat de Catalunya	FORESTALS	Spain	
	DRY	Deraya Air Taxi	DERAYA	Indonesia	
	DRX	Des R Cargo Express		Mauritania	
	MIZ	Desarrollo Milaz	MILAZ	Mexico	
	DTY	Destiny Air Services	DESTINY	Sierra Leone	
2A		Deutsche Bahn		Germany	
1I	AMB	Deutsche Rettungsflugwacht	CIVIL AIR AMBULANCE	Germany	
	LFO	Deutsches Zentrum fur Luft-und Raumfahrt EV	LUFO	Germany	
	DIS	Di Air	DI AIR	Serbia	
	SPK	Diamond Aviation	SPARKLE	United States	
	DRB	Didier Rousset Buy	DIDIER	Chile	
	DGT	Digital Equipment Corporation	DIGITAL	United States	
	DIP	Diplomatic Freight Services	DIPFREIGHT	United Kingdom	
	ENA	Dirección General de Aviación Civil y Telecomunicasciones	ENA	Spain	
	DIA	Direct Air	BLUE SKY	United States	
	XAP	Direct Air trading as Midway Connection	MID-TOWN	United States	
	DCT	Direct Flight		United Kingdom	
	SXP	Direct Fly	EXPRESS SKY	Poland	defunct
AW	DIR	Dirgantara Air Service	DIRGANTARA	Indonesia	
	DCV	Discover Air	DISCOVER	United States	
4Y	OCN	Discover Airlines	OCEAN	Germany	Formerly branded Eurowings Discover
DH	DVA	Discovery Airways	DISCOVERY AIRWAYS	United States	
	XDS	Dispatch Services		United States	
	DIX	Dix Aviation	DIX FLIGHT	Germany	
	DEE	Dixie Airways	TACAIR	United States	
Z6	UDN	Dniproavia	DNIEPRO	Ukraine	
	FDN	Dolphin Air	FLYING DOLPHIN	United Arab Emirates	
	IXX	Dolphin Express Airlines	ISLAND EXPRESS	United States	
	DPL	Dome Petroleum	DOME	Canada	
YU	ADM	Dominair	DOMINAIR	Dominican Republic	defunct; former IATA code: SS; former name: Aerolíneas Dominicanas, ICAO code no longer allocated
	MYO	Dominguez Toledo (Grupo Mayoral)	MAYORAL	Spain	
DO	DOA	Dominicana de Aviación	DOMINICANA	Dominican Republic	defunct
E3	DMO	Domodedovo Airlines	DOMODEDOVO	Russia	defunct
	DVB	Don Avia	DONSEBAI	Kazakhstan	
	DON	Donair Flying Club	DONAIR	United Kingdom	
D9	DNV	Donavia	DONAVIA	Russia	formerly Aeroflot-Don
5D	UDC	DonbassAero	DONBASS AERO	Ukraine	
DZ	EPA	Donghai Airlines	DONGHAI AIR	China	
	DAD	Dorado Air	DORADO AIR	Dominican Republic	
	DOR	Dornier	DORNIER	Germany	
	DAV	Dornier Aviation Nigeria	DANA AIR	Nigeria	
	DOM	Dos Mundos	DOS MUNDOS	Dominican Republic	
	DCA	Dreamcatcher Airways	DREAM CATCHER	United Kingdom	
KB	DRK	Druk Air	ROYAL BHUTAN	Bhutan	
	DRE	Drummond Island Air	MICHIGAN	United States	
	DUB	Dubai Airwing	DUBAI	United Arab Emirates	
	DBK	Dubrovnik Air	SEAGULL	Croatia	
	DUK	Ducair	LION KING	Luxembourg	
	DBJ	Duchess of Brittany (Jersey) Limited	DUCHESS	United Kingdom	
	LPD	UK Royal/HRH Duke of York	LEOPARD	United Kingdom	
	DUN	Dun'Air	DUNAIR	Mauritania	
	PHD	Duncan Aviation	PANHANDLE	United States	
	VVF	Dunyaya Bakis Hava Tasimaciligi	WORLDFOCUS	Turkey	
	DUO	Duo Airways	FLY DUO	United Kingdom	
	DJE	Durango Jet	DURANGO JET	Mexico	
	DNL	Dutch Antilles Express	DUTCH ANTILLES	Netherlands Antilles	
	DCE	Dutch Caribbean Express	DUTCH CARIBBEAN	Netherlands Antilles	
	DBR	Dutchbird	DUTCHBIRD	Netherlands	ICAO code allocated to another company, call sign no longer allocated
	DBR	Dobrolet	DOBROLET	Russia	Defunct, ICAO code still allocated (2017)
	DFS	Dwyer Aircraft Services	DWYAIR	United States	
	XDY	Dynair Services		United States	
	DNR	Dynamair Aviation	DYNAMAIR	Canada	
	DYE	Dynamic Air	DYNAMIC	Netherlands	ICAO code and call sign no longer allocated
	DYA	Dynamic Airways	DYNAMIC AIR	United States	
DI	BAG	Dba	SPEEDWAY	Germany	Merged into Air Berlin
HO	DKH	Juneyao Air	AIR JUNEYAO	China	
	EAV	Eagle Airlines Luftverkehrsges	MAYFLOWER	Austria	
	ABU	Eagle Aviation Services		United States	
	ISL	Eastland Air Services (Flugfélag Austurlands)	EASTLAND	Iceland	2022
	EBF	Echo Airlines		Bahamas	2014
MQ	ENY	Envoy Air	ENVOY	United States	2014
	ENK	Executive Airlink	SUNBIRD	United States	Allocated in 2014
EL	ELB	Ellinair	ELLINAIR HELLAS	Greece	
	ELN	Eleron Aviation Company	ELERON	Ukraine	
	ECC	Eclair Aviation	ECLAIR	Czech Republic	
	ELU	Egyptian Leisure Airlines	EGYPTIAN LEISURE	Egypt	
9E	EDV	Endeavor Air	ENDEAVOR	United States	
	MNU	Elite Airways	MAINER	United States	
		Europe Jet	EUROPE JET	Turkey	
E1		Everbread		United Kingdom	
	EHD	E H Darby Aviation	PLATINUM AIR	United States	
1C		Electronic Data Systems		Switzerland	
1Y		Electronic Data Systems		United States	
	EXW	Executive Airlines Services	ECHOLINE	Nigeria	
	EFS	EFAOS- Agencia De Viagens e Turismo	EFAOS	Angola	
	EFD	Eisele Flugdienst	EVER FLIGHT	Germany	
	FSD	EFS-Flugservice	FLUGSERVICE	Germany	
	EIS	EIS Aircraft	COOL	Germany	
	IAG	EPAG	EPAG	France	
	ESI	ESI Eliservizi Italiani	ELISERVIZI	Italy	
	EUY	EU Airways	EUROAIRWAYS	Ireland	
VE	EUJ	EUjet	UNION JET	Ireland	defunct
	ICR	Eagle Aero	ICARUS FLIGHTS	United States	
	FEI	Eagle Air	ARCTIC EAGLE	Iceland	
		Eagle Air		Indonesia	
	EGR	Eagle Air	EAGLE SIERRA	Sierra Leone	
	EFL	Eagle Air	FLYING EAGLE	Tanzania	defunct 2002
H7	EGU	Eagle Air	AFRICAN EAGLE	Uganda	
NZ	EAG	Eagle Airways	EAGLE	New Zealand	
	EGX	Eagle Air Company	THAI EAGLE	Thailand	
	GYP	Eagle Aviation	GYPSY	United Kingdom	
	EGN	Eagle Aviation France	FRENCH EAGLE	France	
	EES	Eagle Express		Serbia	2014
9A	EZX	Eagle Express Air Charter	EAGLEXPRESS	Malaysia	
	SEG	Eagle International	SEN-EAGLE	Senegal	
	EGJ	Eagle Jet Charter	EAGLE JET	United States	
	EMD	Eaglemed (Ballard Aviation)	EAGLEMED	United States	
	ERX	Earth Airlines Services	EARTH AIR	Nigeria	
S9	HSA	East African Safari Air	DUMA	Kenya	
	EXZ	East African Safari Air Express	TWIGA	Kenya	
E3	EMU	East Asia Airlines	EAST ASIA	Macao	
	ECT	East Coast Airways	EASTWAY	South Africa	
	ECJ	East Coast Jets	EASTCOAST JET	United States	
	EHA	East Hampton Aire	AIRE HAMPTON	United States	
	EKC	East Kansas City Aviation	BLUE GOOSE	United States	
	CTK	East Midlands Helicopters	COSTOCK	United Kingdom	
	DXH	East Star Airlines	EAST STAR	China	
	EWA	East-West Airlines	EASTWEST	Australia	defunct
ZE	ESR	Eastar Jet	EASTAR	South Korea	
	EAZ	Eastern Air	EASAIR	Zambia	
	EAX	Eastern Air Executive	EASTEX	United Kingdom	
EA	EAL	Eastern Air Lines	EASTERN	United States	defunct
	EAL	Eastern Air Lines	EASTERN	United States	2015
T3	EZE	Eastern Airways	EASTFLIGHT	United Kingdom	
QF	EAQ	Eastern Australia Airlines	EASTERN	Australia	IATA dupe with parent QANTAS. Also uses 2 letter ICAO EA.
	ECI	Eastern Carolina Aviation	EASTERN CAROLINA	United States	
	GNS	Eastern Executive Air Charter	GENESIS	United Kingdom	
	LIS	Eastern Express	LARISA	Kazakhstan	
	EME	Eastern Metro Express	EMAIR	United States	
	EPB	Eastern Pacific Aviation	EAST PAC	Canada	
	ESJ	Eastern SkyJets	EASTERN SKYJETS	United Arab Emirates	
DK	ELA	Eastland Air		Australia	
W9	SGR	Eastwind Airlines	STINGER	United States	defunct
	FYE	Easy Link Aviation Services	FLYME	Nigeria	
EC	EJU	easyJet Europe	ALPINE	Austria	
DS	EZS	easyJet Switzerland	TOPSWISS	Switzerland	
U2	EZY	easyJet UK	EASY	United Kingdom	
	CMN	Eckles Aircraft	CIMMARON AIRE	United States	
	EJT	Eclipse Aviation	ECLIPSE JET	United States	
	ECQ	Eco Air	SKYBRIDGE	Nigeria	
	DEI	Ecoair		Algeria	
	NAK	École Nationale de l'Aviation Civile	ENAC SCHOOL	France	Formerly SFA prior to SEFA ATO being absorbed by the École Nationale de l'Aviation Civile.
	ECX	Ecomex Air Cargo	AIR ECOMEX	Angola	
	ECD	Ecotour	ECOTOUR	Mexico	
	XCC	Ecoturistica de Xcalak	XCALAK	Mexico	
	ECV	Ecuatoguineana De Aviación (EGA)	EQUATOGUINEA	Equatorial Guinea	
	EQC	Ecuatorial Cargo	ECUA-CARGO	Equatorial Guinea	
	ECU	Ecuavia	ECUAVIA	Ecuador	
WK	EDW	Edelweiss Air	EDELWEISS	Switzerland	
	SLO	Edgartown Air	SLOW	United States	
	EDC	Air Charter Scotland	SALTIRE	United Kingdom	Previously: Edinburgh Air Charter
	EDJ	Edwards Jet Center of Montana	EDWARDS	United States	
	EIJ	Efata Papua Airlines	EFATA	Indonesia	
	EUW	EFS European Flight Service	EUROWEST	Sweden	
MS	MSR	Egyptair	EGYPTAIR	Egypt	
	MSX	Egyptair Cargo	EGYPTAIR CARGO	Egypt	
	EGY	Egyptian Air Force		Egypt	
	EJX	Egyptian Aviation		Egypt	
	EMA	Egyptian Aviation Company		Egypt	
	EIX	Ei Air Exports	AIR EXPORTS	Ireland	
	EIR	Eirjet	EIRJET	Ireland	
LY	ELY	El Al Israel Airlines	ELAL	Israel	
	CMX	El Caminante Taxi Aéreo	EL CAMINANTE	Mexico	
	GLQ	El Quilada International Aviation	QUILADA	Sudan	
	ELS	El Sal Air	EL SAL	El Salvador	
	ESC	El Sol De América	SOLAMERICA	Venezuela	
UZ	BRQ	El-Buraq Air Transport	BURAQAIR	Libya	
	ELX	Elan Express	ELAN	United States	
	LBR	Elbe Air Transport	MOTION	Germany	
	NLK	Elbrus-Avia Air Enterprise	ELAVIA	Russia	
	DND	Eldinder Aviation	DINDER	Sudan	
	PDV	Elicar	ELICAR	Italy	
	EDO	Elidolomiti	ELIDOLOMITI	Italy	
	ELB	Elieuro	ELILOBARDIA	Italy	No longer used
	EFG	Elifriulia	ELIFRIULIA	Italy	
	ELH	Elilario Italia	LARIO	Italy	
	EOA	Elilombarda	LOMBARDA	Italy	
	MEE	Elimediterranea	ELIMEDITERRANEA	Italy	
	VUL	Elios	ELIOS	Italy	
	IEP	Elipiu'	ELIPIU	Italy	
	RSA	Elisra Airlines	ESRA	Sudan	
	EAI	Elite Air	ELAIR	Togo	
	EJD	Elite Jets	ELITE DUBAI	United Arab Emirates	
	FGS	Elitellina	ELITELLINA	Italy	
	ELT	Elliott Aviation	ELLIOT	United States	
	MGG	Elmagal Aviation Services	ELMAGAL	Sudan	
	ELR	Elrom Aviation and Investments		Israel	
	EAM	Embassy Airlines	EMBASSY AIR	Nigeria	
	EFT	Embassy Freight Company	EMBASSY FREIGHT	United States	
	EMB	Empresa Brasileira De Aeronáutica	EMBRAER	Brazil	
	XSL	Embry-Riddle Aeronautical University	SATSLAB	United States	Sesatlab Proof-of-Concept Flight
	ERU	Embry-Riddle Aeronautical University	RIDDLE	United States	
EA	EAI	Emerald Airlines	GEMSTONE	Ireland	
	JEM	Emerald Airways	GEMSTONE	United Kingdom	
	EWW	Emery Worldwide Airlines	EMERY	United States	
	EMT	Emetebe	EMETEBE	Ecuador	
EK	UAE	Emirates	EMIRATES	United Arab Emirates	
	SBC	Emoyeni Air Charter	SABIAN AIR	South Africa	Mount Air
	EMP	Empire Air Service	EMPIRE	United States	
EM	CFS	Empire Airlines	EMPIRE AIR	United States	
	MPR	Empire Aviation Services		Nigeria	
	ETP	Empire Test Pilots' School	TESTER	United Kingdom	
	AUO	Empresa (Aero Uruguay), S.A.	UNIFORM OSCAR	Uruguay	
	PRG	Empresa Aero-Servicios Parrague	ASPAR	Chile	
	VNA	Empresa Aviación Interamericana	EBBA	Uruguay	
EU	EEA	Empresa Ecuatoriana De Aviación	ECUATORIANA	Ecuador	
	CNI	Empresa Nacional De Servicios Aéreos	SERAER	Cuba	
	VNE	Empresa Venezolana	VENEZOLANA	Venezuela	
	GTV	Empresa de Aviación Aerogaviota	GAVIOTA	Cuba	
	XLT	Empressa Brasileira de Infra-Estrutura Aeroportuaria-Infraero	INFRAERO	Brazil	
	ENC	Endecots	ENDECOTS	Ecuador	
	ENI	Enimex	ENIMEX	Estonia	
G8	ENK	Enkor JSC	ENKOR	Russia	
	EGV	Enrique Gleisner Vivanco	GLEISNER	Chile	
	ESE	Ensenada Vuelos Especiales	ENSENADA ESPECIAL	Mexico	
E4	ENT	Enter Air	ENTER	Poland	
	ENS	Entergy Services	ENTERGY SHUTTLE	United States	
	EWS	Enterprise World Airways	WORLD ENTERPRISE	Democratic Republic of the Congo	
E0	ESS	Eos Airlines	NEW DAWN	United States	
	EKA	Equaflight Service	EQUAFLIGHT	Republic of the Congo	
	EQZ	Equatair Air Services (Zambia)	ZAMBIA CARGO	Zambia	
	EQT	Equatorial Airlines		Equatorial Guinea	
EJ	EQR	Equatorial Congo Airlines	ECAIR	Republic of the Congo	2024
	ERH	Era Helicopters	ERAH	United States	
	IRY	Eram Air	ERAM AIR	Iran	
	ERF	Erfoto	ERFOTO	Portugal	
	ERE	Erie Airways	AIR ERIE	United States	
B8	ERT	Eritrean Airlines	ERITREAN	Eritrea	
	EAD	Escola De Aviacao Aerocondor	AERO-ESCOLA	Portugal	
	CTV	Escuela De Pilotos Are Aviación	ARE AVIACION	Spain	
	EPC	Espace Aviation Services	ESPACE	Democratic Republic of the Congo	
	ERC	Esso Resources Canada	ESSO	Canada	
E7	ESF	Estafeta Carga Aérea		Mexico	
	EEF	Estonian Air Force	ESTONIAN AIR FORCE	Estonia	
OV	ELL	Estonian Air	ESTONIAN	Estonia	
	ETA	Estrellas Del Aire	ESTRELLAS	Mexico	
ET	ETH	Ethiopian Airlines	ETHIOPIAN	Ethiopia	
	MJM	Eti 2000	ELCO ETI	Italy	
EY	ETD	Etihad Airways	ETIHAD	United Arab Emirates	
	ETM	Etram Air Wing	ETRAM	Angola	
	EVN	Euraviation	EURAVIATION	Italy	
	ECN	Euro Continental AIE	EURO CONTINENTAL	Spain	
RZ		Euro Exec Express		Sweden	
	ESN	Euro Sun	EURO SUN	Turkey	
	EAK	Euro-Asia Air	EAKAZ	Kazakhstan	
	KZE	Euro-Asia Air International	KAZEUR	Kazakhstan	
MM	MMZ	EuroAtlantic Airways	EUROATLANTIC	Portugal	
M9	SEB	Euroavia Airlines	EURO AVIA	Cyprus	Founded 2024
	GOJ	EuroJet Aviation	GOJET	United Kingdom	
	EUP	Pan Europeenne Air Service	SAVOY	France	
	EUU	Euroamerican Air	EUROAMERICAN	Uruguay	
	ECY	Euroceltic Airways	ECHELON	United Kingdom	
	EUC	Eurocontrol		Belgium	
	ECF	Eurocopter	EUROCOPTER	France	
UI	ECA	Eurocypria Airlines	EUROCYPRIA	Cyprus	
GJ	EEZ	Eurofly	E-FLY	Italy	
	EEU	Eurofly Service	EUROFLY	Italy	
	EUG	Euroguineana de Aviación	EUROGUINEA	Equatorial Guinea	
	ERJ	Eurojet Italia	JET ITALIA	Italy	
	JLN	Eurojet Limited	JET LINE	Malta	
	RDP	Eurojet Romania	JET-ARROW	Romania	
	EJS	Eurojet Servis	EEJAY SERVICE	Czech Republic	
K2	ELO	Eurolot	EUROLOT	Poland	
3W	EMX	Euromanx Airways	EUROMANX	Austria	
	GED	Europe Air Lines	LANGUEDOC	France	
5O	FPO	Europe Airpost	FRENCH POST	France	
	EUT	European 2000 Airlines	FIESTA	Malta	
	EAG	European Aeronautical Group UK		United Kingdom	defunct
EA	EAL	European Air Express	STAR WING	Germany	
QY	BCS	European Air Transport	POSTMAN	Belgium	
E7	EAF	European Aviation Air Charter	EUROCHARTER	United Kingdom	
	EBJ	European Business Jets		United Kingdom	
	ECB	European Coastal Airlines	COASTAL CLIPPER	Croatia	
	ETV	European Executive	EURO EXEC	United Kingdom	
	EXC	European Executive Express	ECHO EXPRESS	Sweden	
	EBG	Eurosense	EUROSENSE	Bulgaria	
	ESX	Euroskylink	CATFISH	United Kingdom	
EW	EWG	Eurowings	EUROWINGS	Germany	
E6	EWL	Eurowings Europe	Black Pearl	Malta	
BR	EVA	EVA Air	EVA	Taiwan	
	EVE	Evelop Airlines	EVELOP	Spain	
	EVK	Everett Aviation	EVERETT	Kenya	
	EVT	Everett Limited		Tanzania	
EZ	EIA	Evergreen International Airlines	EVERGREEN	United States	
	VTS	Everts Air Alaska/Everts Air Cargo	EVERTS	United States	
	EVL	Evolem Aviation	EVOLEM	France	
ZD	EWR	Ewa Air	MAYOTTE AIR	France	
	EMN	Examiner Training Agency	AGENCY	United Kingdom	
JN	XLA	Excel Airways	EXPO	United Kingdom	
	XEL	Excel Charter	HELI EXCEL	United Kingdom	
	GZA	Excellent Air	EXCELLENT AIR	Germany	
MB	EXA	Execair Aviation	CANADIAN EXECAIRE	Canada	
	VCN	Execujet Charter	AVCON	Switzerland	
	EJO	Execujet Middle East	MIDJET	United Arab Emirates	
	VMP	Execujet Scandinavia	VAMPIRE	Denmark	
	LFL	Executive Air	LIFE FLIGHT	Zimbabwe	
	EAC	Executive Air Charter	EXECAIR	United States	
	XAF	Executive Air Fleet		United States	
	ECS	Executive Aircraft Charter and Charter Services	ECHO	Ireland	
	XAH	Executive Aircraft Services		United Kingdom	
OW	EXK	Executive Airlines	EXECUTIVE EAGLE	United States	American Eagle
	EXU	Executive Airlines	SACAIR	Spain	
	JTR	Executive Aviation Services	JESTER	United Kingdom	
	EXE	Executive Flight	EXEC	United States	
	TRI	Executive Flight Operations Ontario Government	TRILLIUM	Canada	
	EXJ	Executive Jet Charter		United Kingdom	
	EJM	Executive Jet Management	JET SPEED	United States	
	TEA	Executive Turbine Aviation	TRAVELMAX	South Africa	
	EXF	Eximflight	EXIMFLIGHT	Mexico	
	EXN	Exin	EXIN	Poland	
	EXR	Expertos En Carga	EXPERTOS ENCARGA	Mexico	
	FXA	Express Air	EFFEX	United States	
	EIC	Express International Cargo	EXCARGO	São Tomé and Príncipe	
	XPL	Express Line Aircompany	EXPRESSLINE	United States	
	XNA	Express Net Airlines	EXPRESSNET	United States	
EO	LHN	Express One International	LONGHORN	United States	defunct
	XTO	Express Tours	EXPRESS TOURS	Canada	
EV	ASQ	ExpressJet	ACEY	United States	
	XSL	Excel-Aire Service	EXCELAIRE	United States	
	LTD	Executive Express Aviation/JA Air Charter	LIGHT SPEED	United States	
	XSR	Executive Flight Services	AIRSHARE	United States	
	EPR	Express Airways	EMPEROR	Slovenia	
	XRO	ExxAero	CRAMER	Netherlands	
	JTM	Exxavia Limited	SKYMAN	Ireland	
	EZJ	Ezjet GT	GUYANA JET	Guyana	
8K	EVS	Exploits Valley Air Services	EVAS	Canada	
	FRX	Fort Aero	FORT AERO	Estonia	
	PBR	Fast Air	POLAR BEAR	Canada	
	SRE	Fly Jetstream Aviation	STREAMJET	South Africa	
	FTZ	Fastjet	GREY BIRD	Tanzania	
	FAP	F Air	FAIR SCHOOL	Czech Republic	
	FFL	ForeFlight	FOREFLIGHT	United States	3rd party Privacy ICAO Address (PIA) callsign used to obscure true airplane registrations
	EYE	F.S. Air Service	SOCKEYE	United States	
	IFA	FAI Air Service	RED ANGEL	Germany	
	FLC	FINFO Flight Inspection Aircraft	FLIGHT CHECK	United States	
	FKI	FLM Aviation Mohrdieck	KIEL AIR	Germany	
	DCM	FLTPLAN (anonymized service)	DOT COM	United States	3rd party Privacy ICAO Address (PIA) callsign used to obscure true airplane registrations
	FLW	FLowair Aviation	QUICKFLOW	France	
	FMG	FMG Verkehrsfliegerschule Flughafen Paderborn-Lippstadt	HUSKY	Germany	
	FRA	FR Aviation	RUSHTON	United Kingdom	
	FSB	FSB Flugservice & Development	SEABIRD	Germany	
	LEJ	FSH Luftfahrtunternehmen	LEIPZIG FAIR	Germany	
	FBA	Fab Air	FAB AIR	Kyrgyzstan	
	FCS	Facts Air	MEXFACTS	Mexico	
	FAV	Fair Aviation	FAIRAVIA	South Africa	
	FWD	Fair Wind Air Charter	FAIR WIND	United Arab Emirates	
	FLS	Fairlines	FAIRLINE	Netherlands	Defunct
	FFC	Fairoaks Flight Centre	FAIROAKS	United Kingdom	
	FWY	Fairways Corporation	FAIRWAYS	United States	
	FCN	Falcon Air	FALCON	Sweden	
	FAR	Falcon Air	FALCAIR	Slovenia	
	FAO	Falcon Air Express	PANTHER	United States	
	FAU	Falcon Airline	FALCON AIRLINE	Nigeria	
	FBU	French Bee	FRENCH BEE	France	
IH		Falcon Aviation		Sweden	
	FVS	Falcon Aviation Services	FALCON AVIATION	United Arab Emirates	
	FJC	Falcon Jet Centre	FALCONJET	United Kingdom	
	FAW	Falwell Aviation	FALWELL	United States	
FE	FEA	Far Eastern Air Transport	Far Eastern	Taiwan	
FD		Royal Flying Doctor Service	FLYDOC	Australia	
	FDL	Farmingdale State University	FARMINGDALE STATE	United States	
	FAH	Farnair Hungary	BLUE STRIP	Hungary	
	FRN	Farnair Netherlands	FARNED	Netherlands	Defunct, ICAO code in use by another company
	FAT	ASL Airlines Switzerland	FARNER	Switzerland	Previously: Farnair Switzerland
	RAF	Farnas Aviation Services	FARNAS	Sudan	
	HBL	Faroecopter	HELIBLUE	Denmark	
F6	RCK	FaroeJet	ROCKROSE	Faroe Islands	
	FRW	Farwest Airlines	FARWEST	United States	
F3	FSW	Faso Airways	FASO	Burkina Faso	
	FHL	Fast Helicopters	FINDON	United Kingdom	
	FAY	Fayban Air Services	FAYBAN AIR	Nigeria	
	SKM	Fayetteville Flying Service and Scheduled Skyways System	SKYTEM	United States	
	FDR	Federal Air	FEDAIR	South Africa	
	FLL	Federal Airlines	FEDERAL AIRLINES	Sweden	
	DCN	Federal Armed Forces	DIPLOMATIC CLEARANCE	Germany	
	FRM	Federal Armored Service	FEDARM	United States	
	NHK	Federal Aviation Administration	NIGHTHAWK	United States	
FX	FDX	FedEx Express	FEDEX	United States	
	FNK	Feniks Airline	AURIKA	Kazakhstan	
	FER	Feria Aviación	FERIA	Spain	
N8	HGK	Fika Salaama Airlines	SALAAMA	Uganda	
4S	FNC	Finalair Congo	FINALAIR CONGO	Republic of the Congo	
	FAK	Financial Airxpress	FACTS	United States	
	FBF	Fine Airlines	FINE AIR	United States	
	FTR	Finist'air	FINISTAIR	France	
AY	FIN	Finnair	FINNAIR	Finland	
FC	WBA	Finncomm Airlines	WESTBIRD	Finland	
	FNF	Finnish Air Force	FINNFORCE	Finland	
	FIH	FinnHEMS	FINNHEMS	Finland	
FY	FFM	Firefly	FIREFLY	Malaysia	
7F	FAB	First Air	FIRST AIR	Canada	
	JRF	First Air Transport		Japan	
	FCC	First Cambodia Airlines	FIRST CAMBODIA	Cambodia	
	FCA	Fly-Coop Air Service	COOPAIR	Hungary	
	MBL	First City Air	FIRST CITY	United Kingdom	
	GGA	First Flying Squadron	JAWJA	United States	
	FIR	First Line Air	FIRSTLINE AIR	Sierra Leone	
	FTS	First Sabre	FIRST SABRE	Mexico	
8F	FFR	Fischer Air	FISCHER	Czech Republic	
	FFP	Fischer Air Polska	FLYING FISH	Poland	
8D	EXV	FitsAir	EXPOAVIA	Sri Lanka	
	FSX	Flagship Express Services	FLAG	United States	
F8	FLE	Flair Airlines	FLAIR	Canada	
	WAF	Flamenco Airways	FLAMENCO	United States	
	FMR	Flamingo Air	FLAMINGO AIR	United States	
	FLN	Flamingo Air-Line	ILIAS	Kazakhstan	
	FSH	Flash Airlines	FLASH	Egypt	
	BWY	Fleet Requirements Air Direction Unit	BROADWAY	United Kingdom	
	FLR	Fleetair	FLEETAIR	South Africa	
	FXY	Flexair	FLEXY	Netherlands	Defunct
	FXT	Flexflight		Denmark	
	TUD	Flight Alaska	TUNDRA	United States	
	FCK	FCS Flight Calibration Services	NAV CHECKER	Germany	
	VOR	Flight Calibration Services Ltd.	FLIGHT CAL	United Kingdom	
	FCV	Flight Centre Victoria	NAVAIR	Canada	
	FCP	Nelson Aviation College Ltd	FLIGHTCORP	New Zealand	Nelson Aviation College Archived 2017-06-07 at the Wayback Machine
	FDP	Flight Dispatch Services		Poland	
	FLX	Flight Express, Inc.	FLIGHT EXPRESS	United States	
	CFI	Flight Inspection Center of the General Administration of Civil Aviation in China	CHINA JET	China	
	LTS	Flight Inspections and Systems	SPECAIR	Russia	
	IVJ	Flight International	INVADER JACK	United States	
	MIT	Flight Line	MATCO	United States	
	FOI	Flight Ops International		United States	
	OPT	Flight Options	OPTIONS	United States	
	CLB	Flight Precision Limited	CALIBRATOR	United Kingdom	
	FSL	Flight Safety Limited	FLIGHTSAFETY	United Kingdom	
	FSU	Flight Support Sweden		Sweden	
	CCK	Flight Trac	CABLE CHECK	United States	
	AYR	Flight Training Europe	CYGNET	Spain	
	FWQ	Flight West	UNITY	Australia	
	KLO	Flight-Ops International	KLONDIKE	Canada	
	CSK	Flightcraft	CASCADE	United States	
	FEX	Flightexec	FLIGHTEXEC	Canada	
B5	FLT	Flightline	FLIGHTLINE	United Kingdom	defunct
	FTL	Flightline	FLIGHT-AVIA	Spain	
	FPS	Flightpass Limited	FLIGHTPASS	United Kingdom	
	FSR	Flightstar Corporation	FLIGHTSTAR	United States	
	KDZ	Flightworks	KUDZU	United States	Avior Technologies Operations
	FAZ	Flint Aviation Services	FLINT AIR	United States	
	KWX	Florida Aerocharter	KAY DUB	United States	Allocated in 2014
	OJY	Florida Air	OHJAY	United States	
	FAS	Florida Air Cargo	FLORIDA CARGO	United States	Allocated in 2014
PA	FCL	Florida Coastal Airlines	FLORIDA COASTAL	United States	
	FFS	Florida Department of Agriculture	FORESTRY	United States	
	TCF	Florida Institute of Technology	TECH FLIGHT	United States	
	FJS	Florida Jet Service	FLORIDAJET	United States	
RF	FWL	Florida West International Airways	FLO WEST	United States	Merged into Atlas Air Worldwide Holdings. Defunct as of 28 February 2017, IATA code now allocated to another user
	FFG	Flugdienst Fehlhaber	WITCHCRAFT	Germany	
	FLU	Flugschule Basel	YELLOW FLYER	Switzerland	
	EZB	Flugschule Eichenberger	EICHENBURGER	Switzerland	
	FWZ	Flugwerkzeuge Aviation Software		Austria	
	VNX	Fly Advance	VANCE	United States	Allocated in 2014
F2	FLM	Fly Air	FLY WORLD	Turkey	
8W	EDR	Fly All Ways	BIRDVIEW	Suriname	
G6	ACY	Fly Arna	ARNA	Armenia	
	FCT	Fly CI Limited	DEALER	United Kingdom	
	FEE	Fly Europa Limited	FLY EURO	United Kingdom	
	FXL	Fly Excellent	FLY EXCELLENT	Sweden	
9Y	FGE	Fly Georgia	GEORGIA WING	Georgia	
	NVJ	Fly International Airways	NOUVINTER	Tunisia	
OJ	FJM	Fly Jamaica Airways	GREENHEART	Jamaica	defunct
9P	FJL	Fly Jinnah	Okaab	Pakistan	
	FIL	Fly Line	FLYLINE	Spain	
SH	FLY	Fly Me Sweden	FLYBIRD	Sweden	
FP	PVV	Fly Pro	Sunday	Moldova	
	FRB	Fly Rak	RAKWAY	United Arab Emirates	
6P	IAD	Fly Wex	FLYWEX	Italy	
F6	VAW	Fly2Sky	SOFIA JET	Bulgaria	
	FYA	Flyant	FLYANT	Spain	
D7	XFA	FlyAsianXpress	FAX AIR	Malaysia	
F7	BBO	Flybaboo	BABOO	Switzerland	
BE	BEE	Flybe	JERSEY	United Kingdom	Formerly Jersey European Airways
FO	FBZ	Flybondi	BONDI	Argentina	
	FCE	Flycolumbia	FLYCOLUMBIA	Spain	
FT	FEG	FlyEgypt	SKY EGYPT	Egypt	
	GVG	Flygaktiebolaget Gota Vingar	BLUECRAFT	Sweden	
Y2	GSM	Flyglobespan	GLOBESPAN	United Kingdom	defunct
	FPA	Flygprestanda		Sweden	
SX	TOR	FlyGTA Airlines	HOMERUN	Canada	
	ETS	Flygtransporter I Nykoping	EXTRANS	Sweden	
	INU	Flyguppdraget Backamo	INSTRUCTOR	Sweden	
W3	FYH	Flyhy Cargo Airlines	FLY HIGH	Thailand	
	FCR	Flying Carpet Company	FLYING CARPET	Lebanon	
	FYG	Flying Service	FLYING GROUP	Belgium	
	FGP	Flying-Research Aerogeophysical Center	FLYING CENTER	Russia	
TE	LIL	FlyLal	LITHUANIA AIR	Lithuania	defunct
	FLK	Flylink Express	FLYLINK	Spain	
XY	KNE	Flynas	NAS EXPRESS	Saudi Arabia	
LF	NDC	FlyNordic	NORDIC	Sweden	defunct
FP	FRE	FlyPelican	PELICAN	Australia	Pelican Airlines Pty Ltd since 1 June 2015
FS	FOX	Flyr	GREENSTAR	Norway	
	FTM	Flyteam Aviation	FLYTEAM	United Kingdom	
VK	FVK	FlyViking	BALDER	Norway	defunct
	FMI	FMI Air	FIRST MYANMAR	Myanmar	
	FKS	Focus Air	FOCUS	United States	Omega Air Holdings
	FOP	Fokker		Netherlands	Flight Operations
	NOF	Fonnafly	FONNA	Norway	
	FOB	Ford Motor Company	FORDAIR	United Kingdom	
VY	FOS	Formosa Airlines		Taiwan	defunct
	FOR	Formula One Management	FORMULA	United Kingdom	
	FHS	Forth and Clyde Helicopter Services	HELISCOT	United Kingdom	
	FXC	Fortunair Canada	AIR FUTURE	Canada	
BN		Forward Air International Airlines		United States	
	FSA	Foster Aviation	FOSTER-AIR	United States	
	JFY	Foster Yeoman	YEOMAN	United Kingdom	
	FTE	Fotografia F3	FOTOGRAFIA	Spain	
5F	FIA	FlyOne	FIA	Moldova	Allocated in 2016
3F	FIE	FlyOne Armenia	ARMRIDER	Armenia	
HK	FSC	Four Star Aviation / Four Star Cargo	FOUR STAR	United States	Virgin Islands
	WDS	Four Winds Aviation	WINDS	United States	
	FXR	Foxair	WILDFOX	Italy	
	FDO	France Douanes	FRENCH CUSTOM	France	
FH	FHY	Freebird Airlines	FREEBIRD AIR	Turkey	
SJ	FOM	Freedom Air	FREE AIR	New Zealand	defunct
FP	FRE	Freedom Air	FREEDOM	United States	Aviation Services
	FFF	Freedom Air Services	INTER FREEDOM	Nigeria	
	FRL	Freedom Airlines	FREEDOM AIR	United States	ICAO Code and callsign withdrawn
	FAS	Freedom Airways	FREEDOM AIRWAYS	Cyprus	
	FWC	Freeway Air	FREEWAY	Netherlands	Defunct
	FRG	Freight Runners Express	FREIGHT RUNNERS	United States	
	FAF	Force Aerienne Francaise	FRENCH AIR FORCE	France	
	FMY	Aviation Legere De L'Armee De Terre	FRENCH ARMY	France	
	FNY	France Marine Nationale	FRENCH NAVY	France	
	FRR	Fresh Air	FRESH AIR	Nigeria	
	BZY	Fresh Air Aviation	BREEZY	United States	2015
	FAE	Freshaer	WILDGOOSE	United Kingdom	
	FAL	Friendship Air Alaska	FRIENDSHIP	United States	
	FLF	Friendship Airlines	FRIEND AIR	Uganda	
	FGY	Froggy Corporate Aviation		Australia	
F9	FFT	Frontier Airlines	FRONTIER FLIGHT	United States	
	ITR	Frontier Commuter	OUT BACK	United States	
2F	FTA	Frontier Flying Service	FRONTIER-AIR	United States	
	FNG	Frontier Guard	FINNGUARD	Finland	
	FUJ	Fujairah Aviation Centre	FUJAIRAH	United Arab Emirates	
	CFJ	Fujian Airlines	FUJIAN	China	
	GAX	Full Express	GRAND AIRE	United States	
	FAM	Fumigación Aérea Andaluza	FAASA	Spain	
	FFY	Fun Flying Thai Air Service	FUN FLYING	Thailand	
	ROG	FundaciÃ³ Rego	REGO	Spain	
	FUN	Funtshi Aviation Service	FUNTSHI	Democratic Republic of the Congo	
	FGL	Futura Gael	Applewood	Ireland	defunct
FH	FUA	Futura International Airways	FUTURA	Spain	defunct
FZ	FDB	Flydubai	SKYDUBAI	UAE	
	FWK	Flightworks		United States	
	ACT	Flight Line	AMERICAN CHECK	United States	
	FRF	Fleet Air International	FAIRFLEET	Hungary	
	FUM	Fuxion Line Mexico	FUNLINE	Mexico	
	FWR	FlightAware	FLIGHT AWARE	United States	3rd party Privacy ICAO Address (PIA) callsign used to obscure true airplane registrations
	GML	G & L Aviation	GEEANDEL	South Africa	
	DBC	Gemini Air Group	DIAMOND BACK	United States	Allocated in 2014
	GOP	Gospa Air	GOSPA AIR	Mexico	
	HGT	GMJ Air Shuttle	HIGHTECH	United States	Private air shuttle for Intel Corporation Employees
	GRE	Greenlandcopter		Denmark	
	GMQ	Germania Express	CORGI	Germany	
	KNM	GB Helicopters	KINGDOM	United Kingdom	
	GCW	Global Air Crew	GLOBALCREW	Denmark	
	GBH	Global Avia Handling		Russia	
Y5	GMR	Golden Myanmar Airlines	GOLDEN MYANMAR	Myanmar	
	EXH	G5 Executive	BATMAN	Switzerland	
	MTA	GAK/Mitchell Aero	GAK AVIATION	United States	
	GGS	GATSA	GATSA	Mexico	
	GBX	GB Airlink	ISLAND TIGER	United States	
GT	GBL	GB Airways	GEEBEE AIRWAYS	United Kingdom	
	GCS	GCS Air Service	GALION	United States	
	FFU	GEC Marconi Avionics	FERRANTI	United Kingdom	
	GCC	GECAS	GECAS	Ireland	
	GEN	GENSA	GENSA-BRASIL	Brazil	
	GET	Get High	AIR FLOW	Portugal	
	GET	GETRA	GETRA	Equatorial Guinea	ICAO Code no longer allocated
	GFW	GFW Aviation		Australia	
	GGT	Trans Island Airways	THUNDERBALL	Bahamas	
	GHI	GH Stansted Limited		United Kingdom	
Z5	GMG	GMG Airlines	GMG	Bangladesh	
	GPE	GP Express Airlines	REGIONAL EXPRESS	United States	
	GPR	GPM Aeroservicio	GPM AEROSERVICIO	Mexico	
	GIB	GR-Avia	GRAVIA	Guinea	
	BMK	GST Aero Aircompany	MURAT	Kazakhstan	
	GTX	GTA Air	BIG-DEE	United States	
	GAH	Ga-Ma Helicoptere	GAMHELICO	France	
	GBE	Gabon Express	GABEX	Gabon	
	GRT	Gabon-Air-Transport		Gabon	
	GIG	Gacela Air Cargo	GACELA AIR	Mexico	
	GFC	Gail Force Express	GAIL FORCE	United States	
	GNJ	Gain Jet Aviation	HERCULES JET	Greece	
	SWF	Galair International	GALAIR	United Kingdom	
	GLS	Galaircervis	GALS	Ukraine	
7O	GAL	Galaxy Air	GALAXY	Kyrgyzstan	
	GXY	Galaxy Airlines	GALAX	Japan	
	GAS	Galena Air Service	GALENA AIR SERVICE	United States	
1G		Galileo International		United States	
	GMA	Gama Aviation	GAMA	United Kingdom	
	GCH	Gama Aviation Switzerland	GAMA SWISS	Switzerland	
GC	GNR	Gambia International Airlines	GAMBIA INTERNATIONAL	Gambia	
	NML	Gambia New Millennium Air	NEWMILL	Gambia	
	GMJ	Gamisa Aviación	GAMISA	Spain	
G7	GNF	Gandalf Airlines	Gandalf	Italy	
	GAN	Gander Aviation	GANAIR	Canada	
	GSA	Garden State Airlines	GARDEN STATE	United States	
	AHM	Garrison Aviation	AIR HURON	Canada	
GA	GIA	Garuda Indonesia	INDONESIA	Indonesia	
	GHS	Gatari Hutama Air Services	GATARI	Indonesia	
	EGO	Gauteng Air Cargo	GAUTENG	South Africa	
	GVN	Gavina	GAVINA	Spain	
4G	GZP	Gazpromavia	GAZPROMAVIA	Russia	
	GEE	Geesair	GEESAIR	Canada	
	GLX	Gelix Airlines	RUSSIAN BIRD	Russia	
GR	GCO	Gemini Air Cargo	GEMINI	United States	
	GAB	Gendall Air	GENDALL	Canada	
	GDB	Gendarmerie Belge	BELGIAN GENERMERIE	Belgium	
	FGN	National Gendarmerie	FRANCE GENDARME	France	
	SWK	General Aerospace	SKYWALKER	Canada	
	GWS	General Airways	GENAIR	South Africa	
	GNZ	General Aviation	GONZO	Poland	
	GTH	General Aviation Flying Services	GOTHAM	United States	
	XGA	General Aviation Terminal		Canada	
	GMC	General Motors	GENERAL MOTORS	United States	
	GNX	Genex		Belarus	
	GSL	Geographic Air Surveys	SURVEY-CANADA	Canada	
A9	TGZ	Georgian Airways	TAMAZI	Georgia	
	FGA	Georgian Aviation Federation	GEORGIA FED	Georgia	
	GGF	Georgian Cargo Airlines Africa	GEORGIAN AFRICA	Senegal	
QB	GFG	Georgian National Airlines	NATIONAL	Georgia	
		Great Barrier Airlines		New Zealand	Not ICAO allocated – GBA issued for domestic use by the Civil Aviation Authority of New Zealand
	GAF	German Air Force	GERMAN AIR FORCE	Germany	
	GAM	German Army	GERMAN ARMY	Germany	
	GNY	German Navy	GERMAN NAVY	Germany	
HE	LGW	Luftfahrtgesellschaft Walter	WALTER	Germany	Former name: Luftfahrtgesellschaft Walter
ZQ	GER	German Airways	GERMAN EAGLE	Germany	
	GHY	German Sky Airlines	GERMAN SKY	Germany	
ST	GMI	Germania	GERMANIA	Germany	
4U	GWI	Germanwings	GERMAN WINGS	Germany	
	GDN	Gerry's Dnata		Pakistan	
	GFD	Gesellschaft Fur Flugzieldarstellung	KITE	Germany	
GP	RIV	APG Airlines	RIVERA	France	
	GES	Gestair	GESTAIR	Spain	
	GTR	Gestar	STAR GESTAR	Chile	
	GJT	Gestión Aérea Ejecutiva	BANJET	Spain	
	GHT	Ghadames Air Transport		Libya	
GH	GLP	Globus Airlines	GLOBUS	Russia	
GH	GHA	Ghana Airways	GHANA	Ghana	defunct
G0	GHB	Ghana International Airlines	GHANA AIRLINES	Ghana	
	NTC	Gibson Aviation	NIGHT CHASE	United States	
	RPS	Global Air Charter	RESPONSE	United States	
	GAG	Greybird Pilot Academy	GEEBIRD	Denmark	
	DMJ	Global Air	DAMOJH	Mexico	defunct
	GBS	Global Air Services Nigeria	GLOBAL SERVE	Nigeria	
	GLC	Global Aircargo		Bahrain	
		Global Airways (Turks and Caicos)		Turks and Caicos Islands	
	BSP	Global Airways (BSP)		Democratic Republic of Congo	
	GLB	Global Airways (GLB)	GLO-AIR	United States	Air Castle Corporation
	GBB	Global Aviation Operations	GLOBE	South Africa	
	GAK	Global Aviation and Services Group	AVIAGROUP	Libya	
	GGZ	Global Georgian Airways	GLOBAL GEORGIAN	Georgia	
	GLJ	Global Jet Austria	GLOBAL JET AUSTRIA	Austria	
	NSM	Global Jet Corporation	THUNDERCLOUD	United States	
	SVW	Global Jet Luxembourg	SILVER ARROWS	Luxembourg	
	GSK	Global Sky Aircharter	GLOBAL SKY	United States	
	GSS	Global Supply Systems	JET LIFT	United Kingdom	
	XGS	Global System		United States	
	XGW	Global Weather Dynamics		United States	
	GLW	Global Wings		Japan	
	GJA	Globe Jet		Lebanon	
	GAC	GlobeAir	DREAM TEAM	Austria	
6G	RLX	Go2Sky	RELAX	Slovakia	
G8	GOW	GoAir	GOAIR	India	
GK		Go One Airways		United Kingdom	Defunct?
G7	GJS	GoJet Airlines	LINDBERGH	United States	
	GGE	Gobierno De Guinea Ecuatorial		Equatorial Guinea	
	GOF	Gof-Air	GOF-AIR	Mexico	
	GOI	Gofir	SWISS HAWK	Switzerland	
G3	GLO	Gol Transportes Aéreos	GOL TRANSPORTE	Brazil	Brazilian low-cost airline.
	GBT	Gold Belt Air Transport	GOLD BELT	Canada	defunct
	GDA	GoldAir	AIR PARTNER	United Kingdom	
	GDK	Goldeck-Flug	GOLDECK FLUG	Austria	
DC	GAO	Golden Air	GOLDEN	Sweden	
	GDD	Golden Airlines	GOLDEN AIRLINES	United States	
	GPA	Golden Pacific Airlines	GOLDEN PAC	United States	
	GRS	Golden Rule Airlines	GOLDEN RULE	Kyrgyzstan	
	GLD	Golden Star Air Cargo	GOLDEN STAR	Sudan	
	GOS	Goldfields Air Services		Australia	
	GAQ	Golfe Air Quebec	GOLFAIR	Canada	
	GLE	Goliaf Air	GOLIAF AIR	São Tomé and Príncipe	
	GOM	Gomel Airlines	GOMEL	Belarus	
5Z	GON	Gonini Air Services	GONINI	Suriname	defunct
	RDR	Goodridge (UK) Limited	RED STAR	United Kingdom	
G1		Gorkha Airlines	GORKHA AIRLINES	Nepal	?ICAO
	GOR	Gorlitsa Airlines	GORLITSA	Ukraine	
	HKG	Government Flying Service	HONGKONG GOVERNMENT	Hong Kong SAR of China	
	GRZ	Government of Zambia Communications Flight	COM FLIGHT	Zambia	
	HLD	Grampian Flight Centre	GRANITE	United Kingdom	
	GAV	Granada Aviación	GRANAVI	Spain	
	GAE	Grand Aire Express	GRAND EXPRESS	United States	
	GND	Grand Airways	GRAND VEGAS	United States	
	CVU	Grand Canyon Airlines	CANYON VIEW	United States	
GV	GUN	Grant Aviation	HOOT	United States	
	LMK	Grantex Aviation	LANDMARK	United Kingdom	
	GRA	Great American Airways	GREAT AMERICAN	United States	Defunct
	GRA	Guardian Air Asset Management	FLEX	South Africa	issued in 2017
ZK	GLA	Great Lakes Airlines	LAKES AIR	United States	
	GLU	Great Lakes Airways (Uganda)	LAKES CARGO	Uganda	
	GRP	Great Plains Airlines	GREAT PLAINS	United States	
IJ	GWL	Great Wall Airlines	GREAT WALL	China	
	GWA	Great Western Air	G-W AIR	United States	
HB	HGB	Greater Bay Airlines	GREATER BAY	Hong Kong	
	HNA	Greek Navy	HELLENIC NAVY	Greece	
	GFF	Griffin Aviation	GRIFFIN AIR	Cyprus	
	GXA	Grixona	GRIXONA	Moldova	
	GZD	Grizodubova Air Company	GRIZODUBOVA AIR	Russia	
	HTG	Grossmann Air Service	GROSSMANN	Austria	
	GSJ	Grossmann Jet Service	GROSSJET	Czech Republic	
	GHV	Ground Handling Service de Mexico	GROUND HANDLING	Mexico	
	GPM	Grup Air-Med	GRUPOMED	Spain	
	EJC	Grupo De Aviación Ejecutiva	GRUPOEJECUTIVA	Mexico	
	TAT	Grupo TACA	TACA-COSTARICA	Costa Rica	
	VMM	Grupo Vuelos Mediterraneo	VUELOS MED	Spain	
	GMT	Grupo Aéreo Monterrey	GRUPOMONTERREY	Mexico	
	GSY	Guard Systems	GUARD AIR	Norway	
G6	BSR	Guine Bissaur Airlines	BISSAU AIRLINES	Guinea-Bissau	
	GIJ	Guinea Airways	GUINEA AIRWAYS	Guinea	
	GNC	Guinea Cargo	GUINEA CARGO	Equatorial Guinea	
J9	GIF	Guinee Airlines	GUINEE AIRLINES	Guinea	defunct
	GEA	Guinea Ecuatorial Airlines	GEASA	Equatorial Guinea	
	GIQ	Guinee Paramount Airlines	GUIPAR	Guinea	
	CGH	Guizhou Airlines	GUIZHOU	China	
	GUS	Guja	GUJA	Mexico	
G8	GUJ	Gujarat Airways	GUJARATAIR	India	
	TSU	Gulf & Caribbean Cargo / Contract Air Cargo	TRANSAUTO	United States	
	GUF	Gulf African Airlines	GULF AFRICAN	The Gambia	
GF	GFA	Gulf Air	GULF AIR	Bahrain	
	GAT	Gulf Air Inc	GULF TRANS	United States	
	GCN	Gulf Central Airlines	GULF CENTRAL	United States	
	SFY	Gulf Flite Center	SKY FLITE	United States	
	GPC	Gulf Pearl Air Lines	AIR GULFPEARL	Libya	
	GLF	Gulfstream Aerospace	GULFSTREAM TEST	United States	
	GFS	Gulfstream Airlines	GULFSTAR	United States	
	GFT	Gulfstream International Airlines	GULF FLIGHT	United States	
	GUL	Gull Air	GULL-AIR	United States	
	GUM	Gum Air	GUM AIR	Suriname	
	GDH	Guneydogu Havacilik Isletmesi	RISING SUN	Turkey	
GY		Guyana Airways 2000			
	GWN	Gwyn Aviation	GWYN	United Kingdom	
H4		Héli Sécurité Helicopter Airlines		France	
EO	ALX	Hewa Bora Airways	ALLCONGO	Democratic Republic of the Congo	
	AHT	HTA Helicopteros	HELIAPRA	Portugal	
	ETI	H-Bird Aviation Services AB	JETHAWK	Sweden	
	HSN	H.S.AVIATION CO., LTD.	H.S.AVIATION	Thailand	
	HAY	Hamburg Airways	HAMBURG AIRWAYS	Germany	defunct
	HCK	Heli-Charter	HELI-CHARTER	United Kingdom	
	HTB	Helix-Craft Aviation	HELIX-CRAFT	Panama	2014
	HAF	Hellenic Air Force	HELLENIC AIR FORCE	Greece	
	HRN	Heron Luftfahrt	HERONAIR	Germany	
	HYP	Hyperion Aviation	HYPERION	Malta	
	HFM	Hi Fly Malta	MOONRAKER	Malta	
A5	HOP	Hop!	AIR HOP	France	
	HLA	HC Airlines	HEAVYLIFT	United Kingdom	
	HWD	HPM Investments	FLITEWISE	United Kingdom	
	KTR	HT Helikoptertransport	COPTER TRANS	Sweden	
		Hacienda Airlines		United States	defunct - 1957 to July 10, 1962
	FMS	Hadison Aviation	HADI	United States	
H6	HAG	Hageland Aviation Services	HAGELAND	United States	
	POW	Hagondale Limited	AIRNET	United Kingdom	
HR	HHN	Hahn Air	ROOSTER	Germany	
H1		Hahn Air Systems		Germany	
HU	CHH	Hainan Airlines	HAINAN	China	
1R		Hainan Phoenix Information Systems		China	
	HLS	Haiti Air Freight		Haiti	
2T	HAM	Haiti Ambassador Airlines		Haiti	
	HTI	Haiti International Air	HAITI INTERNATIONAL	Haiti	
	HRB	Haiti International Airline	HAITI AIRLINE	Haiti	
	HNR	Haiti National Airlines (HANA)	HANAIR	Haiti	
	HTN	Haiti North Airline		Haiti	
	HTC	Haiti Trans Air	HAITI TRANSAIR	Haiti	
	HBC	Haitian Aviation Line	HALISA	Haiti	
	HAJ	Hajvairy Airlines	HAJVAIRY	Pakistan	
	HKL	Hak Air	HAK AIRLINE	Nigeria	
	HLH	Hala Air	HALA AIR	Sudan	
	HCV	Halcyonair	CREOLE	Cape Verde	
4R	HHI	Hamburg International	HAMBURG JET	Germany	
	HJL	Hamlin Jet	BIZJET	United Kingdom	
	HMM	Hamra Air	HAMRA	United Arab Emirates	
	WVA	Hand D Aviation	WABASH VALLEY	United States	
	HGR	Hangar 8	HANG	United Kingdom	
	HGD	Hangard Aviation	HANGARD	Mongolia	
	HAN	Hansung Airlines	HANSUNG AIR	Republic of Korea	
X3	HLX	Hapag-Lloyd Express	YELLOW CAB	Germany	Became TUI fly Deutschland in 2007
HF	HLF	Hapagfly	HAPAG LLOYD	Germany	Became TUI fly Deutschland in 2007
HB	HAR	Harbor Airlines	HARBOR	United States	
HQ	HMY	Harmony Airways	HARMONY	Canada	
	NBR	Haughey Air	NORBROOK	United Kingdom	
	PYN	Haverfordwest Air Charter Services	POYSTON	United Kingdom	
	HAV	Havilah Air Services	HAVILAH	Nigeria	
HA	HAL	Hawaiian Airlines	HAWAIIAN	United States	
HP		Hawaiian Pacific Airlines		United States	defunct
	HKR	Hawk Air	AIR HAW	Argentina	
	HMX	Hawk De Mexico	HAWK MEXICO	Mexico	
BH		Hawkair		Canada	defunct since 2016
	HKI	Hawkaire	HAWKEYE	United States	
	HZL	Hazelton Airlines	HAZELTON	Australia	Defunct.
HN	HVY	Heavylift Cargo Airlines	HEAVY CARGO	Australia	
	HVL	Heavylift International	HEAVYLIFT INTERNATIONAL	United Arab Emirates	
NS	HBH	Hebei Airlines	HEBEI AIR	China	
	HDC	Helcopteros De Cataluna	HELICATALUNA	Spain	
	HCB	Helenair (Barbados)	HELEN	Barbados	
	HCL	Helenair Corporation	HELENCORP	Saint Lucia	
	HHP	Helenia Helicopter Service	HELENIA	Denmark	
	HLR	Heli Air Services	HELI BULGARIA	Bulgaria	
	ALJ	Heli Ambulance Team	ALPIN HELI	Austria	
	HEB	Heli Bernina	HELIBERNINA	Switzerland	
	HFR	Heli France	HELIFRANCE	France	
	HYH	Heli Hungary	HELIHUNGARY	Hungary	
	HLM	Heli Medwest De Mexico	HELIMIDWEST	Mexico	
	HLI	Heli Securite	HELI SAINT-TROPEZ	France	
	HTP	Heli Trip	HELI TRIP	Mexico	
	HLU	Heli Union Heli Prestations	HELI UNION	France	
	MCM	Heli-Air-Monaco	HELI AIR	Monaco	
	HHE	Heli-Holland	HELI HOLLAND	Netherlands	
	HRA	Heli-Iberica	ERICA	Spain	
	HIF	Heli-Iberica Fotogrametria	HIFSA	Spain	
	HIG	Heli-Inter Guyane	INTER GUYANNE	France	
	HLK	Heli-Link	HELI-LINK	Switzerland	
	HMC	Heliamerica De Mexico	HELIAMERICA	Mexico	
	HEA	Heliavia-Transporte Aéreo	HELIAVIA	Portugal	
	CDY	Heliaviation Limited	CADDY	United Kingdom	
	HIB	Helibravo Aviacao	HELIBRAVO	Portugal	
	HLC	Helicap	HELICAP	France	
	COV	Helicentre Coventry	HELICENTRE	United Kingdom	
	HEL	Helicol	HELICOL	Colombia	
	HCP	Helicopter	HELI CZECH	Czech Republic	
	JKY	Helicopter & Aviation Services	JOCKEY	United Kingdom	
	MVK	Helicopter Training & Hire	MAVRIK	United Kingdom	
	HAP	Helicopteros Aero Personal	HELIPERSONAL	Mexico	
	HAA	Helicopteros Agroforestal	AGROFORESTAL	Chile	
	HNT	Helicopteros Internacionales	HELICOP INTER	Mexico	
	HEN	Helicópteros Y Vehículos Nacionales Aéreos	HELINAC	Mexico	
	HHH	Helicsa	HELICSA	Spain	
JB	JBA	Helijet	HELIJET	Canada	
	HDR	Helikopterdrift	HELIDRIFT	Norway	
	SCO	Helikopterservice Euro Air	SWEDCOPTER	Sweden	
	OCE	Heliocean	HELIOCEAN	France	
ZU	HCY	Helios Airways	HELIOS	Cyprus	defunct since 7 November 2006
	HLP	Helipistas	HELIPISTAS	Spain	
	HPL	Heliportugal	HELIPORTUGAL	Portugal	
	HEC	Heliservicio Campeche	HELICAMPECHE	Mexico	
	HSU	Helisul	HELIS	Portugal	
	HSI	Heliswiss	HELISWISS	Switzerland	
	HLT	Helitafe	HELITAFE	Mexico	
	HIT	Helitalia	HELITALIA	Italy	
	OFA	Helitaxi Ofavi	OFAVI	Mexico	
	HLT	Helitours	HELITOURS	Sri Lanka	
9I	HTA	Helitrans	SCANBIRD	Norway	
	HTS	Helitrans Air Service	HELITRANS	United States	
	HLW	Heliworks	HELIWORKS	Chile	
HJ	HEJ	Hellas Jet	HELLAS JET	Greece	ceased operation in 2010
HW	FHE	Hello	FLYHELLO	Switzerland	
	HLG	Helog	HELOG	Switzerland	
2L	OAW	Helvetic Airways	HELVETIC	Switzerland	
	HMS	Hemus Air	HEMUS AIR	Bulgaria	
	HAC	Henebury Aviation		Australia	
	SSH	Heritage Flight (Valley Air Services)	SNOWSHOE	United States	
	MRX	Herman's Markair Express	SPEEDMARK	United States	
	HED	Heritage Aviation Developments	FLAPJACK	United Kingdom	
UD	HER	Hex'Air	HEX AIRLINE	France	
	HHS	Hi-Jet Helicopter Services	HIJET	Suriname	
5K	HFY	Hi Fly	SKY FLYER	Portugal	
	HLB	High-Line Airways	HIGH-LINE	Canada	
	HWY	Highland Airways	HIWAY	United Kingdom	
H9	HIM	Himalaya Airlines	HIMALAYA	Nepal	
H7	HYM	HiSky	SKY MOLDOVA	Moldova	
H4	HYS	HiSky Europe	SKY EUROPE	Romania	
	HSH	Hispánica de Aviación	HASA	Spain	
	HIS	Hispaniola Airways	HISPANIOLA	Dominican Republic	
VM	VMS	His Majesty King Maha Vajiralongkorn	VICTOR MIKE	Thailand	holding airline, renamed on his accession.
	HGA	Hogan Air	HOGAN AIR	United States	
	NTH	Hokkaido Air System	NORTH AIR	Japan	
	ABH	Hokuriki-Koukuu Company		Japan	
H5	HOA	Hola Airlines	HOLA	Spain	
	HIN	Holding International Group	HOLDING GROUP	Mexico	
	HOL	Holiday Airlines (US Airline)	HOLIDAY	United States	
HC	HCC	Holidays Czech Airlines	CZECH HOLIDAYS	Czech Republic	
	HTR	Holstenair Lubeck	HOLSTEN	Germany	
	HMV	Homac Aviation	HOMAC	Luxembourg	
	HAS	Honduras Airlines	HONDURAS AIR	Honduras	
HX	CRK	Hong Kong Airlines	BAUHINIA	Hong Kong	
RH	HKC	Hong Kong Air Cargo	MASCOT	Hong Kong	
UO	HKE	Hong Kong Express Airways	HONGKONG SHUTTLE	Hong Kong	
A6	HTU	Hongtu Airlines	HONGLAND	China	
	HEX	Honiara Cargo Express	HONIARA CARGO	Solomon Islands	
H1		Hooters Air	Hooters Air	United States	The airline was established in 2003 and started operations on March 6, 2003. On April 17, 2006, Hooters Air ceased operations, halting scheduled Public Charter service and refunding tickets.
	HPJ	Hop-A-Jet	HOPA-JET	United States	
HH		Hope Air	HOPE AIR	Canada	
QX	QXE	Horizon Air	HORIZON AIR	United States	
	KOK	Horizon Air Service	KOKO	United States	
	HSM	Horizon Air for Transport and Training	ALOFUKAIR	Libya	
	HOR	Horizon Air-Taxi	HORIZON	Switzerland	
BN	HZA	Horizon Airlines	HORIZON	Australia	defunct
	HPS	Horizon Plus	HORIZON PLUS	Bangladesh	
	HUD	Horizons Unlimited	HUD	United States	
	HOZ	Horizontes Aéreos	HORIZONTES AEREOS	Mexico	
	HDI	Hoteles Dinamicos	DINAMICOS	Mexico	
	HHO	Houston Helicopters	HOUSTON HELI	United States	
	GGV	Houston Jet Services	GREGG AIR	Austria	
	OZU	Hozu-Avia	HOZAVIA	Kazakhstan	
	HUB	Hub Airlines	HUB	United States	
	HUS	Huessler Air Service	HUESSLER	United States	
	GMH	Hughes Aircraft Company	HUGHES EXPRESS	United States	
HJ	USW	HumoAir	AKSAR	Uzbekistan	
	HUV	Hunair Hungarian Airlines	SILVER EAGLE	Hungary	
	HUF	Hungarian Air Force	HUNGARIAN AIRFORCE	Hungary	
HW	UBD	FlyErbil	HAWLER	Iraqi Kurdistan	
	HYA	Hyack Air	HYACK	Canada	
	HYC	Hydro Air Flight Operations	HYDRO CARGO	South Africa	
	HYD	Hydro-Québec	HYDRO	Canada	
	HKB	Hawker Beechcraft	CLASSIC	United States	
MR	MML	Hunnu Air	TRANS MONGOLIA	Mongolia	
	RPX	HD Air Ltd	RAPEX	United Kingdom	
	SRD	HM Coastguard	COASTGUARD	United Kingdom	
	SRG	HM Coastguard	RESCUE	United Kingdom	Search and Rescue
	WHR	Hummingbird Helicopter Service	WHIRLEYBIRD	United States	
E2	HFA	Air Haifa	AIR HAIFA	Israel	
I4	EXP	Island Air Express	ISLAND EXPRESS	United States	2014
	IWL	Island Wings		Bahamas	2014
IK	KAR	Ikar	IKAR	Russian Federation	
	ICN	Iconair		Pakistan	
	IAC	INTERCHARTER	Romania		
	ITC	International Air Carrier Association		Belgium	
	IDG	IDG Technology Air	INDIGO	Czech Republic	
	IFL	IFL Group	EIFEL	United States	
	RDE	II Lione Alato Arl	FLIGHT RED	United Kingdom	
	IJM	IJM International Jet Management	JET MANAGEMENT	Austria	
	IKK	IKI International Airlines	IKIAIR	Japan	
	IKN	IKON FTO	IKON	Germany	
	BLU	IMP Aviation Services	BLUENOSE	Canada	
	XGG	IMP Group Aviation Services		Canada	
1F		INFINI Travel Information		Japan	Computer Reservation System
	IPA	IPEC Aviation	IPEC	Australia	
	IPM	IPM Europe	SHIPEX	United Kingdom	
	LVB	IRS Airlines	SILVERBIRD	Nigeria	
	ISD	ISD Avia	ISDAVIA	Ukraine	
1U		ITA Software		United States	Computer reservation system
	FDF	IVV Femida		Russia	
IB	IBE	Iberia Airlines	IBERIA	Spain	
II	CSQ	IBC Airways	CHASQUI	United States	
I2	IBS	Iberia Express	IBEREXPRESS	Spain	Charter service, low cost carrier for EU flights of Iberia operating only A320s
	IBR	Ibertour Servicios Aéreos	IBERTOUR	Spain	
	IBT	Ibertrans Aérea	IBERTRANS	Spain	
TY	IWD	Iberworld	IBERWORLD	Spain	
FW	IBX	Ibex Airlines	IBEX	Japan	
	IBC	Ibicenca Air	IBICENCA	Spain	
	AKI	Ibk-Petra		Sudan	
0C	IBL	IBL Aviation	CATOVAIR	Mauritius	
	BBL	IBM Euroflight Operations	BLUE	Switzerland	
	YYY	ICAO			Used by airlines without a specific code
C3	IPR	Independent Carrier (ICAR)	ICAR	Ukraine	
	ICA	Icaro	ICARFLY	Italy	
	ICD	Icaro Air	ICARO	Ecuador	Defunct 2011
	IUS	Icarus	ICARUS	Italy	
	CIC	ICC Canada	AIR TRADER	Canada	
	ICJ	Icejet	ICEJET	Iceland	
HC		Iceland Express		Iceland	defunct
FI	ICE	Icelandair	ICEAIR	Iceland	
	ICG	Icelandic Coast Guard	ICELAND COAST	Iceland	
	RAC	Icar Air	TUZLA AIR	Bosnia and Herzegovina	
	FRC	Icare Franche Compte	FRANCHE COMPTE	France	
	IFM	Ifly	ICOPTER	Greece	
	IKR	Ikaros DK	IKAROS	Denmark	
	CIO	Il Ciocco International Travel Service	CIOCCO	Italy	
	ILV	Il-Avia	ILAVIA	Russia	
	IDL	Ildefonso Redriguez	ILDEFONSO	Mexico	
V8	IAR	Iliamna Air Taxi	ILIAMNA AIR	United States	
	ILP	Ilpo Aruba Cargo		Aruba	
	ILL	Ilyich-Avia	ILYICHAVIA	Ukraine	
	IMR	Imaer	IMAER	Portugal	
	ITX	Imair Airlines	IMPROTEX	Azerbaijan	
	PNX	Imperial Airways	PHOENIX	United States	ICAO code in use by another company, call sign no longer allocated
	IMG	Imperial Cargo Airlines	IMPERIAL AIRLINES	Ghana	
	IMT	Imtrec Aviation	IMTREC	Cambodia	
DH	IDE	Independence Air	INDEPENDENCE AIR	United States	defunct
	IDP	Independent Air Freighters	INDEPENDENT	Australia	
I7	IOA	IndiaOne Air	INDIA FIRST	India	
6E	IGO	IndiGo	IFLY	India	InterGlobe Aviation
	IIL	India International Airways	INDIA INTER	India	
	IFC	Indian Air Force	INDIAN AIRFORCE	India	
IC	IAC	Indian Airlines	INDAIR	India	
	IDR	Indicator Company	INDICATOR	Hungary	
I9	IBU	Indigo Airlines	INDIGO BLUE	United States	
VP	AXC	Indochina Airlines	AIRSPUP	Vietnam	defunct
	IDA	Indonesia Air Transport	INTRA	Indonesia	
QZ	AWQ	Indonesia AirAsia	WAGON AIR	Indonesia	
IO	IAA	Indonesian Airlines	INDO LINES	Indonesia	
	IPN	Industri Pesawat Terbang Nusantara	NUSANTARA	Indonesia	
	ITN	Industrias Titan	TITANLUX	Spain	
	FFI	Infinit Air	INFINIT	Spain	
	INS	Inflite The Jet Centre		United Kingdom	
	IVA	Innotech Aviation	INNOTECH	Canada	
	INC	Insel Air International	INSELAIR	Netherlands Antilles	
	ICC	Institut Cartogràfic de Catalunya	CARTO	Spain	
	INT	Intair	INTAIRCO	Canada	
	INL	Intal Avia	INTAL AVIA	Kyrgyzstan	
	FFL	Intavia Limited		United Kingdom	
	XRA	Intensive Air	INTENSIVE	South Africa	
	ITW	Inter Air	INTER WINGS	Bulgaria	
	INX	Inter Express	INTER-EURO	Turkey	
	IIC	Inter Island Air Charter		Bahamas	2014
H4	IIN	Inter Island Airways		Cape Verde	
	CAR	Inter RCA	QUEBEC ROMEO	Central African Republic	
	NTT	Inter Tropic Airlines	INTER-TROPIC	Sierra Leone	
	TCU	Inter Tropical Aviation	TROPAIR	Suriname	Defunct 2001
	ITA	Inter-Air	CAFEX	United States	
	ICN	Inter-Canadian	INTER-CANADIAN	Canada	
	UGL	Inter-Island Air	UGLY VAN	United States	
	IMA	Inter-Mountain Airways	INTER-MOUNTAIN	United States	
	ITS	Inter-State Aviation	INTER-STATE	United States	
D6	ILN	Interair South Africa	INLINE	South Africa	
	NTE	Interaire	INTERMEX	Mexico	
ZA	SUW	Interavia Airlines	ASTAIR	Russia	
	IVT	Interaviatrans	INTERAVIA	Ukraine	
JY	IWY	InterCaribbean Airways	ISLANDWAYS	Turks and Caicos Islands	Name changed from Interisland Airways and Air Turks & Caicos
RS	ICT	Intercontinental de Aviación	CONTAVIA	Colombia	
	ICP	Intercopters	CHOPER	Spain	
	IFT	Interflight	INTERFLIGHT	United Kingdom	
	IJT	Interflight (Learjet)		United Kingdom	
	RFL	Interfly	INFLY	Italy	
	IFF	Interfreight Forwarding	INTERFREIGHT	Sudan	
	IGN	Interguide Air	DIVINE AIR	Nigeria	
	ISN	Interisland Airlines	TRI-BIRD	Philippines	
	IWY	Interisland Airways]	ISLANDWAYS	Turks and Caicos Islands	Name changed to Air Turks & Caicos, then InterCaribbean Airways
4O	AIJ	Interjet	ABC AEROLINEAS	Mexico	defunct
	IHE	Interjet Helicopters	INTERCOPTER	Greece	
	IJW	Interjet Inc.	JET WEST	United States	2015
ID	ITK	Interlink Airlines	INTERLINK	South Africa	
	IAK	International Air Cargo Corporation	AIR CARGO EGYPT	Egypt	
	EXX	International Air Corporation	EXPRESS INTERNATIONAL	United States	
N/A	NCC	T3 Aviation, Inc.	STARFLEET	United States	2020
	IAX	International Air Services	INTERAIR SERVICES	Liberia	
	IBY	International Business Aircraft	CENTRAL STAGE	United States	
	ICS	International Charter Services	INTERSERVI	Mexico	
	ICX	International Charter Xpress	INTEX	United States	Defunct 1994
	RED	International Committee of the Red Cross	RED CROSS	Switzerland	
	IIG	International Company for Transport, Trade and Public Works	ALDAWLYH AIR	Libya	
	IFX	International Flight Training Academy	IFTA	United States	
	IJA	International Jet Aviation Services	I-JET	United States	
	HSP	International Jet Charter	HOSPITAL	United States	The Flying Hospital
	THN	International Security Assistance Force	ATHENA	Canada	
	RSQ	International SOS Windhoek	SKYMEDIC	Namibia	
	ISF	International Stabilisation Assistance Force		United Kingdom	
	ITH	International Trans-Air	INTRANS NIGERIA	Nigeria	
	IPT	Interport Corporation	INTERPORT	United States	
	IKY	Intersky Bulgary	GENERAL SKY	Bulgaria	
3L	ISK	Intersky	INTERSKY	Austria	Defunct
I4	FWA	Interstate Airlines	FREEWAYAIR	Netherlands	Defunct
	ITU	Intervuelos	INTERLOS	Mexico	
	INV	Inversija	INVER	Latvia	
	IND	Iona National Airways	IONA	Ireland	
	IOA	Iowa Airways	IOWA AIR	United States	
IR	IRA	Iran Air	IRANAIR	Iran	
EP	IRC	Iran Aseman Airlines	ASEMAN	Iran	
B9	IRB	Iran Airtour	AIRTOUR	Iran	
	IRG	Iranian Naft Airlines	NAFT	Iran	
IA	IAW	Iraqi Airways	IRAQI	Iraq	
	BIS	Irbis Air	IRBIS	Kazakhstan	
	IRL	Irish Air Corps	IRISH	Ireland	
	RDK	Irish Air Transport	IRISH TRANS	Ireland	
	XMR	Irish Aviation Authority	AUTHORITY	Ireland	
IH	MZA	Irtysh Air	IRTYSH AIRLINES	Kazakhstan	Old IATA code: IT; old ICAO code: IRT
	KCE	Irving Oil	KACEY	Canada	
	ISI	Island Air	ISLANDMEX	Mexico	
	ILF	Island Air Charters	ISLAND FLIGHT	United States	
	XYZ	Island Air Express	RAINBIRD	United States	
	ISA	Island Airlines		United States	
	SOY	Island Aviation	SORIANO	Philippines	
	DQA	Island Aviation Services		Maldives	
	IOM	Island Aviation and Travel	ISLE AVIA	United Kingdom	
2S	SDY	Island Express	SANDY ISLE	United States	
	MTP	Island Helicopters	METROCOPTER	United States	
	ILC	ILAS Air		Japan	
	IAJ	Islandair Jersey	JARLAND	United Kingdom	
CN		Islands Nationair		Papua New Guinea	
	ICB	Icebird Airline	ICEBIRD	Iceland	
IF	ISW	Islas Airways	PINTADERA	Spain	
	IGS	Isle Grande Flying School	ISLA GRANDE	United States	
WC	ISV	Islena De Inversiones		Honduras	
	IOS	Isles of Scilly Skybus	SCILLONIA	United Kingdom	
	IAI	Israel Aircraft Industries	ISRAEL AIRCRAFT	Israel	
	IAF	Israeli Air Force		Israel	
6H	ISR	Israir	ISRAIR	Israel	
	IST	Istanbul Airlines	ISTANBUL	Turkey	
AZ	ITY	ITA Airways	ITARROW	Italy	
FS	ACL	Itali Airlines	SPADA	Italy	Former name: Transporti Aerei Italiani; former IATA Code: 9X*; former ICAO code: ACO
	IAM	Italian Air Force	ITALIAN AIRFORCE	Italy	
	IEI	Italian Army	ITALIAN ARMY	Italy	
	GCI	Italian Coast Guard	ITALIAN COAST GUARD	Italy	
	MMI	Italian Navy	ITALIAN NAVY	Italy	
	IFS	Italy First	RIVIERA	Italy	
GI	IKA	Itek Air	ITEK-AIR	Kyrgyzstan	?ICAO confirmed; IATA not
	IVS	Ivoire Aero Services	IVOIRE AERO	Ivory Coast	
	IVW	Ivoire Airways	IVOIRAIRWAYS	Ivory Coast	
	IJE	Ivoire Jet Express	IVOIRE JET	Ivory Coast	
	OIC	Iwamoto Crane Co Ltd		Japan	
	IXR	Ixair	X-BIRD	France	
H9	IZM	Izair	IZMIR	Turkey	
	IZA	Izhavia	IZHAVIA	Russia	
	JTN		JET TEST	United States	
	JGJ	Jinggong Jet	GLOBAL JINGGONG	China	2014, 2023
	JNY	Journey Aviation	ROCKBAND	United States	2023: Callsign "ROCKBAND"; Former Call Sign/Telephony Designator: UNIJET-ROCKBAND (2014)
	JKR	Justice Air Charter	JOKER	United States	Trading name for Reliant Aviation, allocated in 2014
	JWD	Jayawijaya Dirgantara		Indonesia	
	JCB	JCB (heavy equipment manufacturer)	JAYSEEBEE	United Kingdom	
	RFX	J P Hunt Air Carriers	REFLEX	United States	J P Hunt Air Carriers
XM		J-Air	J AIR	Japan	
JC	JEX	JAL Express	JANEX	Japan	
JO	JAZ	JALways	JALWAYS	Japan	
	JDA	JDAviation	JAY DEE	United Kingdom	
	JDP	JDP Lux	RED PELICAN	Luxembourg	
	JHM	JHM Cargo Expreso		Costa Rica	
	TQM	JM Family Aviation	TACOMA	United States	
MT	JMC	JMC Airlines	JAYEMMSEE	United Kingdom	
1M		JSC Transport Automated Information Systems		Russia	
	JSJ	JS Air	JS CHARTER	Pakistan	
	JES	JS Aviation	JAY-ESS AVIATION	Mexico	
	JCK	Jackson Air Services	JACKSON	Canada	
JI	JAE	Jade Cargo International	JADE CARGO	China	defunct
	JAW	Jamahiriya Airways	JAW	Libya	
	JMB	Jambo Africa Airlines	JAMBOAFRICA	Democratic Republic of Congo	
	WWW	Janet	JANET	United States	de facto name
	FJX	Jet Sky Cargo and Air Charter		Kenya	
	JAK	Jana-Arka	YANZAR	Kazakhstan	
	JAX	Janair	JANAIR	United States	
3X	JAC	Japan Air Commuter	COMMUTER	Japan	
	JSV	Japan Aircraft Service		Japan	
JL	JAL	Japan Airlines	JAPANAIR	Japan	Japan Airlines International
JL	JFL	Japan Airlines Domestic	J-BIRD	Japan	defunct
EG	JAA	Japan Asia Airways	ASIA	Japan	defunct
NU	JTA	Japan Transocean Air	JAI OCEAN	Japan	
JA	JAT	JetSmart	ROCKSMART	Chile	
JZ	JAP	JetSMART Perú	RED SMART	Peru	
WJ	JES	JetSMART Argentina	SMARTBIRD	Argentina	
JU	JAT	Jat Airways	JAT	Serbia	
VJ	JTY	Jatayu Airlines	JATAYU	Indonesia	
J9	JZR	Jazeera Airways	JAZEERA	Kuwait	
7C	JJA	Jeju Air	JEJU AIR	Republic of Korea	
	JNY	Jenney Beechcraft	JENAIR	United States	
	XLD	Jeppesen Data Plan		United States	
	JPN	Jeppesen UK	JETPLAN	United Kingdom	
O2	JEA	OLT Express	JETA	Poland	defunct, funded by acquisition of Jet Air and YES Airways
	JSI	Jet Air Group	SISTEMA	Russia	JSC
9W	JAI	Jet Airways	JET AIRWAYS	India	
QJ		Jet Airways		United States	
	JTX	Jet Aspen Air Lines	JET ASPEN	United States	
PP	PJS	Jet Aviation	JETAVIATION	Switzerland	
	BZF	Jet Aviation Business Jets	BIZFLEET	United States	
	JAS	Jet Aviation Flight Services	JET SETTER	United States	
	JCF	Jet Center Flight Training	JET CENTER	Spain	
	JCT	Jet Charter	JET CHARTER	United States	
	JCX	Jet Connection	JET CONNECT	Germany	defunct
	DWW	Jet Courier Service	DON JUAN	United States	
	JED	Jet East International	JET EAST	United States	defunct
	JEI	Jet Executive International Charter	JET EXECUTIVE	Germany	
	RZA	Jet Fighter Flights	RAZOR	Australia	
	CFT	Jet Freighters	CASPER FREIGHT	United States	
	JGD	Jet G&D Aviation	JET GEE-AND-DEE	Israel	
	MJL	Jet Line International	MOLDJET	Moldova	
	JEK	Jet Link	JET OPS	Israel	
	HTL	Jet Linx Aviation	HEARTLAND	United States	
	JTL	Jet Linx Aviation	JET LINX	United States	
	JNR	Jet Norte	JET NORTE	Mexico	
	JRN	Jet Rent	JET RENT	Mexico	
	JDI	Jet Story	JEDI	Poland	Formerly: Jet Service
3K	JSA	Jetstar Asia	JETSTAR ASIA	Singapore	
	JDI	Jet Story	JEDI	Poland	former Blue Jet
	JSM	Jet Stream	JET STREAM	Moldova	
	VTB	Jet Stream Charter KFT.	SUXAIR	Hungary	2023
	JSS	Jet Stream International		Pakistan	2023
	JTF	Jet Time	JETFIN	Finland	2014, 2023
	JTC	Jet Trans Aviation	JETRANS	Ghana	
	JTT	Jet-2000	MOSCOW JET	Russia	
	OPS	Jet-Ops	OPS-JET	United Arab Emirates	
	JSH	Jet-stream	STREAM AIR	Hungary	
LS	EXS	Jet2.com	CHANNEX	United Kingdom	Formerly Channel Express
	JFU	Jet4You	ARGAN	Morocco	
	OSW	JetAfrica Eswatini	BEVO	Swaziland	
B6	JBU	JetBlue Airways	JETBLUE	United States	
	JMG	JetMagic	JET MAGIC	Ireland	Defunct
	JMK	Jetmagic		Malta	Defunct, Not Many Flights
JF	JAA	Jet Asia Airways	JET ASIA	Thailand	
	JAF	Jetairfly	BEAUTY	Belgium	
	JTL	Jetall Holdings	FIREFLY	Canada	
	JAG	Jetalliance	JETALLIANCE	Austria	
0J	JCS	Jetclub	JETCLUB	Switzerland	
	QNZ	Jetconnect	QANTAS JETCONNECT	New Zealand	
	UEJ	Jetcorp	JETCORP	United States	(United Executive Jet)
	JCC	Jetcraft Aviation	JETCRAFT	Australia	
	JXA	Jetex Aviation		Lebanon	
	JEF	Jetflite	JETFLITE	Finland	
	JFL	Jetfly Airlines	LINEFLYER	Austria	
	JFA	Jetfly Aviation	MOSQUITO	Luxembourg	
	JIC	Jetgo International	JIC-JET	Thailand	
	JLX	Jetlink Express	KEN JET	Kenya	
	JLH	Jetlink Holland		Netherlands	Defunct, ICAO code in use by another company
	JNL	JetNetherlands	JETNETHERLANDS	Netherlands	
	JNV	Jetnova de Aviación Ejecutiva	JETNOVA	Spain	
	JPO	Jetpro	JETPRO	Mexico	
	MDJ	Jetran Air	JETRAN AIR	Romania	
	JRI	Jetrider International	JETRIDER	United Kingdom	
	JEJ	Jets Ejecutivos	MEXJETS	Mexico	
	JEP	Jets Personales	JET PERSONALES	Spain	
	JSE	Jets Y Servicios Ejecutivos	SERVIJETS	Mexico	
SG	JGO	JetsGo	JETSGO	Canada	defunct
JQ	JST	Jetstar	JETSTAR	Australia	
GK	JJP	Jetstar Japan	ORANGE LINER	Japan	
JM	JKT	Jetstar Hong Kong	KAITAK	China	
	JXT	Jetstream Executive Travel	VANNIN	United Kingdom	
	RSP	JetSuite	REDSTRIPE	United States	
	JPQ	Jett Paqueteria	JETT PAQUETERIA	Mexico	
JX	JEC	Jett8 Airlines Cargo	TAIPAN	Singapore	defunct
JO	JTD	Jettime	JETTIME	Denmark	
	JTN	Jet Test Intl.	JET TEST	United States	
	JWY	Jetways of Iowa	JETWAYS	United States	
GX	JXX	JetX Airlines	JETBIRD	Iceland	
	JIB	Jibair	JIBAIRLINE	Djibouti	
	JSW	Jigsaw Project	JIGSAW	United Kingdom	Bristow Helicopters
	HKN	Jim Hankins Air Service	HANKINS	United States	
	RAS	Jim Ratliff Air Service	SHANHIL	United States	
LJ	JNA	Jin Air	JIN AIR	South Korea	
	JDG	Joanas Avialinijos	LADYBLUE	Lithuania	
	JBR	Job Air	JOBAIR	Czech Republic	
	JHN	Johnson Air	AIR JOHNSON	United States	
	JON	Johnsons Air	JOHNSONSAIR	Ghana	
	JMJ	Johnston Airways	JOHNSTON	United States	
	JMM	Joint Military Commission	JOICOMAR	Sudan	
	JMT	Jomartaxi Aereo	JOMARTAXI	Mexico	
	ODI	Jonsson, H Air Taxi	ODINN	Iceland	
R5	JAV	Jordan Aviation	JORDAN AVIATION	Jordan	
J4	JCI	Jordan International Air Cargo		Jordan	
	JVK	Jorvik	ISLANDIC	Iceland	
	ENZ	Jota Aviation	ENZO	United Kingdom	
	JNJ	Journey Jet	JOURNEY JET	Thailand	
XE	JSX	JSX (airline)	BIGSTRIPE	United States	
	JUR	Ju-Air	JUNKERS	Switzerland	
	JFS	Juanda Flying School	JAEMCO	Indonesia	
	JUC	Juba Cargo Services & Aviation Company	JUBA CARGO	Sudan	
6J	JUB	Jubba Airways	JUBBA	Somalia	
	DKE	Jubilee Airways	DUKE	United Kingdom	
HO	DKH	Juneyao Airlines	AIR JUNEYAO	China	2023
	JSY	Jung Sky		Croatia	
	MEY	Justair Scandinavia	MELODY	Sweden	
	DOJ	Justice Prisoner Air Transportation System	JUSTICE	United States	
OH	JIA	PSA Airlines	BLUE STREAK	United States	
	KTA	K2 Airways		Pakistan	
	KSA	K S Avia	SKY CAMEL	Latvia	
	KCR	Kolob Canyons Air Services	KOLOB	United States	
KW	KHK	Kharkiv Airlines	SUNRAY	Ukraine	
	KGZ	Kyrgyz Airlines	BERMET	Kyrgyzstan	
	KDC	K D Air Corporation	KAY DEE	Canada	
	KMI	K-Mile Air	KAY-MILE AIR	Thailand	
KD	KLS	Kalstar Aviation	KALSTAR	Indonesia	
KD	KNI	KD Avia	KALININGRAD AIR	Russia	
WA	KLC	KLM Cityhopper	CITY	Netherlands	
	KLH	KLM Helicopter	KLM HELI	Netherlands	
KL	KLM	KLM	KLM	Netherlands	
N2	QNK	Kabo Air	KABO	Nigeria	
	KMC	Kahama Mining Corporation	KAHAMA	Tanzania	
KI	KAI	KaiserAir	KAISER	United States	Operates B737-500, B737-700, B737-800
K4	CKS	Kalitta Air	CONNIE	United States	Operates B747-400's, B767-300ER's, B777F.
K9*	KFS	Kalitta Charters	KALITTA	United States	Operates Lear 25s, 35s, 36s Falcon 20s, CL601
K5*	KII	Kalitta Charters II	DRAGSTER	United States	Operates B727-200's, DC9-15 & 30, B737-400's. Owner Doug Kalitta is an NHRA Top Fuel champion.
	KES	Kallat El Saker Air Company	KALLAT EL SKER	Libya	
RQ	KMF	Kam Air	KAMGAR	Afghanistan	
E2	KMP	Kampuchea Airlines	KAMPUCHEA	Cambodia	IATA was KT
	KIZ	Kanaf-Arkia Airlines		Israel	
	KHE	Kanfey Ha'emek Aviation	KANFEY HAEMEK	Israel	
	KSU	Kansas State University	K-STATE	United States	
V2	AKT	Karat	AVIAKARAT	Russia	
	KRB	Karibu Airways Company	KARIBU AIR	Tanzania	
	KLG	Karlog Air Charter	KARLOG	Denmark	defunct
	KAJ	Karthago Airlines	KARTHAGO	Tunisia	
	KAE	Kartika Airlines	KARTIKA	Indonesia	
	KTV	Kata Transportation	KATAVIA	Sudan	
	KTK	Katekavia	KATEKAVIA	Russia	
	KAT	Kato Airline	KATO-AIR	Norway	
KV	MVD	Kavminvodyavia	AIR MINVODY	Russia	
	XKA	Kavouras Inc		United States	
	KRN	Kaz Agros Avia	ANTOL	Kazakhstan	
	KAW	Kaz Air West	KAZWEST	Kazakhstan	
	KAO	Kazan Aviation Production Association	KAZAVAIA	Russia	
	KPH	Kazan Helicopters	KAMA	Russia	
	KKA	Kazavia	KAKAIR	Kazakhstan	
	KZS	Kazaviaspas	SPAKAZ	Kazakhstan	
3Q	KCH	KC International Airlines	CAM AIR	Cambodia	
	JFK	Keenair Charter -	KEENAIR	United Kingdom	
	KLX	Kelix Air	KELIX	Nigeria	
	FKL	Kelner Airways	KELNER	Canada	
KW	KFA	Kelowna Flightcraft Air Charter	FLIGHTCRAFT	Canada	
	KDA	Kendell Airlines	KENDELL	Australia	defunct
M5	KEN	Kenmore Air	KENMORE	United States	
	KBA	Kenn Borek Air	BOREK AIR	Canada	
	KAH	Kent Aviation	DEKAIR	Canada	
KQ	KQA	Kenya Airways	KENYA	Kenya	
	KVS	Kevis	KEVIS	Kazakhstan	
ZN	KEY	Key Airlines	KEY AIR	United States	
KG	LYM	Key Lime Air	KEY LIME	United States	
	FTP	Keystone Aerial Surveys	FOOTPRINT	United States	
BZ	KEE	Keystone Air Service	KEYSTONE	Canada	
K6	KZW	Khalifa Airways	KHALIFA AIR	Algeria	
	WKH	Kharkov Aircraft Manufacturing Company	WEST-KHARKOV	Ukraine	
	KHR	Khazar	KHAZAR	Turkmenistan	
	KHP	Khoezestan Photros Air Lines	PHOTROS AIR	Iran	
	KRV	Khoriv-Avia	KHORIV-AVIA	Ukraine	
X9 KO	KHO	Khors Aircompany	AIRCOMPANY KHORS	Ukraine	defunct
	KHY	Khyber Afghan Airlines	KHYBER	Afghanistan	
	UAK	Kiev Aviation Plant	AVIATION PLANT	Ukraine	
	KNG	King Aviation	KING	United Kingdom	
	BEZ	Kingfisher Air Services	SEA BREEZE	United States	
IT	KFR	Kingfisher Airlines	KINGFISHER	India	Defunct Since 2012 IATA Code transferred to Tigerair Taiwan
4I	KNX	Knighthawk Air Express	KNIGHT FLIGHT	Canada	
	KAS	Kingston Air Services	KINGSTON AIR	Canada	
	KIP	Kinnarps	KINNARPS	Sweden	
	KNS	Kinshasa Airways	KINSHASA AIRWAYS	Democratic Republic of the Congo	defunct
	KTA	Kirov Air Enterprise	VYATKA-AVIA	Russia	
Y9	IRK	Kish Air	KISHAIR	Iran	
KR	KHA	Kitty Hawk Aircargo	AIR KITTYHAWK	United States	defunct
2K	KHC	Kitty Hawk Airways	CARGO HAWK	United States	defunct
KP	KIA	Kiwi International Air Lines	KIWI AIR	United States	
	KRA	Kiwi Regional Airlines	REGIONAL	New Zealand	
KY	KNA	Kunming Airlines	KUNMING AIR	China	ICAO code KNA was used by Knight Air
	KHX	Knighthawk Express	RIZZ	United States	
	KGT	Knights Airlines	KNIGHT-LINER	Nigeria	
	KOA	Koanda Avacion	KOANDA	Spain	
	OYE	Koda International	KODA AIR	Nigeria	
7K	KGL	Kogalymavia Air Company	KOGALYM	Russia	
	KOM	Kom Activity	COMJET	Netherlands	
	KMA	Komiaviatrans State Air Enterprise	KOMI AVIA	Russia	
8J	KMV	Komiinteravia	KOMIINTER	Russia	
	KNM	Komsomolsk-on-Amur Air Enterprise	KNAAPO	Russia	
	KOB	Koob-Corp - 96 KFT	AUTOFLEX	Hungary	
KE	KAL	Korean Air	KOREANAIR	South Korea	
	KMG	Kosmas Air	KOSMAS CARGO	Serbia	
	KSM	Kosmos	KOSMOS	Russia	
	KOS	Kosova Airlines	KOSOVA	Serbia	
	WOK	Kovar Air	WOKAIR	Czech Republic	
7B	KJC	Krasnojarsky Airlines	KRASNOJARSKY AIR	Russia	defunct
	KFC	Kremenchuk Flight College	KREMENCHUK	Ukraine	
	KRG	Krimaviamontag	AVIAMONTAG	Ukraine	
	KRO	Kroonk Air Agency	KROONK	Ukraine	
K9	KRI	Krylo Airlines	Krylo	Russia	
	KYM	Krym	CRIMEA AIR	Ukraine	
	OPC	Krystel Air Charter	OPTIC	United Kingdom	
GW	KIL	Kuban Airlines	AIR KUBAN	Russia	
VD	KPA	Kunpeng Airlines	KUNPENG	China	
	KZA	Kurzemes Avio		Russia	
	KBV	Kustbevakningen	SWECOAST	Sweden	
KU	KAC	Kuwait Airways	KUWAITI	Kuwait	
GO	KZU	Kuzu Airlines Cargo	KUZU CARGO	Turkey	
	QVR	Kvadro Aero	PEGASO	Kyrgyzstan	
	KWN	Kwena Air	KWENA	South Africa	
N5	KGZ	Kyrgyz Airlines	BERMET	Kyrgyzstan	
	KTC	Kyrgyz Trans Avia	DINARA	Kyrgyzstan	
QH	LYN	Kyrgyzstan	ALTYN AVIA	Kyrgyzstan	Name changed to Air Kyrgyzstan
R8	KGA	Kyrgyzstan Airlines	KYRGYZ	Kyrgyzstan	
	DAM	Kyrgyzstan Department of Aviation	FLIGHT RESCUE	Kyrgyzstan	under the Ministry of Emergency Situation
	KGB	Kyrgz General Aviation	KEMIN	Kyrgyzstan	
FK	KEW	Keewatin Air	BLIZZARD	Canada	
JS	KOR	Air Koryo	AIR KORYO	North Korea	
	AOE	Livingstone Executive	LIVINGSTONE AIR	Italy	
	LZF	Lease Fly	SKYLEASE	Portugal	
	LHB	Liebherr Geschaeftreiseflugzeug	FAMILY	Germany	
	LLD	Lloyd Aviation		Venezuela	
	LGA	Logistic Air	LOGAIR	Malaysia	
	LGC	Legacy Air	LEGACY AIR	Thailand	
	LTY	Liberty Air	SKYDECK	Netherlands	
	LWL	Lowlevel	CUB DRIVER	Portugal	
	LAX	Laminar Air		Spain	
YL	LWA	Libyan Wings	LIBYAN WINGS	Libya	
YQ	LCT	TAR Aerolineas	TAR	Mexico	
	LAH	L A Helicopter	STAR SHIP	United States	
	LJY	L J Aviation	ELJAY	United States	
	LRB	L R Airlines	LADY RACINE	Czech Republic	
	PHO	L&L Flygbildteknik	PHOTOFLIGHT	Sweden	
	LEX	L'Express Airlines	LEX	United States	
	FNT	L-3 Communications Flight International Aviation	FLIGHT INTERNATIONAL	United States	
JF	LAB	L.A.B. Flying Service	LAB	United States	
LR	LRC	LACSA	LACSA	Costa Rica	
	LDE	LADE - Líneas Aéreas Del Estado	LADE	Argentina	
KG	BNX	LAI - Línea Aérea IAACA	AIR BARINAS	Venezuela	
	LNC	LAN Dominicana	LANCANA	Dominican Republic	
4M	DSM	LATAM Argentina	LAN AR	Argentina	Ceased operations in 2020
JJ	TAM	LATAM Brasil	TAM	Brazil	
UC	LCO	LATAM Cargo Chile	LAN CARGO	Chile	
LA	LAN	LATAM Chile	LAN CHILE	Chile	
4C	ARE	LATAM Colombia	LAN COLOMBIA	Colombia	
XL	LNE	LATAM Airlines Ecuador	AEROLANE	Ecuador	Líneas Aéreas Nacionales Del Ecuador
LU	LXP	LATAM Express	LANEX	Chile	
PZ	LAP	LATAM Paraguay	PARAGUAYA	Paraguay	
LP	LPE	LATAM Peru	LANPERU	Peru	
NI		LANICA		Nicaragua	
	LSA	LANSA	INTERNACIONAL	Dominican Republic	
	APT	LAP Colombia - Líneas Aéreas Petroleras, S.A.	LAP	Colombia	
	LCB	LC Busre	BUSRE	Peru	
L5		Línea Aérea Cuencana		Ecuador	
LO	LOT	LOT Polish Airlines	POLLOT	Poland	"POLLOT" is not used in practice. "LOT" is used in almost all cases.
	JKA	LeTourneau University	JACKET	United States	
XO	LTE	LTE International Airways	FUN JET	Spain	
L3	LTO	LTU Austria	BILLA TRANSPORT	Austria	
LT	LTU	LTU International	LTU	Germany	
	JFC	LTV Jet Fleet Corporation	JET-FLEET	United States	
	LUK	LUKoil-Avia	LUKOIL	Russia	
	ASK	La Ronge Aviation Services	AIR SASK	Canada	
	LVT	La Valenciana Taxi Aéreo	TAXIVALENCIANA	Mexico	
	SKQ	Labcorp	SKYLAB	United States	
	LAL	Labrador Airways	LAB AIR	Canada	
N6	JEV	Lagun Air		Spain	
	HCA	Lake Havasu Air Service	HAVASU	United States	
	LKL	Lakeland Aviation	LAKELAND	United States	
	LKR	Laker Airways	LAKER	United States	
	LBH	Laker Airways (Bahamas)	LAKER BAHAMAS	United States	
	LMR	Lamra	LAMAIR	Sudan	
	TCR	Lanaes Aereas Trans Costa Rica	TICOS	Costa Rica	
	ISL	Landsflug	ISLANDIA	Iceland	
	PAP	Langtry Flying Group	PROFLIGHT	United Kingdom	
IK	LKN	Lankair	Lankair	Sri Lanka	
QL	RLN	Lankan Cargo	AERO LANKA	Sri Lanka	
	LZA	Lanza Air	AEROLANZA	Spain	
	LZT	Lanzarote Aerocargo	BARAKA	Spain	
QV	LAO	Lao Airlines	LAO	Lao People's Democratic Republic	
	LKA	Lao Central Airlines	NAKLAO	Lao People's Democratic Republic	Ceased operations in 2014
	LLL	Lao Skyway	LAVIE	Lao People's Democratic Republic	
	LXW	Lanexang Airways International	LANEXANG	Lao People's Democratic Republic	
L7	LPN	Laoag International Airlines	LAOAG AIR	Philippines	
	LRD	Laredo Air	LAREDO AIR	United States	
	OTN	LASTP	LASTP	São Tomé and Príncipe	
	LTC	LatCharter	LATCHARTER	Latvia	defunct
	LAF	Latvian Air Force	LATVIAN AIRFORCE	Latvia	
NG	LDA	Lauda Air	LAUDA AIR	Austria	
OE	LDM	LaudaMotion	LAUDA MOTION	Austria	
	LDI	Lauda Air Italy	LAUDA ITALY	Italy	
	LEP	Laughlin Express	LAUGHLIN EXPRESS	United States	
	LSU	Laus	LAUS AIR	Croatia	
	LAR	Lawrence Aviation	LAWRENCE	United States	
	LAY	Layang-Layang Aerospace	LAYANG	Malaysia	
	LPL	Lease-a-Plane International	LEASE-A-PLANE	United States	
LQ	LAQ	Lebanese Air Transport	LAT	Lebanon	
	LAT	Lebanese Air Transport (charter)	LEBANESE AIR	Lebanon	
	LAD	Lebanon Airport Development Corporation	LADCO-AIR	United States	
	LEB	Lebap	LEBAP	Turkmenistan	
	LCA	Leconte Airlines	LECONTE	United States	
LI	LIA	Leeward Islands Air Transport	LIAT	Antigua and Barbuda	
	LGD	Legend Airlines	LEGENDARY	United States	
	LWD	Leisure Air	LEISURE WORLD	United States	
	LEN	Lentini Aviation	LENTINI	United States	
	LOR	Leo-Air	LEO CHARTER	South Africa	
	LEL	Leonsa De Aviación	LEONAVIA	Spain	
LL	LVL	Level	LEVEL	Spain	
	LYW	Libyan Airlines	LIBYAN AIRWAYS	Libya	
LN	LAA	Libyan Arab Airlines	LIBAIR	Libya	
	LCR	Libyan Arab Air Cargo	LIBAC	Libya	
	LIQ	Lid Air		Sweden	
	LTA	LIFT Academy	LIFT	United States	
	LCG	Lignes Aeriennes Congolaises	CONGOLAISE	Democratic Republic of the Congo	
	LKD	Lignes Aeriennes Du Tchad	LATCHAD	Chad	
	LME	Lignes Mauritaniennes Air Express	LIMAIR EXPRESS	Mauritania	
	GCB	Lignes Nationales Aeriennes - Linacongo	LINACONGO	Republic of the Congo	
	GDQ	Lincoln Air National Guard		United States	
	LRT	Lincoln Airlines		Australia	
	LSY	Lindsay Aviation	LINDSAY AIR	United States	
	NOT	Línea Aérea Costa Norte	COSTA NORTE	Chile	
	LMC	Línea Aérea Mexicana de Carga	LINEAS DECARGA	Mexico	
L7	LNP	Línea Aérea SAPSA	SAPSA	Chile	
	NEG	Línea Aérea de Fumig Aguas Negras	AGUAS NEGRAS	Chile	
QL	LER	Línea Aérea de Servicio Ejecutivo Regional	LASER	Venezuela	
	LSE	Línea De Aeroservicios		Chile	
	TUY	Línea Turística Aereotuy	AEREOTUY	Venezuela	
	ALR	Líneas Aéreas Alaire S.L.	AEROLAIRE	Spain	
ZE	LCD	Líneas Aéreas Azteca	LINEAS AZTECA	Mexico	defunct
	LCN	Líneas Aéreas Canedo LAC	CANEDO	Bolivia	
	LCM	Líneas Aéreas Comerciales	LINEAS COMERCIALES	Mexico	
	EDD	Líneas Aéreas Ejectuivas De Durango	LINEAS DURANGO	Mexico	
	EDR	Líneas Aéreas Eldorado	ELDORADRO	Colombia	
	FED	Líneas Aéreas Federales	FEDERALES	Argentina	
	LMN	Líneas Aéreas Monarca	LINEAS MONARCA	Mexico	
	LIJ	Líneas Aéreas San Jose	LINEAS JOSE	Mexico	
	UMA	Líneas Aéreas del Humaya	HUMAYA	Mexico	
	LEC	Linex	LECA	Central African Republic	
	SMS	Linhas Aéreas Santomenses	SANTOMENSES	São Tomé and Príncipe	
TM	LAM	Linhas Aéreas de Moçambique	MOZAMBIQUE	Mozambique	
	LAW	Link Airways of Australia		Australia	
	WGT	Volkswagen AirService GmbH	WORLDGATE	United Kingdom	
JT	LNI	Lion Air	LION INTER	Indonesia	
	LEU	Lions-Air	LIONSAIR	Switzerland	
	LYF	Lithuanian Air Force	LITHUANIAN AIRFORCE	Lithuania	safety department
	LRA	Little Red Air Service	LITTLE RED	Canada	
LM	LVG	Livingston Energy Flight	LIVINGSTON	Italy	Ceased operations 2010
LT	SNG	LJ Air	SNOW EAGLE	China	
LB	LLB	Lloyd Aéreo Boliviano	LLOYDAEREO	Bolivia	
	LNA	Lnair Air Services	ELNAIR	Spain	
	XLG	Lockheed Air Terminal		United States	
	LAC	Lockeed Aircraft Corporation	LOCKHEED	United States	
	XDD	Lockheed DUATS		United States	
	CBD	Lockheed Martin Aeronautics	CATBIRD	United States	
	LNG	Lockheed Martin Aeronautics Company	LIGHTNING	United States	
LM	LOG	Loganair	LOGAN	United Kingdom	Gained the code LM after beginning independent operations (2017)
	CLV	Lom Praha Flying School	AEROTRAINING	Czech Republic	
	LMS	Lomas Helicopters	LOMAS	United Kingdom	
	LCY	London City Airport Jet Centre	LONDON CITY	United Kingdom	
	LNX	London Executive Aviation	LONEX	United Kingdom	
	LOV	London Flight Centre (Stansted)	LOVEAIR	United Kingdom	
	LHC	London Helicopter Centres	MUSTANG	United Kingdom	
	LSS	Lone Star Airlines	LONE STAR	United States	
	ORA	Long Island Airlines	LONG ISLAND	United States	
GI	LHA	Longhao Airlines	AIR CANTON	China	
	LGT	Longtail Aviation	LONGTAIL	Bermuda	
GJ	CDC	Loong Air	LOONG AIR	China	
	LRR	Lorraine Aviation	LORRAINE	France	
	LSC	Los Cedros Aviación	CEDROS	Chile	
	TAS	Lotus Air	LOTUS FLOWER	Egypt	
	LTW	Luchtvaartmaatschappij Twente	TWENTAIR	Netherlands	
8L	LKE	Lucky Air	LUCKY AIR	China	
	LUT	Luft Carago	LUGO	South Africa	
	LVD	Luftfahrt-Vermietungs-Dienst	AIR SANTE	Austria	
LH	DLH	Lufthansa	LUFTHANSA	Germany	
LH	GEC	Lufthansa Cargo	LUFTHANSA CARGO	Germany	
CL	CLH	Lufthansa CityLine	HANSALINE	Germany	
L1		Lufthansa Systems		Germany	
	LHT	Lufthansa Technik	LUFTHANSA TECHNIK	Germany	
	LTF	Lufttaxi Fluggesellschaft	Garfield	Germany	
L5	LTR	Lufttransport	LUFT TRANSPORT	Norway	
	LHS	Luhansk	ENTERPRISE LUHANSK	Ukraine	
	UNY	Lund University School of Aviation	UNIVERSITY	Sweden	
LG	LGL	Luxair	LUXAIR	Luxembourg	
	LXA	Luxaviation	RED LION	Luxembourg	
	LUV	Luxembourg Air Rescue	LUX RESCUE	Luxembourg	
	LFE	Luxflight Executive	LUX EXPRESS	Luxembourg	
	LXO	Luxor Air		Egypt	
	LUZ	Luzair	LISBON JET	Portugal	
5V	UKW	Lviv Airlines	UKRAINE WEST	Ukraine	
	LYD	Lydd Air	LYDDAIR	United Kingdom	
	LCH	Lynch Flying Service	LYNCH AIR	United States	
L2	LYC	Lynden Air Cargo	LYNDEN	United States	
BN	LWG	Luxwing	LUXWING	Malta	
Y9	DAT	Lynx Air	DAUNTLESS	Canada	
	LXF	Lynx Air International	LYNX FLIGHT	United States	
L4	SSX	Lynx Aviation	SHASTA	United States	Part of Frontier Airlines
	LYX	Lynx Aviation	LYNX AIR	Pakistan	
Z8	AZN	Línea Aérea Amaszonas		Bolivia	
MJ	LPR	Líneas Aéreas Privadas Argentinas	LAPA	Argentina	defunct
	LAU	Líneas Aéreas Suramericanas	SURAMERICANO	Colombia	
LT	SNG	LongJiang Airlines	SNOW EAGLE	China	
	LYB	Lynden Air Cargo	HIGHLANDS	Papua New Guinea	
Q2	DQA	Maldivian	ISLAND AVIATION	Maldives	
	MMH	McMahon Helicopter	NIGHT RIDER	United States	2015
	HOG	Mahogany Air Charters	HOGAN AIR	Zambia	2014
	MTS	Med Jets	MED SERVICE	Mexico	2014
	MSF	Minsheng International Jet	MEINSHENG	China	2014
	MXS	Millon Express	MILLON EXPRESS	United States	Trading name for Sunrise Airlines allocated in 2014
	MHF	Maritime Helicopters	AIR MARITIME	United States	Allocated 2014
BF	MRK	MarkAir	MARKAIR	United States	1984-1995
WD	MWM	Modern Transporte Aereo De Carga	MODERNAIR	Brazil	
	MSJ	Magnum Air	MAGNUM AIR	Philippines	
	MWI	Malawian Airlines 2014	MALAWIAN	Malawi	
	MYP	Mann Yadanarpon Airlines	MANN ROYAL	Myanmar	
NR	MAV	Manta Air	SEA WING	Maldives	
	RDK	Memorial Hermann Hospital System	RED DUKE	United States	Houston, Texas
	MLV	Multiservicios Aereos Del Valle	MULTI VALLE	Mexico	
	MMJ	Macau Jet International	MACAUJET	China	
	MXF	Maximum Flight Advantages	MAXFLIGHT	United States	
OD	MXD	Malindo Airways	MALINDO EXPRESS	Malaysia	
	MJC	Mandarin Air	AIR MANDA	China	
	PLG	MBK-S	PILGRIM	Russia	
	DZR	Midwest Aviation	DOZER	United States	
	MSN	Milenium Air Servicios Aereos Integrados		Mexico	
	MFB	Mountain Flyers 80	MOUNTAINHELI	Switzerland	
	HTL	My Fair Jet	HOTLINE	Austria	
	JNH	M & N Aviation	JONAH	United States	
	MCF	MAC Fotografica	MAC FOTO	Spain	
	MRG	MANAG'AIR	MANAG'AIR	France	
AQ	MPJ	MAP-Management and Planung	MAPJET	Austria	
	TFG	MAS Airways	TRAFALGAR	United Kingdom	
M7	MAA	MasAir	MAS CARGA	Mexico	
MH	MWG	MASwings	MASWINGS	Malaysia	transitioned to AirBorneo on 1 January 2026
IN	MAK	MAT Macedonian Airlines	MAKAVIO	Macedonia	Defunct
	MCC	MCC Aviation	DISCOVERY	South Africa	
	MGA	MG Aviación	MAG AVACION	Spain	
	JLA	MIA Airlines	SALLINE	Romania	
OM	MGL	MIAT Mongolian Airlines	MONGOL AIR	Mongolia	
	MNC	MIT Airlines	MUNCIE	Canada	
	MKA	MK Airline	KRUGER-AIR	Ghana	
MB	MNB	MNG Airlines	BLACK SEA	Turkey	
	EBF	MSR Flug-Charter	SKYRUNNER	Germany	
	MCV	MTC Aviación	MTC AVIACION	Mexico	
	MAQ	Mac Aviation	MAC AVIATION	Spain	
	MCN	Mac Dan Aviation Corporation	MAC DAN	United States	
	MTD	MacKnight Airlines		Australia	
CC	MCK	Macair Airlines		Australia	
	MCS	Macedonian Airlines	MACAIR	Greece	
	MDH	Madina Air	MADINA AIR	Libya	
DM	DAN	Maersk Air	MAERSKAIR	Denmark	Defunct
VB	MSK	Maersk Air UK	BLUESTAR	United Kingdom	Defunct, later became Duo Airways
	MJB	Magic Blue Airlines	MAGIC BLUE	Netherlands	
	MGR	Magna Air	MAGNA AIR	Austria	
	MLH	Mahalo Air	MAHALO	United States	
W5	IRM	Mahan Air	MAHAN AIR	Iran	
M2	MZS	Mahfooz Aviation	MAHFOOZ	Gambia	
	MAT	Maine Aviation	MAINE-AV	United States	
	MAJ	Majestic Airlines	MAGIC AIR	United States	
	AKM	Mak Air	MAKAIR	Kazakhstan	
	MLG	Malagasy Airlines		Madagascar	
	MLX	Malawi Express	MALAWI EXPRESS	Malawi	
	MKK	Malaya Aviatsia Dona	AEROKEY	Russia	
MH	MAS	Malaysia Airlines	MALAYSIAN	Malaysia	
DB	MLT	Maleth-Aero		Malta	
	MAE	Mali Air	MALI AIREXPRESS	Austria	
	VXP	Mali Air Express	AVION EXPRESS	Mali	
	MTZ	Mali Airways	MALI AIRWAYS	Mali	
	MLC	Malila Airlift	MALILA	Democratic Republic of the Congo	
	MLS	Mall Airways	MALL-AIRWAYS	United States	
	LOD	Malmoe Air Taxi	LOGIC	Sweden	
TF	SCW	Malmö Aviation	SCANWING	Sweden	
	MAY	Malta Air		Malta	2019
R5	MAC	Malta Air Charter	MALTA CHARTER	Malta	Defunct?
	MWS	Malta Wings	MALTA WINGS	Malta	
MA	MAH	Malév Hungarian Airlines	MALEV	Hungary	defunct
	MLB	Manaf International Airways	MANAF	Burundi	
RI	MDL	Mandala Airlines	MANDALA	Indonesia	
AE	MDA	Mandarin Airlines	MANDARIN	Taiwan	
JE	MNO	Mango	TULCA	South Africa	
	MHN	Manhattan Air	MANHATTAN	United Kingdom	
	MTO	Marathon Airlines	MARATHON	Greece	
	MNR	Mann Air	TEEMOL	United Kingdom	
	MAN	Mannion Air Charter	MANNION	United States	
	MTS	Mantrust Asahi Airways	MANTRUST	Indonesia	
	MNX	Manx Airlines	MANX	United Kingdom	
	MAD	Maple Air Services	MAPLE AIR	Canada	
	MAR	March Helicopters	MARCH	United Kingdom	
	MCP	Marcopolo Airways	MARCOPOLO	Afghanistan	
	MGI	Marghi Air	MARGHI	Nigeria	
	MRK	Markair	MARKAIR	United States	
	MKO	Markoss Aviation	GOSHAWK	United Kingdom	
6V	MRW	Mars RK	AVIAMARS	Ukraine	
	MCE	Marshall Aerospace	MARSHALL	United Kingdom	
M7	MSL	Marsland Aviation	MARSLANDAIR	Sudan	
	XMA	Martin Aviation Services		United States	
	MBE	Martin-Baker	MARTIN	United Kingdom	
MP	MPH	Martinair	MARTINAIR	Netherlands	
	MRA	Martinaire	MARTEX	United States	
	MFA	Martyn Fiddler Associates	SEAHORSE	United Kingdom	
	MVN	Marvin Limited	MARVIN	United Kingdom	
	TRP	Maryland State Police	TROOPER	United States	
	MTH	Massachusetts Institute of Technology	RESEARCH	United States	
	MSY	Massey University School of Aviation	MASSEY	New Zealand	
	MSW	Master Airways	MASTER AIRWAYS	Serbia	
	MPL	Master Planner		United States	
	LMJ	Masterjet	MASTERJET	Portugal	
Q4		Mastertop Linhas Aéreas		Brazil	
	MIA	Mauria	MAURIA	Mauritania	
	MNV	Mauritanienne Aerienne Et Navale	NAVALE	Mauritania	
	MRF	Mauritanienne Air Fret	MAUR-FRET	Mauritania	
	MWY	Mauritanienne Airways	MAURITANIENNE	Mauritania	
	MDE	Mauritanienne De Transport Aerien	MAURI-TRANS	Mauritania	
	MVR	Maverick Airways	MAV-AIR	United States	
H5	MVL	Mavial Magadan Airlines	Mavial	Russia	
	MAI	Max Avia	MAX AVIA	Kyrgyzstan	
	MSF	Max Sea Food	MAXESA	El Salvador	
	MAX	Max-Aviation	MAX AVIATION	Canada	
8M	MXL	Maxair	MAXAIR	Sweden	
	MXU	Maximus Air Cargo	CARGO MAX	United Arab Emirates	
MY	MXJ	Maxjet Airways	MAX-JET	United States	Defunct
	MXS	Maxsus-Avia	MAXSUS-AVIA	Uzbekistan	
	MXP	May Air Xpress	BEECHNUT	United States	
MW	MYD	Maya Island Air	MYLAND	Belize	
7M	MYI	Mayair	MAYAIR	Mexico	
	MBS	Mbach Air	MBACHI AIR	Malawi	Ground Services
	MCH	McAlpine Helicopters	MACLINE	United Kingdom	
	MKL	McCall Aviation	MCCALL	United States	
	DAC	McDonnell Douglas	DACO	United States	
	MDS	McNeely Charter Services	MID-SOUTH	United States	
	MEK	Med-Trans of Florida	MED-TRANS	United States	
	MDM	Medavia	MEDAVIA	Malta	
	MRZ	Medical Air Rescue Services	MARS	Zimbabwe	
	MCL	Medical Aviation Services	MEDIC	United Kingdom	
	MDF	Mediterranean Air Freight	MED-FREIGHT	Greece	
	MDY	Mediterranean Airways		Egypt	
	MEJ	Medjet International	MEDJET	United States	
	MGK	Mega	MEGLA	Kazakhstan	
	MEL	Mega Linhas Aéreas	MEGA AIR	Brazil	
M8	MKN	Mekong Airlines	MEKONG AIRLINES	Cambodia	Defunct
IM	MNJ	Menajet	MENAJET	Lebanon	
		Mercer Airlines		United States	Defunct
	MXX	Merchant Express Aviation	MERCHANT	Nigeria	
	MEC	Mercury Aircourier Service	MERCAIR	United States	
	POV	Meridian	AIR POLTAVA	Ukraine	
	MRD	Meridian Air Cargo	MERIDIAN	United States	
	MHL	Meridian Airlines	HASSIMAIR	Nigeria	
	DSL	Meridian Aviation	DIESEL	United Kingdom	
	MEM	Meridian Limited	MERIDIAN CHERRY	Ukraine	
IG	ISS	Meridiana	MERIDIANA	Italy	Callsign was MERAIR
	MEI	Merlin Airways	AVALON	United States	
MZ	MNA	Merpati Nusantara Airlines	MERPATI	Indonesia	
YV	ASH	Mesa Airlines	AIR SHUTTLE	United States	
XJ	MES	Mesaba Airlines	MESABA	United States	
	MSQ	Meta Linhas Aéreas	META	Brazil	
	MET	Meteorological Research Flight	METMAN	United Kingdom	METMAN1 callsign formerly used by FAAM Airborne Laboratory to 2025, operated by Airtask Group. Owned by the Met Office and currently not in use.
	MER	Methow Aviation	METHOW	United States	
	MVI	Metro Business Aviation		United Kingdom	
	MEX	Metro Express	EAGLE EXPRESS	United States	
	MTR	Metroflight	METRO	United States	
	MTJ	Metrojet	METROJET	Hong Kong	
	PIX	Metropix UK	METROPIX	United Kingdom	
	MPS	Metropolis	METRO REGIONAL	Netherlands	Metropolis Noord 1
	MXB	Mex Blue	MEX BLUE	Mexico	
	MJT	Mex-Jet	MEJETS	Mexico	
GJ	MXC	Mexicargo	MEXICARGO	Mexico	defunct
	MXA	Mexicana de Aviación	MEXICANA	Mexico	
	MXT	México Transportes Aéreos	TRANSMEX	Mexico	
	HUR	Miami Air Charter	HURRICANE CHARTER	United States	
LL	BSK	Miami Air International	BISCAYNE	United States	Previous IATA Code "GL"
	OWL	Miami Valley Aviation	NIGHT OWL	United States	
	MPT	Miapet-Avia	MIAPET	Armenia	
	BIB	Michelin Air Services		France	
	WIZ	Micromatter Technology Solutions	WIZARD	United Kingdom	
	NYL	Mid Airlines	NILE	Sudan	
	MPA	Mid-Pacific Airlines	MID PAC	United States	
	MJR	Midamerica Jet	MAJOR	United States	
ME	MEA	Middle East Airlines	CEDAR JET	Lebanon	
	MID	Midland Airport Services		United Kingdom	
	MFR	Midline Air Freight	MIDLINE FREIGHT	United States	
	MIS	Midstate Airlines	MIDSTATE	United States	
JI	MDW	Midway Airlines (1993–2003)	MIDWAY	United States	defunct
ML	MDW	Midway Airlines (1976–1991)	MIDWAY	United States	defunct
	FLA	Midway Express	PALM	United States	
	FAX	Midwest Air Freighters	FAIRFAX	United States	
YX	MEP	Midwest Airlines	MIDEX	United States	
MY	MWA	Midwest Airlines (Egypt)		Egypt	
	NIT	Midwest Aviation	NIGHTTRAIN	United States	
	MWT	Midwest Aviation Division	MIDWEST	United States	
	HTE	Midwest Helicopters De Mexico	HELICOPTERSMEXICO	Mexico	
MJ	MLR	Mihin Lanka	MIHIN LANKA	Sri Lanka	
	MAB	Millardair	MILLARDAIR	Canada	
	RJM	Millen Corporation	MILLEN	United Kingdom	
	MLK	Millennium Air	NIGERJET	Nigeria	
	DLK	Millennium Airlines	DEKKANLANKA	Sri Lanka	
	MFS	Miller Flying Services	MILLER TIME	United States	
	OXO	Million Air	MILL AIR	United States	
	MIM	Mimino	MIMINO	Russia	
	NAB	Mina Airline Company		Egypt	
	OMR	Minair	ORMINE	Central African Republic	
	EBE	Minebea Technologies	MINEBEA	United States	
	MAZ	Mines Air Services Zambia	MINES	Zambia	
	MNL	Miniliner	MINILINER	Italy	
	MNS	Ministic Air	MINISTIC	Canada	
	WDG	Ministry of Agriculture, Fisheries and Food	WATCHDOG	United Kingdom	
	LIR	Minsk Aircraft Overhaul Plant	LISLINE	Belarus	
	MIC	Mint Airways	MINT AIRWAYS	Spain	
	MIR	Miramichi Air Service	MIRAMICHI	Canada	
	MIF	Miras	MIRAS	Kazakhstan	
	MOS	Misr Overseas Airways		Egypt	
	MAF	Mission Aviation Fellowship	MISSI	Indonesia	
	MSN	Missionair	MISIONAIR	Spain	
	MRN	Missions Gouvernemtales Francaises	MARIANNE	France	
	BDG	Mississippi State University	BULLDOG	United States	
XV	MVA	Mississippi Valley Airlines	VALAIR	United States	
M4	MSA	Mistral Air	AIRMERCI	Italy	renamed Poste Air Cargo
	MJF	MJET	EM-EXPRESS	Austria	
	MBO	Mobil Oil	MOBIL	Canada	
	MXE	Mocambique Expresso	MOZAMBIQUE EXPRESS	Mozambique	
	MFZ	Mofaz Air	MOFAZ AIR	Malaysia	
	MOW	Mohawk Airlines	MOHAWK AIR	United States	
MW	MUL	Mokulele Airlines	MUKULELE	United States	Callsign and code changed from BUG/SPEEDBUGGY in 2013
	MLE	Moldaeroservice	MOLDAERO	Moldova	
2M	MDV	Moldavian Airlines	MOLDAVIAN	Moldova	
	MVG	Moldova	MOLDOVA-STATE	Moldova	
	RRV	Mombasa Air Safari	SKYROVER	Kenya	
ZB	MON	Monarch Airlines	MONARCH	United Kingdom	defunct October 2017
	MNH	Monarch Airlines	MONARCH AIR	United States	
8I		Myway Airlines		Italy	
	MFC	Moncton Flying Club	EAST WIND	Canada	
	MDB	Monde Air Charters	MONDEAIR CARGO	United Kingdom	
	MTI	Monerrey Air Taxi	MONTERREY AIR	Mexico	
	MKY	Monky Aerotaxis	MONKY	Mexico	
YM	MGX	Montenegro Airlines	MONTENEGRO	Montenegro	former callsign was "MONTAIR"
5M	MNT	Montserrat Airways	MONTSERRAT	Montserrat	
	MNY	Mooney Aircraft Corporation	MOONEY FLIGHT	United States	
	MAL	Morningstar Air Express	MORNINGSTAR	Canada	
	MSS	Morris Air Service	WASATCH	United States	
	MRO	Morrison Flying Service	MORRISON	United States	
3R	GAI	Moskovia Airlines	GROMOV AIRLINE	Russia	JSC
	MPI	Mosphil Aero	MOSPHIL	Philippines	
M9	MSI	Motor Sich Airlines	MOTOR SICH	Ukraine	
NM	NZM	Mount Cook Airline	MOUNTCOOK	New Zealand	
	MTN	Mountain Air Cargo	MOUNTAIN	United States	
N4	MTC	Mountain Air Company	MOUNTAIN LEONE	Sierra Leone	
	PKP	Mountain Air Express	PIKES PEAK	United States	
	BRR	Mountain Air Service	MOUNTAIN AIR	United States	
	MBI	Mountain Bird	MOUNTAIN BIRD	United States	
	MHA	Mountain High Aviation	MOUNTAIN HIGH	United States	
	MPC	Mountain Pacific Air	MOUNTAIN PACIFIC	Canada	
	MTV	Mountain Valley Air Service	MOUNTAIN VALLEY	United States	
	MDN	Mudan Airlines		Somali Republic	
	CMJ	Mudanjiang General Aviation	MUDANJIANG	China	
	MTX	Multi Taxi	MULTITAXI	Mexico	
	WBR	Multi-Aero	WEBER	United States	
	MFT	Multiflight	YORKAIR		
	MNZ	Murmansk Aircompany	MURMAN AIR	Russia	
	MUA	Murray Air	MURRAY AIR	United States	
	MMR	Musrata Air Transport	MUSRATA AIR	Libya	
	MAW	Mustique Airways	MUSTIQUE	Barbados	
Z9	MYM	MYAirline	MYAIR	Malaysia	defunct
	MYW	MyWay Airlines	MYSKY	Georgia	
VZ	MYT	MyTravel Airways	KESTREL	United Kingdom	Defunct, callsign now used by Thomas Cook Airlines
UB	UBA	Myanma Airways	UNIONAIR	Myanmar	
8M	MMA	Myanmar Airways International	MYANMAR	Myanmar	
	MAV	Minoan Air	MINOAN	Greece	Now were days ICAO was used by Manta Air
	MYA	Myflug	MYFLUG	Iceland	
	VKG	MyTravel Airways	VIKING	Denmark	defunct; callsign now used by Thomas Cook Airlines Scandinavia
	AAD	Mann Air Ltd	Ambassador	United Kingdom	t/a Ambassador
M2	MHV	MHS Aviation GmbH	SNOWCAP	Germany	
	MTU	Middle Tennessee State University	BLUE RAIDER	United States	2019
NP	NIA	Nile Air	NILE BIRD	Egypt	
	SIQ	National Center for Atmospheric Research	SCIENCE QUEST	United States	
	NEJ	Netjets Business Aviation	NET BUSINESS	China	
	NHV	NHV Aviation		Ghana	
	NHC	Northern Helicopter	NORTHERN	Germany	
	DMD	Namdeb Diamond Corporation	DIAMONDJET	Namibia	
6N	NIN	Niger Airlines	NIGER AIRLINES	Niger	
N5	FEY	Fly Easy	FLYEASY	India	
	NUB	Nomad Aviation	VALLETTA	Malta	
	NJA	New Japan Aviation	SHIN NIHON	Japan	
	ROW	Nor Aviation	ROTORWING	Norway	
	NLG	NEL Cargo	NELCARGO	Ivory Coast	
	NHG	NHT Linhas Aéreas	HELGA	Brazil	
	WAR	NZ Warbirds Association	WARBIRDS	New Zealand	
	ANL	Nacoia Lda	AIR NACOIA	Angola	
	NHZ	Nada Air Service	NADA AIR	Chad	
	BFN	Compangnie Nationale Naganagani		Burkina Faso	
	NAH	Nahanni Air Services Ltd	NAHANNI	Canada	
	NKL	Nakheel Aviation	NAKHEEL	United Arab Emirates	
	MRE	Namibia Commercial Aviation	MED RESCUE	Namibia	
	NDF	Namibian Defence Force	NAMIBIAN AIR FORCE	Namibia	
	CNJ	Nanjing Airlines	NINGHANG	China	
DV	ACK	Nantucket Airlines	ACK AIR	United States	WAS 9k
	NYA	Nanyah Aviation	NANYAH	Israel	
	NAP	Napier Air Service Inc	NAPIER	United States	
	NCM	Nas Air	AIR BANE	Angola	
P9		Nas Air		Mali	
UE	NAS	Nasair	NASAIRWAYS	Eritrea	
	NJC	Nashville Jet Charters	NASHVILLE JET	United States	
	NCO	Natalco Air Lines	NATALCO	São Tomé and Príncipe	
	NTK	National Air Traffic Controllers Association	NATCA	United States	
	NSR	National Air Charter	NASAIR	Indonesia	
	RFI	National Air Traffic Services	SHERLOCK	United Kingdom	
	NAN	National Airlines	NATION AIR	United States	defunct
N4	NCN	National Airlines		Chile	
N7	ROK	National Airlines	RED ROCK	United States	defunct
NA	NAL	National Airlines	NATIONAL	United States	defunct
N8	NCR	National Air Cargo dba National Airlines	NATIONAL CARGO	United States	
9Y	NAE	National Airways Ethiopia	NATIONAL	Ethiopia	
IN	NIH	NAM Air	NAM	Indonesia	
	KUS	National Airlines	KUSWAG	South Africa	
9O		National Airways Cameroon		Cameroon	
	LFI	National Airways Corporation	AEROMED	South Africa	
	GTY	National Aviation Company		Egypt	
	TNC	National Aviation Consultants	NATCOM	Canada	
	NXT	National Express	NATIONAL FREIGHT	United States	Texas Air Charters
	GRD	National Grid plc	GRID	United Kingdom	
NC*	JTE	National Jet Express	JETEX	Australia	
	AND	National Jet Service	AIR INDIANA	United States	
NC*	NJS	National Jet Systems	NATIONAL JET	Australia	defunct acquired by Qantas
	NOL	National Overseas Airlines Company	NAT AIRLINE	Egypt	
	NLS	Nationale Luchtvaartschool	PANDER	Netherlands	
	NAE	Nations Air Express Inc	NATIONS EXPRESS	United States	
CE	NTW	Nationwide Airlines	NATIONWIDE	South Africa	
	NWZ	Nationwide Airlines (Zambia)	ZAMNAT	Zambia	
	EVM	Natural Environment Research Council	SCIENCE	United Kingdom	
	NRR	Natureair	NATUREAIR	Costa Rica	
	NRK	Naturelink Charter	NATURELINK	South Africa	
	NVC	Nav Canada	NAV CAN	Canada	
	NAV	Nav Flight Planning	NAV DISPATCH	Czech Republic	
	NVP	Navegacao Aérea De Portugal		Portugal	
	NAY	Navegación Servicios Aéreos Canarios S.A.	NAYSA	Spain	
	IRI	Navid	NAVID	Iran	
	NVM	Naviera Mexicana	NAVIERA	Mexico	
	NVL	Navigator Airlines	NAVLINES	Armenia	
	XNV	Navinc Airlines Services		United States	Tigin Limited
1N		Navitaire		United States	
	XNS	Navtech System Support		Canada	
	NZA	Nayzak Air Transport		Libya	
	NEB	State of Nebraska	NEBRASKA	United States	
	NEC	Necon Air	NECON AIR	Nepal	
	NCG	Nederlandse Kustwacht	NETHERLANDS COASTGUARD	Netherlands	
	NFT	Nefteyugansk Aviation Division	NEFTEAVIA	Russia	
	NLA	Neiltown Air	NEILTOWN AIR	Canada	
	NLC	Nelair Charters	NELAIR	South Africa	
	CGE	Nelson Aviation College	COLLEGE	New Zealand	
RA	RNA	Nepal Airlines	ROYAL NEPAL	Nepal	was Royal Nepal Airlines
NO	NOS	Neos	MOONFLOWER	Italy	
	TOX	Neosiam Airways	SKY KINGDOM	Thailand	
	NSL	Neric	NERICAIR	United Kingdom	
NE	NMA	Nesma Airlines	NESMA	Egypt	
1I	EJA	NetJets	EXECJET	United States	
	NET	Network Aviation Services	NETWORK	Nigeria	
	NEZ	New England Air Express	ENGAIR	United States	
EJ	NEA	New England Airlines	NEW ENGLAND	United States	
	NHT	New Heights 291	NEWHEIGHTS	South Africa	
	NWD	New World Jet Corporation	NEW WORLD	United States	
	NYH	New York Helicopter	NEW YORK	United States	
	GRY	New York State Police	GRAY RIDER	United States	
	KRC	Royal New Zealand Air Force	KIWI RESCUE	New Zealand	
	HVA	Newair	HAVEN-AIR	United States	
	NLT	Newfoundland Labrador Air Transport	NALAIR	Canada	
2N	NTJ	NextJet	NEXTJET	Sweden	
	NXF	Nextflight Aviation	NEXTFLIGHT	United States	
	NXS	Nexus Aviation	NEXUS AVIATION	Nigeria	
	NIS	Nicaragüense de Aviación	NICA	Nicaragua	
	NCN	Nicon Airways	NICON AIRWAYS	Nigeria	Ceased operations 2007
	NGA	Nigeria Airways	NIGERIA	Nigeria	
	NGR	Nigerian Air Force	NIGERIAN AIRFORCE	Nigeria	
	NGX	Nigerian Global	AIR GLOBAL	Nigeria	
	EXT	Nightexpress	EXECUTIVE	Germany	
HG	NLY	Niki	FLYNIKI	Austria	
	NKV	Nikolaev-Air	AIR NIKOLAEV	Ukraine	Airline of Special Purpose
	NSA	Nile Safaris Aviation	NILE SAFARIS	Sudan	
	NVA	Nile Valley Aviation Company		Egypt	defunct
	NLW	Nile Wings Aviation Services	NILE WINGS	Sudan	
	NBS	Nimbus Aviation	NIMBUS	United Kingdom	
	NSR	Nine Star Airways	AIR STAR	Thailand	2014
KZ	NCA	Nippon Cargo Airlines	NIPPON CARGO	Japan	
	NVK	Nizhnevartovskavia	VARTOSKAVIA	Russia	
	NOH	No. 32 (The Royal) Squadron	NORTHOLT	United Kingdom	
	AKG	No. 84 Squadron RAF	GRIFTER	United Kingdom	
	NBL	Nobil Air	NOBIL AIR	Moldova	
DD	NOK	Nok Air	NOK AIR	Thailand	
XW	NCT	NokScoot	BIG BIRD	Thailand	
N5	NRL	Nolinor Aviation	NOLINOR	Canada	
	NMD	Nomad Aviation	NOMAD AIR	Namibia	
	OMD	Nomadic Aviation Group LLC	NOMADIC	United States	
	NOC	Norcopter	NORCOPTER	Norway	
	NEF	Nord-Flyg	NORDEX	Sweden	
5N	AUL	Nordavia	ARCHANGELSK AIR	Russia	
JH	NES	Nordeste Linhas Aéreas Regionais	NORDESTE	Brazil	
6N	NRD	Nordic Regional	NORTH RIDER	Sweden	
Y7	TYA	NordStar	TAIMYR	Russia	
	NDS	Nordstree (Australia)		Australia	
N4	NWS	Nordwind Airlines	NORDLAND	Russia	
	NRT	Norestair	NORESTAIR	Spain	
N5		Norfolk Air		Norfolk Island	Defunct
	NCF	Norfolk County Flight College	COUNTY	United Kingdom	
	FNA	Norlandair	NORLAND	Iceland	
	NOA	Norontair	NORONTAIR	Canada	
	HMF	Norrlandsflyg	LIFEGUARD SWEDEN	Sweden	
	NRX	Norse Air Charter	NORSE AIR	South Africa	
N0	NBT	Norse Atlantic Airways	LONGSHIP	Norway	
Z0	UBT	Norse Atlantic UK	LONGBOAT	United Kingdom	
	NIR	Norsk Flytjeneste	NORSEMAN	Norway	
	NOR	Norsk Helikopter	NORSKE	Norway	
	DOC	Norsk Luftambulanse	HELIDOC	Norway	
	RTV	Nortavia	TIC-TAC	Portugal	
	NAI	North Adria Aviation	NORTH-ADRIA	Croatia	
NA	NAO	North American Airlines	NORTH AMERICAN	United States	
	HMR	North American Charters	HAMMER	Canada	
	NAJ	North American Jet Charter Group	JET GROUP	United States	
	NAT	North Atlantic Air Inc	MASS AIR	United States	
	NFC	North Atlantic Cargo	NORTH ATLANTIC	Norway	
	NBN	North British Airlines	TEESAIR	United Kingdom	
	NCB	North Caribou Flying Service Ltd	NORTH CARIBOU	Canada	
N/A	N/A	North Coast Air Services Ltd	NORTH COAST	Canada	
N9		North Coast Aviation		Papua New Guinea	
M3	NFA	North Flying	NORTH FLYING	Denmark	
	NRC	North Sea Airways	NORTH SEA	Netherlands	
	SBX	North Star Air Cargo	SKY BOX	United States	
	NRV	North Vancouver Airlines	NORVAN	Canada	
	NWW	North West Airlines	HALANT	Australia	
	PTO	North West Geomatics	PHOTO	Canada	
	NEN	North-East Airlines	NORTHEAST SWAN	Nigeria	
	VBG	North-West Air Transport Company - Vyborg	VYBORG AIR	Russia	
HW	NWL	North-Wright Airways	NORTHWRIGHT	Canada	
	NLL	Northafrican Air Transport	NORTHAFRICAN AIR	Libya	
	NFL	Northaire Freight Lines	GREAT LAKES	United States	
	NSF	Northamptonshire School of Flying	NORTON	United Kingdom	
	NCE	Northcoast Executive Airlines	TOP HAT	United States	
NE	NEE	Northeast Airlines	NORTHEAST	United States	
	NPX	Northeast Aviation	NORTHEAST EXPRESS	United States	
	NEW	Northeastern Aviation	MEADOW FLIGHT	United States	2014
NC*	NAC	Northern Air Cargo	YUKON	United States	
	BYC	Northern Airlines Sanya	BEIYA	China	
	NDA	Northern Airways	NORTHERN DAKOTA	United States	
	CMU	Northern Aviation Service	LANNA AIR	Thailand	
U7		Northern Dene Airways		Canada	
	NEX	Northern Executive Aviation	NEATAX	United Kingdom	
	NIC	Northern Illinois Commuter	ILLINOIS COMMUTER	United States	
	NTX	Northern Jet Management	NORTAX	United States	
7H	RVF	Northern Pacific Airways	—Raven Flight	United States	
	NTA	Northern Thunderbird Air	THUNDERBIRD	Canada	
	KOE	Northland Aviation	KOKEE	United States	
	NSS	Northstar Aviation	NORTHSTAR	United States	
	NHL	Northumbria Helicopters	NORTHUMBRIA	United Kingdom	
	NAL	Northway Aviation Ltd	NORTHWAY	Canada	
	NWE	Northwest Aero Associates		United States	
NW	NWA	Northwest Airlines	NORTHWEST	United States	defunct merged with Delta Air Lines
FY	NWR	Northwest Regional Airlines		Australia	
	NWT	Northwest Territorial Airways	TERRITORIAL	Canada	
J3	PLR	Northwestern Air	POLARIS	Canada	
	NWN	Northwinds Northern	NORTHWINDS	Canada	
	NAM	Nortland Air Manitoba	MANITOBA	Canada	
D8*	IBK	Norwegian Air International	NORTRANS	Ireland	subsidiary of Norwegian Air Shuttle (Ceased operations 2021)
DY	NOZ	Norwegian Air Shuttle	NORDIC	Norway	
DI	NRS	Norwegian Air UK	REDNOSE*	United Kingdom	subsidiary of Norwegian Air Shuttle (Ceased operations 2021)
DN	NAA	Norwegian Air Argentina	NORUEGA	Argentina	subsidiary of Norwegian Air Shuttle (Ceased operations 2019)
DU	NLH	Norwegian Long Haul	NORSTAR	Norway	subsidiary of Norwegian Air Shuttle (Ceased operations 2021)
DH	NAN	Norwegian Air Norway	NORSHIP	Norway	subsidiary of Norwegian Air Shuttle (transferred sole aircraft back to Norwegian Air Shuttle AOC in 2023)
D8	NSZ	Norwegian Air Sweden	REDNOSE	Sweden	subsidiary of Norwegian Air Shuttle
	TFN	Norwegian Aviation College	SPIRIT	Norway	
	XNT	Notams International		United States	
BJ	LBT	Nouvel Air Tunisie	NOUVELAIR	Tunisia	
O9	NOV	Nova Airways	NOVANILE	Sudan	
	PTR	Nova Scotia Department of Lands and Forests	PATROL	Canada	
1I	NVR	Novair	NAVIGATOR	Sweden	
VQ	NVQ	Novo Air	NOVO AIR	Bangladesh	
	NVG	Novgorod Air Enterprise	SADKO AVIA	Russia	
	NSP	Novosibirsk Aircraft Repairing Plant	NARPAIR	Russia	
	NBE	Novosibirsk Aviaenterprise	NAKAIR	Russia	
	NPO	Novosibirsk Aviation Production Association	NOVSIB	Russia	
	NOY	Noy Aviation	NOY AVIATION	Israel	
N6	ACQ	Nuevo Continente	AERO CONTINENTE	Peru	Operating license revoked by Chile 10/06/2002; Ceased operations 2005; Former name: Aero Continente
	NHR	Nuevo Horizonte Internacional	NUEVO HORIZONTE	Mexico	
	NUN	Nunasi-Central Airlines	NUNASI	Canada	
	NIN	Nurman Avia Indopura	NURVINDO	Indonesia	
	NYS	Nyasa Express	NYASA	Malawi	
1I	NJE	NetJets Europe	FRACTION	Portugal	
	ORN	Orange Air	ORANGE JET	United States	Allocated in 2014
IP	ONS	One Airlines	AIR DREAMS	Chile	
	FET	Old Dominion Freight Lines	FREIGHT LINE	United States	
	OCN	O Air	O-BIRD	France	defunct
UQ	OCM	O'Connor Airlines	OCONNOR	Australia	Defunct - Bankrupt
	DRL	Omni Air Transport	DRILLER	United States	
	OWE	Owenair	OWENAIR	South Africa	
OB	AAN	Oasis Airlines	Oasis	Spain	defunct
O8	OHK	Oasis Hong Kong Airlines	OASIS	Hong Kong	Defunct
	BCN	Ocean Air	BLUE OCEAN	Mauritania	
VC	VCX	Ocean Airlines	OCEANCARGO	Italy	
	OCS	Ocean Sky UK	OCEANSKY	United Kingdom	
	TUK	Ocean Wings Commuter Service	TUCKERNUCK	United States	New Island Connections
O2		Linear Air	HARPOON	United States	Allocated in 2017
	ODS	Odessa Airlines	ODESSA AIR	Ukraine	
	FOC	Office Federal De'Aviation Civile	FOCA	Switzerland	
	GBO	Ogooue Air Cargo		Gabon	
	OKJ	Okada Airlines	OKADA AIR	Nigeria	
	OKP	Okapi Airways	OKAPI	Democratic Republic of Congo	
	OKA	Okay Airways	OKAYJET	China	
	OKL	Oklahoma Department of Public Safety	OKLAHOMA	United States	Troop O
	OLX	Olimex Aerotaxi	OLIMEX	Czech Republic	
	KVK	Olimp Air	PONTA	Kazakhstan	
OL	OLT	OLT Express Germany	OLTRA	Germany	
OA	OAL	Olympic Air	OLYMPIC	Greece	
	OLY	Olympic Aviation	OLAVIA	Greece	
WY	OMA	Oman Air	OMAN AIR	Oman	
	ORF	Oman Royal Flight	OMAN	Oman	
OV	OMS	SalamAir	MAZOON	Oman	Oman’s first Low Cost Carrier
	OAV	Omni - Aviacao e Tecnologia	OMNI	Portugal	
OY	OAE	Omni Air International	OMNI-EXPRESS	United States	
	ONI	OMNI AVIATION TRAINING CENTER	OMNI TRAINING	Portugal	Part of the same group as Omni - Aviacao e Tecnologia
	OMF	Omniflys	OMNIFLYS	Mexico	
	ORL	On Air Limited	ON AIR	Canada	
	OST	Oklahoma State University	OSTATE	United States	
	OTG	One Two Go Airlines	THAI EXPRESS	Thailand	
	OTM	Onetime Airlines Zambia	ZEDTIME	Zambia	
	MED	Ontario Ministry of Health	MEDICAL	Canada	
8Q	OHY	Onur Air	ONUR AIR	Turkey	
	OPA	Opal Air		Australia	
	OSA	Open Sky Aviation		Lebanon	
	BOS	OpenSkies	MISTRAL	United Kingdom	
	ORR	Operadora Turistica Aurora	TURISTICA AURORA	Mexico	
	OLE	Operadora de Lineas Ejecutivas	OPERADORA	Mexico	
	OTP	Operadora de Transportes Aéreos	OPERADORA AEREO	Mexico	
	OPV	Operadora de Veulos Ejectutivos	OPERADORA DE VUELOS	Mexico	
	LLO	Operation Enduring Freedom	APOLLO	Canada	
	OAX	Operational Aviation Services		Australia	
	ORD	Orange Air Services	ORANGE SERVICES	Sierra Leone	
	ORJ	Orange Air Sierra Leone	ORANGE SIERRA	Sierra Leone	
	ORE	Orange Aviation	ORANGE AVIATION	Israel	
	ORX	Orbit Express Airlines	OREX	Turkey	
	ORK	Orca Air	ORCA TAXI	Egypt	
	BUE	Orebro Aviation	BLUELIGHT	Sweden	
	ORM	Orel State Air Enterprise	ORPRISE	Russia	
R2	ORB	Orenburg Airlines	ORENBURG	Russia	
	OTA	Organizacion De Transportes Aéreos	ORGANIZACION	Mexico	
	OML	Organizacoes Mambra	MAMBRA	Angola	
	OVV	Orient Air	ORIENTSYR	Syrian Arab Republic	
	OTR	Orient Airlines	ORIENTROC	Sudan	
	ORN	Orient Airways	ORIENT LINER	Pakistan	
OX	OEA	Orient Thai Airlines	ORIENT THAI	Thailand	
	NGK	Oriental Air Bridge	ORIENTAL BRIDGE	Japan	
	OAC	Oriental Airlines	ORIENTAL AIR	Nigeria	
QO	OGN	Origin Pacific Airways	ORIGIN	New Zealand	
	OED	Orion Air Charter	ORION CHARTER	South Africa	
	OIX	Orion-x	ORIONIX	Russia	
	KOV	Orlan-2000	ORLAN	Kazakhstan	
	RNG	Orange Aircraft Leasing	ORANGE	Netherlands	
	OAD	Orscom Tourist Installations Company	ORSCOM	Egypt	
	JPA	OSACOM	J-PAT	United States	United States Army
	OSH	Osh Avia	OSH AVIA	Kyrgyzstan	
	OCO	Ostend Air College	AIR COLLEGE	Belgium	
	ODY	Odyssey International	ODYSSEY	Canada	
	FNL	Oulun Tilauslento	FINN FLIGHT	Finland	
ON	RON	Our Airline	OUR AIRLINE	Nauru	formerly Air Nauru
	OOT	Out Of The Blue Air Safaris	OOTBAS	South Africa	
OJ	OLA	Overland Airways	OVERLAND	Nigeria	
	OAR	ONE AIR	BOSS AIR	Spain	
	OXE	Oxaero	OXOE	United Kingdom	
	WDK	Oxford Air Services	WOODSTOCK	United Kingdom	
	OAA	Oxley Aviation		Australia	
OZ	OZR	Ozark Air Lines	OZARK	United States	Defunct
O7	OZJ	OzJet	AUSJET	Australia	
	OSU	Ohio State University	SCARLET	United States	
OA	OAL	Olympic Airlines	OLYMPIC	Greece	Defunct
OB	AAN	Oasis International Airlines Now assigned to Boliviana de Aviacion (BoA)	OASIS	Spain	Ceased operations
	ORT	Ortac	SKYWALKER	Jersey	
PB	PVL	PAL Airlines	PAL Airlines	Canada	
2P	GAP	PAL Express	AIRPHIL	Philippines	Regional subsidiary of Philippine Airlines
	PIP	Pilot Flight Academy	PILOT	Norway	
	HRS	Pursuit Aviation	HORSEMAN	United States	2016
	NCT	Pete Air	PETE AIR	Thailand	2014
	PRT	Prime Service Italia	PRIME ITALIA	Italy	2014
	PXT	Pacific Coast Jet	PACK COAST	United States	Allocated in 2014
	BPH	Phoenix Helicopter Academy	BLACK PHOENIX	United Kingdom	
	PFY	Pel-Air Aviation	PELFLIGHT	Australia	
	PXR	Pixair Survey	PIXAIR	France	
	PNC	Prince Aviation	PRINCE	Serbia	
	PMI	Primero Transportes Aereos	AEROEPRIM	Mexico	
	KTL	P & P Floss Pick Manufacturers	KNOTTSBERRY	South Africa	
	PCR	PAC Air	PACAIR	United States	Pearson Aviation Corporation
PV	PNR	PAN Air	SKYJET	Spain	
9Q	PBA	PB Air	PEEBEE AIR	Thailand	
	PDQ	PDQ Air Charter	DISPATCH	United States	
	XAS	PHH Aviation System		United States	
	PDG	PLM Dollar Group	OSPREY	United Kingdom	
PU	PUA	PLUNA	PLUNA	Uruguay	
U4	PMT	PMTair	MULTITRADE	Cambodia	Progress Multitrade
	PRP	PRT Aviation	PRONTO	Spain	
OH	JIA	PSA Airlines	BLUE STREAK	United States	part of American Airlines Group
	KST	PTL Luftfahrtunternehmen	KING STAR	Germany	
	WIS	Paccair	WISCAIR	United States	
Y5	PCE	Pace Airlines	PACE	United States	Pace Airlines was purchased by Hooters in December 2002.
	PAB	Pacific Air Boats	AIR BOATS	Canada	
	PRC	Pacific Air Charter	PACIFIC CHARTER	United States	
	PAQ	Pacific Air Express	SOLPAC	Solomon Islands	Registered Solomon Islands, main base in Brisbane, Australia
	PXP	Pacific Air Transport	PAK EXPRESS	United States	
BL	PIC	Pacific Airlines	PACIFIC AIRLINES	Vietnam	
	PAK	Pacific Alaska Airlines	PACIFIC ALASKA	United States	
	PCV	Pacific Aviation (Australia)	PACAV	Australia	
	PTO	European Flight Academy / Lufthansa Aviation Training	ROOKIE	Germany	
	PCX	Pacific Aviation (United States)		United States	
DJ	PBN	Pacific Blue	BLUEBIRD	New Zealand	Controlled Dupe IATA with Virgin Australia
	PQA	Pacific Coast Airlines	SAGE BRUSH	United States	
8P	PCO	Pacific Coastal Airlines	PASCO	Canada	
Q8	PEC	Pacific East Asia Cargo Airlines	PAC-EAST CARGO	Philippines	
	PFA	Pacific Flight Services	PACIFIC SING	Singapore	
	PIN	Pacific International Airlines	ROAD RUNNERS	United States	
	PSA	Pacific Island Aviation	PACIFIC ISLE	United States	
	PCJ	Pacific Jet	PACIFIC JET	United States	
	PPM	Pacific Pearl Airways	PACIFIC PEARL	Philippines	
	PAR	Pacific Rim Airways	PACRIM	Australia	
LW	NMI	Pacific Wings	TSUNAMI	United States	
GX		Pacificair		Philippines	
	PFR	Pacificair Airlines	PACIFIC WEST	United States	
	RCY	Package Express	RACE CITY	United States	
	PAE	Paisajes Españoles	PAISAJES	Spain	
	PKW	Pak West Airlines	PLATINUM WEST	United States	
PK	PIA	Pakistan International Airlines	PAKISTAN	Pakistan	
	PKR	Pakker Avio	PAKKER AVIO	Estonia	
	LPA	Pal Aerolíneas	LINEASPAL	Mexico	
	PPC	Palau Asia Pacific Airlines	PALAU ASIAPAC	Palau	
	PNA	Palau National Airlines	SEBUS	Palau	2014
GP	PTP	Palau Trans Pacific Airlines	TRANS PACIFIC	Palau	
PF	PNW	Palestinian Airlines	PALESTINIAN	Egypt	
	JSP	Palmer Aviation	PALMER	United Kingdom	
NR	PIR	Pamir Airways	PAMIR	Afghanistan	
	PFN	Pan African Air Services	PANAFRICAN	Sierra Leone	
	ODM	Pan African Airways		Kenya	
	PAX	Pan Air	PANNEX	United States	
	XPA	Pan Am Weather Systems		United States	
7N	PWD	PAWA Dominicana		Dominican Republic	
PN		Pan American Airways		United States	defunct
PA	PAA	Pan American Airways		United States	defunct
PA	PAA	Pan American World Airways	CLIPPER	United States	defunct 1991
	PEA	Pan Europeenne Air Service		France	
	PHT	Pan Havacilik Ve Ticaret	PANANK	Turkey	
	PMA	Pan Malaysian Air Transport	PAN MALAYSIA	Malaysia	
	PNC	Pan-Air	PANAIRSA	Mexico	
	PNF	Panafrican Airways	PANWAYS	Ivory Coast	defunct
	PGI	Panagra Airways	PANAGRA	United States	
	RSL	Panama Aircraft Rental and Sales	PANAMA RENTAL	Panama	2014
	PEI	Panamedia	PANAMEDIA	Spain	
	PVI	Panavia		Panama	
	PNH	Panh	KUBAN LIK	Russia	
	PHU	Pannon Air Service	PANNON	Hungary	
	PNM	Panorama	PANORAMA	Spain	
	PAH	Panorama Air Tour	LANI	United States	
	AFD	Panorama Flight Service	AIRFED	United States	
P8	PTN	Pantanal Linhas Aéreas	PANTANAL	Brazil	
	HMP	Papair Terminal	PAPAIR TERMINAL	Haiti	
	PAI	Paradise Airways	SEA RAY	United States	
	PDI	Paradise Island Airways	PARADISE ISLAND	United States	
	PGX	Paragon Air Express	PARAGON EXPRESS	United States	
	PGF	Paragon Global Flight Support		United Kingdom	
	PRR	Paramount Airlines	PARAMOUNT	Sierra Leone	
I7	PMW	Paramount Airways	PARAWAY	India	
WE	PTA	Parata Air	PARATA AIR	Republic of Korea	
	APE	Parcel Express	AIR PARCEL	United States	
	IRE	Pariz Air	PARIZAIR	Iran	
	PRA	Pars Aviation Service	PARSAVIA	Iran	
	PST	Parsa	TURISMO REGIONAL	Panama	
	FAP	Parsons Airways Northern		Canada	
P6	PSC	Pascan Aviation	PASCAN	Canada	
P3	PTB	Passaredo Transportes Aéreos	PASSAREDO	Brazil	
	PTC	Patria Cargas Aéreas	PATRIA	Argentina	
	BYT	Patriot Aviation Limited	BYTE	United Kingdom	
	ETL	Patterson Aviation Company	ENTEL	United States	
	PHE	Pawan Hans	PAWAN HANS	India	
	IRP	Payam Air	PAYAMAIR	Iran	Air Center Service
	KGC	Peach Air	GOLDCREST	United Kingdom	
	PRL	Pearl Air	PEARL LINE	Pakistan	
	PBY	Pearl Air Services	PEARL SERVICES	Uganda	
HP	HPA	Pearl Airways	PEARL AIRWAYS	Haiti	IATA code withdrawn
	PVU	Peau Vavaʻu	PEAU	Tonga	
	PXA	Pecotox Air	PECOTOX	Moldova	
PC	PGT	Pegasus Airlines	SUNTURK	Turkey	WAS 1I, H9
PE	PEV	People's	PEOPLES	Austria	Previously used by Pegaviation, and PeopleExpress (US low cost carrier 1981-87)
1I		Pegasus Hava Tasimaciligi	Sunturk	Turkey	
	HAK	Pegasus Helicopters	HELIFALCON	Norway	
	PDF	Pelican Air Services	PELICAN AIRWAYS	South Africa	
	PEX	Pelican Express	PELICAN EXPRESS	United States	
	PAS	Pelita Air Service	PELITA	Indonesia	
	PEM	Pem-Air	PEM-AIR	Canada	
	PDY	Pen-Avia	PENDLEY	United Kingdom	
KS	PEN	Peninsula Airways	PENINSULA	United States	
	PNE	Peninter Aérea	PENINTER	Mexico	
	PCA	Penya De L'Aire	PENA DEL AIRE	Spain	
	CVT	Peran	CVETA	Kazakhstan	
	PCC	Perforadora Central	PERFORADORA CENTRAL	Mexico	
	PAG	Perimeter Aviation	PERIMETER	Canada	
P9	PGP	Perm Airlines	PERM AIR	Russia	
	PPQ	Personas Y Pasquetes Por Air	PERSONSPAQ	Mexico	
P9	PVN	Peruvian Airlines		Peru	
	FPR	Peruvian Air Force		Peru	Fuerza Aérea Del Perú
	INP	Peruvian Navy		Peru	
	PEO	Petro Air	PETRO AIR	Libya	
	PMX	Petroleos Mexicanos	PEMEX	Mexico	
	PHM	Petroleum Helicopters	PETROLEUM	United States	
	PHC	Petroleum Helicopters de Colombia	HELICOPTERS	Colombia	
	PTK	Petropavlovsk-Kamchatsk Air Enterprise	PETROKAM	Russia	
	PTY	Petty Transport	PETTY	United States	
	PHV	Phenix Aviation	NEW BIRD	France	
	PMY	Phetchabun Airline	PHETCHABUN AIR	Thailand	
Z2	APG	Philippines AirAsia	COOL RED	Philippines	
PR	PAL	Philippine Airlines	PHILIPPINE	Philippines	
	PHI	Philips Aviation Services	PHILAIR	Netherlands	ICAO code and call sign no longer allocated
	BCH	Phillips Air	BEACHBALL	United States	
	PDD	Phillips Alaska	PADA	United States	
	PHL	Phillips Michigan City Flying Service	PHILLIPS	United States	
	PHB	Phoebus Apollo Aviation	PHOEBUS	South Africa	
	KZM	Phoebus Apolloa Zambia	CARZAM	Zambia	
	PHA	Phoenix Air Group	GRAY BIRD	United States	
	PHN	Phoenix Air Lines	PHOENIX BRASIL	Brazil	
	PAM	Phoenix Air	PHOENIX	Germany	
	PPG	Phoenix Air Transport	PAPAGO	United States	
	WDY	Phoenix Airline Services	WINDYCITY	United States	
HP		Phoenix Airways		Switzerland	
	PHY	Phoenix Avia	PHOENIX ARMENIA	Armenia	
	PHG	Phoenix Aviation	PHOENIX GROUP	Kyrgyzstan	
	XPX	Phoenix Flight Operations		United States	
9R	VAP	Phuket Air	PHUKET AIR	Thailand	
PI	PAI	Piedmont Airlines (1948-1989)	PIEDMONT	United States	defunct
PT	PDT	Piedmont Airlines	PIEDMONT	United States	part of American Airlines Group
	PCH	Pilatus Flugzeugwerke	PILATUS WINGS	Switzerland	
	PLU	Pilatus PC-12 Center De Mexico	PILATUS MEXICO	Mexico	
	MKS	Pimichikamac Air	MIKISEW	Canada	
	PNP	Pineapple Air	PINEAPPLE AIR	Bahamas	
	PIM	Pinframat	PINFRAMAT	Angola	
	PCL	Pinnacle Air Group	PINNACLE GROUP	United States	
9E	FLG	Pinnacle Airlines	FLAGSHIP	United States	
	PIO	Pioneer Airlines	PIONEER	United States	
	PER	Pioneers Limited		Pakistan	
	PRN	Pirinair Express	PRINAIR EXPRESS	Spain	
	PLN	Planar	PLANAR	Angola	
	PMS	Planemaster Services	PLANEMASTER	United States	
	PLZ	Planet Airways	PLANET	United States	
OG	FPY	Play	PLAYER	Iceland	
	PYZ	Players Air	PLAYERS AIR	United States	
	LIB	Polizeihubschrauberstaffel Hamburg	LIBELLE	Germany	
	PSF	Plymouth School of Flying	LIZARD	United Kingdom	
DP	PBD	Pobeda	POBEDA	Russia	
	POC	Pocono Air Lines	POCONO	United States	
	PDA	Podilia-Avia	PODILIA	Ukraine	
	PAZ	Point Afrique Niger	POINTAIR NIGER	Niger	
	RMI	Point Airlines	POINT AIRLINE	Nigeria	
	PAW	Pointair Burkina	POINTAIR BURKINA	Burkina Faso	
	PTS	Points of Call Airlines	POINTSCALL	Canada	
PO	PAC	Polar Air Cargo	POLAR	United States	
	PMO	Polar Airlines de Mexico	POLAR MEXICO	Mexico	
	PSR	Polestar Aviation	POLESTAR	United Kingdom	
	POT	Polet Flight	POLET	Russia	
	POF	Police Aux Frontières	AIRPOL	France	
	PLC	Police Aviation Services	SPECIAL	United Kingdom	
	PLF	Polish Air Force	POLISH AIRFORCE	Poland	
	PNY	Polish Navy	POLISH NAVY	Poland	
	NRW	Polizeifliegerstaffel Nordrhein-Westfalen	HUMMEL	Germany	
	PPH	Polizeihubschrauberstaffel Niedersachsen	POLICE PHOENIX	Germany	
	PIK	Polizeihubschrauberstaffel Sachsen-Anhalt	POLICE IKARUS	Germany	
	SRP	Polizeihubschauberstaffel Rheinland-Pfalz	SPERBER	Germany	
	PBW	Polizeihubschrauberstaffel Baden-Württemberg	BUSSARD	Germany	
	EDL	Polizeihubschrauberstaffel Bayern	POLICE EDELWEISS	Germany	
	PBB	Polizeihubschrauberstaffel Brandenburg	ADEBAR	Germany	
	PHH	Polizeihubschrauberstaffel Hessen	IBIS	Germany	
	PMV	Polizeihubschrauberstaffel Mecklenburg-Vorpommern	POLICE MERLIN	Germany	
	PHS	Polizeihubschrauberstaffel Sachsen	PASSAT	Germany	
	HBT	Polizeihubschrauberstaffel Thüringen	HABICHT	Germany	
	CUK	Polo Aviation	CHUKKA	United Kingdom	
	PLA	Polynesian Air-Ways	POLYAIR	United States	
PH	PAO	Polynesian Airlines	POLYNESIAN	Samoa	
DJ	PLB	Polynesian Blue	POLYBLUE	New Zealand	Controlled Dupe IATA, Code reserved but not in use, PBN (Bluebird) used.
1U		Polyot Sirena		Russia	
	PND	Pond Air Express	POND AIR	United States	
	PSI	Pont International Airline Services	PONT	Suriname	defunct
	PLX	Pool Aviation	POOLEX	United Kingdom	
	PTQ	Port Townsend Airways	TOWNSEND	United States	
	POR	Porteadora De Cosola	PORTEADORA	Mexico	
P3	PTR	Porter Airlines	PORTER	Canada	
NI	PGA	Portugalia	PORTUGALIA	Portugal	
	AFP	Portuguese Air Force	PORTUGUESE AIR FORCE	Portugal	
	POA	Portuguese Army	PORTUGUESE ARMY	Portugal	
	PON	Portuguese Navy	PORTUGUESE NAVY	Portugal	
M4	MSA	Poste Air Cargo	AIRMERCI	Italy	
BK	PDC	Potomac Air	DISTRICT	United States	
	PSN	Potosina Del Aire	POTOSINA	Mexico	
	PWL	Powell Air	POWELL AIR	Canada	
	PFS	Prairie Flying Service	PRAIRIE	United States	
	PWC	Pratt and Whitney Canada	PRATT	Canada	
PW	PRF	Precision Air	PRECISION AIR	Tanzania	
	PRE	Precision Airlines	PRECISION	United States	
	BAT	Premiair	BALLISTIC	Luxembourg	
	PGL	Premiair Aviation Services	PREMIERE	United Kingdom	
	PME	Premiair Flying Club	ADUR	United Kingdom	
	EMI	Premium Air Shuttle	BLUE SHUTTLE	Nigeria	
	PMU	Premium Aviation	PREMIUM	Germany	
	BFA	Presidence Du Faso		Burkina Faso	
	ONM	Presidencia de La Republica de Guinea Ecuatorial		Equatorial Guinea	
TO	PSD	President Airlines		Cambodia	
MO	AUH	Presidential Flight	SULTAN	United Arab Emirates	Presidential flight
	PRD	Presidential Aviation	PRESIDENTIAL	United States	
	PWA	Priester Aviation	PRIESTER	United States	
	PMM	Paradigm Air Operators	PARADIGM	United States	
FE	WCP	Primaris Airlines	WHITECAP	United States	
	PMC	Primas Courier	PRIMAC	United States	
	CRY	Primavia Limited	CARRIERS	United Kingdom	
	PRM	Prime Airlines	PRIME AIR	United States	
	PKZ	Prime Aviation	PRAVI	Kazakhstan	
	CME	Prince Edward Air	COMET	Canada	
	PJP	Princely Jets	PRINCELY JETS	Pakistan	
8Q		Princess Air			no longer assigned
	PCN	Princeton Aviation Corporation	PRINCETON	United States	
	PRY	Priority Air Charter	PRIORITY AIR	United States	
	PAT	Priority Air Transport	PAT	United States	Department of the Army
	BCK	Priority Aviation Company	BANKCHECK	United States	
	PTI	Privatair	PRIVATAIR	Switzerland	
	PJE	Private Jet Expeditions	PEE JAY	United States	
	PJA	Private Jet Management	PRIVATE FLIGHT	United States	
8W	PWF	Private Wings Flugcharter	PRIVATE WINGS	Germany	
P6	PVG	Privilege Style	PRIVILEGE	Spain	
	PRH	Pro Air	PROHAWK	United States	
	PSZ	Pro Air Service	POP-AIR	United States	
	GIY	Probiz Guinee	PROBIZ	Guinea	
	PAD	Professional Express Courier Service	AIR PROFESSIONAL	United States	
	PVL	Professione VOlare	VOLARE	Italy	
P0	PFZ	Proflight Zambia	PROFLIGHT-ZAMBIA	Zambia	
	PTT	Promotora Industria Totolapa	TOTOLAPA	Mexico	
	PRO	Propair	PROPAIR	Canada	
	PPA	Propheter Aviation	AIR PROP	United States	
	PTH	Proteus Helicopteres	PROTEUS	France	
	PTL	Providence Airline	PLANTATION	United States	
	AWD	Providence Aviation Services		Pakistan	
PB	SPR	Provincial Airlines	SPEEDAIR	Canada	
	PRV	Provincial Express	PROVINCIAL	Canada	
	PSW	Pskovavia	PSKOVAVIA	Russia	
	UDA	Psudiklat Perhubungan Udara/PLP	UDARA	Indonesia	
	PTA	Ptarmigan Airways	PTARMIGAN	Canada	
	PSP	Publiservicios Aéreos	PUBLISERVICIOS	Mexico	
	PUV	Publivoo	PUBLIVOO	Portugal	Publicidade e Imagens Aéreas
	PNG	Puerto Rico National Guard		United States	
	TXV	Puerto Vallarta Taxi Aéreo	TAXIVALLARTA	Mexico	
	PGH	Pulkovo Aircraft Services		Russia	
	PLY	Puma Linhas Aéreas	PUMA BRASIL	Brazil	
	PTV	Puntavia Air Services	PUNTAVIA	Djibouti	
	MGO	Punto Fa	MANGO	Spain	
	PYR	Pyramid Air Lines	PYAIR	Egypt	
FV	PLK	Pulkovo Aviation Enterprise	PULKOVO	Russia	defunct merged into Rossiya
	PRI	Primera Air Scandinavia	PRIMERA	Denmark	
	PRW	Primera Air Nordic	JETBIRD	Latvia	
	FQA	Quikjet Airlines	QUIK LIFT	India	2014
	QQE	Qatar Executive	QREX	Qatar	
	QNT	Qanot Sharq	QANAT SHARQ	Uzbekistan	
QF	QFA	Qantas	QANTAS	Australia	
QF	QLK	QantasLink	QLINK	Australia	
	QAC	Qatar Air Cargo	QATAR CARGO	Qatar	
QR	QTR	Qatar Airways	QATARI	Qatar	
	QAF	Qatar Amiri Flight	AMIRI	Qatar	
QB	QSM	Qeshm Air	QESHM AIR	Iran	
QW	QDA	Qingdao Airlines	SKY LEGEND	China	
	QTX	Quantex Environmental	AIR QUANTEX	Canada	
	QUE	Quebec Government Air Service	QUEBEC	Canada	
	QNA	Queen Air	QUEEN AIR	Dominican Republic	
	LBQ	Quest Diagnostics	LABQUEST	United States	
	QAJ	Quick Air Jet Charter	DAGOBERT	Germany	
	QAH	Quick Airways Holland	QUICK	Netherlands	
	QAS	Quisqueya Airlines	QUISQUEYA	Haiti	
	QAQ	Qurinea Air Service	QURINEA AIR	Libya	
	QCC	Qwest Commuter Corporation	QWEST AIR	United States	
	QWA	Qwestair		Australia	
	QWL	Qwila Air	Q-CHARTER	South Africa	
	RBB	Rabbit-Air	RABBIT	Switzerland	
	ACE	Race Cargo Airlines	Fastcargo	Ghana	defunct
R6		RACSA		Guatemala	
	GBR	Rader Aviation	GREENBRIER AIR	United States	
1D		Radixx		United States	
	BKH	RAF Barkston Heath		United Kingdom	
	CFN	RAF Church Fenton	CHURCH FENTON	United Kingdom	Church Fenton Flying Training Unit
	COH	RAF Coltishall	COLT	United Kingdom	Coltishall Flying Training Unit
	CBY	RAF Coningsby	TYPHOON	United Kingdom	Coningsby Flying Training Unit
	COT	RAF Cottesmore	COTTESMORE	United Kingdom	Royal Air Force (Cottesmore Flying Training Unit) - No longer allocated
	CWL	RAF Cranwell	CRANWELL	United Kingdom	Royal Air Force (Cranwell Flying Training Unit)
	KIN	RAF Kinloss	KINLOSS	United Kingdom	Royal Air Force (Kinloss Flying Training Unit)
	LEE	RAF Leeming	JAVELIN	United Kingdom	Royal Air Force (Leeming Flying Training Unit)
	LCS	RAF Leuchars	LEUCHARS	United Kingdom	Royal Air Force
	LOP	RAF Linton-on-Ouse	LINTON ON OUSE	United Kingdom	Royal Air Force (Linton-on-Ouse Flying Training Unit)
	LOS	RAF Lossiemouth	LOSSIE	United Kingdom	Royal Air Force (Lossiemouth Flying Training Unit)
	MRH	RAF Marham	MARHAM	United Kingdom	Royal Air Force (Marham Flying Training Unit)
	NWO	RAF Northwood		United Kingdom	Royal Air Force (Northwood Headquarters)
	SMZ	RAF Scampton	SCAMPTON	United Kingdom	Royal Air Force
	STN	RAF St Athan	SAINT ATHAN	United Kingdom	Royal Air Force
	SMG	RAF St Mawgan Search and Rescue		United Kingdom	Royal Air Force
	TOF	RAF Topcliffe Flying Training Unit	TOPCLIFFE	United Kingdom	Royal Air Force
	VYT	RAF Valley Flying Training Unit	ANGLESEY	United Kingdom	Royal Air Force
	VLL	RAF Valley SAR Training Unit		United Kingdom	Royal Air Force
	WAD	RAF Waddington	VULCAN	United Kingdom	Royal Air Force (Waddington FTU)
	WIT	RAF Wittering	STRIKER	United Kingdom	Royal Air Force (Wittering FTU)
	MTL	RAF-Avia	MITAVIA	Latvia	
	WES	Rainbow International Airlines	WEST INDIAN	United States	
	RJT	RA Jet Aeroservicios	RA JET	Mexico	
	RAJ	Raji Airlines	RAJI	Pakistan	
	RKM	RAK Airways	RAKAIR	United Arab Emirates	
	RFA	Raleigh Flying Service	RALEIGH SERVICE	United States	
	REX	Ram Air Freight	RAM EXPRESS	United States	
	RMT	Ram Aircraft Corporation	RAM FLIGHT	United States	
	PPK	Ramp 66	PELICAN	United States	
	RGM	Rangemile Limited	RANGEMILE	United Kingdom	
	MWR	Raslan Air Service	RASLAN	Egypt	
	RAQ	Rath Aviation	RATH AVIATION	Austria	
	CSM	Ratkhan Air	LORRY	Kazakhstan	
	RVR	Raven Air	RAVEN	United Kingdom	
	RVN	Raven Air	RAVEN U-S	United States	Qualiflight Training
7H	RVF	Ravn Alaska	RAVEN FLIGHT	United States	2014
	REI	Ray Aviation	RAY AVIATION	Israel	
	RYT	Raya Jet		Jordan	
	RTN	Raytheon Aircraft Company	RAYTHEON	United States	
	RCJ	Raytheon Corporate Jets	NEWPIN	United Kingdom	
	KSS	Raytheon Travel Air	KANSAS	United States	
	RCB	Real Aero Club De Baleares	BALEARES	Spain	
	CDT	Real Aero Club de Reus-Costa Dorado	AEROREUS	Spain	
	RCD	Real Aeroclub De Tenerife	AEROCLUB	Spain	
	VCB	Real Aero Club de Vizcaya		Spain	
	RLV	Real Aviation	REAL	Ghana	
XW	LUV	Really Cool Airlines	REALLY COOL AIRLINE	Thailand	
	RCB	Real Aero Club De Baleares	BALEARES	Spain	
REB	Rebus	REBUS	Bulgaria		
	RTO	Rectimo Air Transports	RACCOON	France	
	RIX	Rectrix Aviation	RECTRIX	United States	
	PSH	Red Aviation	PASSION	United Kingdom	(Helidrome Limited)
	RBN	Red Baron Aviation	RED BARON	United States	
	DEV	Red Devils Parachute Display Team	RED DEVILS	United Kingdom	
	RDV	Red Sea Aviation	RED AVIATION	Egypt	
	RSV	Red Sky Ventures	RED SKY	Namibia	
	STR	Red Star	STARLINE	United Arab Emirates	
	RHC	Redhill Aviation	REDAIR	United Kingdom	
	VRD	Virgin America	REDWOOD	United States	
	RAV	Reed Aviation	REED AVIATION	United Kingdom	
	REF	Reef Air	REEF AIR	New Zealand	
V4	REK	Reem Air	REEM AIR	Kyrgyzstan	
	RVV	Reeve Aleutian Airways	REEVE	United States	defunct
	RBH	Regal Bahamas International Airways	CALYPSO	Bahamas	
	RGY	Regency Airlines	REGENCY	United States	
	RAH	Regent Air	REGENT	Canada	
RX	RGE	Regent Airways	REGENT	Bangladesh	defunct; code reassigned to Riyadh Air
	RAG	Regio Air	GERMAN LINK	Germany	
	RGR	Region Air	REGIONAIR	Canada	
YS	RAE	Régional	REGIONAL EUROPE	France	
	TSH	R1 Airlines, previously Regional 1	TRANSCANADA	Canada	
	RIL	Regional Air		Mauritania	
	REW	Regional Air Express	REGIONAL WINGS	Germany	
	REG	Regional Air Services	REGIONAL SERVICES	Tanzania	
FN	RGL	Regional Air Lines	MAROC REGIONAL	Morocco	
ZL	RXA	Rex Airlines	REX	Australia	
	JJM	Regional Geodata Air	GEODATA	Spain	
P7	REP	Regional Paraguaya	REGIOPAR	Paraguay	Defunct
3C	CEA	RegionsAir	CORP-X	United States	formerly Corporate Airlines
	REL	Reliance Aviation	RELIANCE AIR	United States	
	RLI	Reliant Air	RELIANT	United States	
	RTS	Relief Transport Services	RELIEF	United Kingdom	
	RAN	Renan	RENAN	Moldova	
QQ	ROA	Reno Air	RENO AIR	United States	defunct
	RGS	Renown Aviation	RENOWN	United States	
RC	REP	Republic Airlines	REPUBLIC	United States	defunct; 1979–1986, merged with Northwest Airlines
YX	RPA	Republic Airways	BRICKYARD	United States	
RH	RPH	Republic Express Airlines	PUBLIC EXPRESS	Indonesia	
	RBC	Republicair	REPUBLICAIR	Mexico	
	RST	Resort Air	RESORT AIR	United States	
	RUT	Reut Airways	YADID	Israel	
	RGV	RG Aviation		Venezuela	2014
	RDS	Rhoades Aviation	RHOADES EXPRESS	United States	
	RIU	Riau Airlines	RIAU AIR	Indonesia	
	RIA	Rich International Airways	RICHAIR	United States	
	RVC	Richards Aviation	RIVER CITY	United States	
	RIC	Richardson's Airway	RICHARDSON	United States	
	RCA	Richland Aviation	RICHLAND	United States	
	WHH	Richy Skylark		Sri Lanka	2014
	HPR	Rick Lucas Helicopters	HELIPRO	New Zealand	
C7	RLE	Rico Linhas Aéreas	RICO	Brazil	
	RID	Ridder Avia	AKRID	Kazakhstan	
	RAK	Riga Airclub	SPORT CLUB	Latvia	
	RAZ	Rijnmond Air Services	RIJNMOND	Netherlands	
	POL	Rikspolisstyrelsen		Sweden	
	RIM	Rimrock Airlines	RIMROCK	United States	
	SKA	Rio Air Express	RIO EXPRESS	Brazil	
	REO	Rio Airways	RIO	United States	
E2	GRN	Rio Grande Air	GRANDE	United States	defunct
RL	RIO	Rio Linhas Aéreas	RIO	Brazil	
SL	RSL	Rio Sul Serviços Aéreos Regionais	RIO SUL	Brazil	defunct
	RVM	River Ministries Air Charter	RIVER	South Africa	
	RGP	River State Government of Nigeria	GARDEN CITY	Nigeria	
	UNR	Rivne Universal Avia	RIVNE UNIVERSAL	Ukraine	
RX	RXI	Riyadh Air	RIYADH AIR	Saudi Arabia	Launching in 2025
	RDL	Roadair Lines	ROADAIR	Canada	
	RBT	Robinton Aero	ROBIN	Dominican Republic	
V2	RBY	Vision Airlines	RUBY	United States	Charter Airline and Las Vegas Tours
	ROX	Roblex Aviation	ROBLEX	United States	
	RKW	Rockwell Collins Avionics	ROCKWELL	United States	
	ROC	Rocky Mountain Airlines		Canada	
	RMA	Rocky Mountain Airways	ROCKY MOUNTAIN	United States	
	LIF	Rocky Mountain Holdings	LIFECARE	United States	
	RDZ	Rodze Air	RODZE AIR	Nigeria	
	FAD	Rog-Air	AIR FRONTIER	Canada	
	RRZ	Rollright Aviation	ROLLRIGHT	United Kingdom	
	RRL	Rolls-Royce Limited	MERLIN	United Kingdom	Military Aviation
	BTU	Rolls-Royce plc	ROLLS	United Kingdom	Rolls-Royce Bristol Engine Division
	ROF	Romanian Air Force	ROMAF	Romania	
	RMV	Romavia	AEROMAVIA	Romania	
	RNS	Ronso	RONSO	Mexico	
	ROR	Roraima Airways	RORAIMA	Guyana	
	KRS	Rosen Aviation		Japan	2014
	RNB	Rosneft-Baltika	ROSBALT	Russia	
	NRG	Ross Aviation	ENERGY	United States	
	RFS	Rossair		Australia	
	RSS	Rossair	ROSS CHARTER	South Africa	
	ROS	Rossair Europe	CATCHER	Netherlands	
FV	SDM	Rossiya	RUSSIA	Russia	Airline merged with Pulkovo Aviation Enterprise and renamed to Rossiya
	RAL	Roswell Airlines	ROSWELL	United States	
GZ	RAR	Air Rarotonga	AIR RAROTONGA	Cook Islands	
	RTR	Rotatur	ROTATUR	Brazil	
	RKT	Rotormotion	ROCKET	United Kingdom	
	JCR	Rotterdam Jet Center	ROTTERDAM JETCENTER	Netherlands	
	ROV	Rover Airways International	ROVERAIR	United States	
	VOS	Rovos Air	ROVOS	South Africa	
	RCG	Royal Air Cargo	ROYAL CARGO	South Africa	
RR	RFR	Royal Air Force	RAFAIR	United Kingdom	
RS	MJN	Royal Air Force of Oman	MAJAN	Oman	
	ACW	Royal Air Force	AIR CADET	United Kingdom	Air Cadet Schools
	RRR	Royal Air Force	ASCOT	United Kingdom	RAF HQSTC (Air Transport)
	RRF	Royal Air Force	KITTY	United Kingdom	RAF positioning flights
	SHF	Royal Air Force	VORTEX	United Kingdom	Support Helicopter Force
	RAX	Royal Air Freight	AIR ROYAL	United States	
AT	RAM	Royal Air Maroc	ROYALAIR MAROC	Morocco	
RW	RYL	Royal Air Philippines	DOUBLE GOLD	Philippines	
R0	RPK	Royal Airlines	ROYAL PAKISTAN	Pakistan	
	RLM	Royal American Airways	ROYAL AMERICAN	United States	
V5	RYL	Royal Aruban Airlines	ROYAL ARUBAN	Aruba	
	ASY	Royal Australian Air Force	AUSSIE	Australia	Used by RAAF units internationally
	RXP	Royal Aviation Express	ROY EXPRESS	Canada	
	RYB	Royal Bahrain Airlines	ROYAL BAHRAIN	Bahrain	
BI	RBA	Royal Brunei Airlines	BRUNEI	Brunei	
	KDR	Royal Daisy Airlines	DARLINES	Uganda	
	RGA	Royal Ghanaian Airlines	ROYAL GHANA	Ghana	
	ROJ	Royal Jet	ROYALJET	United Arab Emirates	
RJ	RJA	Royal Jordanian	JORDANIAN	Jordan	
	RJZ	Royal Jordanian Air Force	JORDAN AIR FORCE	Jordan	
RK	RCT	Skyview Airways	GREENSKY	THAILAND	2014
RK	RKH	Royal Khmer Airlines	KHMER AIR	Cambodia	
	RMF	Royal Malaysian Air Force	ANGKASA	Malaysia	
	NVY	Royal Navy	NAVY	United Kingdom	
	NRN	Royal Netherland Navy	NETHERLANDS NAVY	Netherlands	Koninklijke Marine
	NAF	Royal Netherlands Air Force	NETHERLANDS AIR FORCE	Netherlands	
	KIW	Royal New Zealand Air Force	KIWI	New Zealand	
	NOW	Royal Norwegian Air Force	NORWEGIAN	Norway	
	ROP	Royal Oman Police		Oman	
RL	PPW	Royal Phnom Penh Airways	PHNOM-PENH AIR	Cambodia	
	RRA	Royal Rwanda Airlines	ROYAL RWANDA	Rwanda	
	RSF	Royal Saudi Air Force	ARSAF	Saudi Arabia	
RR	RYS	Buzz (Polish airline)	MAGIC SUN	Poland	
	RSN	Royal Swazi National Airways	SWAZI NATIONAL	Swaziland	
WR	HRH	Royal Tongan Airlines	TONGA ROYAL	Tonga	
	RWE	Royal West Airlines	ROYAL WEST	United States	
	RSB	Rubystar	RUBYSTAR	Belarus	
	RLH	Ruili Airlines	SENDI	China	
	RMG	Rumugu Air & Space Nigeria	RUMUGU AIR	Nigeria	
	RUR	Rusaero		Russia	
	KLE	Rusaero		Russia	Centre for Civil Aviation Services
	CGI	Rusair JSAC	CGI-RUSAIR	Russia	
	RUH	Rusich-T		Russia	
	RLU	Rusline	RUSLINE AIR	Russia	
	MIG	Russian Aircraft Corporation-MiG	MIG AVIA	Russia	
	RFF	Russian Federation Air Force	RUSSIAN AIRFORCE	Russia	
P7	ESL	Russian Sky Airlines	RADUGA	Russia	
	RUZ	Rusuertol	ROSTUERTOL	Russia	
5R	RUC	Rutaca	RUTACA	Venezuela	
	RND	Rutland Aviation	RUTLAND	United Kingdom	
	RUA	Rwanda Airlines		Rwanda	
	RWA	Rwanda Airways		Rwanda	
WB	RWD	Rwandair Express	RWANDAIR	Rwanda	
	RWL	RWL Luftfahrtgesellschaft	RHEINTRAINER	Germany	
7S	RYA	Ryan Air Services	RYAN AIR	United States	
RD	RYN	Ryan International Airlines	RYAN INTERNATIONAL	United States	defunct 2013
FR	RYR	Ryanair	RYANAIR	Ireland	
RK	RUK	Ryanair UK	BLUEMAX	United Kingdom	
	RYZ	Ryazan State Air Enterprise	RYAZAN AIR	Russia	
	RAA	Rynes Aviation	RYNES AVIATION	United States	
	REV	RVL Group	ENDURANCE	United Kingdom	
RT	BUG	UVT Aero		Russia	
WJ	JES	Jetsmart Argentina	SMARTBIRD	Argentina	
	SRD	His Majesty's Coastguard		United Kingdom	Operates fixed- and rotary-wing assets in the maritime aerial search and rescue, contracted to private operators
	OMN	Servicios Aereos Ominia	SERVIOMNIA	Mexico	2014
	SEN	Servicios de Aviacion Sierra	SERVISIERRA	Mexico	2014
	SGC	SGC Aviation	SAINT GEORGE	Austria	2014
	SCJ	Siamjet Aviation	SIAMJET	Thailand	2014
	SIX	Sixt Rent A Car	DRIVE ORANGE	United States	2014
	SOG	Solenta Aviation Ghana		Ghana	2014
	QSR	SR Jet	SPARKLE ROLL	China	2014
	KBN	Spiracha Aviation	KABIN	Thailand	2014
	CBN	Southern Illinois University as "Aviation Flight"	CARBONDALE	United States	Allocated in 2014
	IBG	Springfield Air	ICE BRIDGE	United States	Allocated 2014
	BZQ	Seneca Polytechnic	STING	Canada	Operates as part of the Bachelor of Aviation program. Allocated 2014
	BVV	Spark+	SPARC	Russia	
	SJM	Sino Jet Management	SINO SKY	China	
	SCH	Seychelles Airlines	OCEAN BIRD	Seychelles	
	BYF	San Carlos Flight Center	BAY FLIGHT	United States	
	SXT	Servicios de Taxi Aereos	SERTAXI	Mexico	
TR	TGW	Scoot	SCOOTER	Singapore	Former IATA: TZ Former ICAO: SCO; Adopted Tigerair codes after their merger
IJ	SJO	Spring Airlines Japan	JEY SPRING	Japan	
	SBD	SIBIA Aircompany Ltd	SIBIA	Russia	
	SHT	British Airways Shuttle	SHUTTLE	United Kingdom	
6Y	ART	Smartlynx Airlines	SMART LYNX	Latvia	
	MYX	SmartLynx Airlines Estonia	TALLINN CAT	Estonia	
QS	TVS	Smartwings	SKYTRAVEL	Czech Republic	formerly named Travel Service
7O	TVL	Smartwings Hungary	TRAVEL SERVICE	Hungary	formerly named Travel Service Hungary
3Z	TVP	Smartwings Poland	JETTRAVEL	Poland	formerly named Travel Service Poland
6D	TVQ	Smartwings Slovakia	SLOVAKTRAVEL	Slovakia	formerly named Travel Service Slovakia
	DES	Servicios Aereos Especializados Destina	DESTINA	Mexico	
	LSV	Slovenian Ministry of Defence		Slovenia	
	FUF	Servicios Aereos Fun Fly	SERVIFUN	Mexico	
E3	VGO	Sabaidee Airways	VIRGO	Thailand	
	SAQ	Safe Air Company		Kenya	
	SMU	Sanborn Map Company	SPRINGER	United States	
	RBR	Siam Airnet	SIAM AIRNET	Thailand	
	SVB	Siavia	SIAVIA	Slovenia	
	MHQ	Skargardshavets Helikoptertjanst	HELICARE	Finland	
	BIS	Sky Bishek	JUMA AIR	Kyrgyzstan	
	SYH	Sky Handling		Ukraine	
GG	KYE	Sky Lease Cargo	SKY CUBE	United States	
	KPM	Sky Prim Air	SKY PRIMAIR	Moldova	
BQ	SWU	Sky Alps	SKYALPS	Italy	
	BSJ	Skybus Jet	SKYBUS JET	Bahamas	
GW	SGR	SkyGreece Airlines	SKYGREECE	Greece	Defunct; Ceased operations 27 August 2015
	USW	Special Aviation Works	AKSAR	Uzbekistan	
SH	SHA	Sharp Airlines	SHARP	Australia	Uses unregistered ICAO & IATA.
N9	SHA	Shree Airlines	SHREEAIR	Nepal	
7E	AWU	Sylt Air GmbH	SYLT-AIR	Germany	
	BDS	South Asian Airlines	SOUTH ASIAN	Bangladesh	
OL	SZB	Samoa Air	SAMOA	Samoa	
	BEC	State Air Company Berkut		Kazakhstan	
S4	RZO	SATA International	AIR AZORES	Portugal	
SA	SAA	South African Airways	SPRINGBOK	South Africa	
	KYD	Sky Messaging	SKYAD	South Africa	
	SAB	Sky Way Air	SKY WORKER	Kyrgyzstan	
KV	SKV	Sky Regional Airlines	MAPLE	Canada	
	SAC	SASCO Airlines	SASCO	Sudan	
	SAG	SOS Flygambulans	MEDICAL AIR	Sweden	
W7	SAH	Sayakhat Airlines	SAYAKHAT	Kazakhstan	
NL	SAI	Shaheen Air	SHAHEEN AIR	Pakistan	Defunct; Ceased operations on 8 October 2018
MM	SAM	SAM Colombia	SAM	Colombia	Defunct; Ceased operations on 4 October 2010
	SAN	Servicios Aéreos Nacionales (SAN)	AEREOS	Ecuador	Defunct; Ceased operations in 1999
	SAO	Sahel Aviation Service	SAVSER	Mali	
	ANX	Secretaria de Marina	SECRETARIA DEMARINA	Mexico	
	SAQ	Springbank Aviation	SPRINGBANK	Canada	
SK	SAS	Scandinavian Airlines	SCANDINAVIAN	Sweden, Denmark and Norway	
	SAV	Samal Air		Kazakhstan	
	SAW	Cham Wing Airlines	SHAMWING	Syrian Arab Republic	
SA	SAX	Sabah Air	SABAH AIR	Malaysia	
	SAY	Suckling Airways	SUCKLING	United Kingdom	Defunct; Integrated into Loganair in March 2013
	SAZ	Swiss Air-Ambulance	SWISS AMBULANCE	Switzerland	A subsidiary of Swiss Air-Rescue Rega
	SBA	SOL Linhas Aéreas	SOL	Brazil	
PI	SGU	Sol del Paraguay	SOLPARAGUAYO	Paraguay	Defunct; Ceased operations on 15 July 2011
	SBA	STA-MALI	STA-MALI	Mali	Defunct
	SBB	Steinman Aviation	SABER EXPRESS	United States	
UG	TUX	Tunisair Express	TUNEXPRESS	Tunisia	
	SBF	Seven Bar Flying Service	SEVENAIR	Tunisia	
	SBG	Sabre Incorporated		United States	
S7	SBI	S7 Airlines	SIBERIAN AIRLINES	Russia	
	SBL	Sobel Airlines of Ghana	SOBGHANA	Ghana	
Q7	SBM	SkyBahamas	SKY BAHAMAS	Bahamas	Defunct; Ceased operations on 8 July 2019
4E	SBO	Stabo Air	STABAIR	Zambia	
	SBQ	SmithKline Beecham Clinical Labs	SKIBBLE	United States	
	SBR	Saber Aviation	FREIGHTER	United States	
BB	SBS	Seaborne Airlines	SEABORNE	United States	
PV	SBU	St Barth Commuter	BLACK FIN	France	
	URJ	Star Air	STARAV	Pakistan	
S5	SDG	Star Air (India)	HISTAR	India	
JX	SJX	Starlux Airlines	STARWALKER	Taiwan	
	SBZ	Scibe Airlift	SCIBE AIRLIFT	Democratic Republic of the Congo	
	AME	Spanish Air Force	AIRMIL	Spain	
	SCA	South Central Air	SOUTH CENTRAL	United States	
	SCC	SeaCoast Airlines	SEA-COASTER	United States	
K5	SQH	SeaPort Airlines (2008–2016)	SASQUATCH	United States	Former airline: Wings of Alaska now part of SeaPort Airlines. Alternative callsign: WINGS (for VFR flights only). Former ICAO code: WAK.
YR	SCE	Grand Canyon Scenic Airlines	SCENIC	United States	
	SCF	Socofer	SOCOFER	Angola	
	SCI	Servicios Aéreos San Cristóbal	SAN CRISTOBAL	Mexico	
	SCK	Sky Cam	SKYCAM	France	
W3	SCL	Switfair Cargo	SWIFTAIR	Canada	
	SCB	Saigon Capital Aircraft Management	SAIGON	Netherlands	
	SCN	South American Airlines	SOUTH AMERICAN	Peru	
	AHI	Servicios Aéreos de Chihuahua Aerochisa	AEROCHISA	Mexico	
FP	AND	Servicios Aéreos de los Andes	SERVI ANDES	Peru	2014
	SCP	Scorpio Aviation	SCORPIO	Egypt	
	SCQ	OSM Aviation Academy	SCAVAC	Norway, Sweden and San Diego	
	SIC	SFS Aviation	SICHART	Thailand	
	SCR	Silver Cloud Air	SILVER CLOUD	Germany	
	SCS	South African Non Scheduled Airways	SOUTHERN CHARTERS	South Africa	
	SCT	SAAB-Aircraft	SAAB-CRAFT	Sweden	
	SCV	Servicios Aéreos Del Centro	SACSA	Mexico	
SY	SCX	Sun Country Airlines	SUN COUNTRY	United States	
	SDA	St. Andrews Airways	SAINT ANDREWS	Canada	
	SDB	Sukhoi Design Bureau Company	SU-CRAFT	Russia	
	SDC	Sunrise Airlines	SUNDANCE	United States	
	SDD	Skymaster Air Taxi	SKY DANCE	United States	
	SDE	Air Partners Corp.	STAMPEDE	Canada	
	SDF	Sundorph Aeronautical Corporation	SUNDORPH	United States	
	SDH	Servicio De Helicopteros	ARCOS	Spain	
	SDK	SADELCA Ltda.	SADELCA	Colombia	
	SDL	Skydrift	SKYDRIFT	United Kingdom	
	SDN	Spirit of Africa Airlines	BLUE NILE	Sudan	
	SDU	Sud Airlines	SUD LINES	France	Defunct; Ceased operations in July 2008
	SDV	Servicios Aéreos Del Vaupes	SELVA	Colombia	
	SDX	Servicio Tecnico Aero De Mexico	SERVICIO TECNICO	Mexico	
	SDZ	Sudan Pezetel for Aviation	SUDANA	Sudan	
	SEA	Southeast Air	SOUTHEAST AIR	United States	
	SEB	Servicios Aéreos Luce	SERVILUCE	Mexico	
	SED	Sedona Air Center	SEDONA AIR	United States	
	SEE	Shaheen Air Cargo	SHAHEEN CARGO	Pakistan	
	SEH	Sky Express	AIR CRETE	Greece	
SG	SEJ	Spicejet	SPICEJET	India	
	SEK	Skyjet	SKALA	Kazakhstan	
	SEL	Sentel Corporation	SENTEL	United States	
	SEO	Selcon Airlines	SELCON AIR	Nigeria	
I6	SEQ	Sky Eyes	SKY EYES	Thailand	
	SES	Servicio Aéreo Saltillo	SERVISAL	Mexico	
EH	SET	SAETA Air Ecuador	SAETA	Ecuador	Defunct; Ceased operations in February 2000
	SEV	Serair Transworld Press	CARGOPRESS	Spain	
	SFA	SEFA	SEFA	France	defunct - absorbed into École Nationale de l'Aviation Civile, with new ICAO code NAK
	SFC	Shuswap Flight Centre	SHUSWAP	Canada	
	SFE	Sefofane Air Charters	SEFOFANE	Botswana	Rebranded "Wilderness Air"
	SFF	Safewings Aviation Company	SWIFTWING	United States	
	SFG	Sun Freight Logistics	AERO GULF	Thailand	
7G	SFJ	StarFlyer	STARFLYER	Japan	
	SFL	Southflight Aviation	SOUTHFLIGHT	New Zealand	
	SFN	Safiran Airlines	SAFIRAN	Iran	
	SFP	Safe Air	SAFE AIR	Pakistan	
FA	SFR	Safair	CARGO	South Africa	
	SFS	Southern Frontier Airlines	SOUTHERN FRONTIER	Canada	
	SFT	Skyfreight	SKYFREIGHT	United States	
	SFU	Solent Flight	SAINTS	United Kingdom	
	SFX	S.K. Logistics	SWAMP FOX	United States	
	SGB	Songbird Airways, Inc.	SONGBIRD	United States	Defunct; Ceased operations on 7 February 2017
	SGC	Southern Right Air Charter	SOUTHERNRIGHT	South Africa	
	SGD	Skygate International Aviation	AIR BISHKEK	Kyrgyzstan	
	SGF	STAC Swiss Government Flights	STAC	Switzerland	
	SGH	Servisair	SERVISAIR	United Kingdom	
	SGI	Servicios Aéreos Agrícolas	SERAGRI	Chile	
	SGK	Skyward Aviation	SKYWARD	Canada	
	SGM	Sky Aircraft Service	SIGMA	Netherlands	
	SGN	Siam GA	SIAM	Thailand	Defunct; Ceased operations 30 May 2014
	SGP	Sagolair Transportes Ejecutivos	SAGOLAIR	Spain	
	SGS	Saskatchewan Government Executive Air Service	SASKATCHEWAN	Canada	
	SGT	Skygate	SKYGATE	Netherlands	
	SGU	Samgau	RAUSHAN	Kazakhstan	
	SGX	Saga Airlines		Turkey	
N5	SGY	Skagway Air Service	SKAGWAY AIR	United States	
	SHB	Shabair	SHABAIR	Democratic Republic of the Congo	
	SHC	Sky Harbor Air Service	SKY HARBOR CHEYENNE	United States	
	SHD	Sahara Airlines		Algeria	
	SHE	Shell Aircraft	SHELL	United Kingdom	
	SHG	Shoprite Group	SHOP AIR	United Kingdom	
	SHJ	Sharjah Ruler's Flight	SHARJAH	United Arab Emirates	
	SHK	Shorouk Air		Egypt	
	SHL	Samson Aviation	SAMSON	United Kingdom	
	SHM	Sheltam Aviation	SHELTAM	South Africa	
	SHN	Shaheen Airport Services	SUGAR ALFA	Pakistan	
	SHO	Sheremetyevo-Cargo		Russia	
	SHP	Service Aerien Francais	SAF	France	
	SHQ	Shanghai Airlines Cargo	SHANGHAI CARGO	China	
	SHR	Shooter Air Courier	SHOOTER	Canada	
	SHS	Shura Air Transport Services	SHURA AIR	Ethiopia	
HZ	SHU	Sakhalinskie Aviatrassy (SAT)	SATAIR	Russia	
SP	SAT	SATA Air Acores	SATA	Portugal	
8S		Scorpio Aviation			
	SHV	Shavano Air	SHAVANO	United States	
	SHW	Shawnee Airline	SHAWNEE	United States	Air South
	SHX	Slim Aviation Services	SLIM AIR	Nigeria	
ZY	SHY	Sky Airlines	ANTALYA BIRD	Turkey	
SQ	SIA	Singapore Airlines	SINGAPORE	Singapore	
5M	SIB	Sibaviatrans	SIBAVIA	Russia	
	SIE	Sierra Express	SEREX	United States	
SI	SIH	Skynet Airlines	BLUEJET	Ireland	2001–2004
	SIJ	Seco International		Japan	
3M	SIL	Silver Airways	SILVER WINGS	United States	
	SIL	Servicios Aeronáuticos Integrales	SERVICIOS INTEGRALES	Mexico	
	SIM	Star Air		Sierra Leone	
	SIO	Sirio (airline)	SIRIO	Italy	
	SIR	Salair	SALAIR	United States	
	SIS	Saber Airlines		Egypt	
XS	SIT	SITA		Belgium	
	SIV	Slovenian Armed Forces	SLOVENIAN	Slovenia	
	SIW	Sirio Executive	SIRIO EXECUTIVE	Italy	
	SJA	Servicios Aéreos Especiales De Jalisco	SERVICIOJAL	Mexico	
	SJC	Servicios Ejecutivos Continental	SERVIEJECUTIVO	Mexico	
	SJE	Sunair 2001	SUNBIZ	South Africa	
	SJJ	Spirit Aviation	SPIRIT JET	United States	
	SJL	Servicios Especiales Del Pacifico Jalisco	SERVICIOS JALISCO	Mexico	
	SJT	Swiss Jet	SWISS JET	Switzerland	
SJ	SJY	Sriwijaya Air	SRIWIJAYA	Indonesia	
ZS	SMY	Sama Airlines	NAJIM	Saudi Arabia	
	ALC	Southern Jersey Airways, Inc.	ACOM	United States	
	SPS	Spark Shuttle	Spark Shuttle	United States	
	SPT	Speed Aviation	SPEED AVIATION	Bangladesh	
	SPU	Southeast Airmotive	SPUTTER	United States	
	SPV	Servicios Privados De Aviación	SERVICIOS PRIVADOS	Mexico	
	SPW	Speedwings	SPEEDWING	Switzerland	
	SPX	Spark Express (Glow)	Glow|United States		
	SQA	Slovak National Aeroclub	SLOVAK AEROCLUB	Slovakia	
SQ	SQC	Singapore Airlines Cargo	SINGCARGO	Singapore	
	SQF	Slovak Air Force	SLOVAK AIRFORCE	Slovakia	
	SQL	Servicos De Alquiler	ALQUILER	Mexico	
	SRA	Sair Aviation	SAIR	Canada	
	SRC	Searca	SEARCA	Colombia	
FT	SRH	Siem Reap Airways	SIEMREAP AIR	Cambodia	Defunct; Ceased operations on 1 December 2008
SX	SRK	Sky Work Airlines	SKYFOX	Switzerland	
SM	SRL	Swedline Express	Starline	Sweden	Ceased operations 2006
	SRL	Servicios Aeronáuticos Aero Personal	SERVICIOS PERSONAL	Mexico	
	SRN	Sirair	SIRAIR	Russia	
P8	SRN	SprintAir	SPRINTAIR	Poland	
	SRO	Servicios Aéreos Ejecutivos Saereo	SAEREO	Ecuador	
	SRQ	Cebgo	BLUE JAY	Philippines	Subsidiary of Cebu Pacific
	SRS	Selkirk Remote Sensing	PHOTO CHARLIE	Canada	
	SRU	Star Up	STAR-UP	Peru	
	SRW	Sarit Airlines	SARIA	Sudan	Currently operates as Badr Airlines with IATA code J4 and ICAO designator BDR
	SRX	Sierra Expressway Airlines	SIERRA EX	United States	
	SRZ	Strato Air Services	STRATO	South Africa	
	SSB	Sasair	SASIR	Canada	
	SSC	Southern Seaplane	SOUTHERN SKIES	United States	
	SSD	Star Service International	STAR SERVICE	France	
	SSE	Servicios Aéreos Sunset	SUNSET	Mexico	
D2	SSF	Severstal Air Company	SEVERSTAL	Russia	
	SSG	Slovak Government Flying Service	SLOVAK GOVERNMENT	Slovakia	
VD	BBB	SwedJet Airways	BLACKBIRD	Sweden	
	SSK	Skystar International	SKYSTAR	United States	
	SSO	Special Scope Limited	DOPE	United Kingdom	
	SSP	Starspeed	STARSPEED	United Kingdom	
QF	SSQ	Sunstate Airlines	SUNSTATE	Australia	Uses IATA of parent QANTAS.
	SSR	Sardinian Sky Service	SARDINIAN	Italy	
	SSS	SAESA	SAESA	Spain	
	SST	Sunwest Airlines	SUNFLIGHT	Canada	
	SSU	SASCA	SASCA	Venezuela	
5G	SSV	Skyservice Airlines	SKYTOUR	Canada	defunct
	SSW	Streamline Aviation	STREAMLINE	United Kingdom	
	SSY	Sky Aviation	SIERRA SKY	Sierra Leone	
	SSZ	Specsavers Aviation	SPECSAVERS	United Kingdom	
	STA	Star Aviation	STAR	United Kingdom	
	STB	Status-Alpha Airline	STATUS-ALPHA	Ukraine	
	STC	Stadium City Limited	STADIUM	United Kingdom	
	STD	Servicios De Aerotransportacion De Aguascalientes	AERO AGUASCALINETES	Mexico	
	STE	Semitool Europe	SEMITRANS	United Kingdom	
	STF	SFT-Sudanese Flight		Sudan	
	STG	Sedalia, Marshall, Boonville Stage Line	STAGE	United States	
	STH	South-Airlines		Armenia	
	STI	Sontair	SONTAIR	Canada	
	STJ	Sella Aviation	STELLAVIA	Netherlands	
RE	STK	Stobart Air	STOBART	Ireland	Defunct; Ceased operations on 12 June 2021
	STL	Stapleford Flight Centre	STAPLEFORD	United Kingdom	
	STO	Streamline Ops	SLOPS	Russia	
	STQ	Star Air	STERA	Indonesia	
FS	STU	Servicios de Transportes Aéreos Fueguinos	FUEGUINO	Argentina	ICAO and call sign not current
	STU	Star African Air	STARSOM	Somali Republic	
	SUU	Star West Aviation	SUNSTAR	United States	
	STV	Saturn Aviation	SATURN	United States	
	STW	South West Air Corporation	SIERRA WHISKEY	Philippines	
	STX	Stars Away Aviation	STARSAWAY	South Africa	
	STY	Styrian Airways	STYRIAN	Austria	
	SUA	Silesia Air	AIR SILESIA	Czech Republic	
	SUB	Suburban Air Freight	SUB AIR	United States	
SD	SUD	Sudan Airways	SUDANAIR	Sudan	
PI	SUF	Sun Air (Fiji)	SUNFLOWER	Fiji	
LW	FDY	Sun Air International	FRIENDLY	United States	
	SUG	Sunu Air	SUNU AIR	Senegal	
	SUH	Sun Light	LIGHT AIR	Kyrgyzstan	
	SUI	Swiss Air Force	SWISS AIR FORCE	Switzerland	
	SUK	Superior Aviation Services	SKYCARGO	Kenya	
	SUM	State Unitary Air Enterprise	SUMES	Russia	
	SUR	Sun Air		Egypt	
EZ	SUS	Sun-Air of Scandinavia	SUNSCAN	Denmark	
	SUT	Summit Air	SUMMIT	Canada	
	URF	Surf Air	SURF AIR	United States	
	SUT	Sistemas Aeronauuticos 2000	SISTEMAS AERONAUTICOS	Mexico	
	SUV	Sundance Air	DANCEAIR	Venezuela	
SV	SVA	Saudia	SAUDIA	Saudi Arabia	
	SVD	St. Vincent Grenadines Air (1990)	GRENADINES	Saint Vincent and the Grenadines	
	SVF	Swedish Armed Forces	SWEDEFORCE	Sweden	
	AWJ	Sahel Airlines	SAHEL AIRLINES	Niger	
	SVH	Sterling Helicopters	SILVER	United Kingdom	
	SVI	Servicios De Transporte Aéreo	SETRA	Mexico	
	SVJ	Silver Air		Djibouti	
	SVL	Sevastopol-Avia	SEVAVIA	Ukraine	
	SVN	Savanair (Angola)	SAVANAIR	Angola	
	SVO	Servicios Aeronáuticos de Oriente	SERVIORIENTE	Mexico	Defunct; Ceased operations in 2002
	SVS	Servicios Aéreos Saar	AEREOS SAAR	Mexico	
	SVT	Seven Four Eight Air Services	SIERRA SERVICES	Luxembourg	
	SVX	Security Aviation	SECURITY AIR	United States	
WN	SWA	Southwest Airlines	SOUTHWEST	United States	
	SWB	Swissboogie Parapro	SWISSBOOGIE	Switzerland	
	SWC	South West Air	SAINT CLAIR	Canada	
A4	SWD	Southern Winds Airlines	SOUTHERN WINDS	Argentina	Defunct; Ceased operations 5 December 2005
	SWE	Swedeways	SWEDELINE	Sweden	
		Spurling Aviation	AIR SEATTLE	United States	Code was ASL
WG	SWG	Sunwing Airlines	SUNWING	Canada	
	SWI	Sunworld Airlines	SUNWORLD	United States	
	SWJ	StatesWest Airlines	STATES	United States	
	SWO	Surinam International Victory Airline	SIVA	Suriname	defunct
	SWP	Star Work Sky	STAR WORK	Italy	
WQ	SWQ	Swift Air (Interstate Equipment Leasing)	SWIFTFLIGHT	United States	
LX	SWR	Swiss International Air Lines	SWISS	Switzerland	
SR	SWR	Swissair	SWISSAIR	Switzerland	Defunct; Ceased operations 31 March 2002
SR	SDR	Sundair	SUNDAIR	Germany	
	SWS	Sunwest Aviation (Lindquist Investment)	SUNNY WEST	United States	Also operates under ICAO code CNK, callsign CHINOOK in Canada
	SWT	Swiftair	SWIFT	Spain	
LZ	SWU	Swiss Global Air Lines	EUROSWISS	Switzerland	Defunct; Reintegrated into Swiss International Air Lines on 19 April 2018
WV	SWV	Swe Fly	FLYING SWEDE	Sweden	
S8	SWW	Shovkoviy Shlyah	WAY AERO	Ukraine	
Q4	SWX	Swazi Express Airways	SWAZI EXPRESS	Swaziland	
WO	WSW	Swoop	SWOOP	Canada	Defunct; Integrated into WestJet on 28 October 2023
	SWY	Sky Jet	SWISSLINK	Switzerland	
	SWZ	Servair, Private Charter	SWISSBIRD	Switzerland	Code re-allocated
S8	SWZ	Skywise Airline	SKYWISE	South Africa	Defunct; Ceased operations on 10 November 2015
	SXA	Southern Cross Aviation	FERRY	United States	
	SXC	Sky Exec Aviation Services	SKY EXEC	Nigeria	
	SXE	Southeast Express Airlines	DOGWOOD EXPRESS	United States	
	SXM	Servicios Aéreos Especializados Mexicanos	SERVIMEX	Mexico	
XQ	SXS	SunExpress	SUNEXPRESS	Turkey	
	SXT	Servicios De Taxi Aéreo	SERTA	Mexico	
	SXX	Satellite Aero	SATELLITE EXPRESS	United States	
	SXY	Safari Express Cargo	SAFARI EXPRESS	Kenya	
	SYA	Skyways	LINEAS CARDINAL	Argentina	
	SYC	Systec 2000	SYSTEC	United States	
	SYE	Sheba Aviation		Yemen	
	SYF	Sky One Express Airlines	SKY FIRST	United States	
	SYG	Synergy Aviation	SYNERGY	United Kingdom	
	SYI	Sonalysts		United States	
	SYJ	Slate Falls Airways		Canada	
	SYK	Satsair	AEROCAB	United States	(J and A Properties)
	SYN	Syncrude Canada	SYNCRUDE	Canada	
RB	SYR	Syrian Arab Airlines	SYRIANAIR	Syrian Arab Republic	
	SYS	Shawbury Flying Training Unit	SHAWBURY	United Kingdom	
	SYV	Special Aviation Systems	SPECIAL SYSTEM	United States	
AL	SYX	Skywalk Airlines	SKYWAY-EX	United States	(Astral Aviation)
ZP	AZQ	Silk Way Airlines	SILK LINE	Azerbaijan	
7L	AZG	Silk Way West Airlines	SILK WEST	Azerbaijan	
	SYY	South African Historic Flight	SKY COACH	South Africa	
	SZT	Servicios Aeronáuticos Z	AERO ZEE	Mexico	
	BHV	Specavia Air Company	AVIASPEC	Russia	
	BLY	Starair	BLARNEY	Ireland	
	BNC	Sundance Air	BARNACLE AIR	United States	
E5	BRZ	Samara Airlines	BERYOZA	Russia	defunct
E5	RBG	Air Arabia Egypt	ARABIA EGYPT	Egypt	
	CBN	Swedish Civil Aviation Administration	CALIBRATION	Sweden	
SC	CDG	Shandong Airlines	SHANDONG	China	
	CDS	Spectrem Air	SPECDAS	South Africa	
	CEE	Servicios Aéreos Centrales	CENTRA AEREOS	Mexico	
	CFL	Swedish Airlines	SWEDISH	Sweden	
	CGL	Seagle Air	SEAGLE	Slovakia	
	CIG	Sirius-Aero	SIRIUS AERO	Russia	
	CNK	Sunwest Home Aviation	CHINOOK	Canada	
SK	CNO	SAS Braathens	SCANOR	Norway	
9C	CQH	Spring Airlines	AIR SPRING	China	
3U	CSC	Sichuan Airlines	SI CHUAN	China	
FM	CSH	Shanghai Airlines	SHANGHAI AIR	China	Part of China Eastern Airlines
	CSY	Shuangyang General Aviation	SHUANGYANG	China	
ZH	CSZ	Shenzhen Airlines	SHENZHEN AIR	China	
8C	CXI	Corendon Airlines Europe	TOURIST	Malta	
	DKT	Sioux Falls Aviation	DAKOTA	United States	
	DKY	Servicios Aéreos Elite	DAKOY	Spain	
	DNI	Servicios Aéreos Denim	AERO DENIM	Mexico	
	EAB	Swiss Eagle	SWISS EAGLE	Switzerland	
	EAN	Skypower Express Airways	NIGERIA EXPRESS	Nigeria	Express Airways Nigeria
	ENR	Scenic Air		Namibia	
7L	ERO	Sun D'Or	ECHO ROMEO	Israel	
NE	ESK	SkyEurope	RELAX	Slovakia	defunct
CQ	EXL	Sunshine Express Airlines		Australia	
	EXY	South African Express	EXPRESSWAYS	South Africa	
	FFD	Stuttgarter Flugdienst	FIRST FLIGHT	Germany	
	FFH	Shalom Air Services	PEACE AIR	Nigeria	
	FJE	Silverjet	ENVOY	United Kingdom	
	FLH	Sky Bus	MILE HIGH	United States	
	GAD	South Coast Aviation	SOUTHCOAST	United Kingdom	
	GDE	Servicios Aéreos Gadel	GADEL	Mexico	
	GDG	S.P. Aviation	GOLDEN GATE	United States	
	GIK	Seba Airlines	SEBA	Guinea	
	GNA	Servicios Aéreos Gana	SERVIGANA	Mexico	
	GSW	Sky Wings Airlines		Greece	
	GXL	Star XL German Airlines	STARDUST	Germany	
	HAU	Skyhaul	SKYHAUL	Japan	
	HIP	Starship	STARSA	Mexico	
	HJE	Servicios Ejecutivos Gosa	GOSA	Mexico	
SO	HKA	Superior Aviation	SPEND AIR	United States	
	HLO	Samaritan Air Service	HALO	Canada	
KI	SJB	SKS Airways	SOUTHER TIGER	Malaysia	Operates scheduled flights to outlying islands from Subang Airport to Redang and Tioman.
	HRI	Skyraidybos Mokymo Centras	HELIRIM	Lithuania	
	HSK	Sky Europe Airlines	MATRA	Slovakia	
	HSV	Svenska Direktflyg	HIGHSWEDE	Sweden	
	HSY	Sky Helicopteros	HELISKY	Spain	
TE	IGA	Skytaxi	IGUANA	Poland	
	IJS	Silvair		United States	
	ILS	Servicios Aéreos Ilsa	SERVICIOS ILSA	Mexico	
	INK	Sincom-Avia	SINCOM AVIA	Ukraine	
	IRV	Safat Airlines	SAFAT AIR	Iran	
	IRZ	Saha Airlines Services	SAHA	Iran	
	JAM	Sunline Express	SUNTRACK	Kenya	
	JCM	Secure Air Charter	SECUREAIR	United States	
	JIM	Sark International Airways	SARK	United Kingdom	
JK	JKK	Spanair	SPANAIR	Spain	defunct
	KKS	Salem	KOKSHE	Kazakhstan	
	KOP	Servicios Aéreos Copters	COPTERS	Chile	
	KSP	Servicios Aéreos Expecializados En Transportes Petroleros	SAEP	Colombia	
	KYR	Sky Aeronautical Services	SKY AERONAUTICAL	Mexico	
	LGU	Servicios Aéreos Ejecutivos De La Laguna	LAGUNA	Mexico	
	LLA	Servico Leo Lopex	LEO LOPOZ	Mexico	
	LLS	Servicios Aéreos Estrella	SERVIESTRELLA	Mexico	
	LMG	South African Air Force	SOUTH AFRICAN	South Africa	
	LMO	Sky One Holdings as Privaira	SKY HOLDINGS	United States	Callsign and company name changed from Sky Limo Corporation "SKY LIMO" in 2015.
RZ*	LRS	Sansa		Costa Rica	
	LSP	Spectrum Aviation Incorporated	AIR TONY	United Kingdom	
	MCG	SOS Helikoptern Gotland	MEDICOPTER	Sweden	
	MDT	Sundt Air	MIDNIGHT	Norway	
	MLO	Servicios Aéreos Milenio	MILENIO	Mexico	
	MMS	SAAD (A320) Limited	MUSAAD AIR	Cayman Islands	
	MRI	Servicios Aéreos Moritani	MORITANI	Mexico	
2G*	MRR	San Juan Airlines	MARINER	United States	
	MSG	Servico Aéreo Regional	SAR-REGIONAL	Mozambique	
	MSP	Servicio De Vigilancia Aérea Del Ministerio De Seguridad Pública	SEGURIDAD	Costa Rica	
	MTG	Servicios Aéreos MTT		Mexico	
1Z	APD	Sabre Pacific		Australia	
1S		Sabre		United States	
1I		Sierra Nevada Airlines		United States	
1H		Siren-Travel		Russia	
1Q		Sirena		Russia	
	SBW	Snowbird Airlines	SNOWMAN	Finland	
1K		Southern Cross Distribution		Australia	
1K		Sutra		United States	
2C		SNCF		France	
2S		Star Equatorial Airlines		Guinea	
	NAD	Seulawah Nad Air	SEULAWAH	Indonesia	
	NAZ	Servicios Aéreos del Nazas S.A. de C.V.	NAZAS	Mexico	
	NCS	Simpson Air Ltd	COMMUTER-CANADA	Canada	
NK	NKS	Spirit Airlines	SPIRIT WINGS	United States	
	NON	Servicios Aéreos Latinoamericanos	SERVICIOS LATINO	Mexico	
	NRZ	Servicios Aéreos Monarrez	MONARREZ	Mexico	
	NSC	Societe De Transport Aerien De Mauritanie	TRANS-SOCIETE	Mauritania	
	NSE	SATENA	SATENA	Colombia	
	NTB	Servicios Aéreos Del Norte	SERVINORTE	Mexico	
	NTG	Servicios Integrales De Aviación	INTEGRALES	Mexico	
S0	OKS	Slok Air Gambia	SLOK GAMBIA	Gambia	
	OKT	Soko Aviation	SOKO AIR	Spain	
	OLC	Solar Cargo	SOLARCARGO	Venezuela	
	OLO	Soloflight Aviation	SOLO	United Kingdom	Defunct; Dissolved 20 July 2010
	ONG	Sonnig SA	SONNIG	Switzerland	
SO	OSL	Sosoliso Airlines	SOSOLISO	Nigeria	Defunct; Ceased operations in 2006
	OSS	Servicios Aéreos Noticiosos	NOTICIOSOS	Mexico	
	OTL	South Airlines	SOUTHLINE	Ukraine	
VA	VOZ	Virgin Australia Regional Airlines	VELOCITY	Australia	Operated under Virgin Australia
	PIV	Sokol	AEROSOKOL	Russia	
	PLT	South Carolina Aeronautics Commission	PALMETTO	United States	
	PMR	Servicios Aéreos Premier	SERVICIOS PREMIER	Mexico	
	PNS	Survey Udara (Penas)	PENAS	Indonesia	
	POB	Servicios Aéreos Poblanos	POBLANOS	Mexico	
5S	PSV	Servicios Aéreos Profesionales	PROSERVICIOS	Dominican Republic	
	PTM	Southeastern Airways	POSTMAN	United States	
	PUR	Spurwing Airlines	SPURWING	South Africa	
1I	PZR	Sky Trek International Airlines	PHAZER	United States	
	RBW	Shandong Airlines Rainbow Jet	CAI HONG	China	
	REJ	SA Airlink Regional	REGIONAL LINK	South Africa	
	RER	Servicio Aéreo Regional Regair	REGAIR	Ecuador	
	RFT	Scoala Superioara De Aviatie Civila	ROMANIAN ACADEMY	Romania	
	RGC	Servicios Aéreos Regiomontanos	REGIOMONTANO	Mexico	
	RLS	S-Air	S-AIRLINES	Russia	
	RMP	Servicios De Rampa Y Mostrador	SERAMSA	Mexico	
	RSE	SNAS Aviation	RED SEA	Saudi Arabia	
SX	SKB	Skybus Airlines	SKYBUS	United States	defunct
	SKC	Skymaster Airlines	SKYMASTER AIR	Brazil	
	SKD	Sky Harbor Air Service	SKY DAWG	United States	
	SKE	Sky Tours	SKYISLE	United States	
	AZG	Sakaviaservice	SAKSERVICE	Georgia	Defunct
	SKF	Skycraft	SKYCRAFT	United States	
	SKG	Skycraft Air Transport	SKYCRAFT-CANADA	Canada	
RU	SKI	SkyKing Turks and Caicos Airways	SKYKING	Turks and Caicos Islands	IATA was QW
	SKK	Skylink Aviation	SKYLINK	Canada	
	SKL	Skycharter (Malton)	SKYCHARTER	Canada	
	SKN	Skyline Aviation Services	SKYLINER	United States	
	SKO	Scottish Airways Flyers	SKYWORK	United Kingdom	
	SKR	Skyscapes Air Charters	SKYSCAPES	South Africa	
	SKS	Sky Service	SKY SERVICE	Belgium	Callsign re-allocated
	SKS	Sky Link Aviation		Pakistan	
S3	BBR	Santa Barbara Airlines	SANTA BARBARA	Venezuela	
XT	SKT	SkyStar Airways	SKY YOU	Thailand	
H2	SKU	Sky Airline	AEROSKY	Chile	
OO	SKW	SkyWest Airlines	SKYWEST	United States	
JZ	SKX	Skyways Express	SKY EXPRESS	Sweden	Ceased operations 2012; Operations continue as Avia Express
BC	SKY	Skymark Airlines	SKYMARK	Japan	
	SKZ	Skyway Enterprises	SKYWAY-INC	United States	
LJ	SLA	Sierra National Airlines	SELAIR	Sierra Leone	
	SLB	Slok Air	SLOK AIR	Nigeria	
	SLD	Silver Air	SILVERLINE	Czech Republic	
	SLE	Streamline	SLIPSTREAM	South Africa	
	SLF	Starfly	ELISTARFLY	Italy	
	SLG	Saskatchewan Government	LIFEGUARD	Canada	Air Ambulance Service
	SLH	Silverhawk Aviation	SILVERHAWK	United States	
	AGE	Servicios Aéreos de Los Ángeles	AEROANGEL	Mexico	
MI	SLK	SilkAir	SILKAIR	Singapore	Merged with Singapore Airlines
6Q	SLL	Slovak Airlines	SLOV LINE	Slovakia	Defunct; Ceased operations in February 2007
PY	SLM	Surinam Airways	SURINAM	Suriname	
	SLN	Sloane Aviation	SLOANE	United Kingdom	
	SLP	Salpa Aviation	SALPA	Sudan	
	SLS	Servicios Aéreos Slainte	SERVICIOS SLAINTE	Mexico	
	SLV	Stella Aviation	AVISTELLA	Mauritania	
	SLW	Salama Airlines Nigeria	SALMA AIR	Nigeria	
	SLX	Sete Linhas Aéreas	SETE	Brazil	
	SLY	Sky Line for Air Services	SKYCO	Sudan	
	SLZ	Super Luza	LUZA	Angola	
	SMA	SMA Airlines	SESAME	Nigeria	
	SMC	Sabang Merauke Raya Air Charter	SAMER	Indonesia	Defunct; Ceased operations in 2011
	SMD	Servicios Aéreos La Marquesa	SERVICIOS MARQUESA	Mexico	
8D		Servant Air		United States	
	SME	Semos	SEMICH	Kazakhstan	
	SMF	Smalandsflyg	GORDON	Sweden	
	SMH	Smithair	SMITHAIR	United States	
E8	SMK	Semeyavia	ERTIS	Kazakhstan	Defunct; Ceased operations in July 2013
	SML	Smith Air (1976)	SMITH AIR	Canada	
	SMQ	Samar Air	SAMAR AIR	Tajikistan	
	SMR	Somon Air	SOMON AIR	Tajikistan	
	SMT	Skyline	SKYLIMIT	Nigeria	
	AOS	Servicios Aéreos Del Sol, S.A. de C.V.	AEROSOL	Mexico	
	SNA	Senator Aviation Charter	SENATOR	Germany	
NB	SNB	Sterling Airlines	STERLING	Denmark	Defunct; Ceased operations on 29 October 2008
	SNE	Servicios Aéreos De Nicaragua (SANSA)	SANSA	Nicaragua	
	SNF	Shans Air	SHANS AIR	Russia	
	SNH	Senair Services	SENSERVICE	Senegal	
	SNI	Savanah Airlines	SAVANAHLINE	Nigeria	Defunct; Prohibited from operating in 2007
6J	SNJ	Solaseed Air	NEWSKY	Japan	
SL	SNK	Southeast Airlines (Sun Jet International)	SUN KING	United States	Defunct; Ceased operations on 30 November 2004
	SNL	Soonair Lines	SOONAIR	United States	
	SNM	Servizi Aerei	SERVIZI AEREI	Italy	
	SNP	Sun Pacific International	SUN PACIFIC	United States	
	SNQ	Sun Quest Executive Air Charter	EXECU-QUEST	United States	
	SNS	Societe Centrafricaine De Transport Aerien		Central African Republic	
	SNT	Suncoast Aviation	SUNCOAST	United States	
	SNU	Snunit Aviation		Israel	
	SNV	Sudanese States Aviation	SUDANESE	Sudan	
	SNW	Sun West Airlines	SUN WEST	United States	
	SNX	Sun Air Aviation Services	SUNEX	Canada	
	SOB	Stabo Freight	STABO	Zambia	
	SOC	Southern Cargo Air Lines		Russia	
	SOH	Southern Ohio Aviation Sales	SOUTHERN OHIO	United States	
	SOI	Southern Aviation	SOAVAIR	Zambia	
IE	SOL	Solomon Airlines	SOLOMON	Solomon Islands	
	SOM	Somali Airlines	SOMALAIR	Somali Republic	
	SON	Sunshine Air Tours	SUNSHINE TOURS	United States	
	SOO	Southern Air	SOUTHERN AIR	United States	Defunct; Purchased by Atlas Air in 2016 and fully integrated on 17 November 2021
ZS	SOP	Solinair	SOLINAIR	Slovenia	
	SOR	Sonair Servico Aéreo	SONAIR	Angola	
	SOT	Southeast Correct Craft	SOUTH COURIER	United States	
9X	SOU	Southern Airways	SOUTHERN EXPRESS	United States	
6W	SOV	Saratov Airlines Joint Stock Company	SARATOV AIR	Russia	
	SOW	Sowind Air	SOWIND	Canada	Defunct - code reallocated
	SOW	White Sparrow GmbH	SPARROW	Austria	
	SOX	Solid Air	SOLIDAIR	Netherlands	
HZ	SOZ	Sat Airlines	SATCO	Kazakhstan	
	SPA	Sierra Pacific Airlines	SIERRA PACIFIC	United States	
	SPB	Springbok Classic Air	SPRING CLASSIC	South Africa	
	SPC	Spark Air Cargo	Spark Cargo	United States	
	SPE	Sprague Electric Company	SPRAGUE	United States	
	SPF	Space World Airline	SPACE WORLD	Nigeria	
	SPG	Springdale Air Service	SPRING AIR	United States	
	SPH	Sapphire Executive Air	SAPPHIRE-CHARTER	South Africa	
HK	SPI	South Pacific Island Airways	SOUTH PACIFIC	United States	Defunct; Ceased operations in 1987
	SPK	Spark Airlines	SPARK	United States	
	SPL	Servicios Corporativos Aéreos De La Laguna	CORPORATIVOS LAGUNA	Mexico	
	SPN	Skorpion Air	AIR SKORPIO	Bulgaria	
	SPP	Sapphire Aviation	SAPPHIRE	United States	
	SPQ	Servicios Aéreos Palenque	SERVICOS PALENQUE	Mexico	
	TBS	Servicios Aéreos Tribasa	TRIBASA	Mexico	
S5	TCF	Shuttle America	MERCURY	United States	Defunct; Merged into Republic Airways on 31 January 2017
	SVV	SALTAVIATION	SALT	Poland	
	TGT	SAAB Nyge Aero	TARGET	Sweden	
	THB	Spark Air	THAI SABAI	Thailand	
	TIH	S C Ion Tiriac	TIRIAC AIR	Romania	
	TRL	Starlite Aviation	STARSTREAM	South Africa	
	TRN	Servicios Aéreos Corporativos	AEROTRON	Mauritania	
	TTM	Societe Tout Transport Mauritanien	TOUT-AIR	Mauritania	
	TZU	Servicios Aéreos Tamazula	TAMAZULA	Mexico	
	UGP	Shar Ink	SHARINK	Russia	Defunct; Ceased operations in 2019
	UKU	Second Sverdlovsk Air Enterprise	PYSHMA	Russia	
	UNT	Servicios Aéreos Universitarios	UNIVERSITARIO	Mexico	
	USK	Skif-Air	SKIF-AIR	Ukraine	
	USN	Smarkand Aero Servise	SAMAS	Uzbekistan	
C7	UZS	Samarkand Airways	SOGDIANA	Uzbekistan	
	VDO	Servicios Aéreos Avandaro	AVANDARO	Mexico	
	VGS	Stichting Vliegschool 16Hoven	SMART	Netherlands	
	VRB	Silverback Cargo Freighters	SILVERBACK	Rwanda	
	VRS	Sirvair	VAIRSA	Mexico	
DV	VSV	SCAT Airlines	VLASTA	Kazakhstan	
	VXN	Sunset Aviation	VIXEN	United States	
	TWY	Sunset Aviation, LLC	TWILIGHT	United States	dba Solairus Aviation
	WCC	Sport Air Travel	WEST COAST	United States	
	WFC	Swift Copters	SWIFTCOPTERS	Switzerland	
	WLK	Skyrover CC	SKYWATCH	South Africa	
F2	XLK	Safarilink Aviation	SAFARILINK	Kenya	
	XMX	SENEAM	SENEAM	Mexico	
	XPG	Southport Air Service		United States	
	XSA	Spectrum Air Service		United States	
	XSN	Stephenville Aviation Services		Canada	
	XTA	Servicios Aéreos Textra	TEXTRA	Mexico	
	XTR	Sector Airlines	EXTER	Canada	
	XXS	Skyplan Services		Canada	
	YBE	Stewart Aviation Services	YELLOW BIRD	United States	
R1		Sirin			
	SXN	SaxonAir	SAXONAIR	United Kingdom	
O3	CSS	SF Airlines	SHUN FENG	China	
	SAF	Singapore Air Force	SINGA	Singapore	
	KFE	SkyFirst LTD	SKYFIRST	Malta	2012
PQ	SQP	SkyUp	SKYUP	Ukraine	
U5		SkyUp MT		Malta	
S5	LLC	Small Planet Airlines	SMALL PLANET	Lithuania	defunct
P7	LLP	Small Planet Airlines	SKYPOL	Poland	defunct
P2	LLI	Small Planet Airlines	AURIGA	Italy	defunct
5P	LLX	Small Planet Airlines	GERMANJET	Germany	defunct
UL	ALK	SriLankan Airlines	SRILANKAN	Sri Lanka	
DJ	SRR	Star Air	WHITESTAR	Denmark	
V9	HCW	Star1 Airlines	STAR1	Lithuania	defunct
Q4	TLK	Starlink Aviation	STARLINK	Canada	
	UFA	State Flight Academy of Ukraine	FLIGHT ACADEMY	Ukraine	
	CDL	Sunbird Airlines	CAROLINA	United States	
XG	SXD	Sunexpress Deutschland	SUNRISE	Germany	
SO	AAS	Sunshine Airlines			defunct
	RZ	Superna Airlines	YANGTZE RIVER	China	
9L	TOW	AirTanker	TOWLINE	United Kingdom	Operating the four reserve de-militarised RAF Voyager for commercial revenue
1L	OSY	Open Skies Consultative Commission	OPEN SKIES	United States	
DT	DTA	TAAG Angola Airlines	DTA	Angola	
	IRF	TA-Air Airline	TA-AIR	Iran	
	TBI	TAB Express International	TAB INTERNATIONAL	United States	
	TBM	Taban Air Lines	TABAN AIR	Iran	
	THO	TACA De Honduras	LEMPIRA	Honduras	
VR	TCV	TACV	CABOVERDE	Cape Verde	
	TDC	Tadair	TADAIR	Spain	Ceased operation in 2003
	TES	Taespejo Portugal LDA	Tesaban	Portugal	
	HET	TAF Helicopters	HELITAF	Spain	
	TSD	TAF-Linhas Aéreas	TAFI	Brazil	
	SBT	Taftan Airlines	TAFTAN	Iran	
	FPG	TAG Aviation	TAG AVIATION	Switzerland	
	TGM	TAG Aviation Espana	TAG ESPANA	Spain	
	VIP	Tag Aviation UK	SOVEREIGN	United Kingdom	
	TAG	TAG Aviation USA	TAG U-S	United States	
	FBO	TAG Farnborough Airport		United Kingdom	
TI	TWI	Tailwind Airlines	TAILWIND	Turkey	
	TIN	Taino Tours	TAINO	Dominican Republic	
	TFB	Tair Airways	ROYAL TEE-AIR	Philippines	
	TJK	Tajikair	TAJIKAIR	Tajikistan	
	TZK	Tajikistan International Airlines	TAJIKISTAN	Tajikistan	
	TKE	Take Air Line	ISLAND BIRD	France	
	JEL	Tal Air Charters	JETEL	Canada	
	TAL	Talair	TALAIR	Papua New Guinea	
	TFF	Talon Air	TALON FLIGHT	United States	
PZ	LAP	TAM Mercosur	PARAGUAYA	Paraguay	
EQ	TAE	TAME	TAME	Ecuador	Transporte Aéreos Militares Ecuatorianos
	TMI	Tamir Airways	TAMIRWAYS	Israel	
QT	TPA	TAMPA	TAMPA	Colombia	
	TNR	Tanana Air Services	TAN AIR	United States	
TQ	TDM	Tandem Aero	TANDEM	Moldova	
	HTO	Tango Bravo	HELI TANGO	France	
TP	TAP	TAP Portugal	AIR PORTUGAL	Portugal	
	UTM	TAPC Aviatrans Aircompany	AVIATAPS	Uzbekistan	
	TPS	TAPSA Transportes Aéreos Petroleros	TAPSA	Argentina	
K3	TQN	Taquan Air Services	TAQUAN	United States	
	THC	Tar Heel Aviation	TARHEEL	United States	
	TPL	TAR Interpilot	INTERPILOT	Mauritania	
	IRR	Tara Air Line	TARAIR	Iran	
	TTH	Tarhan Tower Airlines		Turkey	
RO	ROT	Tarom	TAROM	Romania	
	RMS	Tas Aviation	TASS AIR	United States	
	CTP	Tashkent Aircraft Production Corporation	CORTAS	Uzbekistan	
HJ	TMN	Tasman Cargo Airlines	TASMAN	Australia	
SF	DTH	Tassili Airlines	TASSILI AIR	Algeria	
	PGS	Tauranga Aer Club		New Zealand	
T6	TVR	Tavrey Airlines	TAVREY	Ukraine	
	TQE	Taxair Mexiqienses	TAXAIR	Mexico	
	TXL	Taxi Aéreo Cozatl	TAXI COZATL	Mexico	
	TXM	Taxi Aéreo de México	TAXIMEX	Mexico	
	TUO	Taxi Aéreo Turístico	TURISTICO	Mexico	
	XNR	Taxi Aero Del Norte	TAXI NORTE	Mexico	
	TDV	Taxi Aero Nacional Del Evora	TAXI EVORA	Mexico	
	TRF	Taxi Air Fret	TAXI JET	France	
	VRC	Taxi de Veracruz	VERACRUZ	Mexico	
	TXR	Taxirey	TAXIREY	Mexico	
	TPR	Taxis Aéreos De Parral	TAXIS PARRAL	Mexico	
	TXO	Taxis Aéreos de Sinaloa	TAXIS SINALOA	Mexico	
	TNE	Taxis Aéreos del Noroeste	TAXINOROESTE	Mexico	
	TPF	Taxis Aéreos del Pacífico	TAXIPACIFICO	Mexico	
	TMH	Taxis Turisticos Marakame	TAXIMARAKAME	Mexico	
	TYF	Tayflite	TAYFLITE	United Kingdom	
	TFY	Tayside Aviation	TAYSIDE	United Kingdom	
L6	VNZ	Tbilaviamsheni	TBILAVIA	Georgia	
	RRY	Tbilisi Aviation University	AIRFERRY	Georgia	
	TCD	Tchad Airlines	TCHADLINES	Chad	
	TIM	TEAM Linhas Aéreas	TEAM BRASIL	Brazil	
L9	TLW	Teamline Air	Teamline	Austria	
	TEM	Tech-Mont Helicopter Company	TECHMONT	Slovakia	
	TEF	Tecnicas Fotograficas	TECFOTO	Spain	
	TBN	Teebah Airlines	TEEBAH	Sierra Leone	
	THR	Tehran Airline	TEHRAN AIR	Iran	
U8	CYF	Tel Aviv Air	TUS AIR	Germany	defunct
	TCM	Teledyne Continental Motors	TELEDYNE	United States	
	TLX	Telesis Transair	TELESIS	United States	
	TEL	Telford Aviation	TELFORD	United States	
	TDE	Tellavia / Flight One	TELLURIDE	United States	
	DOT	Telnic Limited	DOT TEL	United Kingdom	
	TEH	Tempelhof Airways	TEMPELHOF	United States	
	TMS	Temsco Helicopters	TEMSCO	United States	
	TNL	Tengeriyn Ulaach Shine	SKY HORSE	Mongolia	
	TEB	Tenir Airlines	TENIR AIR	Kyrgyzstan	
	TNG	Tennessee Air National Guard 164th Airlift Group		United States	
	TEN	Tennessee Airways	TENNESSEE	United States	
	TET	Tepavia-Trans Airlines	TEPAVIA	Moldova	
	TER	Territorial Airlines	TERRI-AIRE	United States	
	TIS	Tesis	TESIS	Russia	
	TXZ	Tex Star Air Freight	TEX STAR	United States	
	TXA	Texair Charter	OKAY AIR	United States	
	TXT	Texas Air Charters	TEXAS CHARTER	United States	Group One
	TXS	Texas Airlines	TEXAIR	United States	
	CWT	Texas Airways	TEXAS AIRWAYS	United States	
	TXN	Texas National Airlines	TEXAS NATIONAL	United States	
K9	TEZ	TezJet	Tezjet	Kyrgyzstan	Started in 2014
	TGC	TG Aviation	THANET	United Kingdom	
T2	TCG	Thai Air Cargo	THAI CARGO	Thailand	
FD	AIQ	Thai AirAsia	THAI ASIA	Thailand	
XJ	TAX	Thai AirAsia X	EXPRESS WING	Thailand	
TG	THA	Thai Airways International	THAI	Thailand	
	TSL	Thai Aviation Services	THAI AVIATION	Thailand	
TXZ		Thai Express Air	EXPRESS AIR	Thailand	
	TFH	Thai Flying Helicopter Service	THAI HELICOPTER	Thailand	
	TFT	Thai Flying Service	THAI FLYING	Thailand	
	THG	Thai Global Airline	THAI GLOBAL	Thailand	
	THJ	Thai Jet Intergroup	THAI JET	Thailand	
SL	TLM	Thai Lion Mentari	MENTARI	Thailand	Associate of Lion Air
	TPV	Thai Pacific Airlines Business	THAI PACIFIC	Thailand	
9I	LLR	Thai Sky Airlines	THAI SKY AIR	Thailand	
WE	THD	Thai Smile Airways	THAI SMILE	Thailand	
T9	TSX	Thai Star Airlines	THAI STAR	Thailand	
VZ	TVJ	Thai Vietjet Air	THAIVIET JET	Thailand	
2H		Thalys		Belgium	Not an airline (train). Used for codesharing
	GFN	The 955 Preservation Group	GRIFFON	United Kingdom	
	LEG	The Army Aviation Heritage Foundation	LEGACY	United States	
	LCC	The Lancair Company	LANCAIR	United States	
HQ	TCW	Thomas Cook Airlines	KESTREL	Belgium	Defunct
MT	TCX	Thomas Cook Airlines	KESTREL	United Kingdom	
	IHS	Thryluthjonustan		Iceland	
	THU	Thunder Airlines	AIR THUNDER	Canada	
	TBD	Thunderbird Tours	ORCA	Canada	
	BLI	Thyssen Krupp AG	BLUELINE	Germany	
GS	GCR	Tianjin Airlines	BO HAI	China	
3P	TNM	Tiara Air	TIARA	Aruba	
	TBA	Tibet Airlines	TIBET	China	
	TIK	Tic Air	TICAIR	Australia	
	TJN	Tien-Shan	NERON	Kazakhstan	
TT	TGG	Tigerair Australia	TIGGOZ	Australia	Previously TGW, callsign GO CAT
	MDL	Tigerair Mandala	MANDALA	Indonesia	defunct, original airline code RI
TR	TGW	Tigerair Singapore	GO CAT	Singapore	Merged with Scoot
IT	TTW	Tigerair Taiwan	SMART CAT	Taiwan	
	MOH	Tigerfly	MOTH	United Kingdom	
	TKC	Tikal Jets Airlines	TIKAL	Guatemala	
	TMR	Timberline Air	TIMBER	Canada	
	TIE	Time Air	TIME AIR	Czech Republic	
	BOX	Tiphook PLC	BOX	United Kingdom	defunct
	TVI	Tiramavia	TIRAMAVIA	Moldova	
ZT	AWC	Titan Airways	ZAP	United Kingdom	
	TYJ	TJS Malta Ltd.	TYROLMALTA	Malta	
	TSR	TJS San Marino S.r.L.	SAN MARINO	San Marino	
	TLS	TLC Air	TEALSY	United States	
	TMM	TMC Airlines	WILLOW RUN	United States	
3V	TAY	TNT Airways	QUALITY	Belgium	
	NTR	TNT International Aviation	NITRO	United Kingdom	
	TBX	Tobago Express	TABEX	Trinidad and Tobago	
7T	TOB	Tobruk Air	TOBRUK AIR	Libya	
	TOJ	TOJ Airlines	TOJ AIRLINE	Tajikistan	
TI	TOL	Tol-Air Services	TOL AIR	United States	
	TMK	Tomahawk Airways	TOMAHAWK	United States	
	TOP	Top Air	AIR TOP	Indonesia	
	CHE	Top Flight Air Service	CHECK AIR	United States	
	TLY	Top Fly	TOPFLY	Spain	
	LKW	Top Sky International	TOPINTER	Indonesia	
	TPD	Top Speed	TOP SPEED	Austria	
	TTL	Total Linhas Aéreas	TOTAL	Brazil	
	TOT	Totavia		Canada	Aviation Information Services
	THE	Toumai Air Tchad	TOUMAI AIR	Chad	
	THF	Touraine Helicoptere	TOURAINE HELICO	France	
	~~TOW~~	Tower Air	~~TEE AIR~~	~~United States~~	Ceased operations
	TOY	Toyota Canada	TOYOTA	Canada	
	TGE	Trabajos Aéreos	TASA	Spain	
	AIM	Trabajos Aéreos Murcianos	PIJO	Spain	
	TVH	Trabajos Aéreos Vascongados	TRAVASA	Spain	
	TDR	Trade Air	TRADEAIR	Croatia	
TJ	GPD	Tradewind Aviation	GOODSPEED	United States	
	TDX	Tradewinds Airlines	TRADEWINDS EXPRESS	United States	Wrangler Aviation
	TWL	Tradewinds Aviation	TRADEWINDS CANADA	Canada	
	JCH	Trading Air Cargo	TRADING CARGO	Mauritania	
	TDO	TRADO	TRADO	Dominican Republic	Transporte Aéreo Dominicano
	TRG	TRAGSA (Medios Aéreos)		Spain	
	HBA	Trail Lake Flying Service	HARBOR AIR	United States	
	TMQ	TRAM	TRAM AIR	Mauritania	
	TMX	Tramon Air	TRAMON	South Africa	
	TRR	Tramson Limited	TRAMSON	Sudan	
	MUI	Trans Air	MAUI	United States	
	TRC	Trans Air Charter	TRACKER	United States	
	TWW	Trans Air Welwitchia	WELWITCHIA	Angola	
	TNB	Trans Air-Benin	TRANS-BENIN	Benin	
	RTM	Trans Am Compania	AERO TRANSAM	Ecuador	
	CLR	Trans America	CLINTON AIRWAYS	United States	
	TVA	Trans America Airlines	TRANS-AMERICA	United States	
	TPU	Trans American Airlines (Trans Am)	TRANS PERU	Peru	
	TRT	Trans Arabian Air Transport	TRANS ARABIAN	Sudan	
	SRT	Trans Asian Airlines	TRASER	Kazakhstan	
	TLL	Trans Atlantic Airlines	ATLANTIC LEONE	Sierra Leone	
	LTA	Trans Atlantis	LANTRA	Canada	
CB*		Trans Caribbean Air Export Import		United States	
	TCC	Trans Continental Airlines	TRANSCAL	Sudan	
	TCN	Trans Continental Airlines	TRANSCON	United States	
	TRJ	Trans Euro Air	HIGH TIDE	United Kingdom	
	TGY	Trans Guyana Airways	TRANS GUYANA	Guyana	
	THZ	Trans Helicoptere Service	LYON HELIJET	France	
	TIA	Trans International Airlines	TRANS INTERNATIONAL	United States	
	BAP	Trans International Express Aviation	BIG APPLE	United States	
	TRD	Trans Island Air	TRANS ISLAND	Barbados	
	SWL	Trans Jet Airways	TRANSJET	Sweden	
TL	TMA	Trans Mediterranean Airlines	TANGO LIMA	Lebanon	
	TMT	Trans Midwest Airlines	TRANS MIDWEST	United States	
	TNW	Trans Nation Airways	TRANS-NATION	Ethiopia	
	TNT	Trans North Turbo Air	TRANS NORTH	Canada	
	REC	Trans Reco	TRANS-RECO	Mauritania	
	SBJ	Trans Sahara Air	TRANS SAHARA	Nigeria	
	TSM	Trans Sayegh Airport Services		Lebanon	
AX	LOF	Trans States Airlines	WATERSKI	United States	
TW	TWA	Trans World Airlines	TWA	United States	
	RBD	Trans World Express	RED BIRD	United States	
UN	TSO	Transaero Airlines	TRANSOVIET	Russia	
	TNF	Transafricaine	TRANSFAS	Burkina Faso	
	TCG	Transafricaine Air Cargo	AFRICARGO	Burkina Faso	
	TFK	Transafrik International		São Tomé and Príncipe	
	TSA	Transair France	AIRTRAF	France	
	TGX	Transair Gabon	TRANSGABON	Gabon	
	TNI	Transair International Linhas Aéreas	TRANSINTER	United States	
	TSN	Trans-Air Services	AIR TRANS	Nigeria	
	TSG	Trans-Air-Congo	TRANS-CONGO	Republic of the Congo	
	KTS	Transair-Gyraintiee	KOTAIR	Russia	
	GJB	Trans-Air-Link	SKY TRUCK	United States	
	TWM	Transairways		Mozambique	
	UTT	Transarabian Transportation Services	ARABIAN TRANSPORT	Uganda	
GE	TNA	TransAsia Airways		Taiwan	defunct
	AUC	Transaustralian Air Express	AUSCARGO	Australia	Defunct
	VEN	Transaven	TRANSAVEN AIRLINE	Venezuela	
TO	TVF	Transavia France	FRANCE SOLEIL	France	
HV	TRA	Transavia Holland	TRANSAVIA	Netherlands	
	KTB	Transaviabaltika	TRANSBALTIKA	Lithuania	
AL	TXC	TransAVIAexport Airlines	TRANSEXPORT	Belarus	
	FNV	Transaviaservice	TRANSAVIASERVICE	Georgia	
	TVO	Transavio	TRANS-BALLERIO	Italy	
TR	TBA	Transbrasil	TRANSBRASIL	Brazil	defunct
	TIW	Transcarga Intl Airways	TIACA	Venezuela	
	TCE	Trans-Colorado Airlines	TRANS-COLORADO	United States	
	TCH	Transcontinental Air	TRANS GULF	Bahrain	
	KRA	Transcontinental Airlines	REGATA	Kazakhstan	
	TCT	Transcontinental Sur	TRANS-CONT	Uruguay	
	TCP	Transcorp Airways	TRANSCORP	United Kingdom	
UE	TEP	Transeuropean Airlines	TRANSEURLINE	Russia	
	TFA	Trans-Florida Airlines	TRANS FLORIDA	United States	
	TCU	Transglobal Airways Corporation	TRANSGLOBAL	Philippines	
	TXE	Transilvania Express	TRANSAIR EXPRESS	Romania	
	KCA	Trans-Kiev	TRANS-KIEV	Ukraine	
	TLA	Translift Airways	TRANSLIFT	Ireland	
	TMD	Transmandu	TRANSMANDU	Venezuela	
	TMD	Transmed Airlines		Egypt	
T9	TRZ	TransMeridian Airlines	TRANS-MERIDIAN	United States	Defunct
TH	RMY	Raya Airways	TRANSMILE	Malaysia	
	TNV	Transnorthern	TRANSNORTHERN	United States	
	TPP	Transpac Express	TRANS EXPRESS	Australia	
	PCW	Trans-Pacific Orient Airways	PACIFIC ORIENT	Philippines	
	TPM	Transpaís Aéreo	TRANSPAIS	Mexico	
	TNP	Transped Aviation	TRANSPED	Austria	
	TRM	Transport Aerien de Mauritanie	SOTRANS	Mauritania	
	TLF	Transport Africa	TRANS-LEONE	Sierra Leone	
	TGO	Transport Canada	TRANSPORT	Canada	
	TFI	Transport Facilitators		United States	
	TQR	Transportación Aérea De Querétaro	TRANSQUERETARO	Mexico	
	MCT	Transportación Aérea Del Mar De Cortés	TRANS CORTES	Mexico	
	TPN	Transportación Aérea del Norte	AEREA DELNORTE	Mexico	
	TTR	Transportaciones Y Servicios Aéreos	TRANSPORTACIONES	Mexico	
	TSI	Transport'air	TRANSPORTAIR	France	
	TCB	Transporte Aereo De Colombia	AERO COLOMBIA	Colombia	
	TAD	Transporte Aéreo Dominicano	TRANS DOMINICAN	Dominican Republic	
	TZE	Transporte Aéreo Ernesto Saenz	TRANSPORTE SAENZ	Mexico	
	TTS	Transporte Aéreo Técnico Ejecutivo	TECNICO	Mexico	
	MGM	Transporte Aero MGM	AERO EMM-GEE-EMM	Mexico	
	TMZ	Transporte Amazonair	TRANS AMAZON	Venezuela	
	TCB	Transporte del Caribe	TRANSCARIBE	Colombia	
	EAR	Transporte Ejecutivo Aéreo	EJECUTIVO-AEREO	Mexico	
	TPT	Transportes Aéreo del Sureste	TASSA	Mexico	
	MPO	Transportes Aéreos Amparo	AMPARO	Mexico	
	BOL	Transportes Aéreos Bolivianos	BOL	Bolivia	
	TDI	Transportes Aéreos de Ixtlán	TRANSIXTLAN	Mexico	
	TPX	Transportes Aéreos De Xalapa	TRANSXALAPA	Mexico	
	TMY	Transportes Aéreos del Mundo Maya	MUNDO MAYA	Mexico	
	TFO	Transportes Aéreos del Pacífico	TRANSPORTES PACIFICO	Mexico	
	DCL	Transportes Aéreos Don Carlos	DON CARLOS	Chile	
	ROU	Transportes Aéreos I. R. Crusoe	ROBINSON CRUSOE	Chile	
	TSP	Transportes Aéreos Inter	TRANSPO-INTER	Guatemala	
	MXQ	Transportes Aéreos Mexiquenses	MEXIQUENSES	Mexico	
TX	TAN	Transportes Aéreos Nacionales		Honduras	Defunct
	ELV	Transportes Aéreos Nacionales De Selva Tans	AEREOS SELVA	Peru	
	TPG	Transportes Aéreos Pegaso	TRANSPEGASO	Mexico	
	TGI	Transportes Aéreos Regionales	TRANSPORTE REGIONAL	Mexico	
	SRF	Transportes Aéreos San Rafael	SAN RAFEAL	Chile	
	RRT	Transportes Aéreos Sierra	SIERRA ALTA	Mexico	
	SEI	Transportes Aéreos Sierra Madre	TRANSPORTE SIERRA	Mexico	
	TAU	Transportes Aéreos Tauro	TRANSTAURO	Mexico	
	TPZ	Transportes La Paz	TRANSPAZ	Mexico	
OF	TML	Transports et Travaux Aériens de Madagascar	TAM AIRLINE	Madagascar	
	TPY	Trans-Provincial Airlines	TRANS PROVINCIAL	Canada	
	TTC	Transteco	TRANSTECO	Angola	
	UTN	Trans-Ulgii	TRANS-ULGII	Mongolia	defunct
	TWE	Transwede Airways	TRANSWEDE	Sweden	
9T	ABS	Transwest Air	ATHABASKA	Canada	
	TRW	Transwestern Airlines of Utah	TRANS-WEST	United States	
	TSW	Transwings	SWISSTRANS	Switzerland	
	TST	TRAST	TRAST	Kazakhstan	
S5	TSJ	Trast Aero	TRAST AERO	Kyrgyzstan	
	TSK	Trast Aero	TOMSK-AVIA	Kyrgyzstan	
	TAX	Travel Air	TRAVELAIR	United States	
	TIC	Travel International Air Charters	TRAVEL INTERNATIONAL	Zambia	
	TMC	Travel Management Company	TRAIL BLAZER	United States	
	TLV	Travelair	PAJAROS	Uruguay	
1E		Travelsky Technology		China	
	TDA	Trend Aviation	TREND AIR	United States	
	TNX	Trener Ltd	TRAINER	Hungary	
	TRU	Triangle Airline (Uganda)	TRI AIR	Uganda	
	SWD	Trifly	SAWBLADE	United States	
	TGN	Trigana Air Service	TRIGANA	Indonesia	
GY	TMG	Tri-MG Intra Asia Airlines	TRILINES	Indonesia	
	TBH	Trinity Air Bahamas		Bahamas	
T4	TIB	TRIP Linhas Aéreas	TRIP	Brazil	IATA code 8R changed to T4 (2010)
	CLU	Triple Alpha	CAROLUS	Germany	
	TTP	Triple O Aviation	MIGHTY WING	Nigeria	
	TSY	Tristar Air	TRIPLE STAR	Egypt	
	TRY	Tristar Airlines	TRISTAR AIR	United States	
	TSS	Tri-State Aero	TRI-STATE	United States	
	DRC	Triton Airlines	TRITON AIR	Canada	
	TSV	Tropair Airservices	TROPIC	United Kingdom	
PM	TOS	Tropic Air	TROPISER	Belize	
	TRO	Tropic Airlines-Air Molokai	MOLOKAI	United States	
M7	TBG	Tropical Airways		Haiti	
	TKX	Tropical International Airways	TROPEXPRESS	Saint Kitts and Nevis	
	TCA	Tropican Air Services	TROPICANA	Egypt	
	TYG	Trygg-Flyg	TRYGG	Sweden	
TZ	TDS	Tsaradia	TSARADIA	Madagascar	
	PSS	TSSKB-Progress	PROGRESS	Russia	
	TTA	TTA - Sociedade de Transporte e Trabalho Aéreo	KANIMANBO	Mozambique	
	TBR	Tubelair	TUBELAIR	Tunisia	
BY	TOM	TUI Airways	TOM JET	United Kingdom	Formerly "TOMSON"
TB	JAF	TUI fly Belgium	BEAUTY	Belgium	
X3	TUI	TUI fly Deutschland	TUI JET	Germany	
OR	TFL	TUI fly Netherlands	ORANGE	Netherlands	
6B	BLX	TUI fly Nordic	BLUESCAN	Sweden	
TD	TLP	Tulip Air	TULIPAIR	Netherlands	
	TUL	Tulpar Air	URSAL	Russia	
	TUX	Tulpar Air Service	TULPA	Kazakhstan	
	TUZ	Tuna Aero	TUNA	Sweden	
UG	TUX	Tuninter		Tunisia	
TU	TAR	Tunisair	TUNAIR	Tunisia	
	TAJ	Tunisavia	TUNISAVIA	Tunisia	
3T	URN	Turan Air	TURAN	Azerbaijan	
	TBC	Turbine Air Cargo UK		United Kingdom	
	TAC	Turbot Air Cargo	TURBOT	Senegal	
	TRQ	Turdus Airways	HUNTER	Netherlands	Defunct, ICAO code in use by another airline
	TUC	Turismo Aéreo de Chile	TURICHILE	Chile	
	THK	Turk Hava Kurumu Hava Taksi Isletmesi	HUR KUS	Turkey	
	THS	Turkish Aerospace Industries	TUSAS	Turkey	
	HVK	Turkish Air Force	TURKISH AIRFORCE	Turkey	
TK	THY	Turkish Airlines	TURKISH	Turkey	
	TRK	Turkish Airlines General Aviation	TURKISH REPUBLIC	Turkey	
T5	TUA	Turkmenistan Airlines	TURKMENISTAN	Turkmenistan	
	TLT	Turtle Airways	TURTLE	Fiji	
	USB	Tusheti	TUSHETI	Georgia	
TW	TWB	T'way Air	TWAYAIR	Republic of Korea	
	TWO	Twente Airlines	COLIBRI	Netherlands	
	TCY	Twin Cities Air Service	TWIN CITY	United States	
T7	TJT	Twin Jet	TWINJET	France	
	TNY	Twin Town Leasing Company	TWINCAL	United States	
	TWJ	Twinjet Aircraft Sales		United Kingdom	
	TYW	Tyrol Air Ambulance	TYROL AMBULANCE	Austria	
VO	TYR	Tyrolean Airways	TYROLEAN	Austria	Renamed from Austrian Arrows
	TJS	Tyrolean Jet Services	TYROLJET	Austria	
	TUM	Tyumenspecavia	TUMTEL	Russia	
VNX	TKK	flyADVANCED	TARKA	United States	Aero Ways Inc. flyADVANCED
	UEU	United European Airlines	UNITED EUROPEAN	Romania	2014
	UCG	Uniworld Air Cargo	UNIWORLD	Panama	2014
	CUH	Urumqi Airlines	LOULAN	China	2014
	DOD	USAF Air Mobility Operations Control Center		United States	
	DOI	U.S. Department of the Interior	INTERIOR	United States	Office of Aircraft Services
	CNV	U.S. Navy Reserve Logistic Air Forces	CONVOY	United States	U.S. Navy Reserve Logistic Air Forces, New Orleans, LA, USA
	EXM	United Kingdom Civil Aviation Authority	EXAM	United Kingdom	CAA Flight Examiners
	GIH	Union des Transports Africains de Guinee	TRANSPORT AFRICAIN	Guinea	
	GKA	US Army Parachute Team	GOLDEN KNIGHTS	United States	
	GWY	USA3000 Airlines	GETAWAY	United States	was U5
B7	UIA	UNI Air	GLORY	Taiwan	
	UAB	United Arabian Airlines	UNITED ARABIAN	Sudan	
UA	UAL	United Airlines	UNITED	United States	
4H	UBD	United Airways	UNITED BANGLADESH	Bangladesh	
	UAC	United Air Charters	UNITAIR	Zimbabwe	
	UCS	United Carriers Systems	UNITED CARRIERS	United States	
	UEA	United Eagle Airlines	UNITED EAGLE	China	
	UFS	United Feeder Service	FEEDER EXPRESS	United States	formerly part of United Express
	CFU	United Kingdom Civil Aviation Authority	MINAIR	United Kingdom	Civil Aviation Authority Flying Unit
	KRF	United Kingdom Royal VIP Flights	KITTYHAWK	United Kingdom	In Military Aircraft
	KRH	United Kingdom Royal VIP Flight	SPARROWHAWK	United Kingdom	In Civil Chartered Aircraft
	SDS	United Kingdom Civil Aviation Authority	STANDARDS	United Kingdom	Training Standards
	TQF	United Kingdom Royal VIP Flights	RAINBOW	United Kingdom	Helicopter Flights
	CGX	United States Coast Guard Auxiliary	COASTGUARD AUXAIR	United States	
	AGR	United States Department Of Agriculture	AGRICULTURE	United States	
	UAD	University Air Squadron		United Kingdom	MOD Boscombe Down
	UAJ	University Air Squadron		United Kingdom	Glasgow
	UAA	University Air Squadron		United Kingdom	Leuchars
	UAS	University Air Squadron		United Kingdom	RAF Cranwell
	HBU	Universal Avia	KHARKIV UNIVERSAL	Ukraine	
	HLE	UK HEMS	HELIMED	United Kingdom	
U7	JUS	USA Jet Airlines	JET USA	United States	
	LEA	Unijet	LEADAIR	France	
	MSH	US Marshals Service	MARSHALAIR	United States	US Department of Justice
	NDU	University of North Dakota	SIOUX	United States	
	PNA	Universal Airlines	PACIFIC NORTHERN	United States	
		Upali Air	UPALI	Sri Lanka	defunct
	RAU	Uganda Royal Airways	UGANDA ROYAL	Uganda	
	SAU	United Aviation Services	UNISERVE	Spain	
U6	SVR	Ural Airlines	SVERDLOVSK AIR	Russia	
	TRB	Ukraine Transavia	KIROVTRANS	Ukraine	
	UAF	United Arab Emirates Air Force	UNIFORCE	United Arab Emirates	
	UAI	Union Africaine des Transports	UNAIR	Ivory Coast	
	UCC	Uganda Air Cargo	UGANDA CARGO	Uganda	
	UCH	US Airports Air Charter	US CHARTER	United States	
	UCO	Ucoaviacion	UCOAVIACION	Spain	
	UES	Ues-Avia Aircompany	AVIASYSTEM	Ukraine	
QU	UGA	Uganda Airlines (1976–2001)	UGANDA	Uganda	Ceased operations 2001
UR	UGD	Uganda Airlines	CRESTED	Uganda	Started operations in 2019
	UGC	Urgemer Canarias	URGEMER	Spain	
	UHL	Ukrainian Helicopters	UKRAINE COPTERS	Ukraine	
	UHS	Ulyanovsk Higher Civil Aviation School	PILOT AIR	Russia	
	UJR	Universal Jet Rental de Mexico	UNIVERSAL JET	Mexico	
	UJT	Universal Jet Aviation	UNI-JET	United States	Cancelled 2014 - Renamed Journey Aviation with code JNY
	UKI	UK International Airlines	KHALIQ	United Kingdom	
	UKL	Ukraine Air Alliance	UKRAINE ALLIANCE	Ukraine	
UF	UKM	UM Airlines	UKRAINE MEDITERRANEE	Ukraine	Ukraine Mediterranean Airlines
	UKN	Ukraine Air Enterprise	ENTERPRISE UKRAINE	Ukraine	
	UKP	National Police Air Service	POLICE	United Kingdom	
6Z	UKS	Ukrainian Cargo Airways	CARGOTRANS	Ukraine	
	ULT	Ultrair	ULTRAIR	United States	
	ULH	Ultimate HELI	ULTIMATEHELI	South Africa	Ultimate HELI (Pty) Ltd
	ULR	Ultimate Air	VIPER	South Africa	Ultimate Airways (Pty) Ltd
OL	ULS	Ultra Air	AIR ULTRA	Colombia	
	UNC	Uni-Fly	UNICOPTER	Denmark	
	UNF	Union Flights	UNION FLIGHTS	United States	
	UNJ	Universal Jet	PROJET	Spain	
	UNS	Unsped Paket Servisi	UNSPED	Turkey	
	UNU	Unifly Servizi Aerei	UNIEURO	Italy	
	UPL	Ukrainian Pilot School	PILOT SCHOOL	Ukraine	
5X	UPS	United Parcel Service	UPS	United States	
	URV	Uraiavia	URAI	Russia	
US	AWE	US Airways	CACTUS	United States	defunct, merged with American Airlines in 2015
BS	UBG	US-Bangla Airlines	BANGLA STAR	Bangladesh	
	USF	USAfrica Airways	AFRICA EXPRESS	United States	
UH	USH	US Helicopter	US-HELI	United States	
	USJ	US Jet	USJET	United States	
	USX	US Express	AIR EXPRESS	United States	
QU	UTN	Skyline Express	Skyline Express Airline	Ukraine	
	TUM	UTAir	UTAIR-CARGO	Russian Federation	2014
UT	UTA	UTair Aviation	UTAIR	Russia	WAS P2 till 2006
	UTR	Utair South Africa	AIRUT	South Africa	
	UTS	Ukrainian State Air Traffic Service Enterprise	AIRRUH	Ukraine	
	UTU	Urartu-Air		Armenia	
	UVA	Universal Airways	UNIVERSAL	United States	
	UVG	Universal Airlines	GUYANA JET	Guyana	
	UVM	Uvavemex	UVAVEMEX	Mexico	
	AIO	United States Air Force	AIR CHIEF	United States	Chief of Staff
	UVN	United Aviation	UNITED AVIATION	Kuwait	
HY	UZB	Uzbekistan Airways	UZBEK	Uzbekistan	
PS	AUI	Ukraine International Airlines	UKRAINE INTERNATIONAL	Ukraine	
	WEC	Universal Airlines	AIRGO	United States	
US		Unavia Suisse		Switzerland	
	QID	USAF 100th Air Refueling Wing	QUID	United States	
	UIT	University of Tromsø School of Aviation	ARCTIC	Norway	
	UNO	United Nations	UNITED NATIONS	n/a	UNOxxx followed by P(peacekeeping), or H(Humanitarian)
JW	VNL	Vanilla Air	VANILLA	Japan	Merged with Peach Aviation
VU	VAG	Vietravel Airlines	VIETRAVEL AIR	Vietnam	
	VAI	Volant Aviation International		Pakistan	
	VAR	Veca Airlines	VECA	El Salvador	
	VLR	Volare 22 X	VOLAX	Mexico	
	VDR	Voldirect	VOLDIR	France	
	VVV	Valair Aviação Lda	VALAIRJET	Portugal	
VB	VIV	VivaAerobus	VIVA	Mexico	
	VIL	V I Airlink	TURTLE DOVE	British Virgin Islands	
VA	VOZ	Virgin Australia	VELOCITY	Australia	Previously Used: KANGA, AURORA, VEE-OZ
	VBA	V Bird Airlines Netherlands	VEEBEE	Netherlands	
	WIW	V-avia Airline	VEE-AVIA	Ukraine	
	VBD	V-Berd-Avia	VEEBIRD-AVIA	Armenia	
	VAC	Vacationair	VACATIONAIR	Canada	
	RDW	Valair AG (Helicoptere)	ROADWATCH	Switzerland	
	VLA	Valan International Cargo Charter	NALAU	South Africa	
	VLN	Valan Limited	VALAN	Moldova	
	EHR	Valfell-Verkflug	ROTOR	Iceland	
VF	VLU	Valuair	VALUAIR	Singapore	Merged with Jetstar Asia 2014
VF		AnadoluJet	AJet	Turkiye	
J7	VJA	ValuJet Airlines	CRITTER	United States	Now operating as AirTran Airways. J7 Reassigned.
	VJA	Vista America	ICONIC	United States	Using the ICAO code that was previously assigned to ValuJet Airlines.
	VAA	Van Air Europe	EUROVAN	Czech Republic	
	VGC	Vanguardia en Aviación en Colima	VANGUARDIA COLIMA	Mexico	
	VGD	Vanguard Airlines	VANGUARD AIR	United States	
	VRH	Varesh Airlines	SKY VICTOR	Iran	
0V	VFC	Vietnam Air Services Company (VASCO)	VASCO AIR	Vietnam	
	VAG	Vega	SEGA	Kazakhstan	
	WGA	Vega Air Company	WEGA FRANKO	Ukraine	
	WEL	Veles, Ukrainian Aviation Company	VELES	Ukraine	
	VTX	Verataxis	VERATAXIS	Mexico	
	BTP	Veritair	NET RAIL	United Kingdom	
VC	VAL	Voyageur Airways	VOYAGEUR	Canada	
	GRV	Vernicos Aviation	NIGHT RIDER	Greece	
VN	HVN	Vietnam Airlines	VIET NAM	Vietnam	
	TMB	Volato	Tombo	United States	
	KWA	Vozdushnaya Academy	VOZAIR	Kazakhstan	
NN	MOV	VIM Airlines	MOV AIR	Russia	
	MVY	VIM-Aviaservice		Russia	
2R		Via Rail Canada		Canada	
	ENV	Victoria Aviation	ENDEAVOUR	United Kingdom	
	VCT	Viscount Air Service	VISCOUNT AIR	United States	
	SSI	Vision Airlines	SUPER JET	Nigeria	
	FXF	VIP Air Charter	FOX FLIGHT	United States	
	PAV	VIP Avia	NICOL	Kazakhstan	
	PRX	VIP Avia	PAREX	Latvia	
	VAT	Visionair	VISIONAIR	Ireland	
VA		Viasa		Venezuela	IATA Code transferred to Virgin Australia
	VCA	VICA - Viacao Charter Aéreos	VICA	Brazil	
	VCM	Volare Air Charter Company	CARMEN	United States	
Y4	VOI	Volaris	VOLARIS	Mexico	
VI	VDA	Volga-Dnepr Airlines	VOLGA	Russia	
	VEA	Vega Airlines	VEGA AIRLINES	Bulgaria	
	VEC	Venescar Internacional	VECAR	Venezuela	
	VEE	Victor Echo	VICTOR ECHO	Spain	
	VEI	Virgin Express Ireland	GREEN ISLE	Ireland	defunct
VX	VRD	Virgin America	REDWOOD	United States	Merged with Alaska Airlines
VJ	VJC	Vietjet Air	VIETJET	Vietnam	
V4	VES	Vieques Air Link	VIEQUES	United States	
TV	VEX	Virgin Express	VIRGIN EXPRESS	Belgium	defunct
	VFT	VZ Flights	ZETA FLIGHTS	Mexico	
VK	VGN	Virgin Nigeria Airways	VIRGIN NIGERIA	Nigeria	
	VGV	Vologda State Air Enterprise	VOLOGDA AIR	Russia	
	VHA	VH-Air Industrie	AIR V-H	Angola	
	VHM	VHM Schul-und-Charterflug	EARLY BIRD	Germany	
	VIB	Vibroair Flugservice	VITUS	Germany	
	VIC	VIP Servicios Aéreos Ejecutivos	VIP-EJECUTIVO	Mexico	
	VIE	VIP Empresarial	VIP EMPRESARIAL	Mexico	
	VIF	VIF Luftahrt	VIENNA FLIGHT	Austria	
	VIG	Vega Aviation	VEGA AVIATION	Sudan	
	VIH	Vichi	VICHI	Moldova	
	VIK	Viking Airlines	SWEDJET	Sweden	
	VIN	Vinair Aeroserviços	VINAIR	Portugal	
VS	VIR	Virgin Atlantic	VIRGIN	United Kingdom	
	VJM	Viajes Ejecutivos Mexicanos	VIAJES MEXICANOS	Mexico	
	VJT	Vistajet	VISTA	Canada	
	VJT	VistaJet	VISTA MALTA	Malta	2014
ZG	VVM	Viva Macau	JACKPOT	Macao	defunct
VE	VLE	C.A.I. Second	VOLA	Italy	
VY	VLG	Vueling Airlines	VUELING	Spain	
XF	VLK	Vladivostok Air	VLADAIR	Russia	Merged with Aurora
LC	VLO	Varig Logística	VELOG	Brazil	defunct
	VLT	Vertical-T Air Company	VERTICAL	Russia	
	VMA	Vero Monmouth Airlines	VERO MONMOUTH	United States	
	VNK	Vipport Joint Stock Company		Russia	
VM	VOA	Viaggio Air	VIAGGIO	Bulgaria	
	VOG	Voyager Airlines	VOYAGER AIR	Bangladesh	
VP	VQI	Villa Air	VILLA AIR	Maldives	
9V	VPA	Vipair Airlines	VIAIR	Kazakhstan	defunct
	VPB	Veteran Air	VETERAN	Ukraine	
	VPV	VIP-Avia	VIP AVIA	Georgia	
	VRA	Vertair	VERITAIR	United Kingdom	
	VRE	Volare Airlines	UKRAINE VOLARE	Ukraine	
	VRL	Voar Lda	VOAR LINHAS	Angola	
RG	VRN	Varig	VARIG	Brazil	
VH	VVC	Viva Air Colombia	Viva Air Colombia	Colombia	Commenced operations on May 25, 2012
	VSB	Vickers Limited	VICKERS	United Kingdom	
	VSN	Vision Airways Corporation	VISION	Canada	
	VSO	Voronezh Aircraft Manufacturing Society	VASO	Russia	
VP	VSP	VASP	VASP	Brazil	defunct
	VSS	Virgin Islands Seaplane Shuttle	WATERBIRD	United States	
	VTC	Vuelos Especializados Tollocan	VUELOS TOLLOCAN	Mexico	
	VTH	Vuelos Corporativos de Tehuacan	VUELOS TEHUACAN	Mexico	
V7	VOE	Volotea	VOLOTEA	Spain	
	VTK	Vostok Airlines	VOSTOK	Russia	
	VTL	Victor Tagle Larrain	VITALA	Chile	
	VTV	Vointeh	VOINTEH	Bulgaria	
	VUR	VIP Ecuador	VIPEC	Ecuador	defunct
	VUS	Vuela Bus	VUELA BUS	Mexico	
	VZL	Vzlyet	VZLYET	Russia	
VG	VLM	VLM Airlines	RUBENS	Belgium	defunct
	WCY	Viking Express	TITAN AIR	United States	
	WEV	Victoria International Airways	VICTORIA UGANDA	Uganda	
G6	WLG	Air Volga	GOUMRAK	Russia	
	VNR	Viennair	VIENNAIR	Austria	defunct
UK	VTI	Vistara	Vistara	India	Commenced operations 9 January 2015
WD	WDL	WDL Aviation	WDL	Germany	
	WRR	WRA Inc	WRAP AIR	United States	
	XWS	WSI Corporation		United States	
	CGG	Walmart Aviation	CHARGE	United States	
	WAS	Walsten Air Services	WALSTEN	Canada	
	GOT	WaltAir	GOTHIC	Sweden	
	WPT	Wapiti Aviation	WAPITI	Canada	
	WAV	Warbelow's Air Ventures	WARBELOW	United States	
	ATX	Warwickshire Aerocentre Ltd.	AIRTAX	United Kingdom	
WT	WSG	Wasaya Airways	WASAYA	Canada	
		Wayraperú	WAYRAPERÚ	Peru	
	WTC	Weasua Air Transport Company	WATCO	Liberia	
WH	WEB	WebJet Linhas Aéreas	WEB-BRASIL	Brazil	
	TDB	Welch Aviation	THUNDER BAY	United States	
2W	WLC	Welcome Air	WELCOMEAIR	Austria	
	BLW	Wermlandsflyg AB	BLUESTAR	Sweden	
	WCB	West Africa Airlines	KILO YANKEE	Ghana	
	WTF	West African Air Transport	WESTAF AIRTRANS	Senegal	
WZ	WSF	West African Airlines		Benin	
	WAC	West African Cargo Airlines	WESTAF CARGO	Mauritania	
PN	CHB	West Air (China)	WEST CHINA	China	
	WLX	West Air Luxembourg	WEST LUX	Luxembourg	
T2	SWN	West Atlantic Sweden	AIR SWEDEN	Sweden	
YH	WCW	West Caribbean Airways	WEST	Colombia	
	WCR	West Caribbean Costa Rica	WEST CARIBBEAN	Costa Rica	
8O	YWZ	West Coast Air	COAST AIR	Canada	
		West Coast Airlines		United States	
	WCG	West Coast Airlines	WHISKY INDIA	Ghana	
	WCA	West Coast Airways	WEST-LEONE	Sierra Leone	
	WCC	West Coast Charters	WEST COAST	United States	
	TEE	West Freugh DTEO	TEEBIRD	United Kingdom	
	WEW	West Wind Aviation	WESTWIND	Canada	
WS	WJA	WestJet	WESTJET	Canada	
	WAA	Westair Aviation	WESTAIR WINGS	Namibia	
	WSC	Westair Cargo Airlines	WESTCAR	Côte d'Ivoire	
	PCM	Westair Industries	PAC VALLEY	United States	
	BLK	Westcoast Energy	BLUE FLAME	Canada	
ST*	STT	Western Aircraft, Inc	SAWTOOTH	United States	
	WST	Western Air	WESTERN BAHAMAS	Bahamas	
	NPC	Western Air Couriers	NORPAC	United States	
	WAE	Western Air Express	WESTERN EXPRESS	United States	
WA	WAL	Western Airlines	WESTERN	United States	defunct
	WAL	Western Arctic Air	WESTERN ARCTIC	Canada	
	WTV	Western Aviators	WESTAVIA	United States	
	AAE	Western Express Air	ARIZONA	United States	defunct in 2007
	WES	Western Express Air Lines	WEST EX	Canada	
	WGN	Western Global Airlines	WESTERN GLOBAL	United States	Allocated in 2014
W7	KMR	Western Pacific Airlines	KOMSTAR	United States	
	WPA	Western Pacific Airservice	WESTPAC	Solomon Islands	
	WSL	Westflight Aviation	WEST LINE	United Kingdom	
	WSA	Westgates Airlines	WESTATES	United States	
	WHE	Westland Helicopters	WESTLAND	United Kingdom	
	WTP	Westpoint Air	WESTPOINT	Canada	
CN	WWD	Westward Airways	WESTWARD	United States	
	WHT	White	WHITEJET	Portugal	
	WEA	White Eagle Aviation	WHITE EAGLE	Poland	
	WRA	White River Air Services		Canada	
	WWL	Whyalla Airlines		Australia	
WF	WIF	Widerøe	WIDEROE	Norway	
WC	WAA	Wien Air Alaska	WIEN	United States	Wien Consolidated Airlines from 1968-1973
	WIG	Wiggins Airways	WIGGINS AIRWAYS	United States	
	WHS	Wiking Helikopter Service	WEEKING	Germany	
	WFO	Wilbur's Flight Operations	WILBURS	United States	
	WGP	Williams Grand Prix Engineering	GRAND PRIX	United Kingdom	
	WDA	Wimbi Dira Airways	WIMBI DIRA	Democratic Republic of Congo	
	WNA	Winair	WINAIR	United States	
IV	JET	Wind Jet	GHIBLI	Italy	
	WSI	Wind Spirit Air	WIND SPIRIT	United States	
7W	QGA	Windrose Air	QUADRIGA	Germany	
	WIA	Winair	WINDWARD	Netherlands	
IW	WON	Wings Air	WINGS ABADI	Indonesia	Subsidiary of Lion Air
	WAT	Wings Air Transport		Sudan	
	WAW	Wings Airways	WING SHUTTLE	United States	
	WOL	Wings Aviation	WINGJET	Guyana	
	WEX	Wings Express	WINGS EXPRESS	United States	
	WLB	Wings of Lebanon Aviation	WING LEBANON	Lebanon	
	WIN	Winlink	WINLINK	Saint Lucia	
	WAG	Wisconsin Air National Guard		United States	
	WSM	Wisman Aviation	WISMAN	United States	
8Z	WVL	Wizz Air Bulgaria	WIZZBUL	Bulgaria	defunct in 2011
W6	WZZ	Wizz Air	WIZZAIR	Hungary	
W4	WMT	Wizz Air Malta	WIZZ AIR MALTA	Malta	
W9	WUK	Wizz Air UK	WIZZ GO	United Kingdom	
	WNR	Wondair on Demand Aviation	WONDAIR	Spain	
	CWY	Woodgate Aviation	CAUSEWAY	United Kingdom	
WO	WOA	World Airways	WORLD	United States	
	XWW	World Weatherwatch		Canada	
	WWM	World Wing Aviation	MANAS WING	Kyrgyzstan	
1P		Worldspan		United States	
UI	CSW	SW Italia	SILKITALIA	Italy	
	WWS	Worldwide Aviation Services		Pakistan	
	WWI	Worldwide Jet Charter	WORLDWIDE	United States	
WW	WOW	WOW air	WOW air	Iceland	
	WRT	Wright Airlines	WRIGHT-AIR	United States	defunct
8V	WRF	Wright Air Service	WRIGHT FLYER	United States	
	CWU	Wuhan Airlines	WUHAN AIR	China	
	WYC	Wycombe Air Centre	WYCOMBE	United Kingdom	
	WYG	Wyoming Airlines	WYOMING	United States	
KW	WAN	Wataniya Airways	WATANIYA	Kuwait	
3W*	VNR	Wan Air	WANAIR	French Polynesia	defunct
WR	WEN	WestJet Encore	ENCORE	Canada	
WJ	JES	JetSmart Argentina	SMARTBIRD	Argentina	
	XJE	X-Jet		Austria	
	XAB	Xabre Aerolineas	AERO XABRE	Mexico	
	XAE	Xair	AURA	Czech Republic	
	XJC	XJC Limited	EXCLUSIVE JET	United Kingdom	
	XER	Xerox Corporation	XEROX	United States	
7A	XRC	Express Air Cargo	TUNISIA CARGO	Tunisia	
MF	CXA	Xiamen Airlines	XIAMEN AIR	China	
	CXJ	Xinjiang Airlines	XINJIANG	China	
	XJT	Xjet Limited	XRAY	United Kingdom	
SE	SEU	XL Airways France	STARWAY	France	
	GXL	XL Airways Germany	STARDUST	Germany	
	XOJ	XOJet	EXOJET	United States	
	XPS	XP International	XP PARCEL	Netherlands	
		Xpedite	BIGSPLASH	United Kingdom	
XN	XAR	XpressAir	XPRESS	Indonesia	Renamed from Travel Express Aviation Services in 2012
	RAG	Xstrata Nickel (Raglan Mine)	RAGLAN	Canada	
	DGA	Yellow River Delta General Aviation	YELLOW RIVER	China	
	YRG	Yak Air	YAKAIR GEORGIA	Georgia	
	AKY	Yak-Service	YAK-SERVICE	Russia	
	YAK	Yakolev	YAK AVIA	Russia	Yak Design Bureau
YL	LLM	Yamal Airlines	YAMAL	Russia	
R3	SYL	Yakutia Airlines	AIR YAKUTIA	Russia	
	CYG	Yana Airlines	VICAIR	Cambodia	
	AYG	Yangon Airways	AIR YANGON	Burma	
Y8	YZR	Suparna Airlines	YANGTZE RIVER	China	Former name: Yangtze River Express
	LYH	Yankee Lima Helicopteres	HELIGUYANE	France	
	MHD	Yas Air Kish	YAS AIR	Iran	
Y0	EMJ	Yellow Air Taxi/Friendship Airways		United States	
	ELW	Yellow Wings Air Services	YELLOW WINGS	Kenya	
IY	IYE	Yemenia	YEMENI	Yemen	
	ERV	Yerevan-Avia	YEREVAN-AVIA	Armenia	
YT	NYT	Yeti Airlines	YETI AIRLINES	Nepal	Domestic
	YFS	Young Flying Service	YOUNG AIR	United States	
	AYU	Yuhi Air Lines		Japan	
	AYE	Yunnan Yingan Airlines	AIR YING AN	China	
4Y	TUD	Yute Air Alaska	TUNDRA	United States	defunct 2017
	UGN	Yuzhnaya Aircompany	PLUTON	Kazakhstan	
2N	UMK	Yuzhmashavia	YUZMASH	Ukraine	
	BZE	Zenith Aviation	ZENSTAR	United Kingdom	2014
	AZB	Zaab Air	ZAAB AIR	Ghana	
	AZJ	Zas Air		Egypt	
	AZR	Zenith Air	ZENAIR	South Africa	
	CDC	Zhejiang Loong Airlines	HUALONG	China	
	CIT	Zanesville Aviation	ZANE	United States	
FS	AYN	FlyArystan	Arystan	Kazakhstan	
	EMR	Zenmour Airlines	ZENMOUR	Mauritania	
	EZD	Zest Airways	ZEST AIRWAYS	Philippines	
	GZQ	Zagros Air	ZAGROS	Iraq	
C4	IMX	Zimex Aviation	ZIMEX	Switzerland	
	IZG	Zagros Airlines	ZAGROS	Iran	
	JTU	Zhetysu	ZHETYSU	Kazakhstan	
	KVZ	Z-Aero Airlines		Ukraine	
	KZH	Zhez Air		Kazakhstan	
	MBG	Zephyr Aviation	CHALGROVE	United Kingdom	
	MLU	Zracno Pristaniste Mali Losinj	MALI LOSINJ	Croatia	
	MZE	Zenith Aviation (Malta)		Malta	
	ORZ	Zorex	ZOREX	Spain	
	PZY	Zapolyarye Airline Company	ZAPOLYARYE	Russia	
	RZR	Zephyr Express	RECOVERY	United States	
	RZU	Zhersu Avia	ZHERSU AVIA	Kazakhstan	
	SYZ	Zil Air	ZIL AIR	Seychelles	
	TAN	Zanair	ZANAIR	Tanzania	
	ZAI	Zaire Aero Service	ZASAIR	Democratic Republic of Congo	
	ZAK	Zambia Skyways	ZAMBIA SKIES	Zambia	
	ZAR	Zairean Airlines	ZAIREAN	Democratic Republic of the Congo	
	ZAV	Zetavia	ZETAVIA	Ukraine	
	ZAW	Zoom Airways	ZED AIR	Bangladesh	
	ZMA	Zambezi Airlines	ZAMBEZI WINGS	Zambia	
	RZV	Z-Avia	ZEDAVIA	Armenia	ICAO Code and callsign no longer allocated
Q3	MBN	Zambian Airways	ZAMBIANA	Zambia	
	ZAN	Zantop International Airlines	ZANTOP	United States	ICAO Code and callsign no longer allocated
	ZAS	ZAS Airlines of Egypt	ZAS AIRLINES	Egypt	ICAO Code and callsign no longer allocated
	CJG	Zhejiang Airlines	ZHEJIANG	China	ICAO Code and callsign no longer allocated
	CFZ	Zhongfei General Aviation	ZHONGFEI	China	
	CYN	Zhongyuan Aviation	ZHONGYUAN	China	ICAO Code and callsign no longer allocated
3J	WZP	Zip	ZIPPER	Canada	ICAO Code and callsign no longer allocated
ZG	TZP	Zipair Tokyo	ZIPPY	Japan	Subsidiary of Japan Airlines
Z4	OOM	Zoom Airlines	ZOOM	Canada	defunct, ICAO Code and callsign no longer allocated
	ORZ	Zorex	ZOREX	Spain	

^{*} on IATA code indicates a controlled duplicate.
italics indicates a defunct airline.

== IATA Traffic Conference Areas ==
The International Air Transport Association (IATA) divides the world into three areas called the Traffic Conference Areas (TCAs) for air travel purposes. These areas are used to define geographical boundaries for fare construction and other industry-related practices:

- Traffic Conference Area 1 (TC1) – this area includes the Americas, encompassing North America (the Caribbean, Central America, and Northern America) and South America.
- Traffic Conference Area 2 (TC2) – this area includes the EMEA region, encompassing Europe, the Middle East, and Africa (North Africa and Sub-Saharan Africa).
- Traffic Conference Area 3 (TC3) – this area includes the Asia–Pacific region, encompassing the rest of Asia (Central Asia, East Asia, North Asia, South Asia, and Southeast Asia) and Oceania.

Essentially, TC1 covers the "New World", while TC2 and TC3 together cover the "Old World" (Africa-Eurasia) and the "Land Down Under".

== See also ==
- IATA airport code
- ICAO airport code
