= List of defunct airlines of Greece =

This is a list of defunct airlines of Greece.

Airline	Image	IATA	ICAO	Callsign	Commenced operations	Ceased operations	Notes
Aegean Aviation		A3	AEE	AEGEAN	1988	1999	Renamed to Aegean Airlines
Aerogenesis Air Services					1999	2022	
Aeolian Airlines			AOL	AEOLIAN	2011	2012	
Aeroland Airways		3S	AEN	AEROLAND	2005	2012	
Aerospace One		IW	OAN	HELLAS CARGO	2013	2014	
Afrek					1976	1983	Operated Bristol Britannia
Agapitos Airlines					1997	1998	Renamed to Kara Air
Air go		4A	AGS	AIRGO CARGO	2008	2011	Operated British Aerospace ATP
Air Greece		JG	AGJ	AIR GREECE	1994	1999	Merged into Aegean Airlines
Air Manos					1999	2000	
Air Miles					2002	2004	
Air Transport of Greece					1947	1951	Merged with Hellenic Airlines and Technical and Aeronautical Holdings to form TAE Greek National Airlines
AirSea Lines			PEV		2004	2009	
Alexandair			AXN	ALEXANDROS	2004	2007	
Apollo Airways		PJ; K6	AOA	APOLLO AIR	1994	1997	Operated Airbus A300
ArGo Airways			AGW	ARGONAUT	2009	2010	Operated DHC-6 Twin Otter
Astra Airlines		A2	AZI	GREEK STAR	2008	2019	
Athens Airways		ZF	ATW	ATHENSAIR	2008	2011	
Axon Airlines		XN	AXO	AXONAIR	1998	2001	Established as Cosmos Airlines. Operated Airbus A300, Boeing 737-400, Boeing 737-700, Embraer ERJ 145
CAL Aviation			CLV	CALAVIA	?	?	
Cosmos Airlines					1998	1998	Renamed to Axon Airlines. Operated Boeing 737NG, Boeing 717-200
Cretan Airlines		C5	KRT	CRETAN	1993	1995	
Cronus Airlines		X5	CUS	CRONUS	1995	2001	Merged into Aegean Airlines
Daedalus Airlines					1947	1950	Went bankrupt
Delphic Airlines					2021	2023	Never got AOC - went bankrupt
Electra Airlines			ELD	ELECTRA	2000	2003	
Ellinair		EL	ELB	ELLINAIR HELLAS	2013	2021	
Elite Airlines					2007	2010	
EuroAir		6M	EUP	EUROSTAR	1995	2009	AOC suspended
First Airways					2010	2012	Rebranded as Minoan Air
Fly Ellas			ELF		2018	2019	Renamed to FlyGR8
Fly Hellas		VQ	VKH	DELPHI	2011	2011	
Galaxy Airways		9G	GLX		1999	2001	
Gee Bee Air			GEB	GOLF-BRAVO AIR	2002	2006	
Greece Airways		IX	GRE	GREECE AIRWAYS	2003	2006	Formed by Greek, Spanish and UK (Air Scotland) interests using assets from Electra Airlines, dba Air-Scotland.
GreenJet Airlines			GRN;GRJ		2011	2013	
Hellas Air Service			HRS	HELLAS AIR	?	?	
Hellas Jet		HJ	HEJ	HELLAS JET	2003	2010	
Hellas Wings			LJR	HELLAS WINGS	1998	2006	
Hellenic Airlines (GAT)				HELLENIC	1947	1951	Merged with Air Transport of Greece and Technical and Aeronautical Holdings to form TAE Greek National Airlines
Hellenic Imperial Airways		HT	IMP	IMPERIAL	2007	2012	
Hellenic Star Airways		HJ	HST		1999	2003	
Helliniki Etairia Enaerion Sygkoinonion					1931	1940	Known under the French name of Société Hellénique des Communications Aériennes
Hermes Airlines		H3	HRM	HERMES	2011	2016	
Icarus Airlines					1930	1930	Known as Greece's first airline. Went bankrupt
InterJet			INJ	INJET	1992	2011	
Jonian Airways					1971	1972	
K2 SmartJets			KSJ		2007	2013	
KAL Aviation			CLV	CALAVIA	1990	2001	Became Ver-Avia. Operated Swearingen Merlin IV
Lumiwings	Boeing 737-300 der Lumiwings	L9	LWI	LUMI	2018	2025	
Macedonian Airlines		MC	MCS	MACAIR	1992	2003	Rebranded as Olympic Airlines
Meelad Air Greece			MEL		2008	2014	Established in Jordan, but applied in May 2009 to the Hellenic Civil Aviation Authority for an AOC
Minoan Air			MAV	MINOAN	2012	2015	
Olympic Airlines		OA	OAL	OLYMPIC	2003	2009	Sold name and logo to Olympic Air
Olympic Airways		OA	OAL	OLYMPIC	1956	2003	Merged with several internal companies within Olympic Airways to form Olympic Airways Services
Olympic Aviation		ML	OLY	OLAVIA	1971	2003	Flight academy became part of Olympic Airways Services and airliner fleet transferred to Olympic Airlines. Still operates as a helicopter charter service
Olympus Airways			OLY	OLYAIR	2014	2024	
Orange2Fly		O4	OTF	ORANGE2FLY	2015	2021	
Pantheon Airways		OA	OAL		2008	2008	Rebranded as Olympic Air
Princess Airlines		IG	PER		1998	2000	Operated Boeing 737-200, Boeing 737-300
South East European Airlines		6J	GRE	SEEA AIR	1992	1995	Flew under Virgin Atlantic brand. Operated Airbus A320, Boeing 737-400, Fokker 50, Swearingen Merlin IV
Sky Wings Airlines		ND	GSW	ARROW JET	2006	2012	
SkyGreece Airlines		GW	SGR	SKYGREECE	2012	2015	
Summer Express			EUH		1997	1998	
TAE Greek National Airlines		GK	TAE	GREEK	1946	1957	Rebranded as Olympic Airways
TEA Trans European Airlines			TEG	EUROLINES	1998	1998	Operated Embraer Bandeirante
Technical and Aeronautical Holdings		GK	TAE	GREEK	1935	1951	Merged with Hellenic Airlines and Air Transport of Greece to form TAE Greek National Airlines
Venus Airlines		V4	VER	VENUS	1992	1996	Operated Boeing 727-200, Boeing 767-200, MD-83, MD-87
Ver-Avia			GRV	NIGHT RIDER	2001	2009	Operated Swearingen SA227-AC Metro III
Viking Hellas Aviation		VQ	VKH		2009	2011	Rebranded as Fly Hellas

== See also ==
- List of airlines of Greece
- List of airports in Greece
