= Viking Airlines =

Swedish charter airline

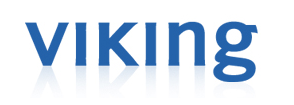
IATA	ICAO	Call sign
4P	VIK	SWEDJET
- Founded: 2003
- Commenced operations: 5 May 2003
- Ceased operations: 18 October 2010
- Operating bases: Athens International Airport; Glasgow International Airport; Heraklion International Airport; London Gatwick Airport; Manchester Airport; Stockholm Arlanda Airport; Bristol Airport
- Subsidiaries: None
- Fleet size: 3
- Destinations: 30 (at time of closure)
- Headquarters: Spånga, Stockholm, Sweden
- Website: Viking Airlines

Viking Airlines AB was a privately owned charter airline with a head office in Stockholm, Sweden and based in Stockholm. Viking Airlines primarily operated charter flights for European tour operators. The airline was established in 2003. Viking Airlines had its head office in Spånga, Stockholm, Sweden.

Viking Airlines ceased operations on 18 October 2010 was granted protection from creditors and placed in the hands of an administrator on 2 December 2010. The company was formally declared bankrupt in February 2011.

== History ==
Viking Airlines logo used from 2003 to 2009

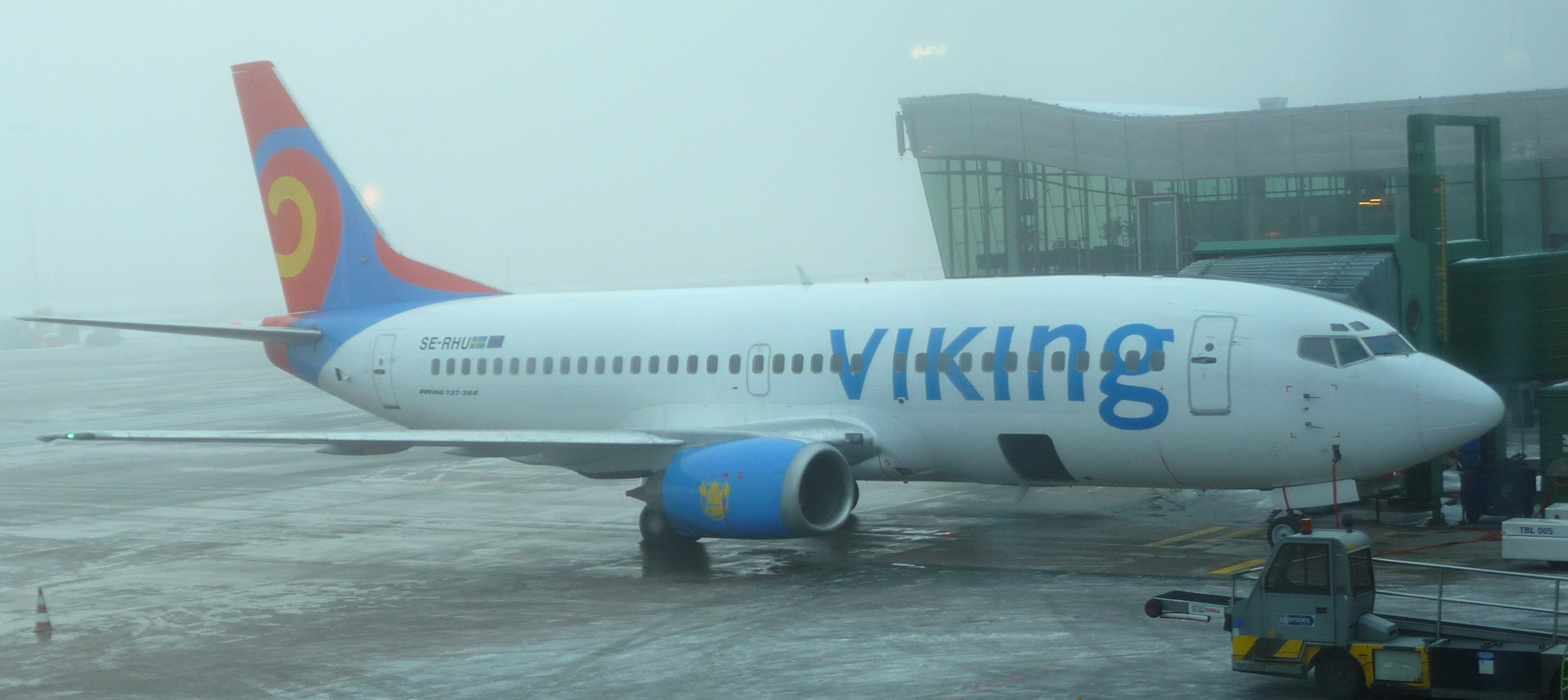
A Viking Airlines Boeing 737-300 in new livery, at Göteborg Landvetter Airport, Sweden (2009)

Viking Airlines started operations on 5 May 2003, with two McDonnell Douglas MD-83 which were used for charter operations throughout Europe. In 2004 another MD-83 was added to the fleet and by 2006 it was operating four MD-83s. Three aircraft were sold in 2008 leaving a single McDonnell Douglas MD-83 aircraft being operated in 2008, which was supplemented with aircraft from Sky Wings to meet seasonal demand.

In December 2008 Viking Airlines took delivery of one Boeing 737-800, which entered service from a new base at London Gatwick Airport, UK on 19 December 2008. Viking Airlines also took delivery of five more Boeing 737-800s and three Boeing 737-300s in April 2009. Some aircraft were leased from Sunwing Airlines. Viking also opened bases at Manchester and Bristol Airport where it launched new flights to holiday destinations in Greece, Bulgaria, Egypt, the Canary Islands, France and Italy. Another base was also opened in Glasgow later in the year, with new flights to the Mediterranean.

From December 2008 through to October 2010 Viking Airlines operated regular flights to Iraq, serving Erbil, Baghdad and Sulaymaniyah from London Gatwick Airport connecting in Sweden before continuing on to their destination in Iraq. Gatwick based Cabin Crew would operate these flights. The services into Iraq were operated via Sweden in conjunction with sanctions at the time preventing aircraft from the United Kingdom from flying into the war torn country, for a short time during that period flights were stopped due to a report of a Swedish aircraft being shot at during takeoff from Sulaymaniyah International Airport, however restrictions were lifted and flights resumed, life insurance policies were granted to the Cabin Crew and Flight Crew operating these flights due to the high risk zone in which the aircraft was flying into, they were also only able to operate services into the country during the night and had to ensure that all aircraft lights were switched off inside and out to make the aircraft less visible during the approach.

On 16 July 2010, Goldtrail, the UK's leading tour operator for packaged holidays to Turkey and Greece collapsed leaving an estimated 16,000 customers stranded overseas. Viking Airlines was one of the three charter airlines that operated flights for Goldtrail.

On 17 August 2010, the airline stated that, as a consequence of Flight Options' going into administration, it was to cut three aircraft "immediately" from its fleet. On 15 October 2010, Viking suspended operations for the winter season, returning all remaining aircraft to their lessors. On 17 August 2010, Kiss Flights went into liquidation. Viking cut their fleet back to six aircraft because Viking was also an airline that operated for Kiss. Viking's fleet was further reduced to two during September/October 2010.

On 15 October 2010, Viking confirmed that the remaining aircraft had been handed back to the lessors. On the 19 October 2010, all operational staff employed by Viking Airlines AB in the United Kingdom by the wholly owned subsidiary Viking VIP Limited received a letter of Termination of Contract from the Director of Flight Operations, Bo-Göran Svensson. This "released all staff from employment" with immediate effect and without compensation or remuneration. However, the airline has filed for bankruptcy protection, intending to recommence services on 31 March 2011, Viking was formally declared bankrupt in February 2011 with the loss of its remaining 11 staff at its Spånga base.

In February 2011, the company's domain name was taken over by former Greek sister company Viking Hellas (Flyviking.com Limited), with flights between Gatwick, England and Greece, Turkey and Egypt using Airbus A320. Flyviking and Viking Airlines share the same United Kingdom address in Gatwick, Sussex. Viking Hellas planned to rename itself Fly Hellas on 1 May, so it can distance itself from its former sister company Viking Airlines, and at the same time withdraw from its Gatwick base.

== Fleet ==
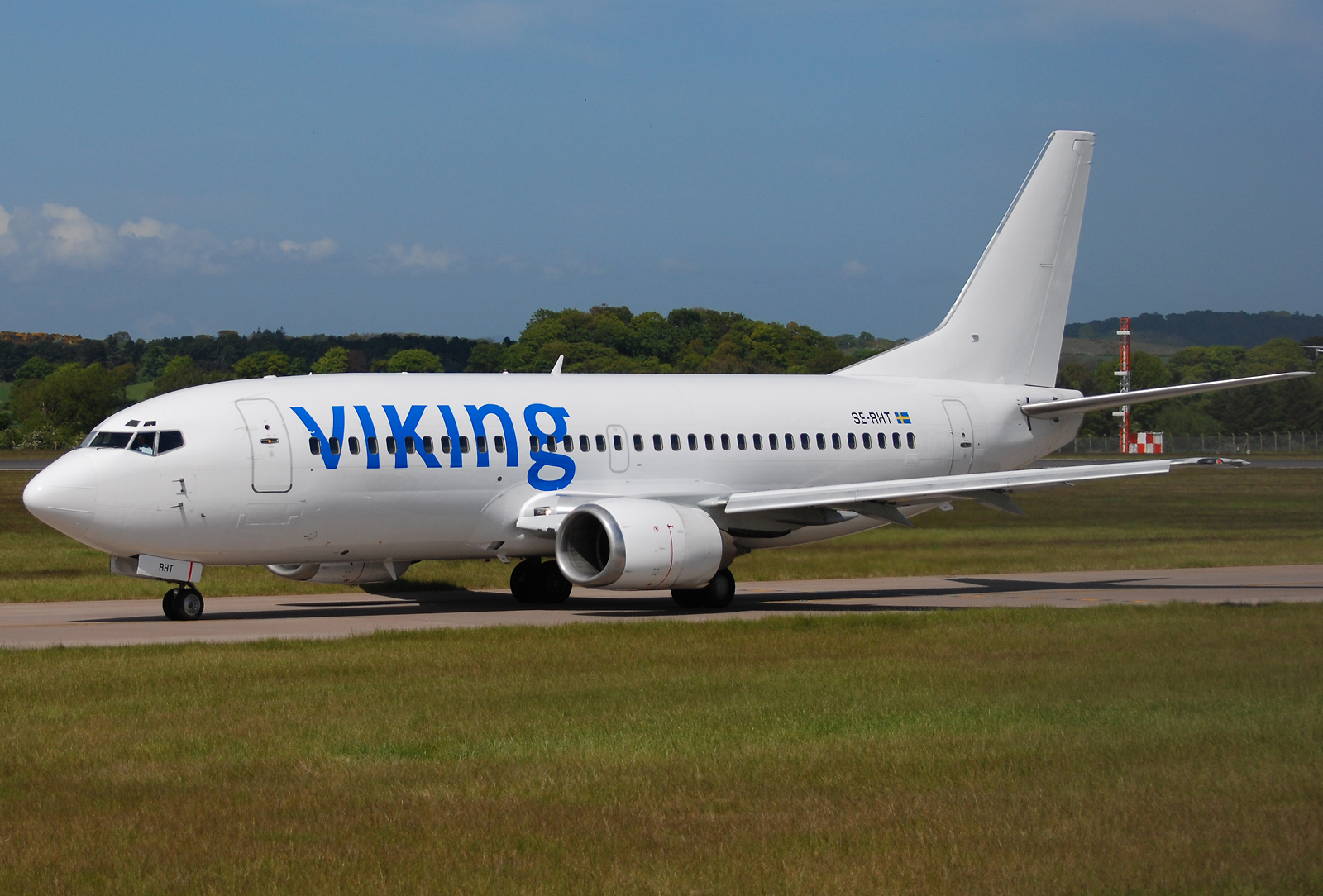
A Viking Airlines Boeing 737-300 at Edinburgh Airport, Scotland (2009)

The Viking Airlines fleet included the following aircraft in an all-economy configuration:

All Viking Airlines AB fleet has now been returned to the lessors.

Viking Airlines used to operate the following aircraft:

Viking Airlines fleet
Aircraft	Total	Time of operation	Notes
Boeing 737-300	3	2009–2010	
Boeing 737-800	6	2008–2010	3 leased from Sunwing Airlines
McDonnell Douglas MD-83	5	2003–2009	

=== Number of passengers by year ===
- 2003: 160,000
- 2004: 200,000
- 2005: 290,000
- 2006: 350,000
- 2007: 340 000
