= Volos Army Airport =

Volos/Nea Ionia Airport
- IATA: none; ICAO: LGVO

Summary
- Airport type: Defunct/Demolished
- Operator: Hellenic Civil Aviation Authority
- Location: Volos
- Elevation AMSL: 38 m / 125 ft
- Coordinates: 39°23′0.06″N 22°55′02.84″E
- Interactive map of Volos/Nea Ionia Airport

Runways
Direction	Length		Surface
Direction	m	ft	Surface
14/32	1,200	3,947	Asphalt
- (There is nothing left of the airport)

Volos/Nea Ionia Airport (Greek: Κρατικός Αερολιμένας Βόλου/Νέας Ιωνίας) (ICAO: LGVO) was a joint public and military airport, situated at Nea Ionia, Volos. It was established in 1948 with a runway of 970m./3,190 ft. In 1954 the runway length was reduced to 650m./2,138 ft. and at that time the airport was exclusively used by the Hellenic Army. The airport finally closed in 1981, its infrastructure abandoned and left to decay. The runway was located where the new Volos Ring Road is situated today.

The airport was replaced by Nea Anchialos National Airport, which began operations in 1991 and sought to cover the needs of the area of Central Greece, filling in the gap of the old defunct Volos Airport.

== Former Airlines and destinations ==
- TAE Greek National Airlines (Athens)
