= Kiss Flights =

Tour operator in London, England, closed 2010

- Company type: Private
- Industry: Tour operator
- Defunct: August 17, 2010
- Headquarters: London, England
- Parent: Flight Options
- Website: Kiss Flights

Kiss Flights was a charter, seat only tour operator which ceased trading on 17 August 2010. Kiss Flights was a trading name for Flight Options Ltd, based in London, England. The company sold flights to Spain (mainland and Canary Islands), Cyprus, Egypt, Greece, Portugal and Turkey.

== History ==
Originally trading under the name of, it was sold to Flight Options Ltd in January 2009 following the collapse of XL Leisure Group. It was founded by Michael Smith and Paul Moss, who had previously worked at failed tour operator XL Airways which also went into administration in September 2008. Some of their flights were operated by the Swedish airline Viking Airlines. The company was registered with ATOL (No.4233) through its parent company, Flight Options Ltd. The parent company was set up in 1995 and has bought a number of other companies. The website was originally only for travel agents, although it later became possible for the general public to directly book online. The company was licensed to sell 168,700 seats until March 2011 using ATOL protection.

== Cessation of operations ==
On 17 August 2010 Flight Options Ltd announced that it would cease trading at 17:00 BST. This led to initial uncertainty for up to 70,000 holidaymakers, with 13,000 of those abroad. It is the third British travel company to fold during the summer of 2010. Firstly Goldtrail collapsed on 17 July 2010, then Sun4U on 13 August 2010. Due to the timing at the height of the summer season the CAA even guaranteed outbound flights for the first 24 hours after the collapse.
