= Technical and Aeronautical Holdings =

Greek airline

Technical and Aeronautical Holdings (T.A.E.)
| IATA | ICAO | Call sign |
|---|---|---|
| GK | TAE | Greek |
- Founded: 1935
- Ceased operations: 1951
- Hubs: Tatoi Airport (1935-1941); Athens Hellenikon Airport (1946-1951)
- Fleet size: 11
- Destinations: 8
- Headquarters: Athens, Greece
- Key people: Stephanos Zotos

Technical and Aeronautical Holdings (Greek: Τεχνικαί Αεροπορικαί Εκμεταλλεύσεις) (T.A.E.) was a Greek airline formed in 1935 by Stephanos Zotos. It flew domestic routes until the German invasion of Greece in April 1941 destroyed the fleet. T.A.E. resumed service after the end of World War II and flew DC-3 Dakotas until 1951 when the Greek government forced the consolidation of three extant airlines into one new nationalized airline which was called TAE Greek National Airlines.

== History ==
=== Before the war (1935-1941) ===
Prior to 1935, when Stephanos Zotos formed the Technical and Aeronautical Holdings, there was one nationally operated Greek airline, the Greek Company for Air Transportation (Greek: Ελληνική Εταιρία Εναερίων Συγκοινωνιών Α.Ε. (E.E.E.Σ.)). The new company's first aircraft were a de Havilland DH 87 Hornet Moth, registered as SX-AAI, and a de Havilland DH 82A Tiger Moth, with registration SX-AAK. Operating from a base at Tatoi Airport north of Athens.

Due to the relatively small number of passengers traveling around Greece in the 1930s, T.A.E. primarily flew routes not covered by E.E.E.Σ. and used its aircraft and pilots as a training school. With the outbreak of World War II, and the Italian invasion in October 1940, most civilian pilots were mustered into the Royal Hellenic Air Force. However, it was not until the German invasion in April 1941, that the aircraft of T.A.E. were destroyed by the Luftwaffe and the airline ceased operations for the duration of the war.

=== After the war (1946-1951) ===
As soon as Greece began re-building its infrastructure after the end of World War II, Zotos, freshly out of service in the Air Force, looked to re-establish the airline. He worked with the American airline Trans World Airlines, establishing his company's offices in his home. Through this partnership, Zotos secured for T.A.E. three ex-US Army Air Force C-47 Dakotas, which were converted into Douglas DC-3s in Egypt during the summer of 1946. These aircraft, registered as SX-BAA, SX-BAB and SX-BAC began service on July 30, 1946, from the newly established Athens Hellenikon Airport south-east of the city on the Saronic Gulf. These T.A.E. aircraft represented the first post-war civil aviation in Greece, with scheduled service to Thessaloniki and Chania. The airline's passengers waited for their flights in a large tent, until a proper terminal could be built, but the first year of operations the airline carried 11,000 passengers. The airline also operated as the sole Greek-flagged carrier in this period, and as such, it flew the Greek delegation to the Paris Peace talks on October 4, 1946.

In the summer of 1947, T.A.E. secured three additional DC-3s (2 from the United States military and one from the British Royal Air Force). The aircraft, registered as SX-BAG, SX-BAH, and SX-BAI respectively, were christened at a celebration on August 31, 1947, attended by the new king, Paul. Tragedy struck a few days later when on September 3, 1947, SX-BAB crashed near Voula while on final approach at Hellenikon Airport. The Greek Parliament determined in 1947 to charter three additional airlines: Hellenic Airlines (Ελληνικαί Αεροπορικαί Συγκοινωνίαι, ΕΛΛ.Α.Σ.), Air Transport of Greece (Αεροπορικαί Μεταφοραί Ελλάδος, AME) and Daedalus Airlines (Δαίδαλος). Despite the new competition, T.A.E. managed to carry about 66,000 passengers in 1947 and over 184,000 in 1948. However, there were limits to the numbers of domestic passengers that the still-shaky Greek market could produce, and all of the airlines were constantly in jeopardy of failing. Nevertheless, T.A.E. purchased an additional 5 DC-3s from the RAF in Tehran, registered as SX-BAD, SX-BAE, SX-BAF, SX-BAL, SX-BAK.

In 1948, T.A.E. saw another development, when on September 12, 1948, the first aircraft hijacking in Greece occurred. On a scheduled flight from Athens–Thessaloniki, with 21 passengers aboard, SX-BAH was hijacked over the island of Euboea. The three hijackers demanded to be flown to Yugoslavia. The pilots were able to land 60 kilometers south-east of the town of Skopje and, after disembarking the hijackers, the aircraft landed in Thessaloniki 4 and a half hours late.

1949 proved to be a challenging year for the fledgling airline as it suffered two air crashes. The first was on April 23, 1949, when SX-BAF crashed on landing at Hellenikon Airport. No one was injured, but the aircraft was a total loss. A month and a half later on June 6, while flying from Kavala–Athens, SX-BAI crashed on the north slope of Mount Parnitha killing all 18 passengers aboard. Due to economic recession and improved road and shipping infrastructure, the number of passengers flown by all three airlines reached a plateau at 324,000 in 1949.

In 1950, Daedalus Airlines ceased operations as the number of passengers for all Greek airlines declined precipitously. Due to the financial difficulties of all three carriers and to ensure that Greece maintained a Greek-flagged carrier, in 1951, the Greek government forced the merger of all three companies into TAE Greek National Airlines, and Zotos' airline was absorbed even as the name survived.

== Destinations ==
Technical and Aeronautical Holdings served a number of domestic destinations in Greece on an irregular basis in the period 1935-1941. After the airline was re-established in 1946, it began regular scheduled services.

=== Scheduled Service 1946-1951 ===
- Agrinion
- Athens
- Chania
- Ioannina
- Kavala
- Kerkyra
- Heraklion
- Thessaloniki

== Fleet 1946–1951 ==
Technical and Aeronautical Holdings fleet
| Aircraft | Total | Type | Notes |
|---|---|---|---|
| Douglas DC-3 | 11 | Propeller aircraft | |
