= List of airlines of Greece =

This is a list of aircraft operators which are licensed by the Hellenic Civil Aviation Authority.

== Scheduled airlines ==
Airline	Image	ICAO	IATA	Callsign	Commenced operations	Notes
Aegean Airlines		AEE	A3	AEGEAN	1987 (as Aegean Aviation); 1999 (as Aegean Airlines)	Flag carrier
Bluebird Airways		BBG	BZ	CANDIA BIRD	2008	
Olympic Air		OAL	OA	OLYMPIC	2009 (as Olympic Air); 1957 (as Olympic Airways)	
Sky Express		SEH	GQ	AIR CRETE	2005	

== Charter airlines ==
Airline	Image	ICAO	IATA	Callsign	Commenced operations
Air Mediterranean		MAR	MV	HELLASMED	2017
Amjet Executive		AMJ		AMJET EXEC	2009
GainJet Aviation		GNJ		HERCULES JET	2006
Hellenic Seaplanes					
Marathon Airlines		MTO	O8	MARATHON	2019
Panellenic Airlines		RJB		PANELLENIC	2021

== Cargo airlines ==
Airline	Image	ICAO	IATA	Callsign	Commenced operations
Aviator Airways		AVW		AVIATOR	1992
Epsilon Aviation		GRV		EPSILON	2008
Swiftair Hellas		MDF		SWIFTAIR	2005

== See also ==
- List of defunct airlines of Greece
- List of airports in Greece
- List of defunct airlines of Europe
