= AirSea Lines =

Airline based in Gouvia, Corfu, Greece

| IATA | ICAO | Call sign |
|---|---|---|
| - | - | - |
- Founded: 2004
- Ceased operations: 2009
- Hubs: Gouvia Marina
- Fleet size: 2
- Destinations: 9
- Headquarters: Corfu, Greece
- Website: http://www.airsealines.com/

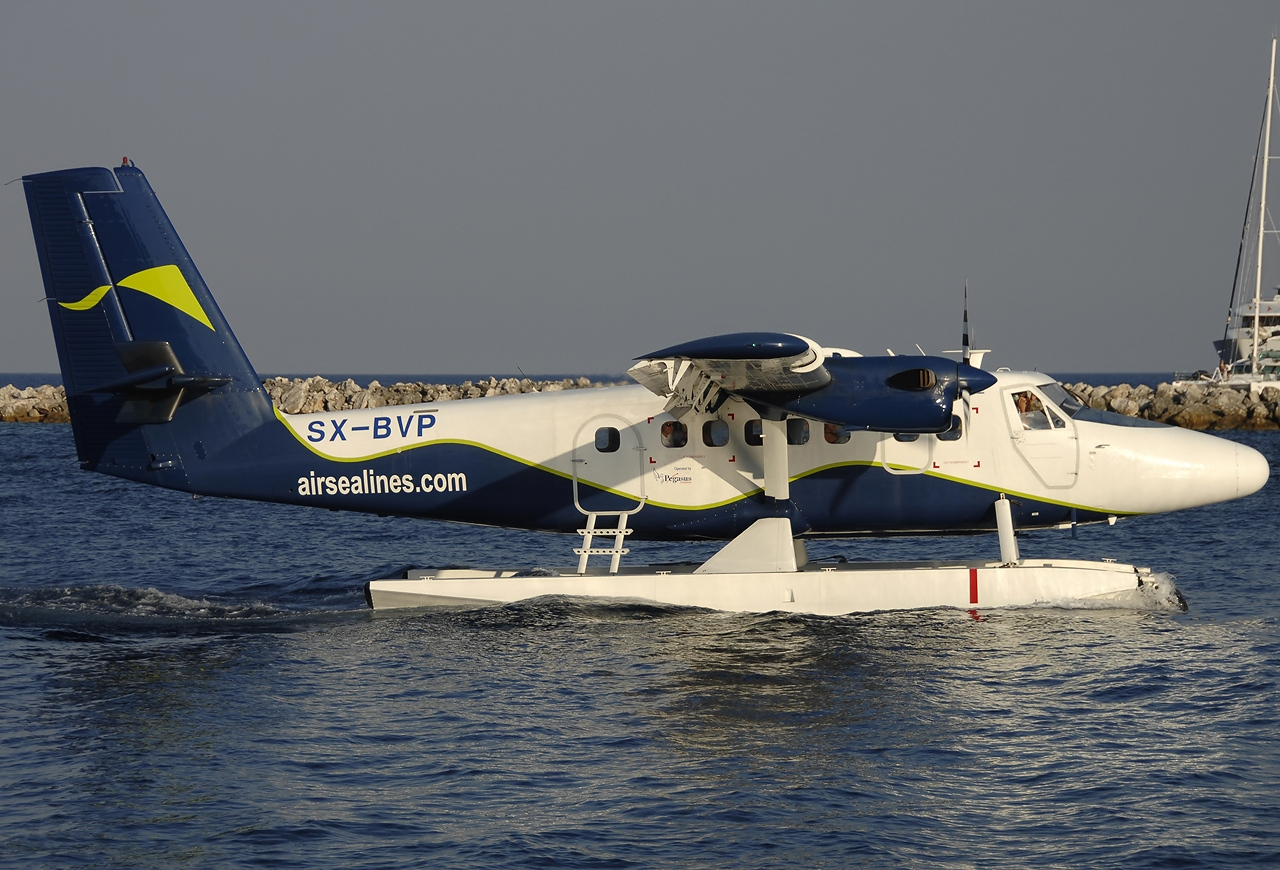
AirSea Lines DHC-6-300 Twin Otter

AirSea Lines was an airline based in Gouvia, Corfu, Greece. It was the first scheduled services seaplane operator in Greece in recent years. Its main base was Gouvia Marina The airline ceased operations in 2009, citing bureaucratic and infrastructure hurdles.

== History ==
In 2007 AirSea Lines expanded its network into the Aegean from Attica, using the port of Lavrio (instead of the preferred location of Piraeus) citing insufficient infrastructure at Piraeus for seaplane operations. The expansion to the Aegean Sea was unsuccessful which the airline attributed to infrastructural hurdles that prevented them from basing their aircraft at Piraeus. The company was forced to retreat back to its routes in the Ionian Sea.

In April 2008 it was announced that the airline will be ceasing operations altogether, citing bureaucratic hurdles. The airline affirmed that it was impaired by incoherent regulations between the Civil Aviation Authority (which regulates civil aviation) and the Merchant Marine Ministry (which regulates commercial shipping). The airline blames slow bureaucratic procedures that did not resolve this problem in time, rendering AirSea Lines a loss-making venture.

As of 2009, one of AirSea Lines' aircraft is flying for Harbour Air Malta, others are in maintenance or for sale, and the company's website is now defunct.

While it is currently unknown if AirSea Lines will be operating in the future, the airline opened the door for other seaplane carriers, notably ArGo Airways.

AirSea Lines briefly operated under the name Pegasus Aviation.

== Destinations ==
As of October 2008 AirSea Lines operated services to the following scheduled destinations:

Italy

- Brindisi

Greece

- Corfu
- Paxi
- Ioannina
- Ithacae
- Patras

From May 2010 AirSea Lines also planned to operate from Kefalonia, Greece

- Poros, Kefalonia, Greece -> Patras, Greece

== Fleet ==
As of August 2006 the AirSea fleet included:

- 1 de Havilland Canada DHC-6 Twin Otter Series 300
