= Goldtrail =

Former UK-based tour operator

Goldtrail was a UK-based tour operator that specialised in operated flights and holidays to Turkey and Greece. It was run by Abdulkadir Aydin, the sole director, based in Surrey, England.

== Controversy ==
A number of former customers had received sub-standard accommodation and treatment on holiday in Turkey. Other holidaymakers, it discovered, had become ill after taking Goldtrail holidays. The company was also fined thousands of pounds by the Association of British Travel Agents, ABTA, the programme reported. The directors were convicted of fraud in absentia, as they had already fled to Northern Cyprus.

The CAA advised customers due to fly with the failed operator to check with their travel agent before travelling to the airport. In a statement issued on its website, the aviation regulator said: "The CAA has taken steps to protect customers booked with Goldtrail Travel Limited after the company ceased trading.

In 2009, the company featured in the BBC Watchdog consumer affairs programme.

== Collapse ==
It collapsed in 2010 and went into administration. This left 23,500 tourist stranded without a way home and a further 110,000 would-be passengers holding prepaid tickets. The collapse of GoldTrail cost the Air Travel Organisers' Licensing (ATOL) over £20 million.

On 13 May 2013, Adbulkadir Aydin was disqualified for 15 years from being a director of any UK company, being found guilty of 'gross mismanagement' of the company's affairs. The high court heard Aydin transferred over £10 million to himself and family members prior to the collapse of GoldTrail.

== Notes ==
The company also traded under the names of Goldtrail Holidays, Goldtrail Travel and Sunmar.

== Airline operators ==
Goldtrail used many charter airlines for their operations. These included:

- (Turkey) Onur Air
- (Turkey) Saga Airlines
- (Turkey) Turkuaz Airlines
- (Sweden) Viking Airlines
