= Cretan Airlines =

Greek airline

IATA	ICAO	Call sign
C5	KRT	Cretan
- Founded: 1993
- Ceased operations: 1995
- Hubs: Heraklion International Airport, "Nikos Kazantzakis"
- Fleet size: 3
- Headquarters: Heraklion, Greece

Cretan Airlines was a short-lived airline based in Heraklion, Greece that operated from 1993 to 1995. It is not to be confused with Cretan Airways, an airline also based in Heraklion, that never started revenue flights.

== Code data ==
- IATA Code: C5
- ICAO Code: KRT
- Callsign: Cretan

== History ==
Cretan Airlines was established in 1993 by Cretan businessmen active in the tourist sector. Their aim was to run an airline for flying tourists to airports nearby their hotels. Cretan was the first Greek airline to operate Airbus A320 aircraft that were leased from Adria Airways. Although the main business was charter flights, a route from Thessaloniki to Athens and Crete was opened. Cretan also planned opening other domestic routes and a decision to order the Dornier Do-328 was made. Unfortunately, load factors during the winter months proved to be too low, thus incurring great economic losses for the company. Therefore, its owners were forced to cease operations in early 1995. At that time, the company had transported more than 100.000 passengers and had a staff of approximately 250 people.

== Services ==
Cretan Airlines operated scheduled services between Crete and cities in Germany, Italy and France.

== Fleet ==
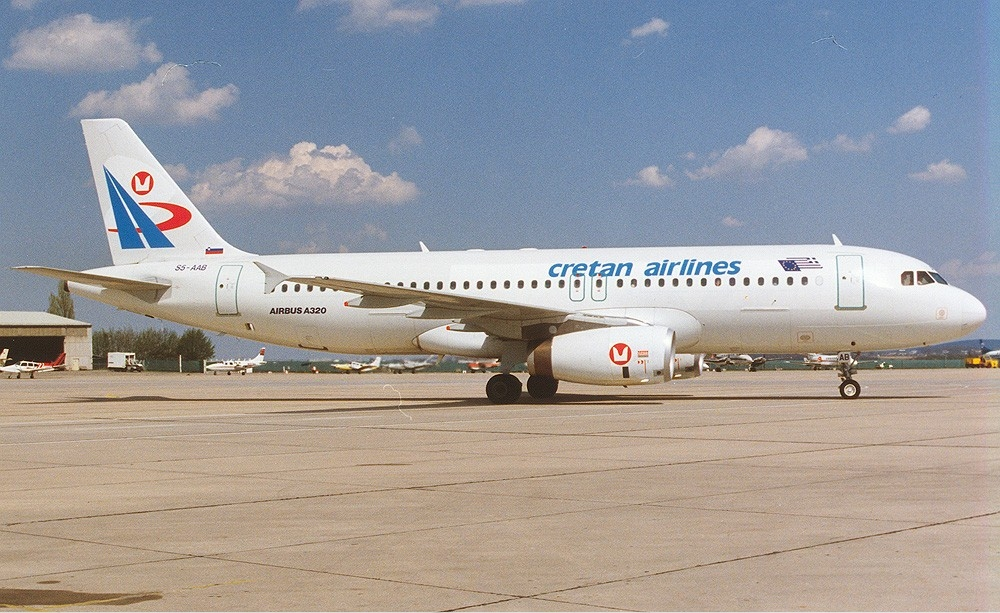

The fleet of Cretan Airlines consisted of five Airbus A320 aircraft:

- SX-BAS (S5-AAA)
- SX-BAT (S5-AAB)
- SX-BAU (S5-AAC)
- SX-BAX (N431LF, TC-ONG and N316DA)
- SX-
