= Sky Wings Airlines =

Greek charter airline

Sky Wings
IATA	ICAO	Call sign
ND	GSW	ARROW JET
- Founded: 2004
- Ceased operations: 2012
- AOC #: GR-023
- Hubs: Athens International Airport
- Fleet size: 7
- Headquarters: Athens, Greece
- Website: www.skywings.gr

Sky Wings was a Greek charter airline that was founded in 2004 and started operations in June 2006. Sky Wings was owned by Greek (51%) and Ukrainian interests namely Khors Aircompany (49%). In December 2012, Sky Wings suspended flights, passing its scheduled flights to Khors Aircompany.

== Destinations ==
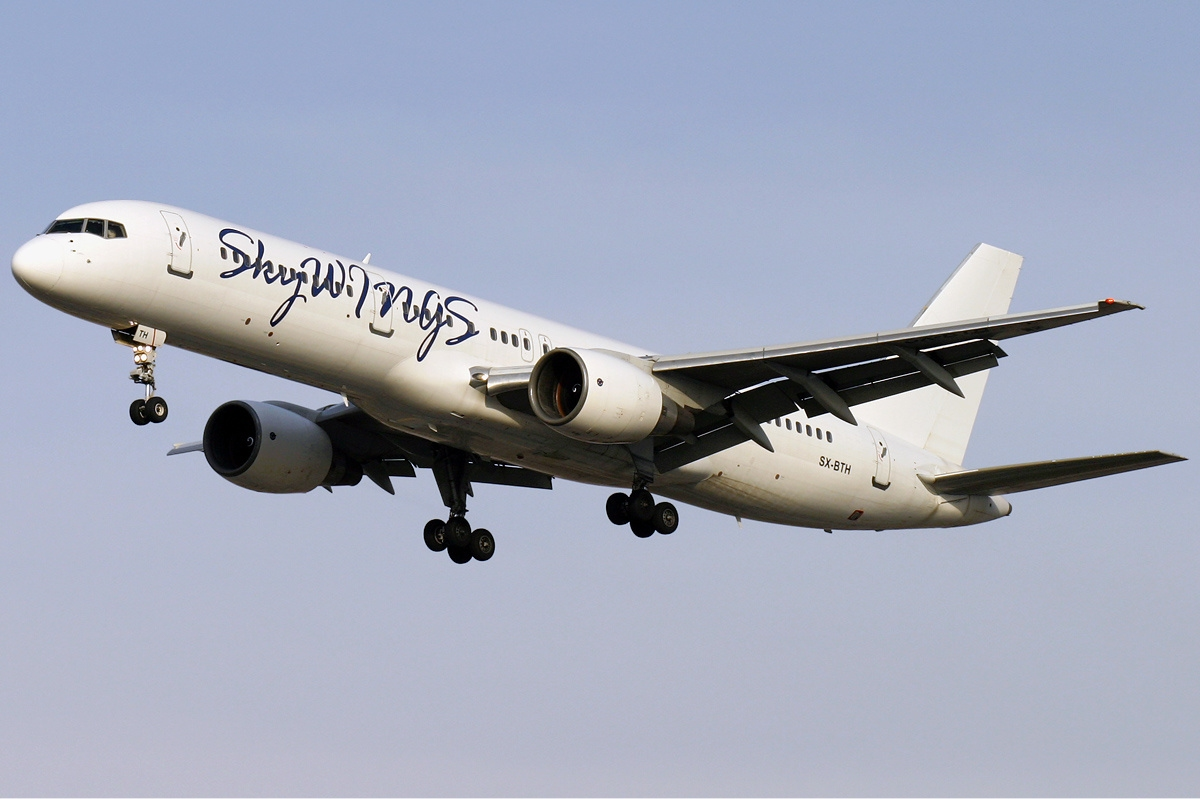
Sky Wings Airlines Boeing 757-200, Tehran - Mehrabad International Airport

Sky Wings Airlines serves the following scheduled destinations (at August 2011):

- Greece
  - Athens – Athens International Airport Hub
- Ukraine
  - Kyiv – Kyiv Zhuliany Airport
  - Lviv – Lviv International Airport
  - Odesa - Odesa International Airport
