= Saga Airlines =

IATA	ICAO	Call sign
H3	SGX	SAGA
- Founded: 2004
- Ceased operations: 2013
- Operating bases: Istanbul
- Secondary hubs: Antalya; Bodrum; Dalaman
- Fleet size: 0
- Destinations: 0
- Headquarters: Istanbul, Turkey
- Key people: Abdülkadir Kolot (chairman); Musa Alioglu (vice chairman); Ali Birhan Temel (managing director)
- Website: www.sagaairlines.com

Saga Airlines was a charter airline based in Istanbul, Turkey, which served the tourism industry.

== History ==
The airline was established in 2004 and started operations in June 2004. It was owned by Abdulkadir Kolot. Saga Airlines ceased its operations in 2013.

== Operations ==
Saga Airlines operated an extensive programme of charter flights between Turkey and Northern European countries on behalf of various tour operators. They also supplied aircraft for lease to other airlines.

== Fleet ==
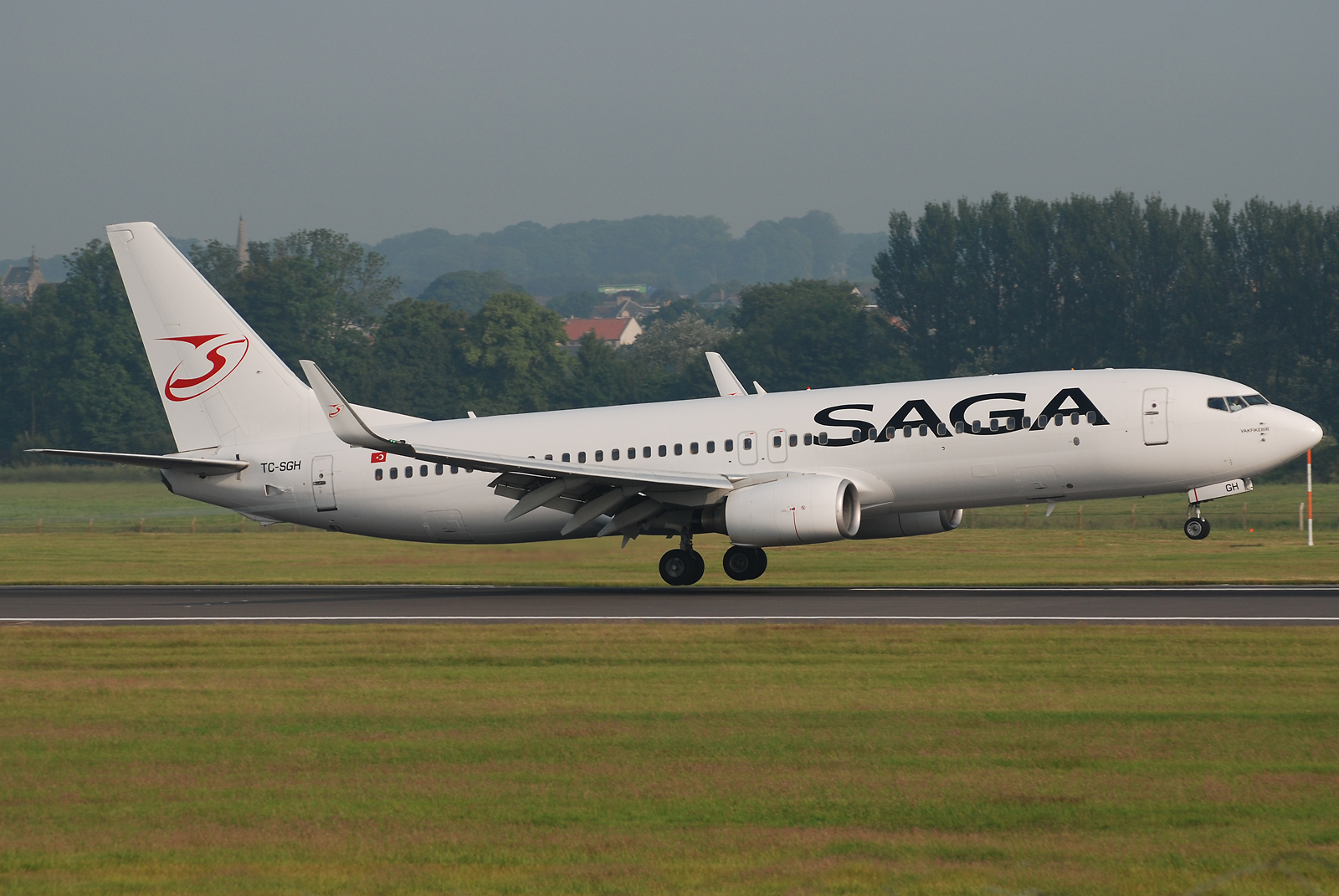
Former Saga Airlines Boeing 737-800

As of May 2013, Saga Airlines operated no aircraft as its last active Airbus A320 has been returned to its lessor.

=== Retired fleet ===
- Airbus A300B2, went to Mahan Airlines in 2006
- Airbus A310-300, went to Iran Air Tours in 2012
- Airbus A320-200, returned to lessor in 2013
- Airbus A330-300, went to Air Transat in 2011
- Boeing 737-400, left fleet in 2010
- Boeing 737-800, left fleet in 2012
