= Fly Hellas =

Greek charter airline active 2010–2011

IATA	ICAO	Call sign
VQ	VKH	DELPHI
- Founded: 2009 (as Viking Hellas)
- Commenced operations: February 2010
- Ceased operations: 5 December 2011
- Operating bases: Athens International Airport (HQ)
- Secondary hubs: Manchester Airport
- Fleet size: 1
- Destinations: 28
- Headquarters: Athens, Greece
- Key people: Christian Tadjeran (President & CEO)

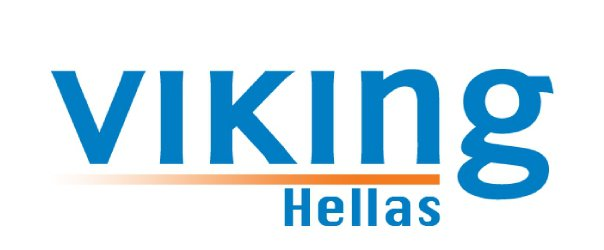
Viking Hellas logo used just before rebranding

Viking Hellas original logo used 2010–2011

Fly Hellas (formerly Viking Hellas Airlines) was a privately owned charter airline. Its main base was Athens International Airport.

== History ==
In October 2009 Viking Hellas was created and awarded their air operators certificate by the Hellenic CAA.

On 1 February 2010 operations commenced with a single McDonnell Douglas MD-83 undertaking scheduled and charter flights throughout Europe. An order for two Airbus A320-200s was announced soon thereafter.

In October 2010, its parent Viking Airlines ceased operations, attempting to resume operations in March 2011. This did not happen. During this time, in February 2011 Viking Hellas announced that it would be re-branded as FlyHellas to distance itself from the Viking Airlines A.B group. The airline officially changed its name to Fly Hellas on 1 May 2011. The airline also announced that it would close its base at Gatwick Airport, however they would open a base at Manchester Airport.

On 2 November 2011, Fly Hellas announced that due to financial difficulties they were to stop all flights for November 2011, hoping to return in December. On 5 December, it was announced that Fly Hellas would not be restarting flights but would permanently cease all operations and enter into administration. All four aircraft were returned to their lessors.

== Fleet ==
The Fly Hellas fleet included the following aircraft as of November 2011:

Fly Hellas fleet
Aircraft	In Fleet	Orders	Passengers	Notes
Airbus A320-200	1	0	180	
Boeing 737-700	1	0	180	Leased from AWAS
Total	1	0	21.2	

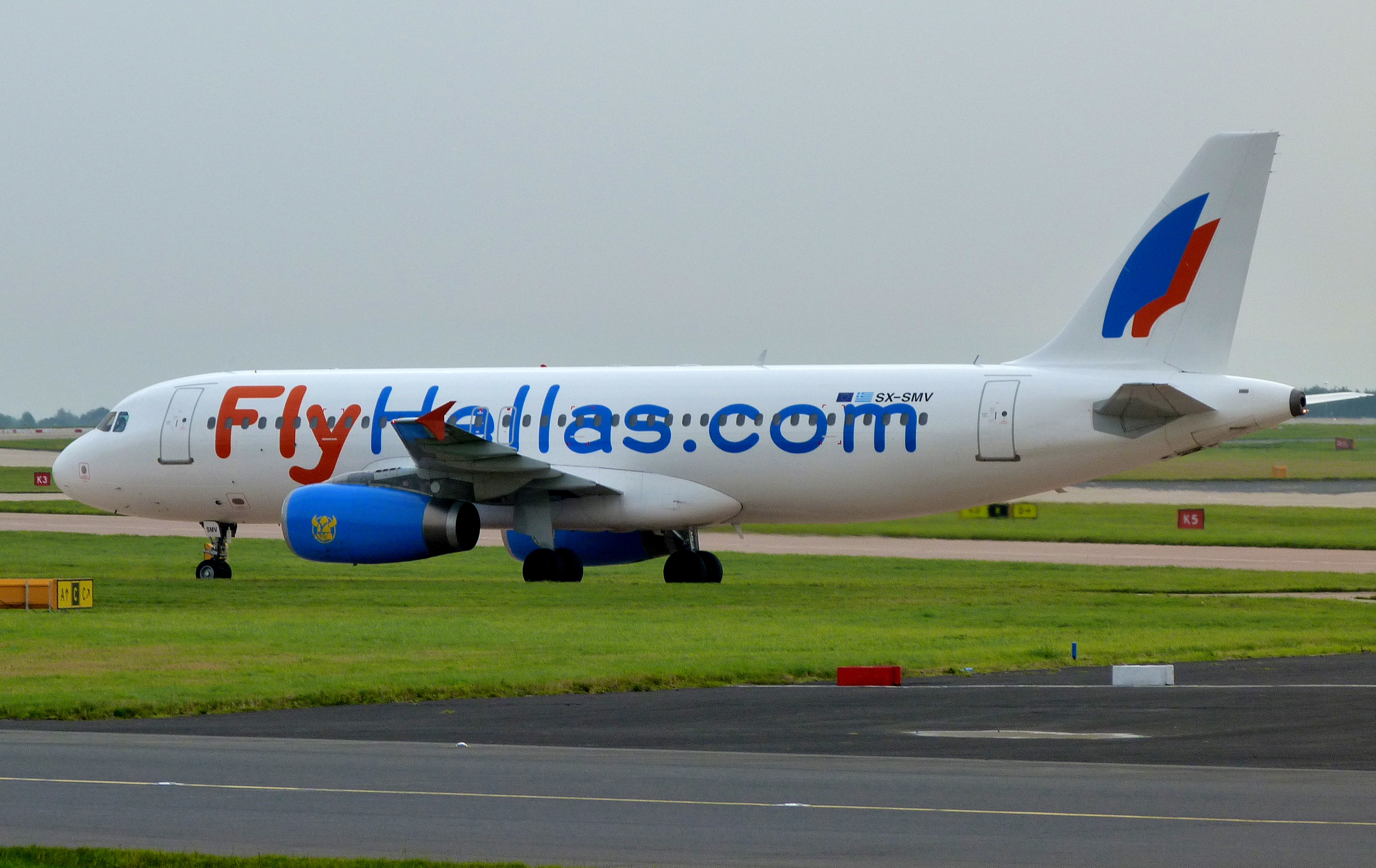
A Fly Hellas Airbus A320-200

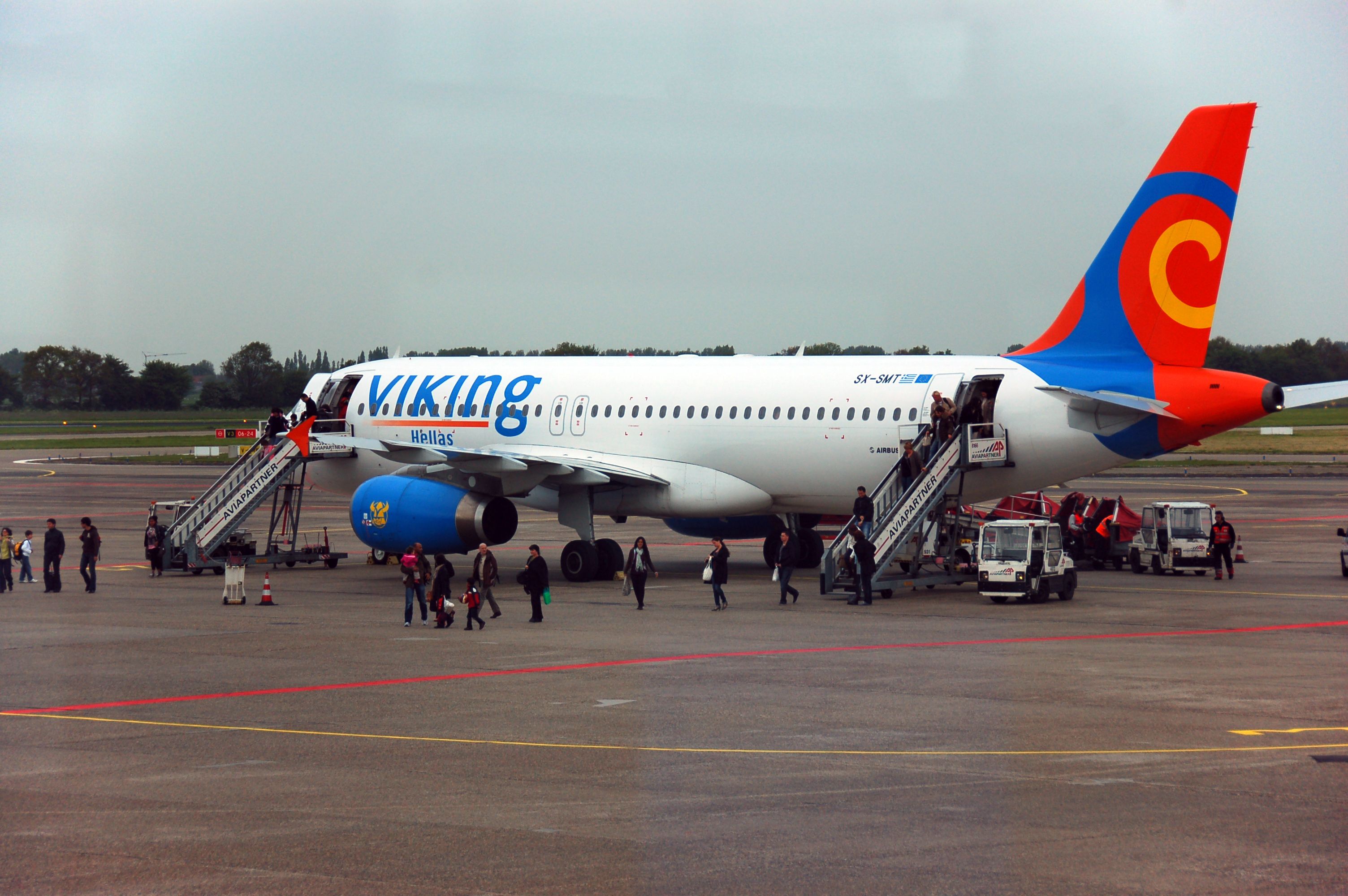
A Viking Hellas Airbus A320 (2010)
