= Khors Air =

Ukrainian airline

Khors Air авіакомпанія Хорс
IATA	ICAO	Call sign
- KO (former); X9 (former)	KHO	Khors Aircompany
- Founded: 1990
- Ceased operations: 2022
- Operating bases: Igor Sikorsky Kyiv International Airport
- Headquarters: Kyiv, Ukraine

Khors Air (Ukrainian: Авіакомпанія Хорс) was an airline based in Kyiv, Ukraine. It operated mainly charter flights within Ukraine, and also offered flights to Europe and the Middle East from Kyiv International Airport.

== History ==
The airline was founded and began operations in 1990 using Ilyushin Il-76, Yakovlev Yak-40, Antonov An-24 and Antonov An-26 aircraft, since then mainly serving the CIS. In 1992, an Antonov An-12 was purchased. In 2000, Khors Air replaced its ageing fleet of Soviet aircraft with American-built McDonnell Douglas DC-9-51 aircraft and, from 2004, McDonnell Douglas MD-82.

In 2005, a Kyiv to Dubai, Malé and Jakarta service was started using a Boeing 757-200ER aircraft but soon had to be halted.

In 2017, the United States proposed sanctions against Khors Air due to them leasing out aircraft to airlines in Iran.

As of 2022, the airline ceased all operations during war.

== Destinations ==
Most flights operated by the airline were non-scheduled charter flights.

== Fleet ==
=== Historic fleet ===
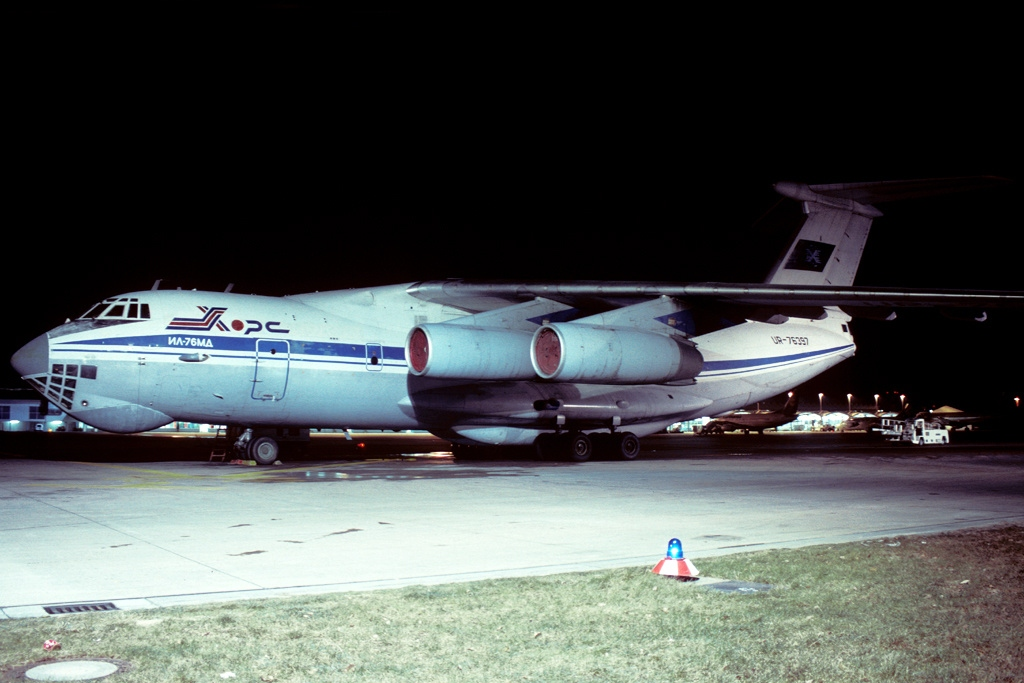
A Khors Air Ilyushin Il-76 in 1996

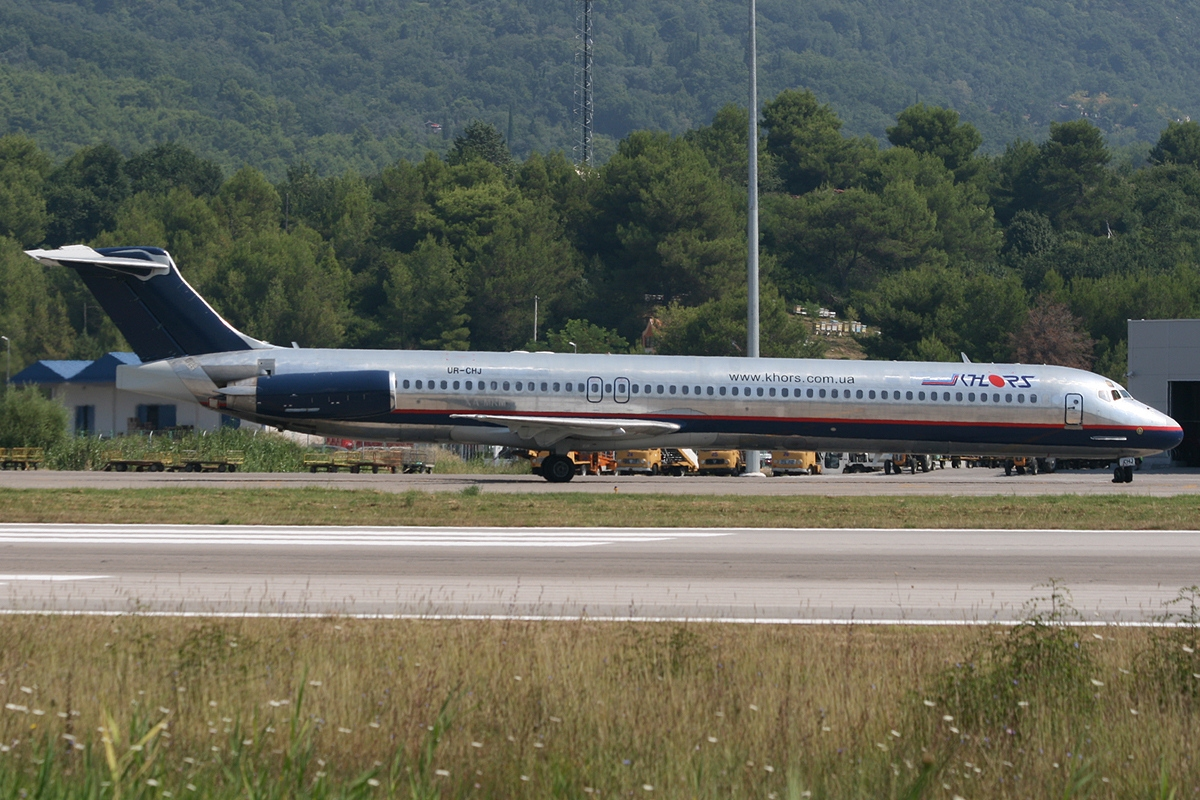
Khors Air McDonnell Douglas MD-82

- Airbus A319
- Airbus A320
- Airbus A321
- Antonov An-12
- Antonov An-24
- Antonov An-26
- Boeing 737-300
- Boeing 737-500
- Boeing 757-200
- Ilyushin Il-76
- McDonnell Douglas DC-9
- McDonnell Douglas MD-82
- McDonnell Douglas MD-83
- McDonnell Douglas MD-88
- Yakovlev Yak-40
