= Air Scotland =

Scottish low-cost airline

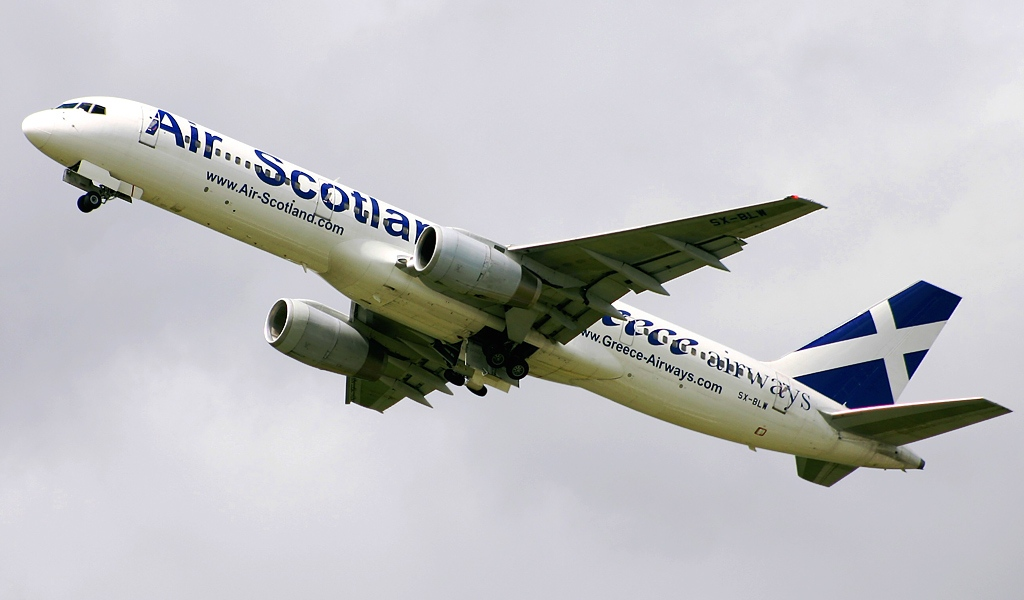
- Boeing 757-200 departing Glasgow Airport, Scotland
IATA	ICAO	Call sign
-	GRE	GREECE AIRWAYS
- Founded: November 2002
- Commenced operations: 29 March 2003
- Ceased operations: October 2005
- Operating bases: Glasgow Airport
- Focus cities: Manchester Airport
- Fleet size: 6 (at closure)
- Destinations: 17
- Headquarters: Glasgow, Scotland
- Key people: Dhia Al-Ani (founder)

Air Scotland was a short-lived Scottish company based in Glasgow, Scotland offering low-cost airline travel. From 2002 to 2005 it had a role in scheduled services from Glasgow Airport, and other UK airports, to the Mediterranean and Athens. It initially made use of the air operator's certificate of the charter company Electra Airways, a Greek registered company and licensed by the Greek Civil Aviation Authority.

== History ==
Air Scotland was established by Iraqi-born businessman Dhia Al-Ani to provide direct routes from Scotland to Spanish airports. They planned to start operating from March 2003 using two Boeing 757-200 aircraft operated by the Greek charter company Electra Airlines. The company was established in November 2002 and started operations on 29 March 2003. The company was essentially operating as a ticket provider for Electra Airlines until 25 April 2003, when the Electra aircraft were grounded by BAA plc over debts owed to the airport operator. The Greek Civil Aviation Authority suspended their Operating Licence and AOC in December 2006. Air Scotland ceased the agreement with Electra and began operating with Air Holland, who agreed to resume operation of the former Electra routes. With the demise of Air Holland, it then began operating under the air operator's certificate of Greece Airways, which was formed out of Electra and owned by Al-Ani, albeit with only one 757 aircraft. All aircraft (before 2006) that have operated for Air Scotland have carried the operator's livery of white fuselage with the Flag of Scotland design on the aircraft tailfin.

Under Al-Ani's ownership, there were reports of Air Scotland looking to lease two Lockheed L-1011 Tristar to utilise on services from Glasgow to Miami, New York City and Cuba, and to fly between Glasgow and London Stansted Airport to Baghdad, but these failed to materialise. Reportedly the airline last flight was in December 2006.

At the start of October 2005, Al-Ani sold his stake in the airline to H Top Hotels Group of Barcelona, Spain. However, administrative difficulties in transferring ownership of the airline resulted in the operator's solitary aircraft being grounded at Palma over unpaid fuel bills. Passengers were left stranded for up to 17 hours and in one instance armed police were called to calm angry passengers delayed in Palma. The knock-on effect to the airline's network as a result of the delay was considerable. An aircraft was chartered from Fischer Air Polska to help clear the backlog, but returned to Poland empty after the pilot refused service to Air Scotland as he believed that they had not paid. Air Scotland had in fact transferred money to Fischer Air Polska's account that morning.

== See also ==
- List of defunct airlines of the United Kingdom
