= Orange2Fly =

IATA	ICAO	Call sign
O4	OTF	ORANGESKY
- Founded: September 2015
- Ceased operations: September 2021
- Fleet size: 1
- Destinations: charter
- Headquarters: Athens, Greece
- Website: orange2fly.com

Orange2Fly was a Greek charter airline offering wet lease, charter and ad hoc flights headquartered at Athens International Airport, until it ceased all operations in September 2021.

== History ==
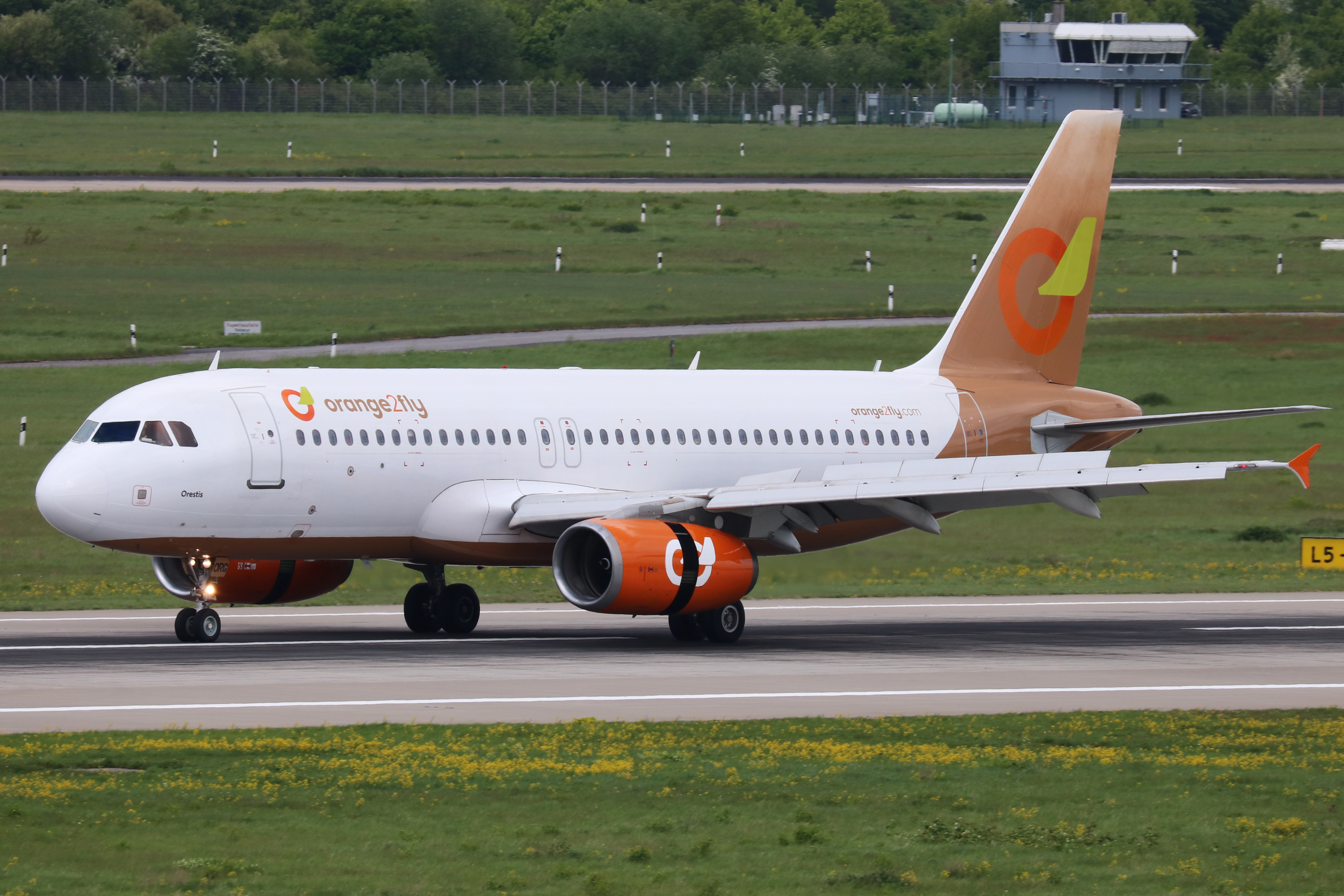
Orange2Fly Airbus A320-200

The airline was founded in September 2015 by Greek investor Pantelis Sofianos. It received its first aircraft, an Airbus A320-200, in June 2016 and started operations on 20 July 2016. The airline's fleet had grown to include four Airbus A320 aircraft by December 2018.

In early 2020, Orange2fly ended all flights at Pristina International Airport Adem Jashari, where it operated four scheduled routes to Germany and Switzerland and was the fifth largest airline in 2019.

The company was granted court protection from creditors in October 2020. As of January 2021, Orange2fly suspended all operations with plans for a restructuring. In February 2021, the Greek government declined to offer a loan. In September 2021, the company filed for bankruptcy and shut down.

== Destinations ==
Orange2Fly offered charter services on behalf of tour operators and other airlines and also used to operate scheduled routes from Pristina which have since ceased.

== Fleet ==
As of January 2021, the Orange2Fly fleet consisted of the following aircraft:

Orange2Fly Fleet
Aircraft	In service	Orders	Seats	Notes
Airbus A320-200	1	—	180	stored
Total	1	—	—	
