= Minoan Air =

Greek airline

| IATA | ICAO | Call sign |
|---|---|---|
| - | MAV | MINOAN |
- Founded: September 7, 2011; Glyfada, Attica, Greece
- Commenced operations: 2012
- Ceased operations: 2015
- AOC #: GR-045
- Hubs: Heraklion International Airport
- Fleet size: 4
- Destinations: 9
- Headquarters: Heraklion, Greece
- Key people: George Mavrantonakis(Chairman); Marcos Caramalengos (Chief Commercial Officer)
- Website: Archived official website at the Wayback Machine (archived 2018-04-16)

Minoan Air S.A., also known as Μινωικές Αερογραμμές in Greek, was a Greek regional airline headquartered in Heraklion, Crete and based at Heraklion International Airport.

== History ==
Minoan Air was founded in September 2011. One of the key people was George Mavrantonakis, co-founder of Sky Express, former Chief Operating Officer and Accountable Manager of Olympic Airlines and former Advisor to the President of the same airline. The company was granted an air operator's certificate on 30 December 2011 and its first base was Heraklion International Airport.

In June 2012 Minoan Air based an airliner in Spain (in either Burgos Airport or León Airport) to operate charter flights for Spanish tour operator Good Fly. In July 2012 the company started operating all-year round flights from their base in Heraklion to Kos and Rhodes and seasonal flights to Mytilene and Santorini. In October/November 2012, the airline wet-leased one of their aircraft to Flyglinjen.

In January 2013, Minoan Air announced it would open two new bases outside of Greece, London Oxford Airport on 4 March 2013 and Lugano Airport on 29 March 2013. Minoan flew from London Oxford to Dublin and Edinburgh until 4 August 2013, while flights to Rome-Fiumicino and Vienna have been operated from Lugano. In September 2013 it has been announced that all flights to and from Lugano have been terminated. Since then, it concentrated on Greek domestic routes.

In November 2015, Minoan Air suspended all operations until further notice due to the impact of the Greek financial crisis.

== Destinations ==
Minoan Air served the following scheduled domestic destinations as of July 2015:

Greece

- Athens
- Alexandroupoli
- Heraklion base
- Kos
- Mykonos
- Mytiline
- Rhodes
- Santorini
- Thessaloniki

== Fleet ==
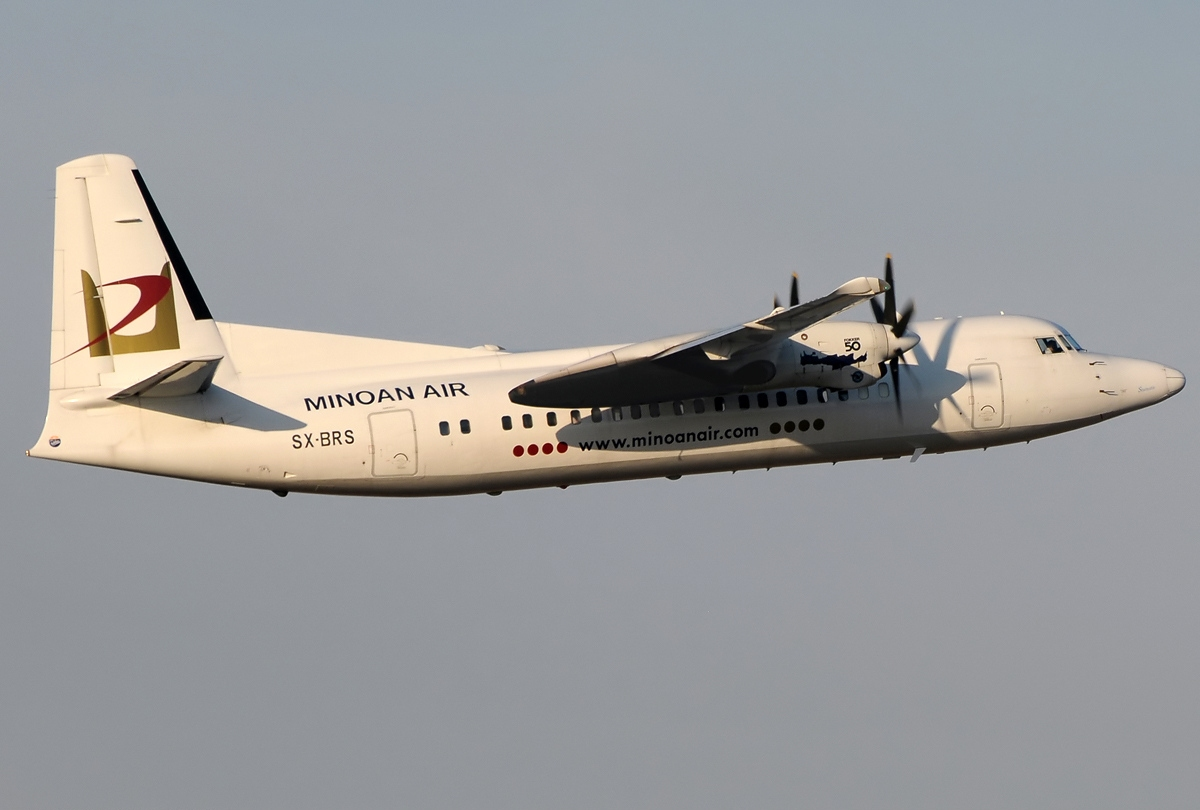
Minoan Air Fokker 50

The Minoan Air fleet consists of the following aircraft (as of August 2016):

Minoan Air fleet
| Aircraft | In service | Orders | Passengers |
|---|---|---|---|
| Fokker 50 | 4 | — | 50 |
| Total | 4 | — |
