= Hellenic Airlines =

Hellenic Airlines "Hellas" S.A. Ελληνικαί Αεροπορικαί Συγκοινωνίαι ΕΛΛ·Α·Σ Α.Ε.
IATA	ICAO	Call sign
HL	HLN	HELLENIC
- Founded: 1947
- Ceased operations: 1951
- Hubs: Athens Hellenikon Airport
- Fleet size: 8
- Destinations: 16
- Headquarters: Athens, Greece
- Key people: General Tsarpalis

Hellenic Airlines (Greek: Ελληνικαί Αεροπορικαί Συγκοινωνίαι, also known by its literal name, Greek Air Transport), often abbreviated ΕΛΛ.Α.Σ. in Greek and sometimes also known as Hellas in English, was a Greek-flagged airline that operated domestic and international airline service from 1947 to 1951. It was absorbed into TAE Greek National Airlines in 1951.

== History ==
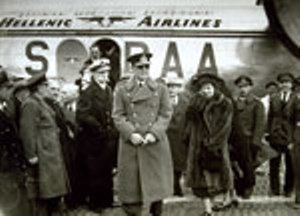
The delivery of a refurbished B-24 Liberator to Hellenic Airlines at Heathrow Airport in 1947. King Paul of Greece, who had just ascended the throne, and Queen Frederika are in the background.

In the post-World War II era, in order to foster competition in the Greek airline industry, the Greek government chartered a total of 4 airlines; Technical and Aeronautical Exploitations (Greek: Τεχνικαί Αεροπορικαί Εκμεταλλεύσεις), or TAE, was a privately owned airline that had ceased operation prior to the Second World War but had resumed operations. Hellenic Airlines was founded in 1947, along with Air Transport of Greece (Greek: Αεροπορικαί Μεταφοραί Ελλάδος) and Daedalus Airlines (Greek: Δαίδαλος).

Hellenic Airlines was a joint-operation with Scottish Aviation, Ltd., which took a 40% stake in the company and the Greek state and armed forces jointly held 60% of the company. From its base in Prestwick, Scotland, Scottish Aviation trained the Greek crews and maintained the company's fleet.

Hellenic Airlines operated twice-weekly services from Glasgow/Prestwick to Athens via London, Paris and Rome using their B-24 Liberator (leased from Scottish Airlines) which also served Alexandria, Cairo and for a brief time, Tel Aviv. DC-3 Dakotas served the domestic markets and Nicosia, Cyprus starting in March 1948.

The Greek airline market in the 1940s and 50s was not robust and the Greek Civil War continued to disrupt transportation and all four airlines struggled to stay aloft. By 1950, Daedalus had gone bankrupt. Due to the financial difficulties of all three remaining carriers and to ensure that Greece maintained a Greek-flagged carrier, in 1951, the Greek government forced the merger of all three companies into TAE Greek National Airlines.

== Destinations ==
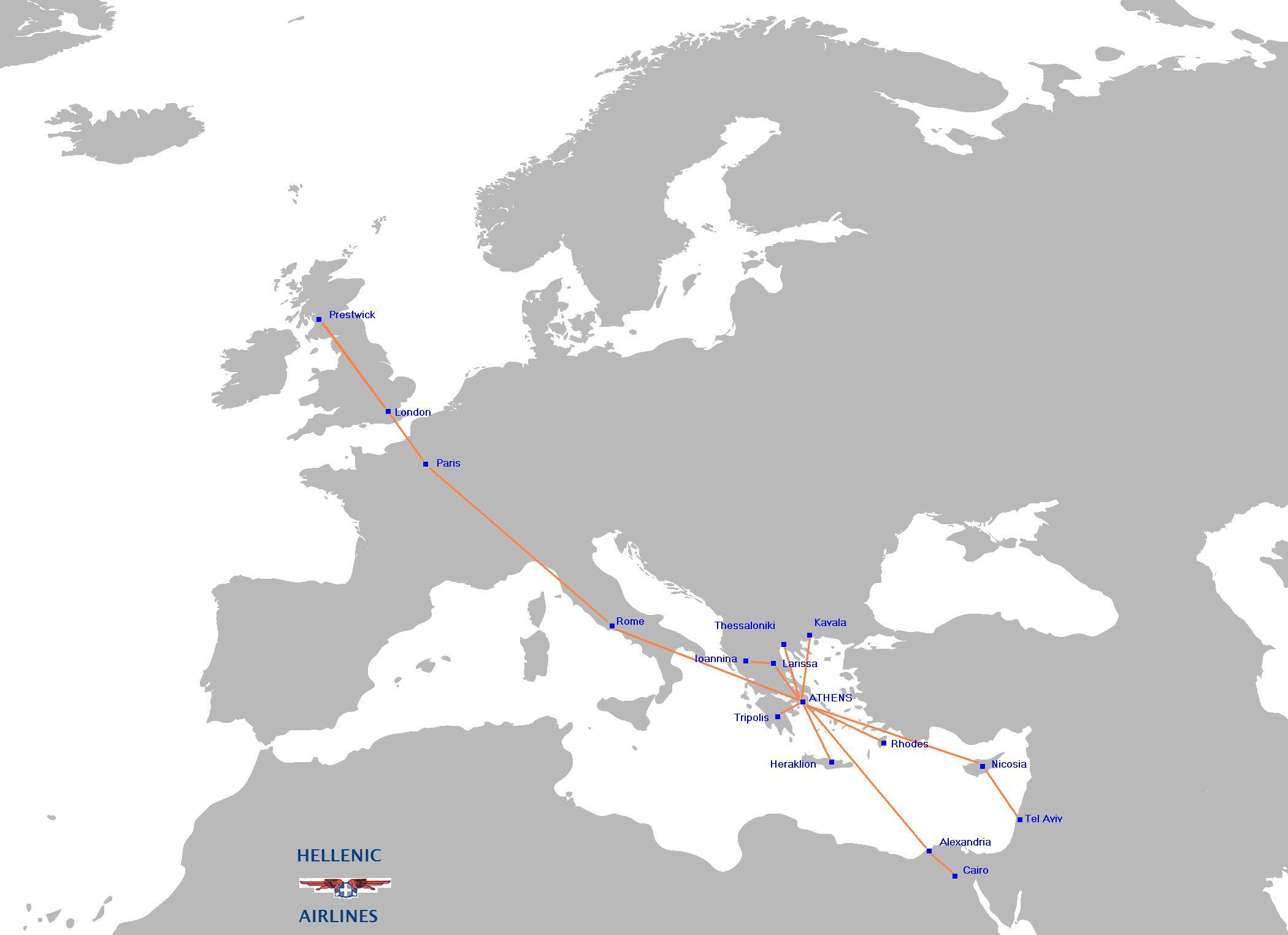
Hellenic Airlines route map from 1950

Hellenic Airlines flew from Scotland to Greece and beyond to Egypt, Cyprus and Israel.

=== Domestic service ===
Greece
- Athens
- Heraklion
- Ioannina
- Kavala
- Larissa
- Rhodes
- Thessaloniki
- Tripoli

=== International service ===
Egypt

- Alexandria
- Cairo

United Kingdom

- Glasgow (Edinburgh)
- London

Cyprus

- Nicosia

France

- Paris

Italy

- Rome

Israel

- Tel Aviv

== Fleet ==
The fleet consisted on one converted ex-B-24 Liberator used on international services from London - Athens and then on to Egypt and six Douglas DC-3s used for domestic service and to Cyprus and Tel Aviv.

Hellenic Airlines fleet
Aircraft	Total	Type	Notes
Douglas DC-3	6	Propeller aircraft	
B-24 Liberator	2	Propeller aircraft	SX-DAA "Maid of Athens" SX-DAB
