= TAE National Greek Airlines =

TAE National Greek Airlines TAE Εθνικαί Αεροπορικαί Γραμμαί
IATA	ICAO	Call sign
GK	TAE	Greek
- Founded: 1951
- Ceased operations: 1957
- Hubs: Athens Hellenikon Airport
- Fleet size: 18
- Destinations: 20
- Headquarters: Athens, Greece

TAE National Greek Airlines (Greek: Τεχνικαί Αεροπορικαί Εκμεταλλεύσεις—Εθνικαί Αεροπορικαί Γραμμαί, Greek pronunciation: [te̞xniˈce̞ ae̞roporiˈce̞ e̞kme̞taˈle̞fsis e̞θniˈce̞ ae̞roporiˈce̞ ɣraˈme̞], literally Technical and Aeronautical Holdings—National Air Lines), originally branded in English as TAE National Greek Airlines, was formed by the Greek government in 1951 to be the national airline of Greece. The airline operated without competition on domestic routes in Greece and served a small number of European and Middle Eastern cities. The airline was sold to Aristotle Onassis in 1957 and he renamed the carrier Olympic Airways.

== History ==
In the post-World War II era, there were four airlines operating in Greece:

- Technical and Aeronautical Holdings – T.A.E. (Greek: Τεχνικαί Αεροπορικαί Εκμεταλλεύσεις – T.A.E.)
- Greek Air Transport/Hellenic Airlines – G.A.T. (Greek: Ελληνικαί Αεροπορικαί Συγκοινωνίαι – ΕΛΛ.Α.Σ.)
- Air Transport of Greece (Greek: Αεροπορικαί Μεταφοραί Ελλάδος – Α.Μ.Ε.)
- Daedalus Airlines (Greek: Δαίδαλος)

Of these, T.A.E., Air Transport of Greece and Daedalus Airlines were privately held and G.A.T. was publicly owned. In 1950, Daedalus Airlines ceased operations as the number of passengers for all Greek airlines declined precipitously. Due to the financial difficulties of all three carriers and to ensure that Greece maintained a Greek-flagged carrier, in 1951, the Greek government forced the merger of all three companies into TAE Greek National Airlines.

The 18 aircraft from the three merged airlines included 1 Douglas DC-4 Skymaster and the rest were Douglas DC-3 Dakotas. The DC-4 was used primarily on the bi-weekly route from Athens to Rome-Paris-London. Additionally, the airline served the Balkan cities of Belgrade and Istanbul, Nicosia in Cyprus and the Egyptian city of Alexandria.

In 1955, the airline was not performing financially and the Greek state sought unsuccessfully to find a buyer. Eventually, Aristotle Onassis agreed to buy the ailing carrier in July 1956. The company flew under the name T.A.E. until April 1957, when the airline was renamed Olympic Airways.

== Destinations ==
TAE Greek National Airlines served a number of domestic destinations in Greece, as well as international destinations.

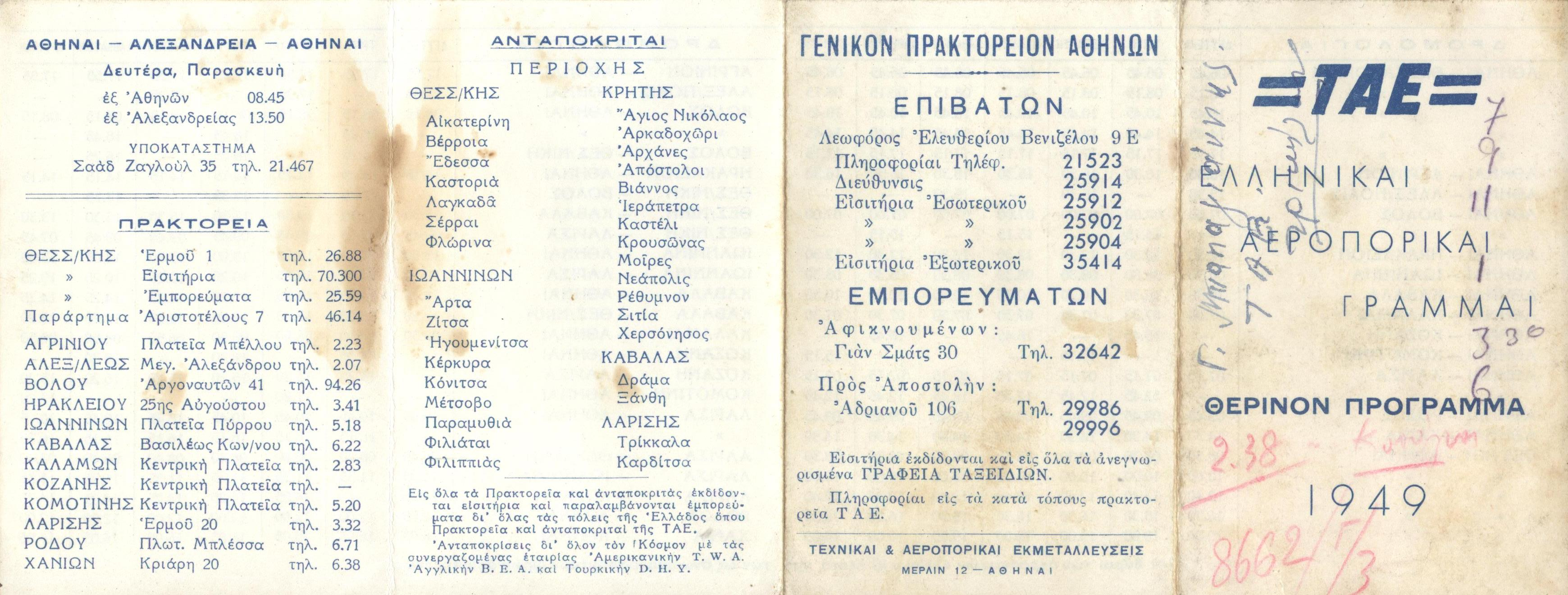
TAE Schedule

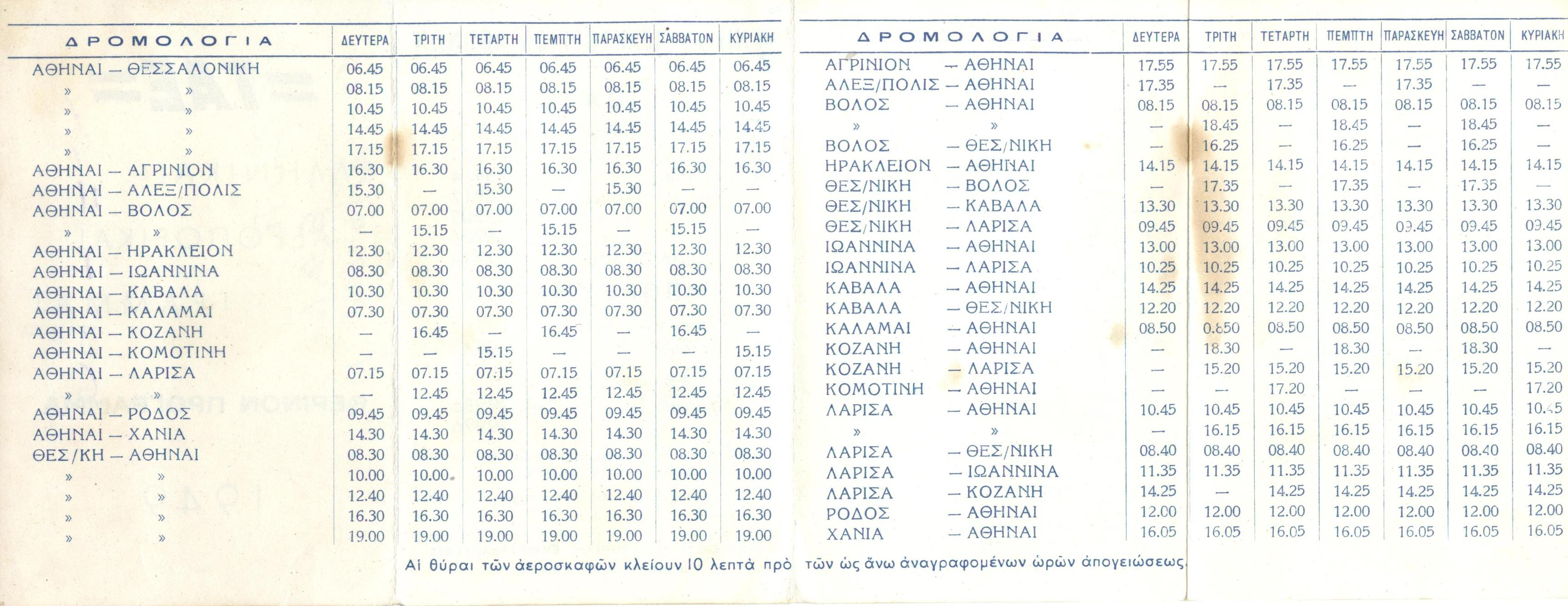
TAE Schedule

=== Domestic service ===
Greece

- Agrinion
- Alexandroupolis
- Athens
- Chania
- Ioannina
- Kavala
- Komotini
- Limnos
- Kerkyra
- Mitilini
- Heraklion
- Rhodes
- Thessaloniki

=== International service ===
Cyprus

- Nicosia

Egypt

- Alexandria

France

- Paris

Israel

- Tel Aviv

Italy

- Rome

Turkey

- Istanbul

United Kingdom

- London

(Socialist Federal Republic of Yugoslavia) Yugoslavia

- Belgrade

== Fleet ==
TAE Greek National Airline fleet
Aircraft	Total	Type	Notes
Douglas DC-3	17	Propeller aircraft	
Douglas DC-4	1	Propeller aircraft	SX-DAG
