= VLM =

VLM can refer to:

- Vastus lateralis muscle (vastus lateralis), a human muscle in the thigh
- Veículo Lançador de Microssatélites, a Brazilian launcher of satellites
- Very large memory computers
- Vic Lee Motorsport, a British motor racing team
- Virgin London Marathon
- Virginia Lee Montgomery, American artist
- Virtual Light Machine
- Virtual Loadable Module, modular drivers of Novell's 16-bit NetWare client for DOS/Windows
- Visceral larva migrans (human toxocarosis), a parasitary human disease due by Toxocara cati or Toxocara canis
- Visible light microscope, a type of microscope to magnify images by means of visible light
- Vision-language model, is a type of artificial intelligence system that can jointly interpret and generate information from both images and text, extending the capabilities of large language models (LLMs)
- VLM Airlines Slovenia, a sister airline to the Belgian VLM Airlines
- VLM Airlines, a defunct Belgian regional airline
- vorarlberg museum, the former Vorarlberger Landesmuseum in Bregez, Austria
- Vortex lattice method, a numerical method used in computational fluid dynamics
