= Blue1 =

Finnish airline

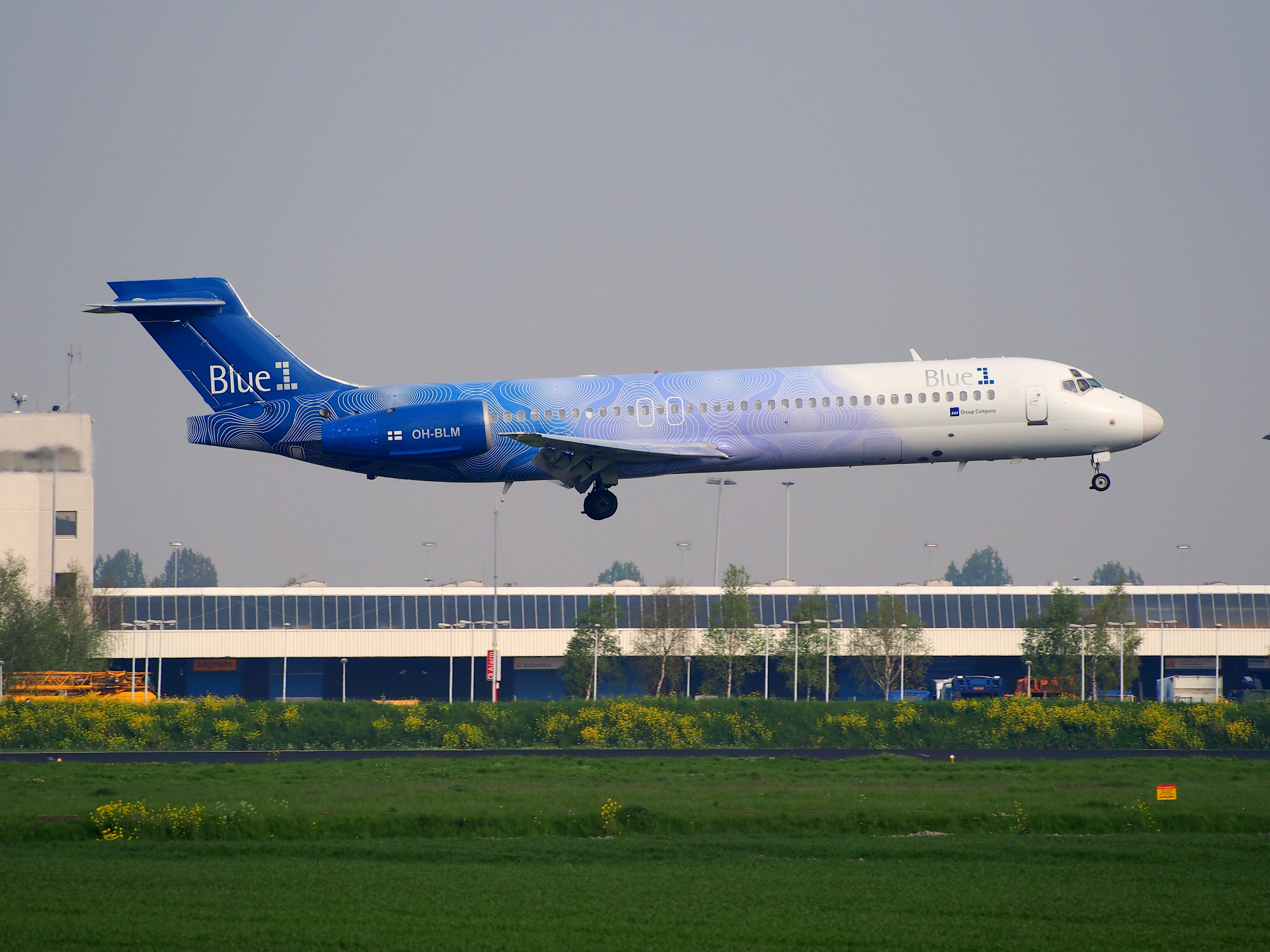
- Boeing 717
IATA	ICAO	Call sign
KF	BLF	BLUEFINN
- Founded: 1987
- Ceased operations: 2016 (merged into CityJet)
- Frequent-flyer program: EuroBonus
- Alliance: Star Alliance (affiliate); Regional member 2004–2009; Full member 2009–2012; Affiliate member 2012–2015
- Fleet size: 17
- Destinations: 28
- Parent company: CityJet
- Headquarters: Vantaa, Finland
- Key people: Janne Hattula, CEO
- Employees: 350

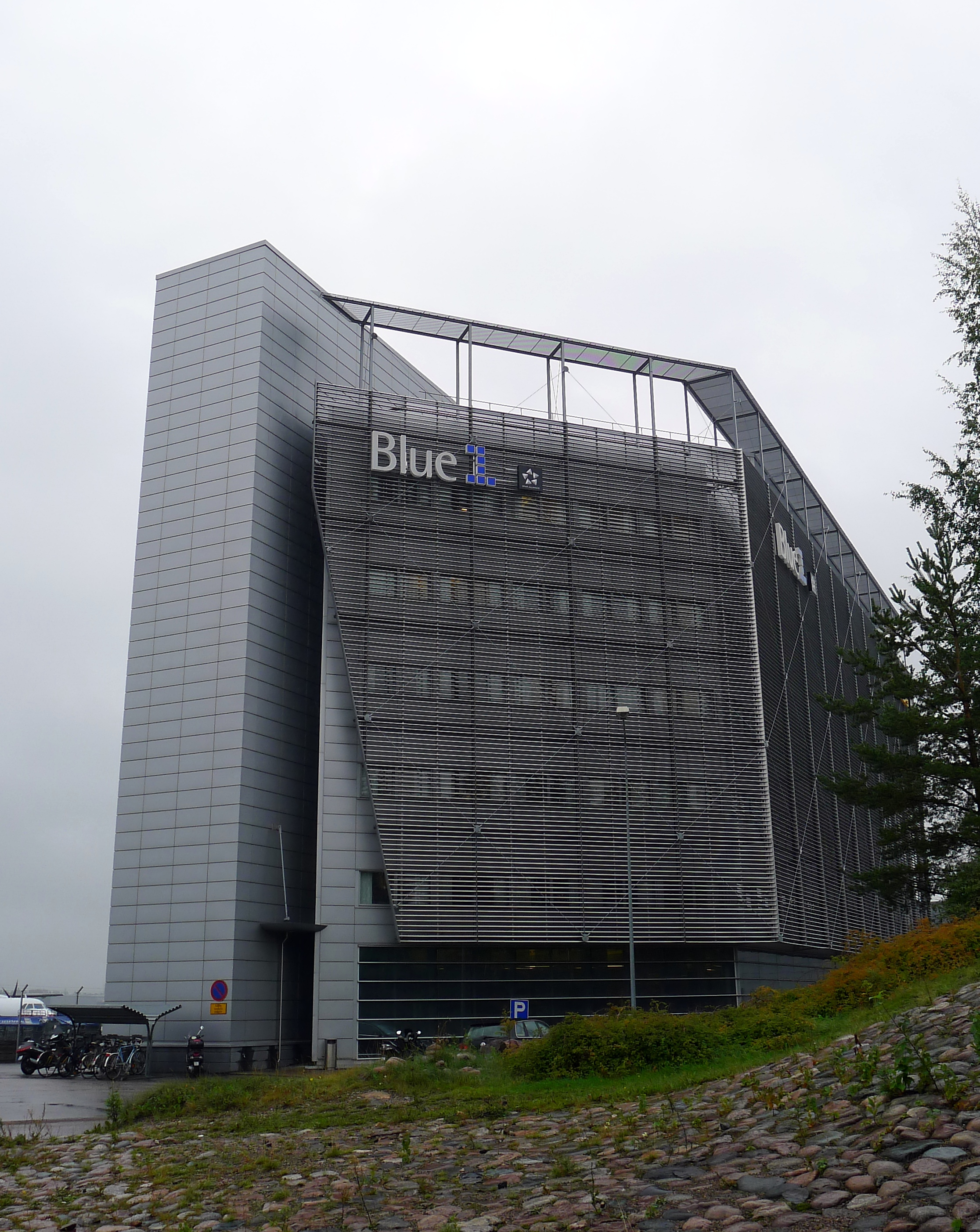
Headquarters in Vantaa (Helsinki)

Blue1 O/Y was a Finnish airline owned by Irish air carrier CityJet. The airline was a member of Star Alliance and had its head office in Vantaa. It had been a subsidiary of SAS Group and flew to around 28 destinations in Europe, mainly from its base at Helsinki Airport. It carried over 1.7 million passengers in 2011.

== History ==
=== Early years ===
Air Botnia was established in 1987 and started operations in June 1988, flying Embraer EMB-110 Bandeirantes on night cargo flights and on passenger services from Helsinki to Kauhajoki and Seinäjoki. It started to supplement its unpressurised Bandeirantes with leased British Aerospace Jetstream 31s in 1993, but cash flow problems in the summer of 1995 caused British Aerospace to repossess the Jetstreams and brought Air Botnia to the eve of bankruptcy, but it continued operations in a reduced scale.

The airline was purchased by SAS Group in January 1998, who replaced its Jetstreams with Saab 340s later that year. Air Botnia received its first jets, Fokker F28 Fellowships, in 1999. Because their high noise levels restricted operations, in 2001 the elderly F28s were replaced by Avro RJ85s. At the same time the Saab 340s were replaced by larger Saab 2000s.

=== Development since 2004 ===
Air Botnia was renamed Blue 1 O/Y in January 2004, and joined Star Alliance as its first regional member on 3 November of that same year. The air carrier became a full member of Star Alliance on 1 January 2009 but left it in November 2012 and became an affiliate of Scandinavian Airlines.

In 2005 Blue1 became the second-largest Finnish airline with more than 100 daily flights and the biggest operator between Finland and the Nordic nations Sweden, Denmark and Norway. In 2006 Blue1 started 10 new non-stop routes to Europe increasing its total capacity by more than 50%. In 2008 Blue1 moved its London operations from Stansted to Heathrow Airport, and expanded its domestic business routes. In 2009 new routes to Lapland, including Paris-Kittilä were opened for the winter season and routes to Biarritz, Dubrovnik and Split for summer travel.

Blue1 was the first network airline in Northern Europe to be granted ISO 14001 environmental certificate. On 1 November 2012, Blue1 became a service producer for SAS. This means that marketing and sales were then handled by SAS and its flights carried the SAS flight prefix "SK".

In March 2015, it was announced that Blue1 was to sell their entire fleet of Boeing 717-200s to Volotea and Delta Air Lines and was to replace them with Boeing 737-600s from its parent, Scandinavian Airlines, however Scandinavian Airlines later cancelled the plan and evaluated the transfer some Bombardier CRJ900 from Cimber.

In October 2015, Scandinavian Airlines (SAS) announced the sale of Blue1 to CityJet from Ireland, which was to operate the company on behalf of SAS as part of a larger relationship. Flight operations were halted on 31 October. By December, Blue1 had no more aircraft and its own website was redirected to SAS's website. In 2016, Blue1 was dissolved and assets merged into its new parent CityJet.

== Onboard services ==
Blue1 offered two service classes, Economy and Economy Extra (previously Blue1 Premium).

- Economy Class: Coffee and tea were included on all Blue1 operated flights. Sandwiches and other drinks were available for purchase from "Cafe1". Flights with short flight time had reduced service.
- Economy Extra: Fast Track security and Business Class check-in was included where available.

== Fleet ==
As of December 2015, before its actual dissolution, Blue1 did not operate any aircraft, as the Boeing 717-200s previously operated had been phased out without replacement.

Previously Blue1 also operated the following aircraft types:

Aircraft type	Years active
Boeing 717-200	2010–2015
ATR-72	2009–2012
McDonnell Douglas MD-90	2006–2011
Avro RJ100	2003–2009
Avro RJ85	2003–2013
Saab 2000	2001–2006
Fokker F28	1999–2001
Saab 340	1998–2001
Jetstream 31	1993–1998
Embraer EMB-110 Bandeirante	1987–1993
Cessna 402	1987–1988

=== Air Botnia gallery ===
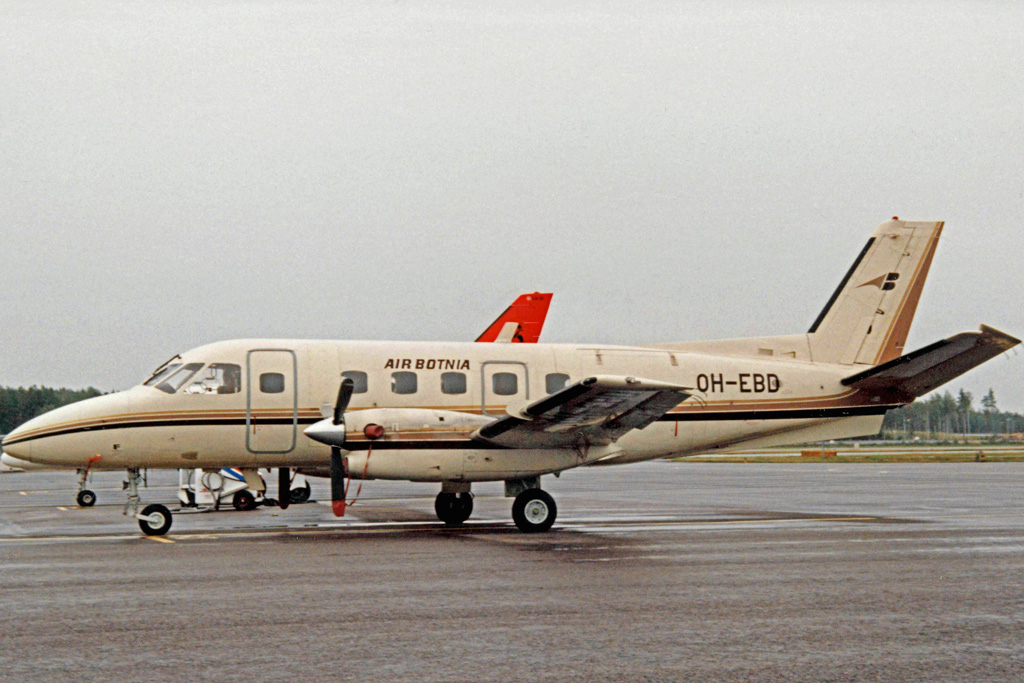
Embraer EMB-110 Bandeirante at Helsinki-Vantaa airport in 1994

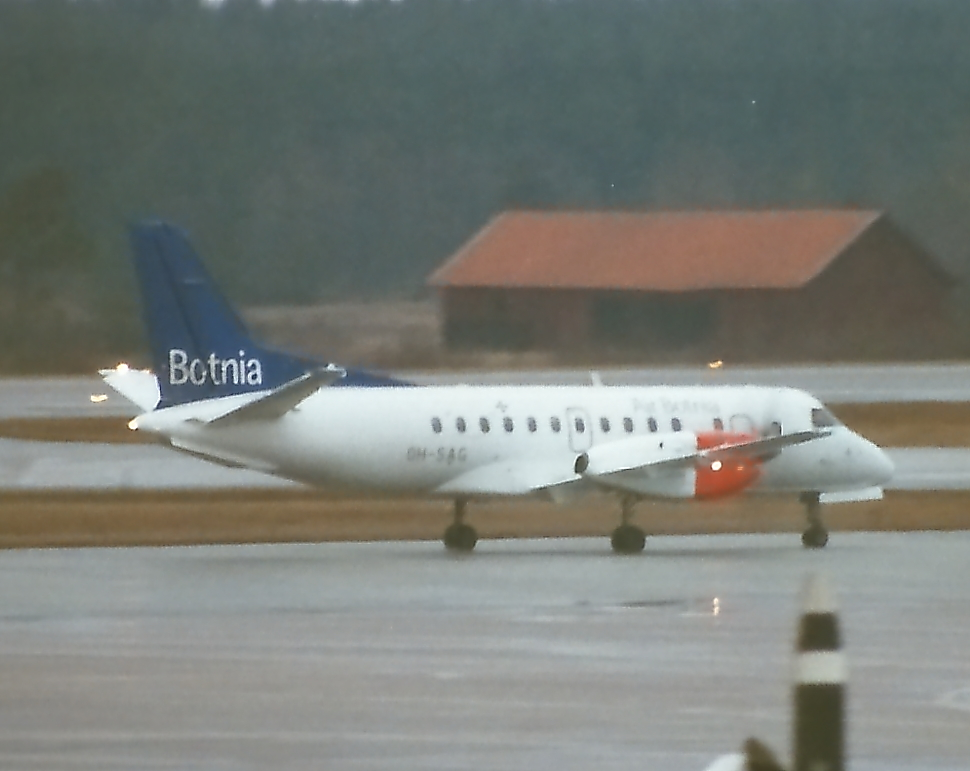
Saab 340

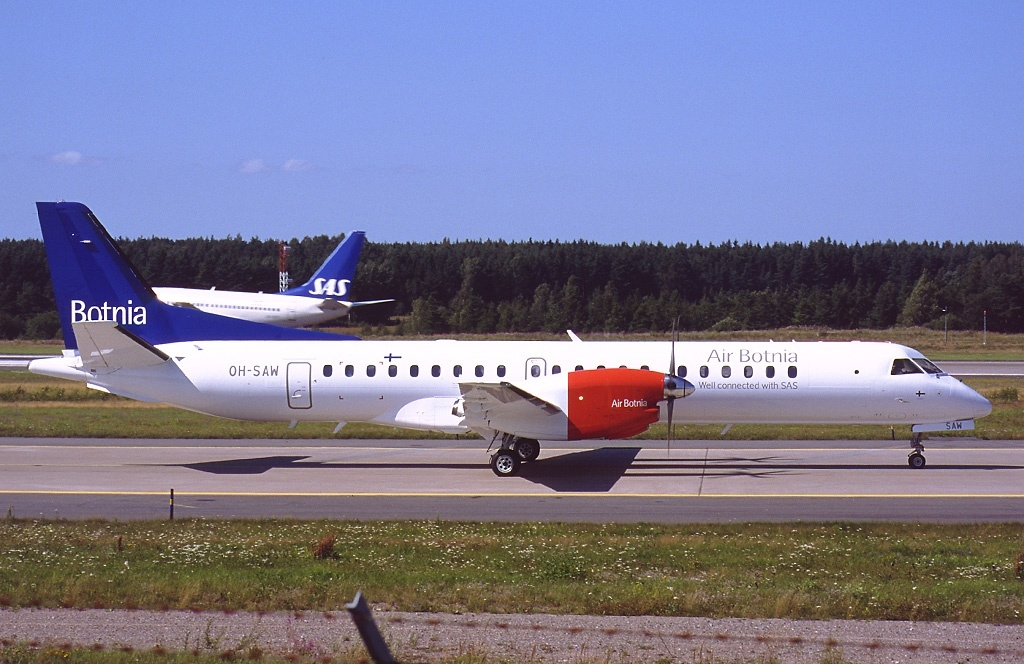
Saab 2000

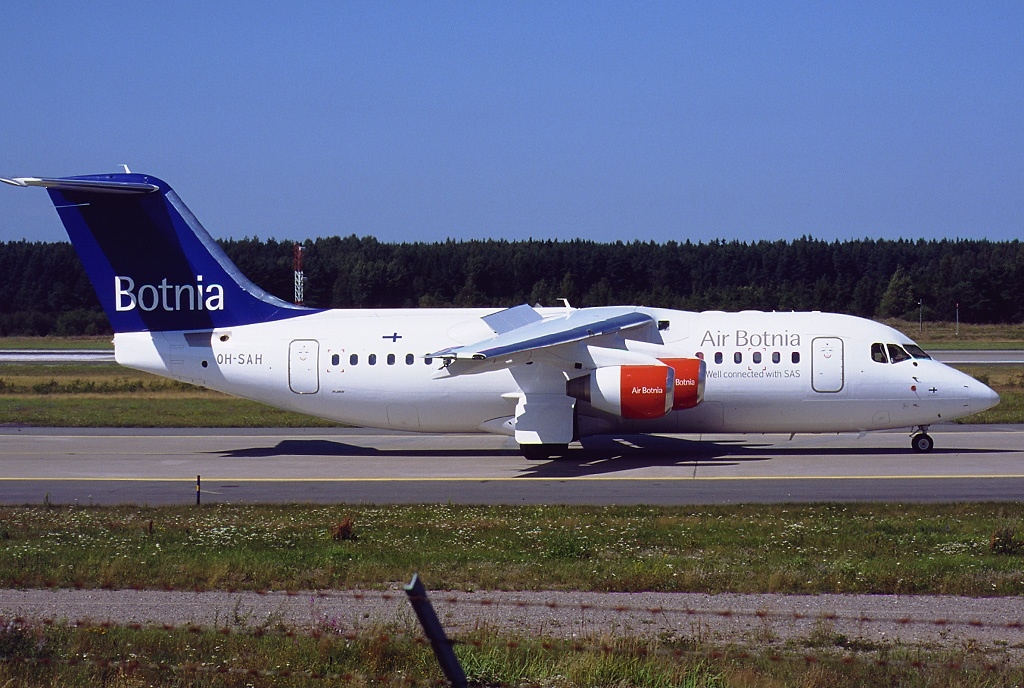
Avro RJ85

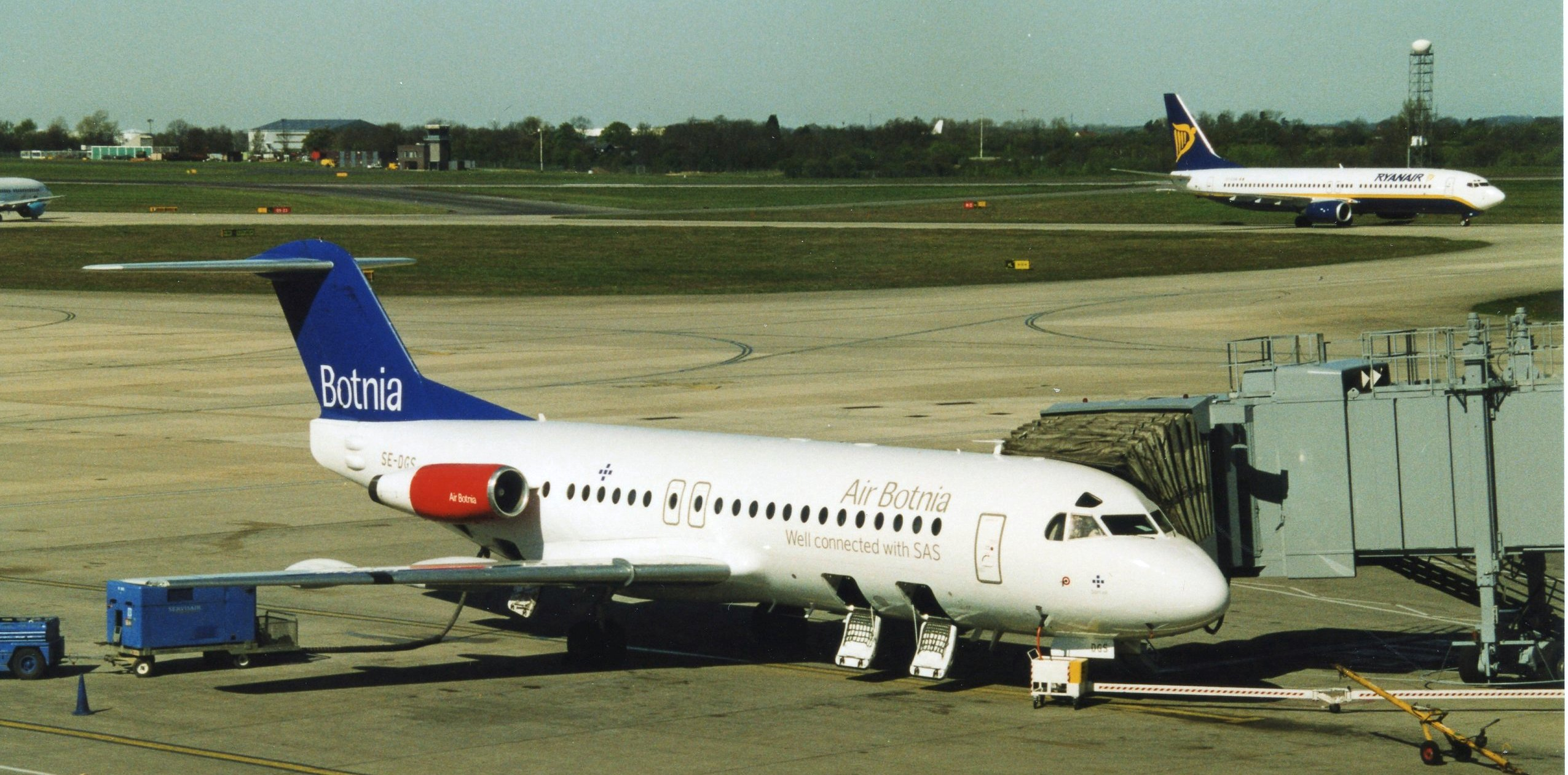
Fokker F28-4000

=== Blue1 gallery ===
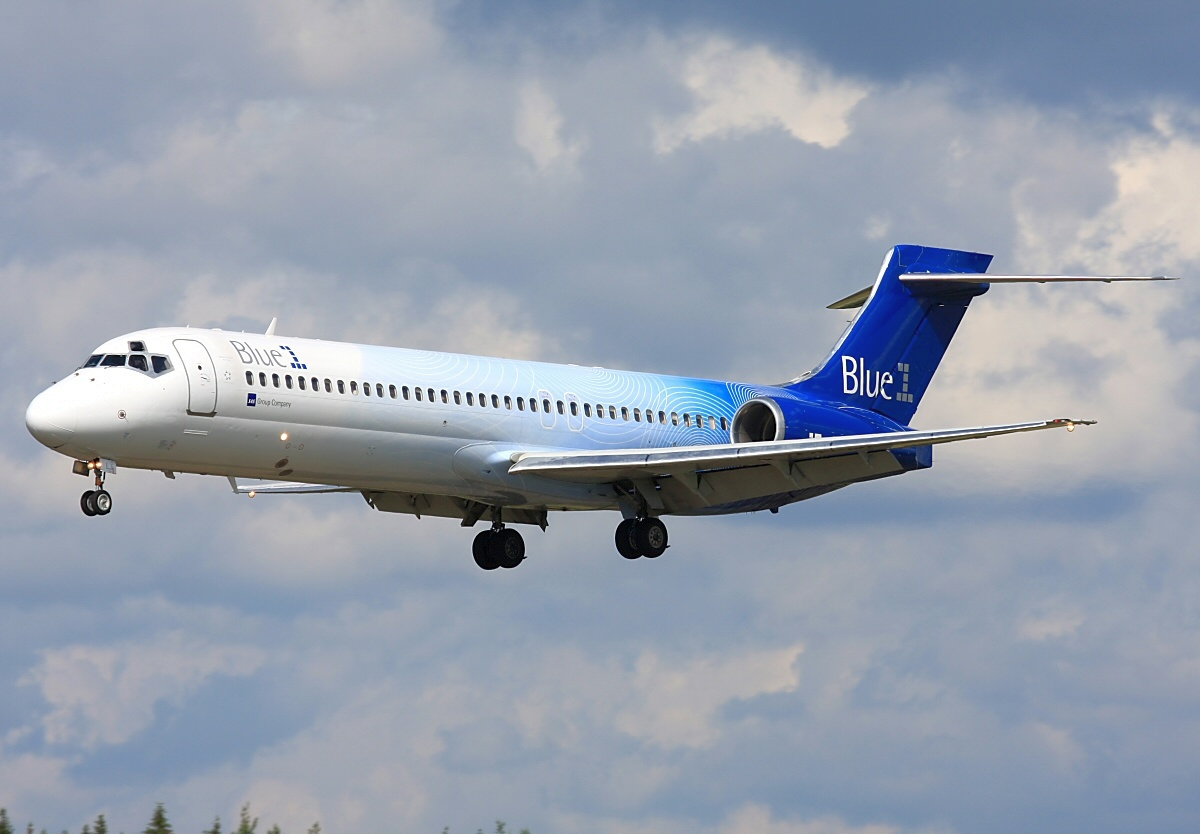
Boeing 717-200

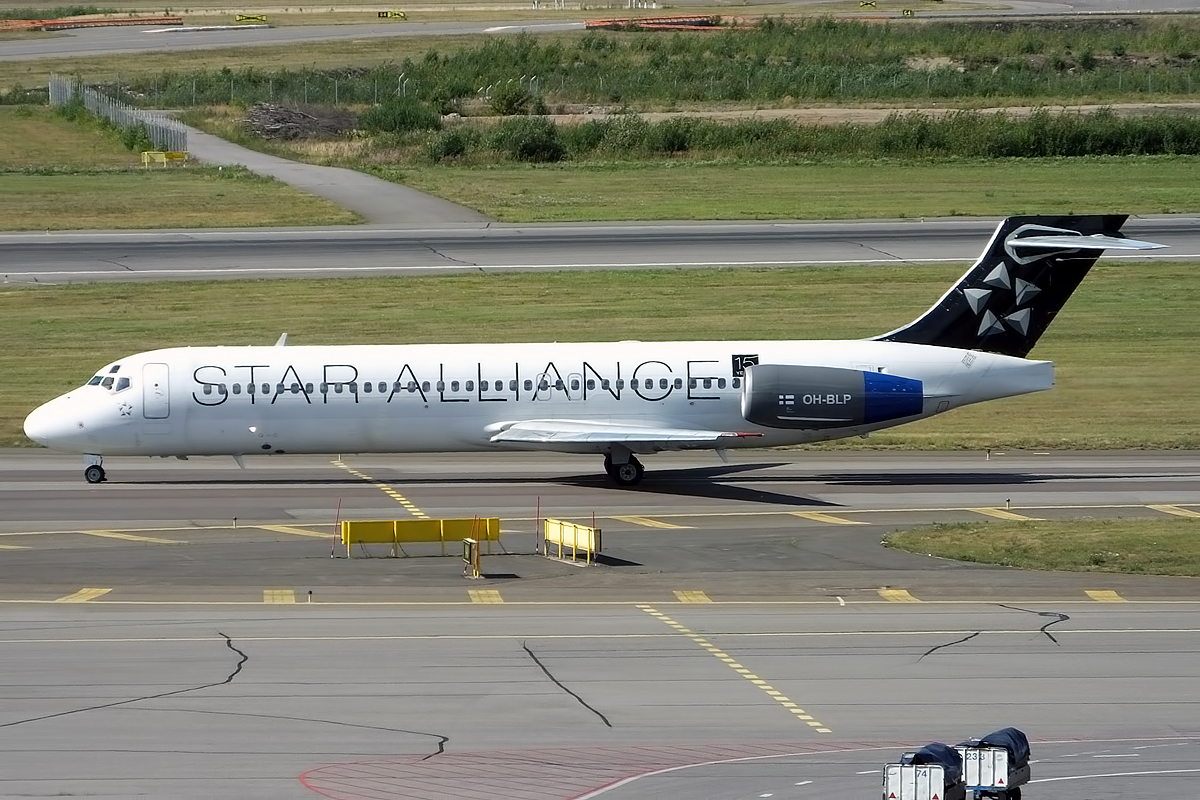
Boeing 717-200 in Star Alliance livery

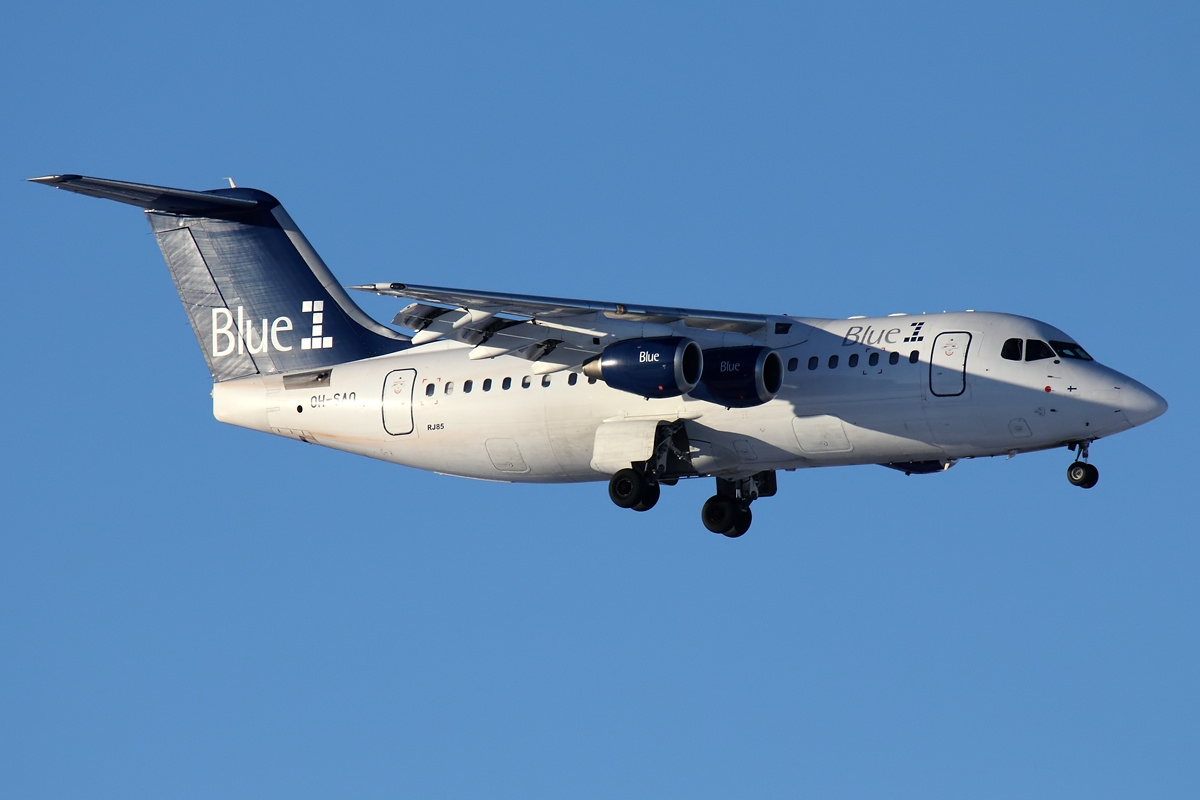
Avro RJ85

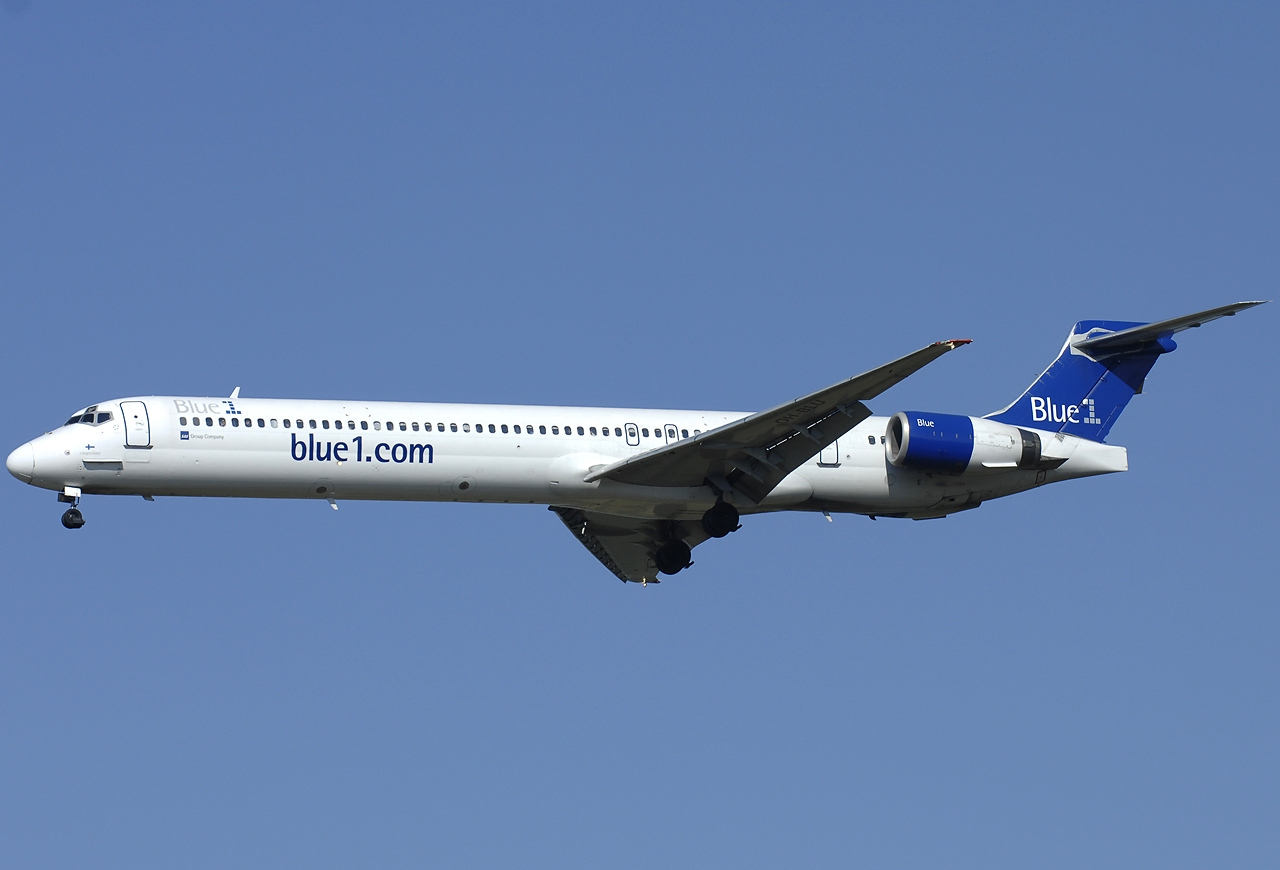
McDonnell Douglas MD-90

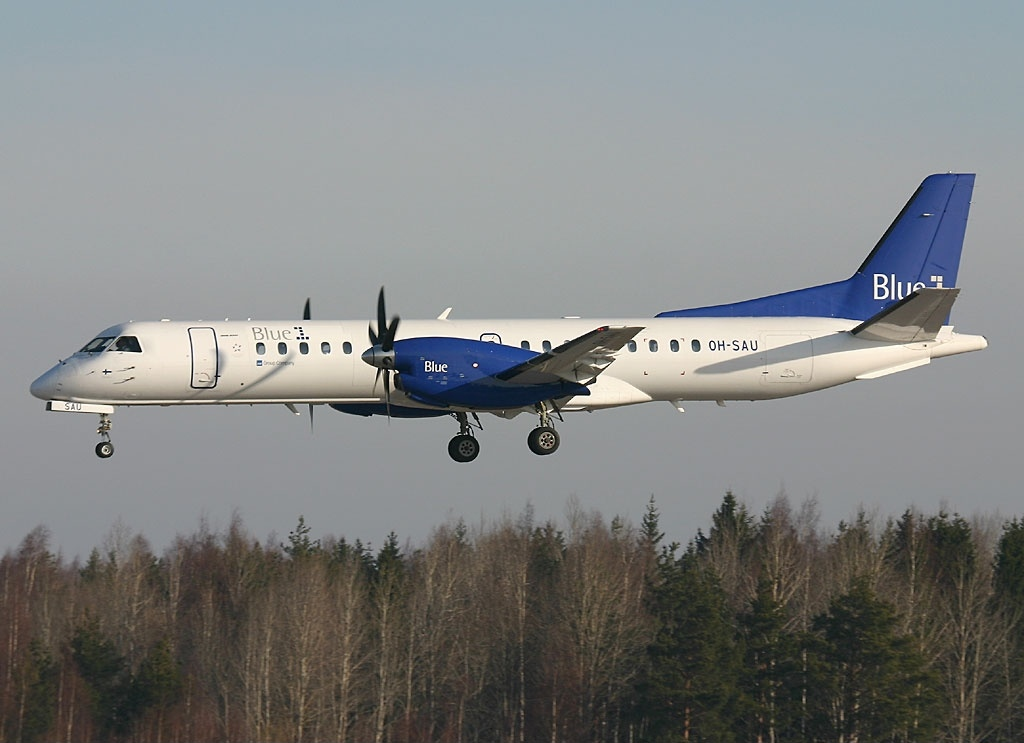
Saab 2000
