= Air Antwerp =

Regional airline of Belgium (2019–2021)

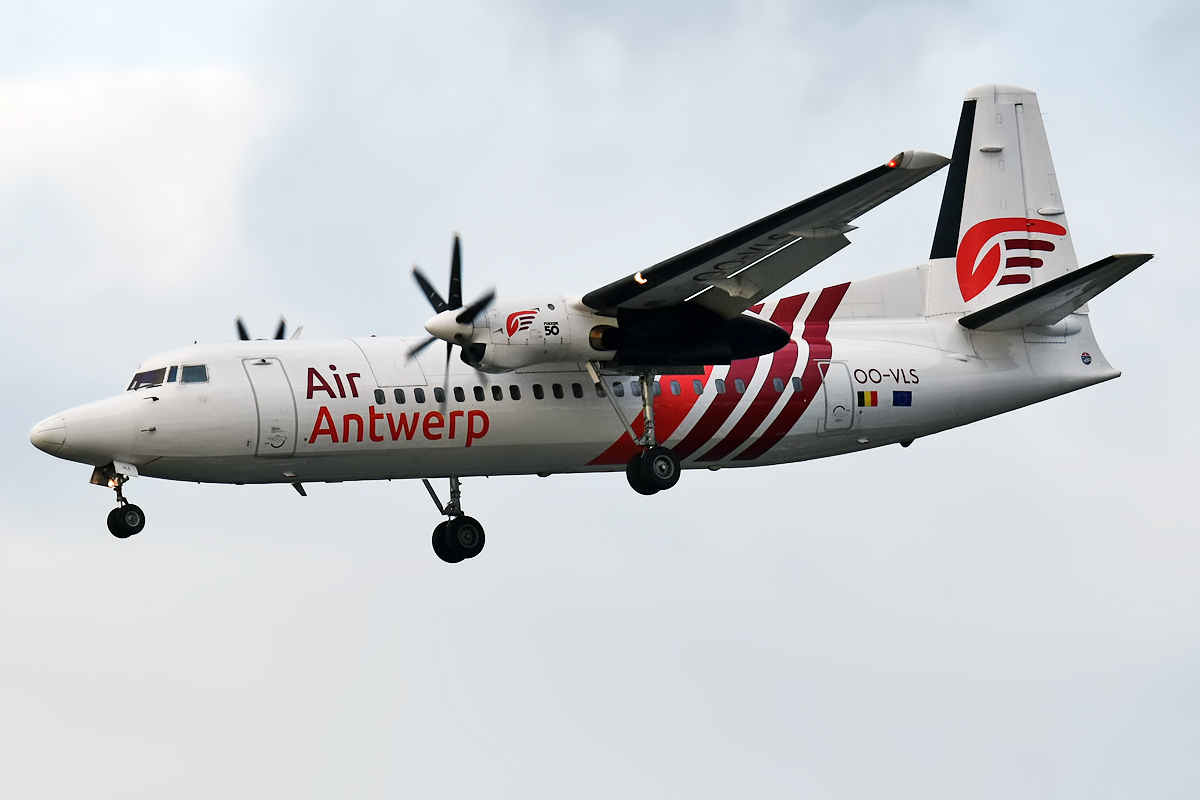
- Fokker 50
IATA	ICAO	Call sign
WP	ATW	DEVIL
- Founded: May 2019
- Commenced operations: 9 September 2019
- Ceased operations: 11 June 2021
- AOC #: 3061
- Hubs: Antwerp International Airport
- Fleet size: 1
- Destinations: 2
- Parent company: KLM
- Headquarters: Deurne, Antwerp Province, Belgium
- Key people: Johan Maertens (CEO)
- Website: www.airantwerp.com

Air Antwerp was a short-lived Belgian regional airline headquartered at Antwerp International Airport in Deurne.

== History ==
The application for an air operator's certificate for Air Antwerp was secured in 2019 by the Transport and Mobility department. On 9 August, Air Antwerp confirmed that the flight permit and operating permit had been received. It was owned by CityJet (75%) and KLM (25%).

The first flight operated on 9 September to London City Airport. A few former employees of VLM Airlines worked at Air Antwerp, helping with the preparatory work. The first aircraft, which was shown to the public on 27 July 2019, was previously part of the VLM Airlines fleet.

In October 2019, Air Antwerp joined the European Regions Airline Association.

In May 2021, CityJet handed all its shares to KLM. At the same time, Air Antwerp announced it would put its sole aircraft into storage with no plans to resume its scheduled route in the near future. In June 2021, Air Antwerp announced it would cease operations altogether.

== Destinations ==
Air Antwerp served the following destinations before suspending all services before the COVID-19 pandemic, and then finally ceasing operations.

Country	City	Airport	Notes	Refs
Belgium	Antwerp	Antwerp International Airport	Hub	
United Kingdom	London	London City Airport		

=== Codeshare agreements ===
Air Antwerp had a codeshare agreement with KLM.

== Fleet ==
As of August 2019, Air Antwerp operated the following aircraft:

Air Antwerp fleet
Aircraft	In service	Orders	Passengers	Notes
Fokker 50	1	—	50	
Total	1	—		
