= Cimber =

Cimber may refer to:

- Lucius Tillius Cimber (fl. 44 BC), ancient Roman governor, one of the assassins of Julius Caesar
- Cimber Sterling, Danish airline
- Cimber (airline), Danish airline, established in 2012
- Adam Cimber (born 1990), American professional baseball player
- Matt Cimber (born 1936), movie director
