= CityJet =

Irish and Danish wet leasing air operator

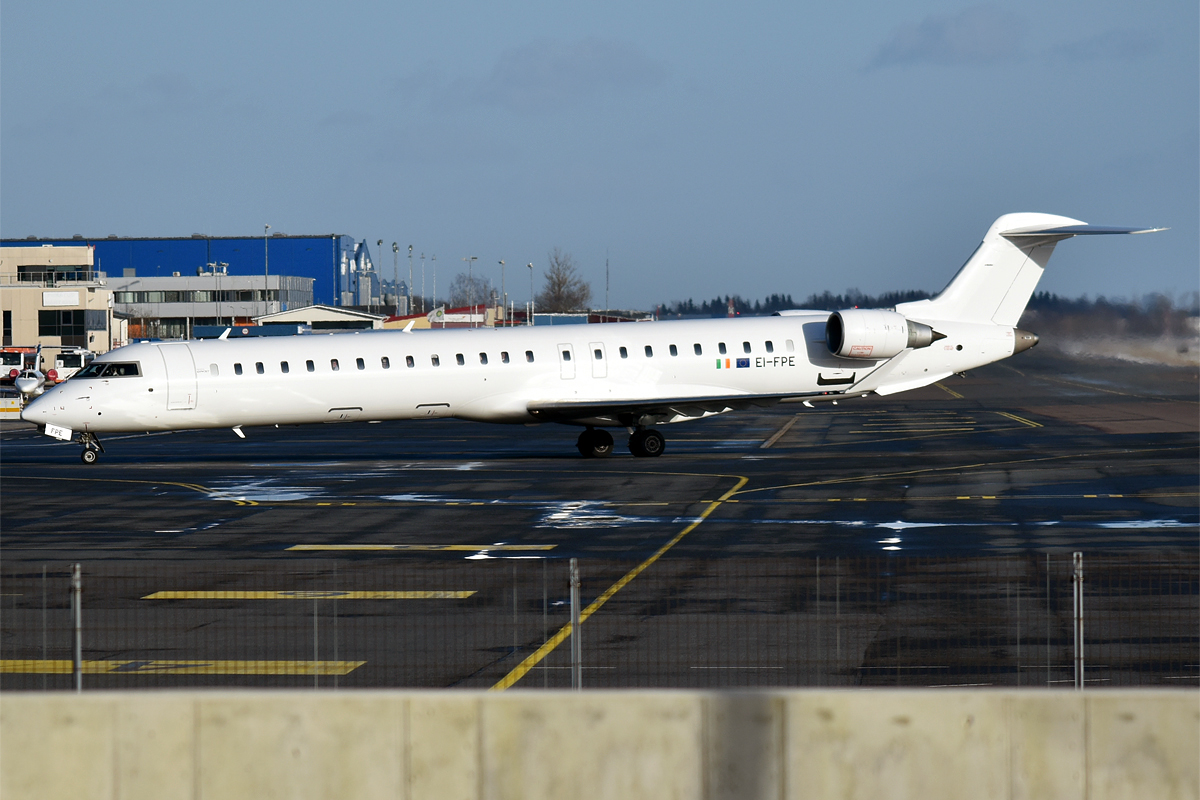
- CityJet CRJ900LR with Irish registration
IATA	ICAO	Call sign
WX	BCY	CITY-IRELAND
- Founded: 1992; 34 years ago (as Business City Direct)
- Commenced operations: 1994; 32 years ago
- Hubs: Copenhagen; Stockholm–Arlanda
- Fleet size: 18
- Parent company: JT3H (92%), Exchange Income Corporation (8%)
- Headquarters: Dublin Airport, Ireland
- Key people: Pat Byrne (Executive chairman & CEO); Hugh Rodgers (CFO); Eugene Quigley (COO); Cathal O'Connell (CCO)
- Employees: 600 (2023)
- Website: www.cityjet.com

CityJet is an Irish regional airline with headquarters at Dublin Airport. It was founded in 1992 and has gone through a series of corporate structures.

The airline was sold to Air France in 2000 and then by Air France to Intro Aviation in May 2014; in March 2016, the airline was bought by founder Pat Byrne and other investors. CityJet ended its own-brand scheduled services in 2018 and is now a major provider of wet leasing to European airlines. Prior to the merger, in summer 2023, CityJet was operating wet lease services on behalf of Brussels Airlines, Lufthansa and Scandinavian Airlines.

Over 450 of CityJet's 600+ staff are employed in Copenhagen in both flying and ground roles, making CityJet one of the most significant airline employers in Denmark, with further crew employed in Sweden. In addition to its head office at Dublin Airport and crew planning centre in Luton, CityJet has a maintenance hangar and offices in Copenhagen Kastrup Airport.

== History ==
=== Early years ===
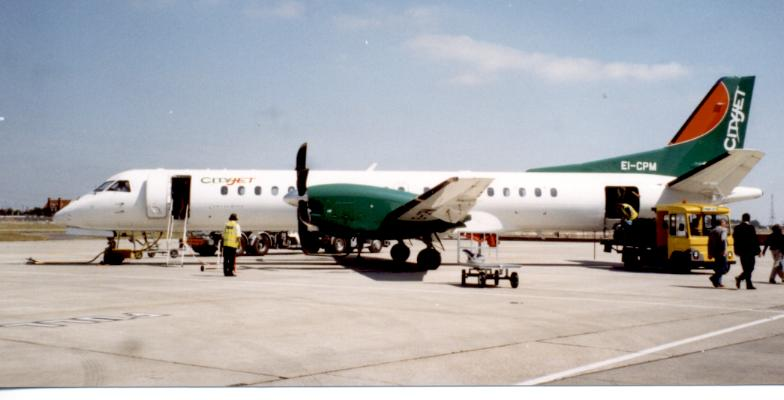
A CityJet Saab 2000 in 1998

CityJet was founded in 1992 as Business City Direct and commenced operations in December 1993. In January 1994 it started a single route between Dublin and London City Airport under a franchise agreement with Virgin Atlantic, in which it paid fees and charges to Virgin in order to operate as Virgin CityJet and use Virgin Atlantic's distribution channels. The airline was mainly competing with British Midland and Aer Lingus services from Dublin to London Heathrow and Ryanair services from Dublin to London Stansted. However, CityJet held a monopoly on services to London City until Aer Lingus launched services from Dublin to London City in September 1999.

In June 1995, Virgin CityJet debuted with flights between Dublin and Brussels, competing with Sabena and Aer Lingus initially.

In 1996, the airline terminated its franchise agreement with Virgin Atlantic on short notice and decided to continue operations using its own CityJet name from the end of July that year. By then, the airline flew scheduled flights from Dublin to London City, Brussels and Malaga. The decision to discontinue the Virgin Atlantic franchise came as Virgin itself entered the European short-haul market with budget carrier Virgin Express, and CityJet feared customers could confuse the low-cost carrier with its own full-service operation.

=== 1999-2014: Air France era ===
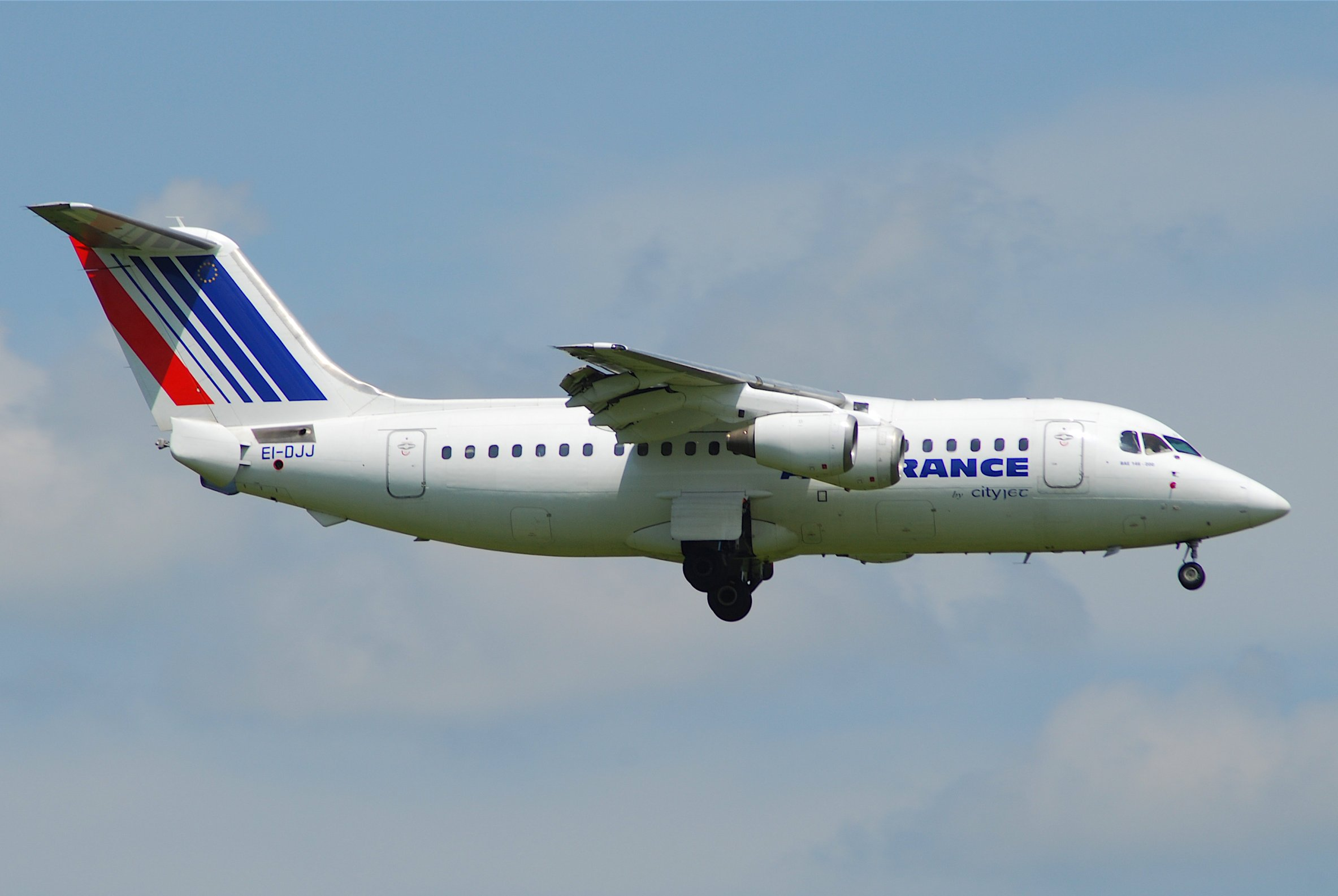
A CityJet BAe 146-200 operated on behalf of Air France in 2007

In 1999, CityJet was at the verge of bankruptcy. Air Foyle acquired half of the shares in the airline in return for assuming the carrier's debts. Air France took another 25 percent while investing £2 million. Under the new structure, CityJet retained its own scheduled services while also becoming Air France's principal European subcontract airline. However, CityJet still remained a loss-making business.

In early 2000, Air France took over all shares in CityJet and became its sole owner. At the time, CityJet already operated seven out of eight of its aircraft for Air France. The French national airline was allowed to outsource operations of aircraft with less than 100 seats to regional partners and subsidiaries under its contracts with Air France' labour unions; overall savings to Air France by outsourcing regional operations to the Irish subsidiary were estimated at 40 percent.

In 2006, CityJet operated supplemented Air France's operations with flights from Paris to Dublin, Birmingham, Edinburgh, London City, Florence, Gothenburg and Zurich. Furthermore, the airline still operated between London City and Dublin. The fleet consisted of 20 aged BAe 146 aircraft. From December 2006, the airline began replacing them with 23 much younger but similar Avro RJ85s it had acquired in a $221 million deal from Mesaba Airlines.

On 24 December 2007, Air France-KLM announced that it had signed an agreement for a full takeover of VLM Airlines NV from Panta Holdings, and announced on 28 May 2009 that VLM Airlines would gradually start to operate under the brand name CityJet. As of 1 June 2010, the whole VLM Airlines Fokker 50 fleet wore full CityJet livery, although VLM remained the owner of its own Airline Operators Certificate, and the Fokker 50 fleet was listed on the Belgian registry.

CityJet filed a pretax loss of €51.5 million for the year to the end of March 2010. This compared to a €53.9 million loss in the year to end of March 2009. Revenues fell by 8 percent from €282.4 million to €258.9 million over the same period. Passenger numbers grew, climbing by 6.5 percent to 2.1 million, while average fares dropped by 16 percent. Christine Ourmières joined as new chief executive on 1 October 2010. She had previously held a number of senior posts within the Air France-KLM group. In the IATA year ending 31 March 2010, CityJet carried just over 1 million passengers on its London City network.

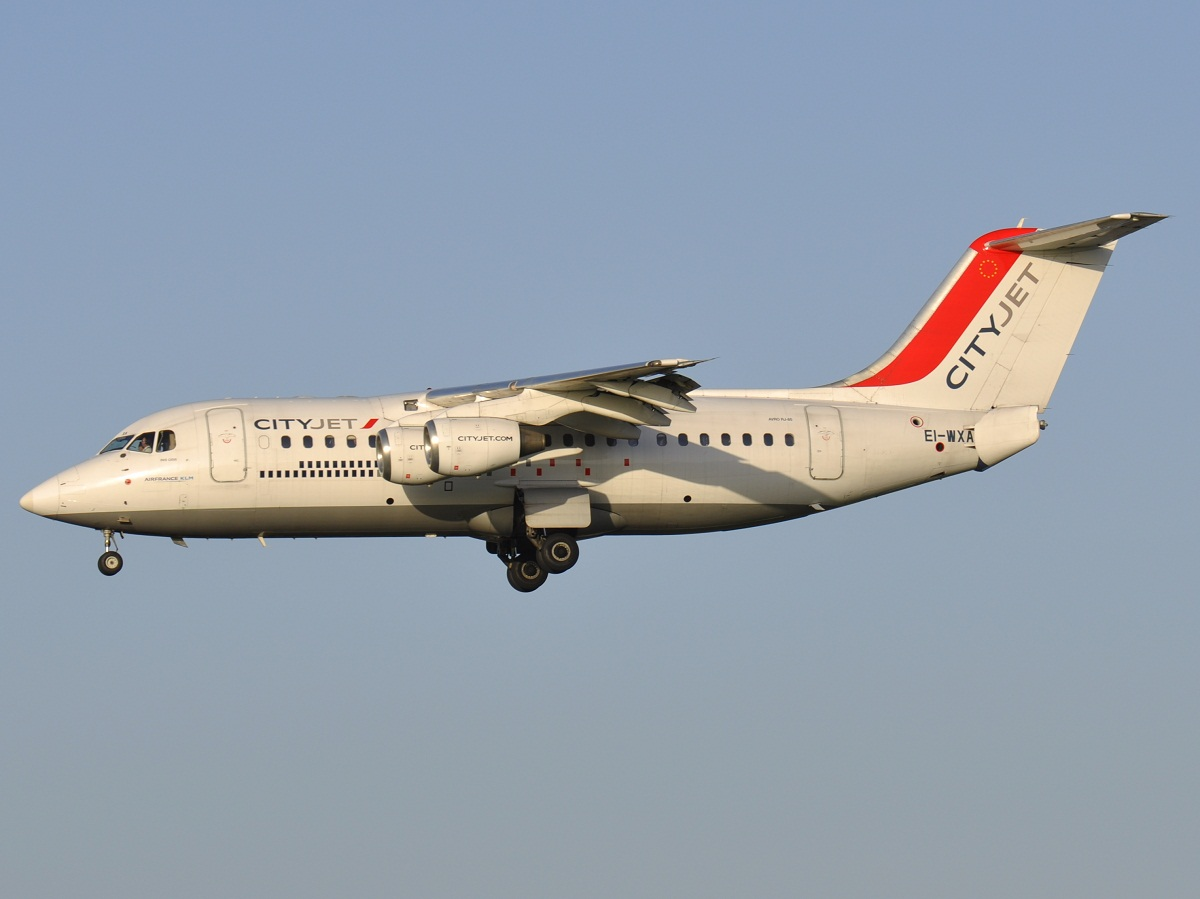
A former CityJet Avro RJ85

In June 2012, it was announced that Air France-KLM was considering selling CityJet to support its own ailing business, with a further statement in April 2013 that the winning bidder would be announced in the summer of 2013.

As of October 2013, the operational agreement with Air France had been replaced by codesharing, with most routes operated under its own WX code instead of Air France's. In December 2013, Air France announced it would sell CityJet, including VLM Airlines, to German investor Intro Aviation. The transfer was completed in May 2014. CityJet subsidiary VLM Airlines was bought by its own management and cut itself loose from CityJet. However, they were to remain flying the London City to Antwerp route as an ACMI operator for CityJet until mid 2016.

=== 2015-2018: Transition to ACMI ===
In October 2015, Scandinavian Airlines (SAS) announced it would sell its Finnish subsidiary Blue1 to CityJet and that CityJet would provide wet lease services to SAS from March 2016, with CityJet placing an order for up to 14 new Bombardier CRJ900 jets, 8 firm and six options. Four of the options were later confirmed. In 2016, Blue1 was dissolved and merged into its parent CityJet.

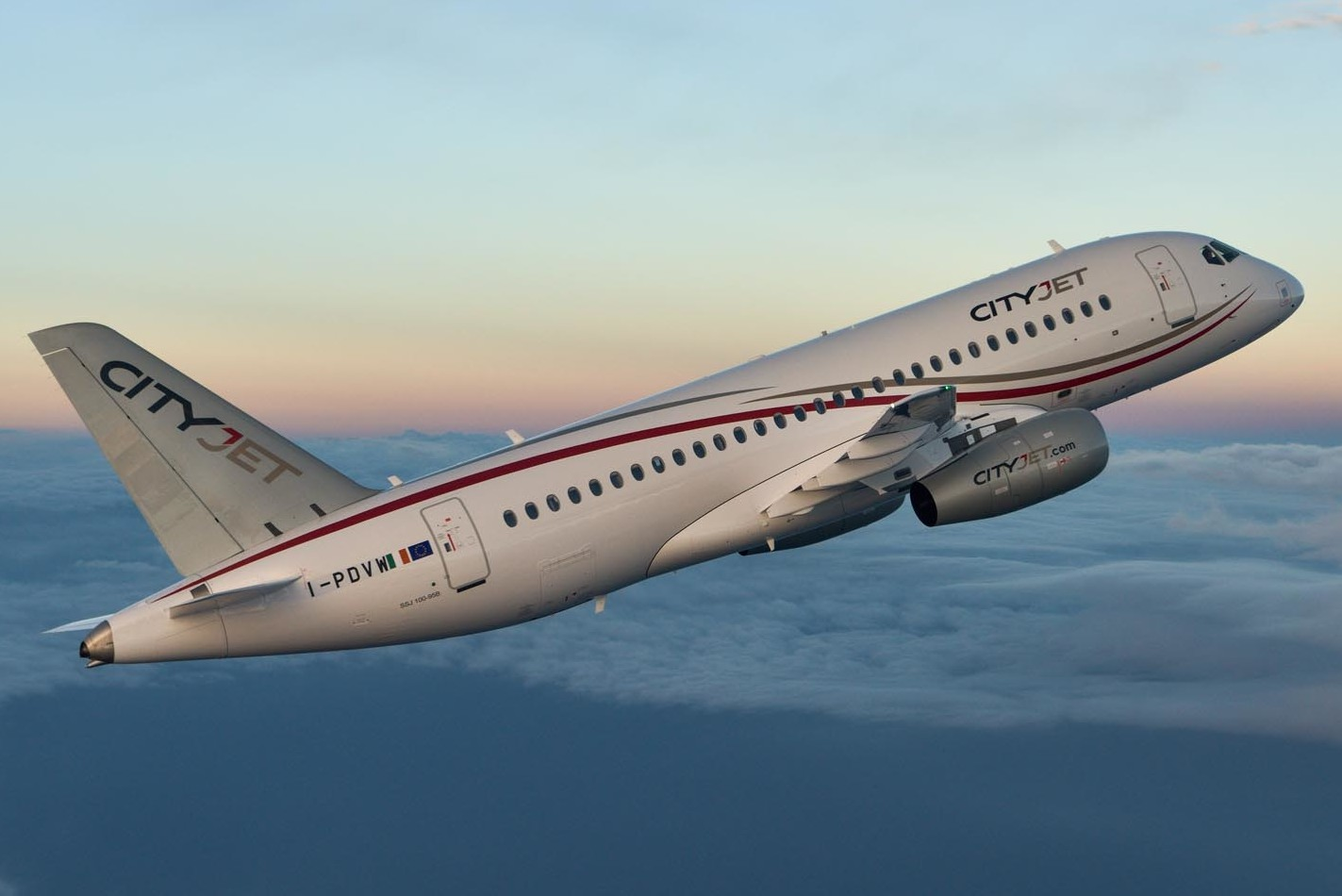
A former CityJet Sukhoi Superjet 100 operated for Brussels Airlines

On 28 June 2016, CityJet inaugurated its Sukhoi Superjet 100 revenue services with its first scheduled flight from Cork to Nantes. CityJet commenced a wet lease contract with Brussels Airlines using the Superjet in March 2017.

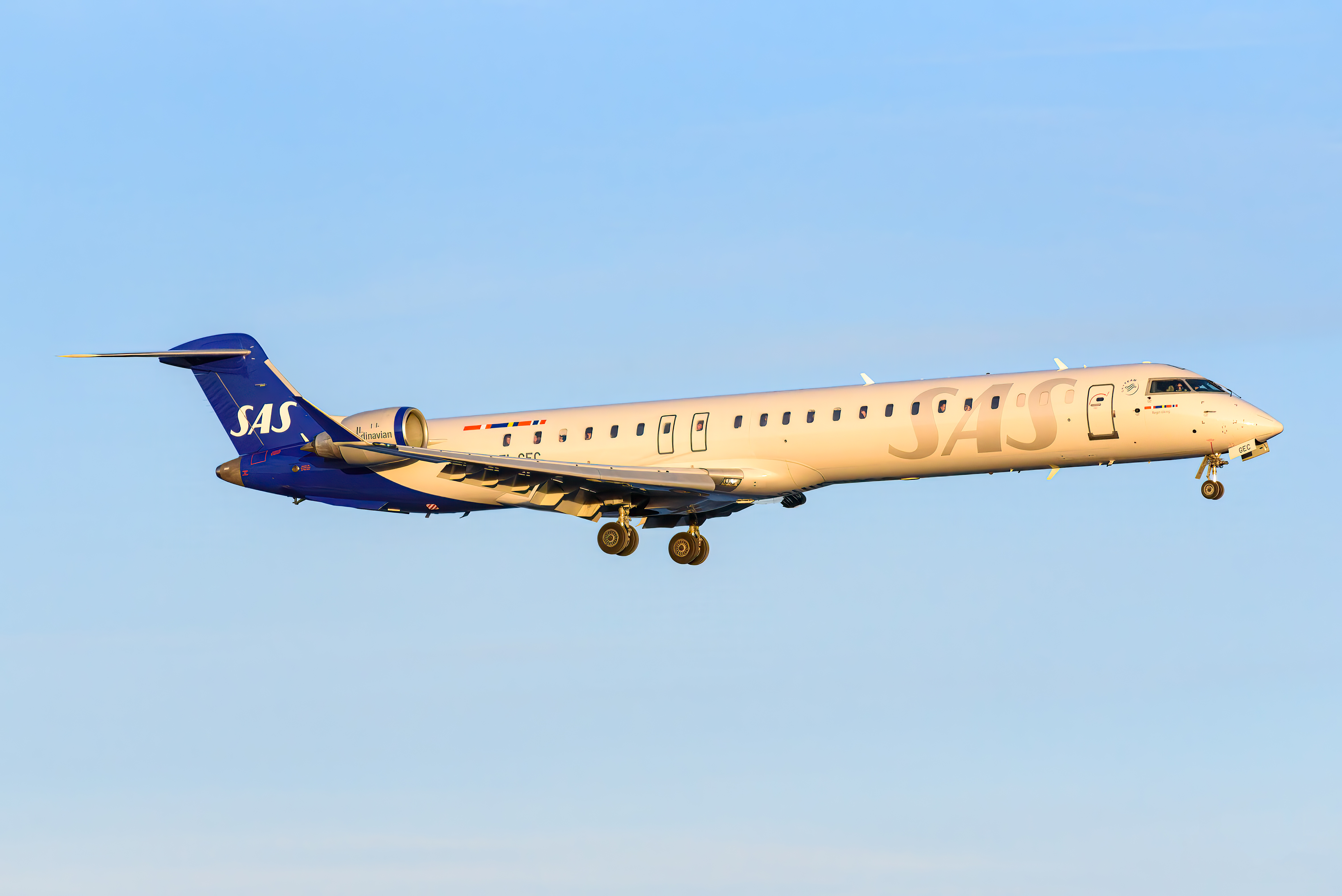
CityJet CRJ900LR operating for Scandinavian Airlines

In January 2017, CityJet agreed to buy Cimber, which had a fleet of 11 CRJ900s, from SAS. In addition to the acquisition of Cimber, CityJet secured a long term wet lease contract with SAS and placed an order leading to a further ten CRJ900 jets to replace those operated by Cimber, bringing it to a total of 22 new CRJ900 aircraft operating in total for SAS.

In March 2017, CityJet stated that it planned to focus more on its wetlease business while reducing its own scheduled flights. This led to the closure of routes from London City to Nantes and Paris as well as a downgrade of frequencies on other routes. CityJet then planned to operate 80 percent of all flights on a wetlease basis. On 5 April 2017, it was announced that KLM Cityhopper would wet lease two Avro RJ85s from CityJet to operate four additional Amsterdam–London City services per weekday over the Summer 2017 season, starting 15 May 2017. In late October 2017, CityJet cancelled most of its remaining routes from London City Airport, leaving Dublin as its only scheduled destination from there after operating a much larger network in previous years.

In July 2018, it was announced that CityJet and Air Nostrum would merge. This merger received European Union approval in 2019 but was deferred during the COVID-19 pandemic before being reactivated in 2022, with the deal completed in 2023.

In late August 2018, CityJet announced they would cease operating scheduled services under their own brand, effective from 27 October 2018, but continue business as an ACMI leasing provider.

=== 2018-present: ACMI ===
At the end of October 2018, CityJet commenced a wet lease agreement with Aer Lingus, operating two Avro RJ85 aircraft primarily on the Dublin to London City route.

In 2019, CityJet pulled all Sukhoi Superjet 100 aircraft from service due to insufficient operational reliability and returned them to their lessor, replacing these aircraft with CRJ900 jets on the wet lease contract with Brussels Airlines.

In 2019, CityJet partnered with KLM to create Air Antwerp, a new airline based in Antwerp International Airport. It operated daily flights to London City Airport from 9 September 2019. In May 2021 CityJet handed its 75% share of Air Antwerp over to co-owner KLM but the airline ceased operations in June 2021.

In April 2020, Brussels Airlines cancelled its wetlease contract with CityJet for five aircraft in the wake of the COVID-19 pandemic. The Aer Lingus wet lease agreement also ended at this time due to market uncertainty. In the same month the High Court appointed an interim examiner to CityJet. CityJet exited the Examinership process in August 2020 after financial restructuring.

After a brief pause at the start of the Covid pandemic, CityJet recommenced wet lease services on behalf of Scandinavian Airlines in June 2020 and progressively built up to the operation of 18 CRJ900 for SAS by 2022.

In March 2023, CityJet took delivery of the first of five Bombardier CRJ1000 100-seat regional jets to supplement its fleet of 21 CRJ900s, with the first two flying on a wet lease contract with Lufthansa. A new wet lease contract with Brussels Airlines commenced in March 2023 for the upcoming 2023 summer season using two CRJ900 jets.

CityJet merged with Air Nostrum in October 2023, and held a 20% interest in the new entity created from the merger, Strategic Alliance of Regional Airlines (SARA).

In March 2024, Lufthansa wet-leased 5 Bombardier CRJ1000s from CityJet until the end of October for the upcoming 2024 summer season.

In 2025, 92% of the airline was hostilely acquired once again by Danish investor and owner of Jettime Lars Thuesen as part of court sanctioned compulsory purchase as part of restructuring plan. Both airlines are intended to operate independently from one another.

== Codeshare agreements ==
- Scandinavian Airlines

== Interline agreements ==
- Singapore Airlines

== Fleet ==
=== Current fleet ===
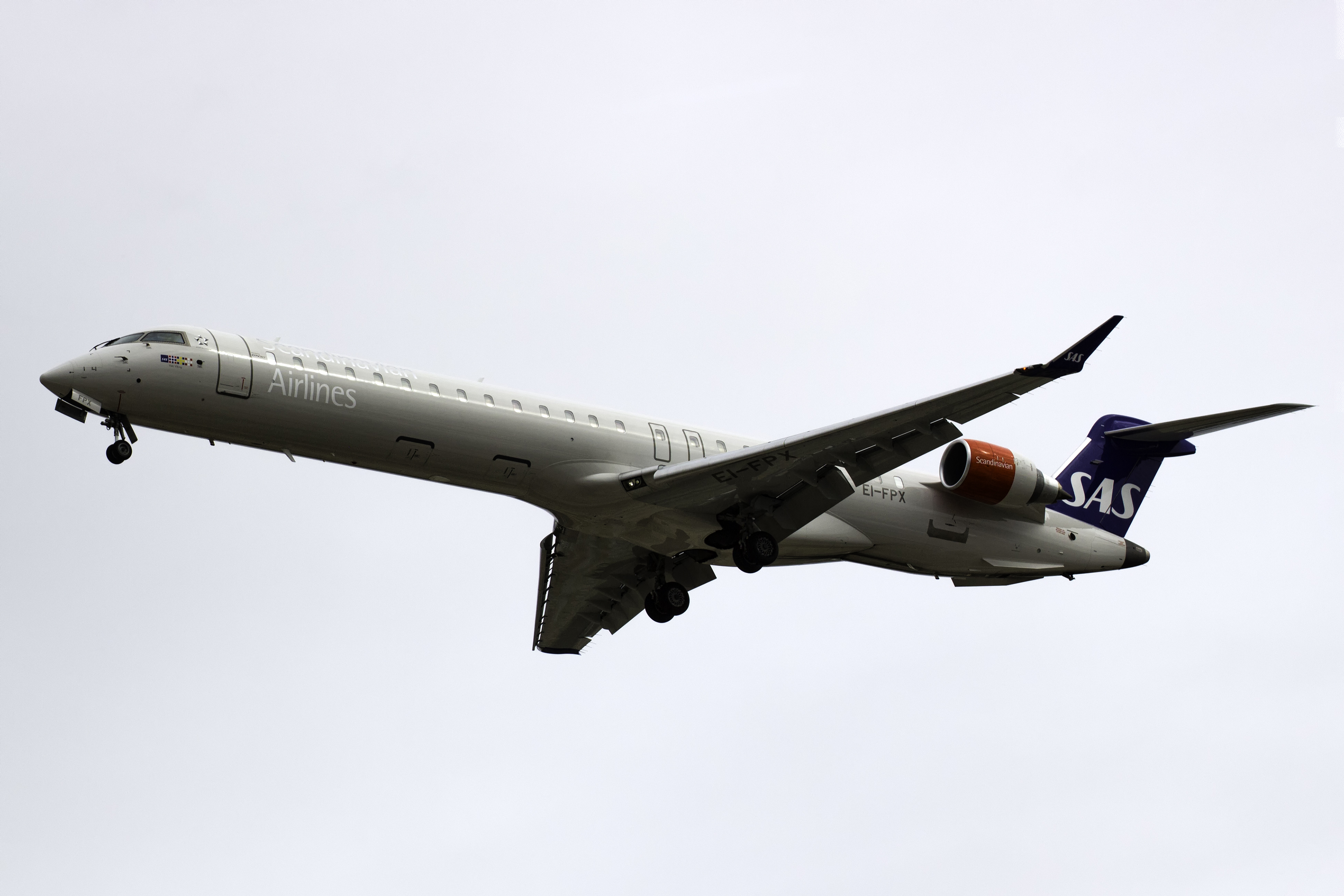
CityJet Bombardier CRJ900 operated for Scandinavian Airlines

As of July 2026, CityJet operates the following aircraft:

CityJet fleet
Aircraft	In service	Orders	Passengers	Notes
Bombardier CRJ900	16	—	88	Operated for Scandinavian Airlines.
Bombardier CRJ900	16	—	90	Operated for Scandinavian Airlines.
Bombardier CRJ1000	2	—	100	
Total	18	—		

=== Former fleet ===
As of August 2025, CityJet operated 16 Bombardier CRJ900 and 5 Bombardier CRJ1000

The airline also previously operated BAE146/Avro RJ85, Fokker 50, Saab 2000, Dornier 328 and Sukhoi Superjet 100 aircraft.

== Sponsorships ==
CityJet was the "Official Airline" of Leinster Rugby, for about a decade, until the pandemic resulted in a 2020 examinership for CityJet.

== See also ==
- Transport in Ireland
