= Antwerp International Airport =

International airport serving Antwerp, Belgium

Antwerp International Airport Internationale Luchthaven Antwerpen
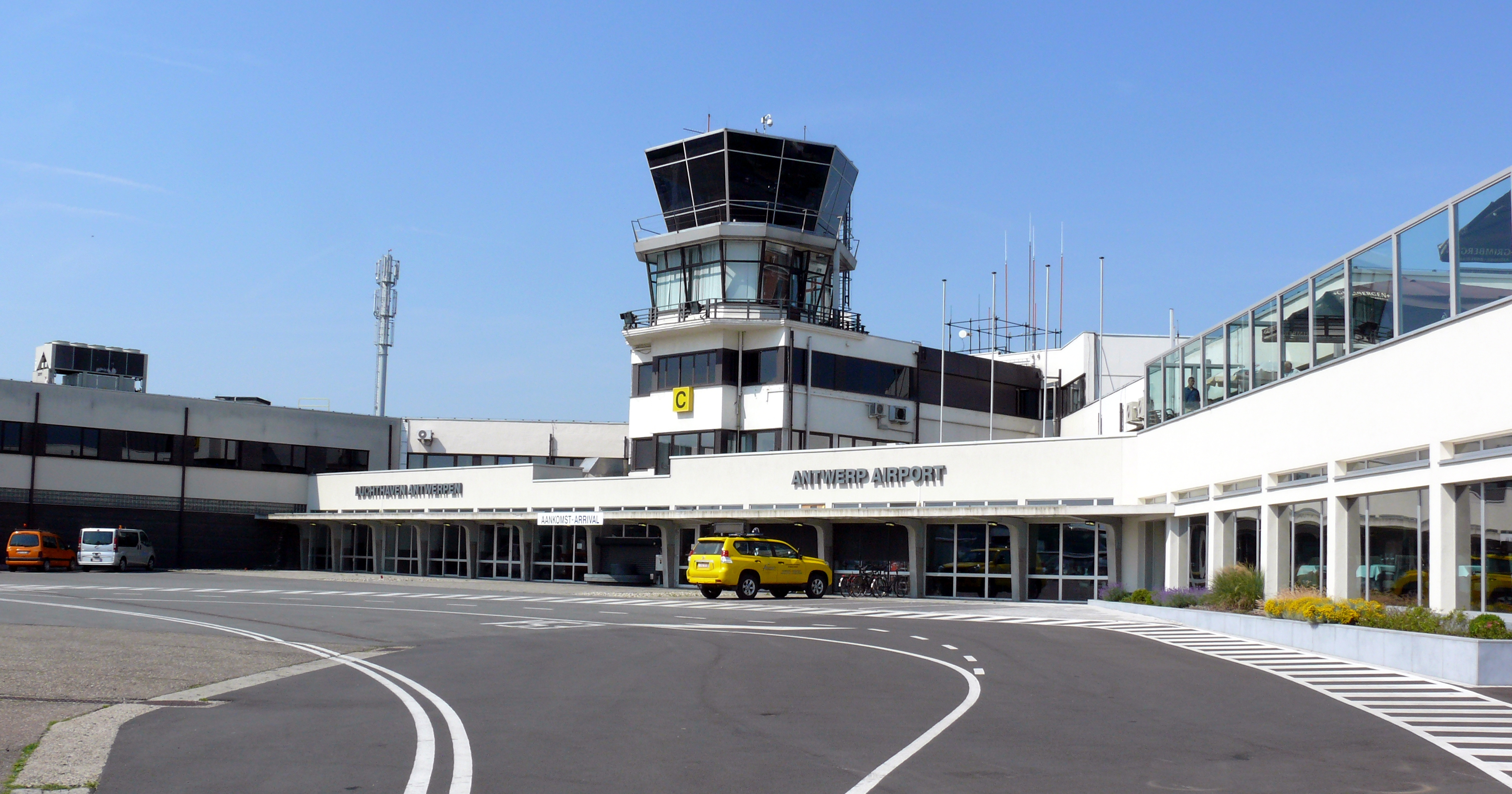
- IATA: ANR; ICAO: EBAW

Summary
- Airport type: Public
- Owner: Flemish Region
- Operator: Egis Group
- Serves: Antwerp
- Location: Deurne, Antwerp Province, Belgium
- Focus city for: TUI fly Belgium (closes 25 March 2027)
- Elevation AMSL: 32 ft (9.8 m)
- Coordinates: 51°11′22″N 004°27′37″E
- Website: antwerp-airport.be

Map
- Location of Antwerp International Airport

Runways
Direction	Length		Surface
Direction	m	ft	Surface
11/29	1,510	4,954	Asphalt
11/29	600	1,969	Grass
- Sources: Belgian AIP

Antwerp International Airport (Note: Dutch: Internationale Luchthaven Antwerpen; French: Aéroport International d'Anvers; German: Internationale Flughafen Antwerpen) (IATA: ANR, ICAO: EBAW), commonly known simply as Antwerp Airport, (Note: Dutch: Luchthaven Antwerpen; French: Aéroport d'Anvers; German: Flughafen Antwerpen) is a small international airport located 5 km (3 miles) south of Antwerp, Belgium. The airport is used for some scheduled and charter flights, as well as business and general aviation, and served 239,517 passengers in 2022.

== History ==
=== Early years ===
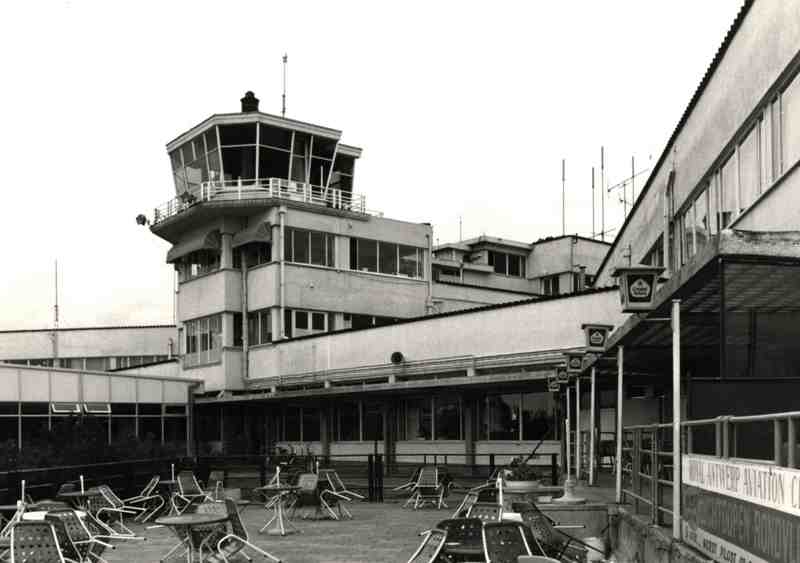
Antwerp Airport in 1976

After the first flying events at the Wilrijkse Plein, work on a proper airport for the city started in 1921, under the impulse of pioneer aviator Jan Olieslagers and others. The national airline Sabena operated passenger services from 1924 from an old railway carriage as the only passenger infrastructure. In 1929, the first stone of the project was laid by the Minister of Railway Transport, Maurice Lippens.

The airport was home to the aircraft factory Stampe et Vertongen until its demise after World War II.

During World War II, the airport was used by the Luftwaffe and also served the nearby Erla aircraft factory. After the German retreat in 1944, it saw brief use by Allied air forces, who called it Advanced Landing Ground B-70.

=== Development since 2000 ===
Antwerp Airport was home to VLM Airlines since the end of 2014, since independence from CityJet. VLM was offering flights from Antwerp to Hamburg and Friedrichshafen and was flying on behalf of CityJet on the route Antwerp – London City. However, the airline declared bankruptcy on 22 June 2016 due to cancellations of ACMI contracts by People's. Due to VLM's demise, their ACMI customer CityJet handed over the operations of VLM's former service from London City Airport to Antwerp to Danish Air Transport. The Antwerp to Hamburg service was taken over by Chalair Aviation but has been discontinued.

On 6 August 2018, the revived VLM Airlines announced the termination of five scheduled routes with another new one not commencing in the coming weeks and that instead it would focus on charter operations. On 31 August 2018 however, VLM Airlines announced the immediate stop of all of their operations from Antwerp.

After the demise of VLM, Air Antwerp was created. It announced a thrice-daily service to London City Airport from September 2019. However, in the wake of the COVID-19 pandemic, the airline announced the suspension of the route as of May 2021 before shutting down altogether in June 2021.

== Infrastructure ==
=== Facilities ===
The airport consists of one small passenger terminal with basic facilities including service desks, a small bar/coffee shop in the entrance hall and at the gate, and a bar/restaurant with a terrace. The apron features ten stands for smaller airliners such as the Fokker 50. As there are no jet bridges, walk-boarding is used. Due to its short runway length of only just over 1,500 m (4,900 ft), it is not possible to operate aircraft larger than the Boeing 757 at the airport.

=== Operator ===
The airport was operated by the Department of Mobility and Public Works of the Flemish Government which made an agreement with the French engineering group Egis Group to operate it for 25 years, starting in 2014.

=== Other uses ===
The airport is home to several flying schools, aircraft maintenance and repair workshops, operators of business jets, to several hangars for private aircraft, and to the Stampe en Vertongen Museum.

== Airlines and destinations ==
The following airlines operate regular scheduled and seasonal flights at Antwerp International Airport:

Airlines	Destinations
Sky Alps	Bolzano
TUI fly Belgium	Alicante, Málaga, Tenerife–South (all end 25 March 2027); Seasonal: Palma de Mallorca

The nearest larger international airports are Brussels Airport, approximately 40 km (25 mi) to the south, and Eindhoven Airport, approximately 80 km (50 mi) to the northeast.

== Statistics ==
Year	Passenger volume	Change over previous year	Aircraft operations	Change over previous year	Cargo (tonnes)	Change over previous year
2025	240,541	▲15.18%	32,930	▼0.15%	2,182.0	▲19.96%
2024	208,845	▼19.60%	32,979	▼11.86%	1819.0	▼18.93%
2023	259,764	▲8.45%	37,415	▼10.41%	2,243.7	▲11.97%
2022	239,517	▲63.09%	41,764	▼0.99%	2003.9	▲75.50%
2021	146,858	▲66.82%	42,182	▲63.97%	1,141.8	▲86.21%
2020	88,036	▼71.26%	25,725	▼29.27%	613.2	▼76.49%
2019	306,330	▲2.66%	36,372	▼7.80%	2608.0	▲6.10%
2018	298,403	▲9.23%	39,465	▲5.21%	2454.0	▲6.28%
2017	273,167	▼1.15%	37,509	▼9.40%	2202.6	▲1.04%
2016	276,311	▲24.95%	41,401	▼8.60%	2179.9	
2015	221,138	▲82.22%	45,296	▲3.58%	1543.7 / 3432.0 (Note: Different numbers were reported by FPS Mobility and Transport, and Antwerp Airport for cargo in 2015)	
2014	121,357	▼11.43%	43,732	▲0.86%	338.8	▼5.32%
2013	137,015	▼2.23%	43,361	▼7.67%	357.0	▼16.71%
2012	140,140	▼15.62%	46,962	▼10.89%	428.6	▲1.28%
2011	166,078	▲1.99%	52,701	▲1.93%	423.2	▲0.45%
2010	162,840	▼3.90%	51,703	▼14.21%	421.3	▼8.25%
2009	169,446	▼4.25%	60,266	▲7.48%	459.2	▼17.44%
2008	176,971	▲1.21%	56,072	▲8.69%	556.2	▲4.71%
2007	174,858	▲18.27%	51,589	▼6.24%	531.2	▼22.17%
2006	147,849	▲3.58%	55,023	▲0.28%	682.5	▲46.33%
2005	142,737	▼6.51%	54,871	▼5.61%	466.4	▲8.95%
2004	152,682	▼9.72%	58,132	▼9.61%	428.1	▼13.55%

Source numbers 2004-2014: Antwerp Airport ″Annual report 2014″

Sources numbers 2014–present: Federal Public Service Mobility and Transport: ″Airport statistics″ and Antwerp Airport.

== Ground transportation ==
Buses 51, 52 and 53 operated by De Lijn connect the airport with the Antwerpen-Berchem railway station which operates local, intercity and international trains.

== Accidents and incidents ==
- On September 8, 2022, a Cessna Citation business jet operated by GlobeAir overshot runway 11 while landing at Antwerp. Nobody onboard, including Dutch DJ Afrojack, was injured, and the aircraft reportedly did not sustain damage. As of September 2022, the incident is under investigation.

== See also ==
- Transport in Belgium
