= VLM Airlines Slovenia =

Slovenian sister airline of Belgian VLM Airlines

IATA	ICAO	Call sign
VO	WLM	RIBICA
- Founded: 2016
- Commenced operations: July 2017
- Ceased operations: 3 September 2018
- Operating bases: Maribor Edvard Rusjan Airport
- Fleet size: 3
- Destinations: 3
- Website: flyvlm.com

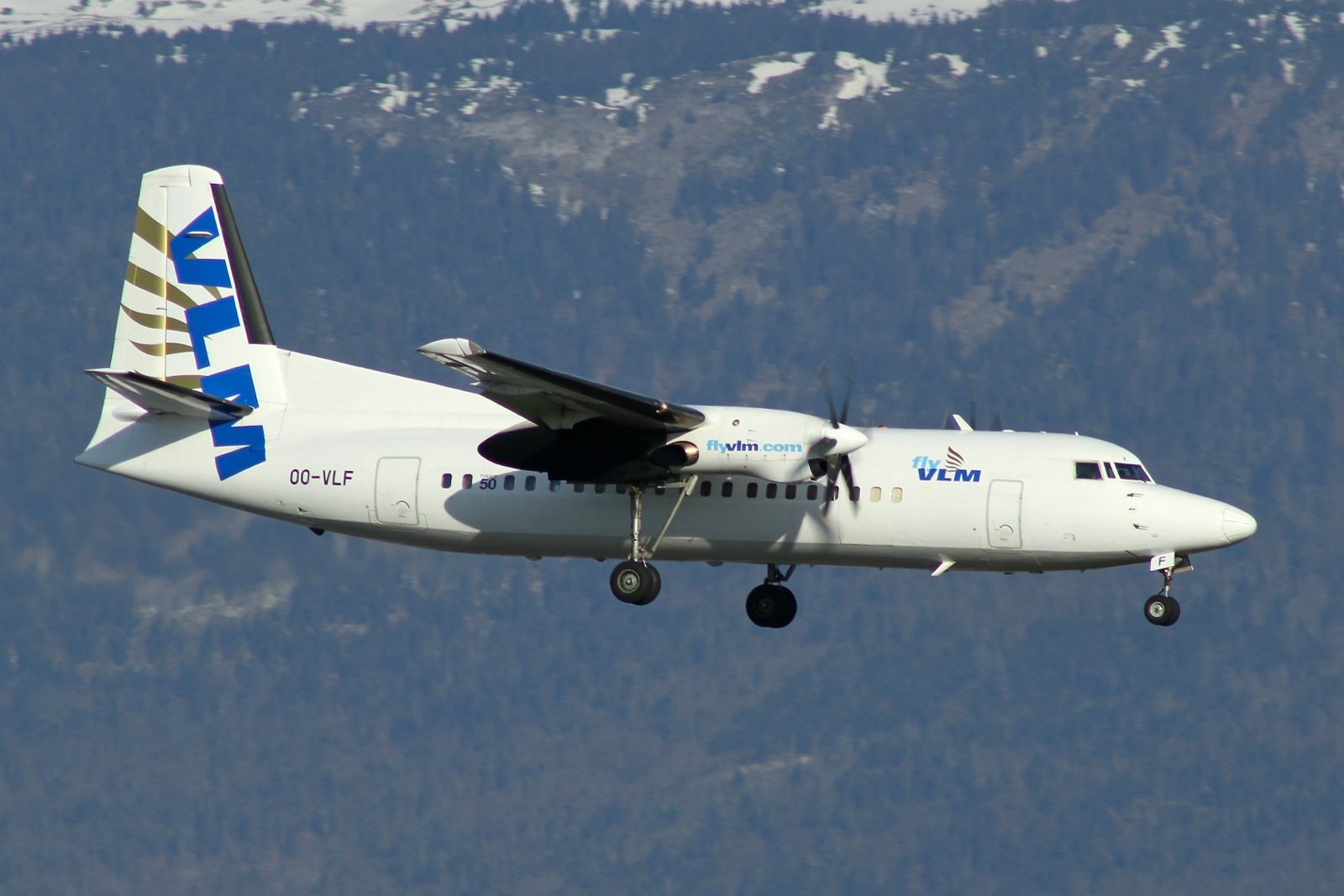
VLM Airlines Fokker 50

VLM Airlines Slovenia was a Slovenian airline based at Maribor Airport. The carrier was a subsidiary of SHS Aviation Slovenia, which is part of SHS Aviation.

== History ==
On 14 May 2017, it was announced that the airline had secured its Air Operator's Certificate (AOC) from the Slovenian Civil Aviation Agency allowing it to carry passengers and cargo. The airline ceased operations alongside its larger sister VLM Airlines in September 2018.

== Destinations ==
As of November 2017, the airline planned to operate scheduled flights between Maribor Edvard Rusjan Airport and both Belgrade and Zürich, and seasonally to both Dubrovnik and Split. However, as of August 2018, none of these routes are flown anymore, with the aircraft being used for charter flights, or have been used within the route network of its now defunct sister company VLM Airlines.

== Fleet ==
The VLM Airlines Slovenia fleet consisted of the following aircraft as of August 2018:

VLM Airlines Slovenia fleet
Aircraft	In service	Orders	Passengers	Notes
Fokker 50	3	—	50	
Total	3	—		

== See also ==
- VLM Airlines
