= Virginia L. Montgomery =

American visual artist

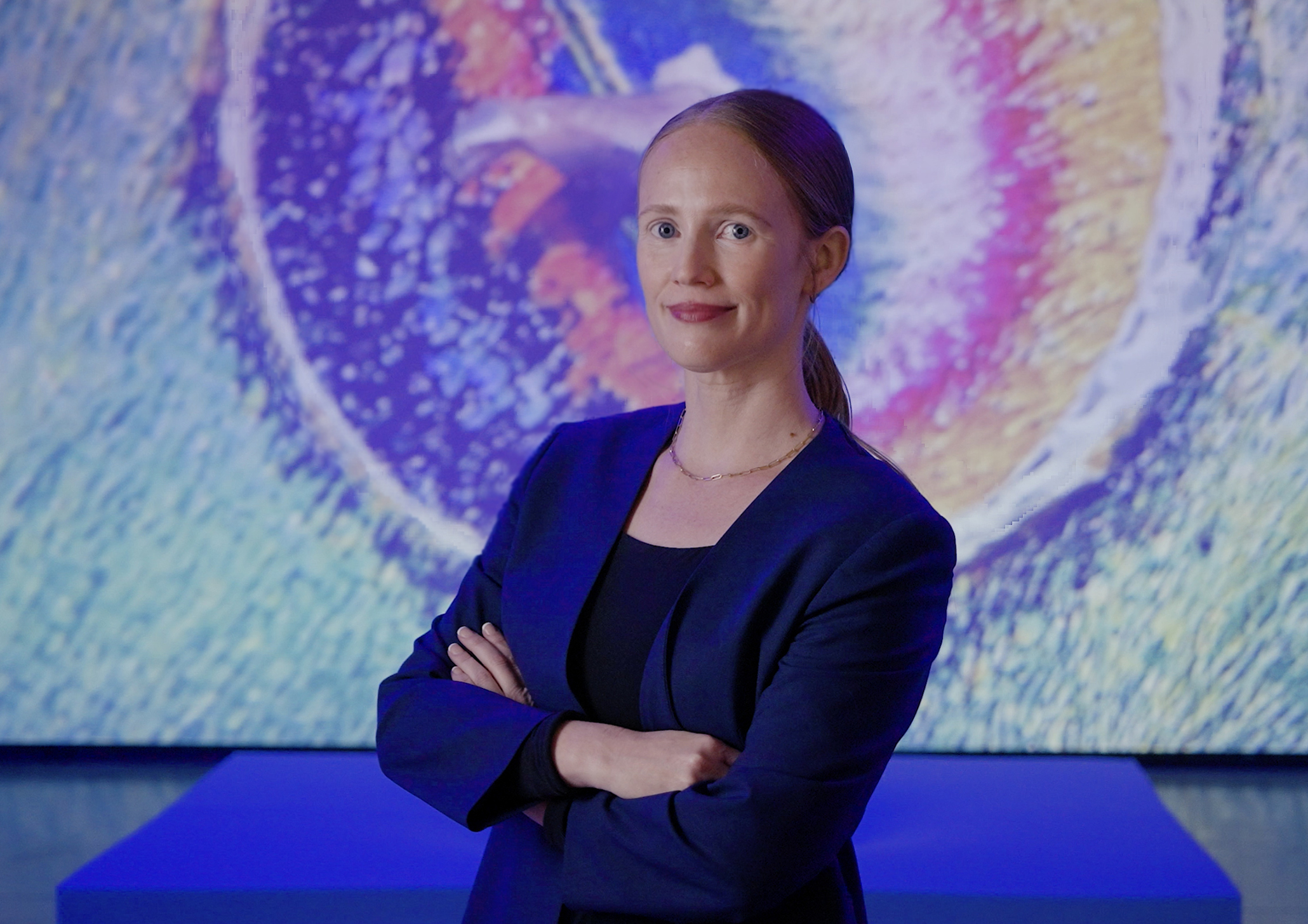
- Virginia L. Montgomery

Virginia L. Montgomery, also known as VLM, (born 1986) is an American multimedia artist working in video art, sound art, sculpture, performance, and illustration. She has exhibited extensively throughout the U.S. and Europe at museums, galleries, and film festivals. Her artwork is known for its surrealist qualities, material experimentation, and thematic blending of science, mysticism, and 21st-century neurodivergent, feminist autobiography. Montgomery is based between Houston and Austin, Texas.

== Early life and education ==
Montgomery is a neurodivergent individual raised in Houston, Texas. She attended the University of Texas at Austin, receiving her undergraduate BFA degree in 2008. She studied sculpture at Yale University, earning a MFA degree in 2016 and earning the Susan H. Whedon Award.

== Work ==
Montgomery is a multimedia artist whose work utilizes symbolic imagery like circles, holes, and spheres to facilitate unexpected and multi-layered insights about the natural world, philosophical metaphysics, and her own neurodivergent experience.

Montgomery describes herself as an artist who “thinks in symbols.” Recurrent motifs in her short, dreamlike videos include visual images such as dripping honey, emerging butterflies, and whirling drills, as set against her ASMR-like soundtracks of her recordings of Texas thunderstorms, wind chimes, and twinkling bells. In her art practice, Montgomery choreographs symbols and sounds in response to her hearing-motion condition of synesthesia. Her artworks invoke multifaceted associations. She describes being drawn to butterflies, for example, because of their historical association with rebirth, and because of their connection to the “butterfly effect," a mathematical theory that explores how small gestures in the natural world can unexpectedly generate big changes. Whether magnifying the eyespots of a butterfly, the eye of a storm, or the eye of the camera lens, her lexicon of circles, holes, and spheres offers portals into other ways of being and seeing, potential sites of transformation and healing.

Montgomery states in an interview with She/Folk magazine, "[Through my art] I can survey relationships between bodies, hierarchies between objects, genders, sound or forms, and thus allow forth a message to emerge from these intersecting realms of cognitive awareness and sensorial participation. In the exhibition catalog for Crash Test, Curator Nicolas Bourriaud writes, "...Montgomery's works display images atomized by technology: their aim is no longer to represent the world, but to find the points through which it manifests itself and operates, the source from which it draws its morphological power, in other words its capacity to generate forms and to produce effects." She has exhibited in art institutions including the Tate Modern New Museum, Socrates Sculpture Park, Center for Curatorial Studies, Bard College, Times Square Arts, SculptureCenter, Museum Folkwang, Kunsthal Charlottenborg, La Panacée Art Centre, Sweet Pass Sculpture Park, Blanton Museum of Art, Houston Botanic Garden, Lawndale Art Center., Ballroom Marfa, George Eastman Museum, Blaffer Art Museum, Aurora Picture Show., Cantor Arts Center, and Asia Society Museum.

Montgomery's permanent public art works on view include Portal – an outdoor steel sculpture memorializing Yale's decommissioned particle accelerator. Montgomery was commissioned by Yale University's Wright Lab to create Portal for permanent display at Wright Lab Arts in New Haven, Connecticut.

=== Video ===
Moon Moth Transcends Black Hole (2025)

Moon Moth Transcends Black Hole is a commissioned public video artwork on view from September 2025 - July 2026 at the Moody Arts Center in Houston, TX. Curator Frauke V. Josenhans writes: "The artist Virginia L. Montgomery (VLM) explores in her work the idea that consciousness is not unique to humans, and that all creatures and objects are sentient beings. Drawing from surrealism, mysticism, neuroscience, and physics, she combines aspects of these different fields in whimsical and introspective projects that encompass video installations, photography, sculpture, and performance. Through an eerie layering of close-up shots of the moths and mathematical black hole diagrams, Montgomery combines abstract concepts and macrocosm, the close study of moths, to create a bridge between scientific research and life forms, small and big.

Stargazer Luna Moth Seeks the Moon (2025)

Stargazer Luna Moth Seeks the Moon is a surreal, synesthesia-esque, short film about a Luna moth on her quest to meet the moon. Shot in high-definition macro footage by the artist Virginia L. Montgomery alongside her Luna moth collaborators, the film explores themes of metamorphosis and cosmic awe. The film collages together imagery of live Luna moths hatching from their cocoons amidst an ethereal video dreamworld of twinkling temple bells and punctuating mechanical drills. Collectively, these elements facilitate for audiences a moment of cosmic awe, where-in the film's sensorial qualities (color, sound, movement) all appear consciousness, interconnected, and alive.

Honey Moon in Blue (2025)

Honey Moon in Blue is a serene and sensorial short art-film about the uncanny flow of time. Coyly literal, the film depicts the artist's hand cradling a small model 3-D printed moon as real liquid honey sensually streams into a dark void beyond. Honey Moon in Blue was performed, produced, and edited by the artist. It was filmed by the artist in a single take within a miniature film-set. The work itself is surreal yet straightforward, documenting a real-time, solo performance with simple materials that encourage contemplation. Honey Moon in Blue, filmed in 2025 in 4k, was inspired by the artist's original film, Honey Moon, filmed in 2019 in HD, that was commissioned in 2019 by Midnight Moment | Times Square Arts for public display across 30+ digital billboards in New York City's Times Square.

Astrophotography Timelapses over the McDonald Observatory with Cosmic Honey Flows (2025)

"Astrophotography Timelapses" is an atmospheric, experimental art film that features astrophotography imagery taken onsite at the McDonald Observatory by multimedia artist, Virginia L. Montgomery, during her 2024 art residency at the Astronomer's Lodge. The film collages large-scale imagery of the cosmos together with macro-scale imagery of honey flowing across the screen to facilitate a moment of spacial awe. Astrophotography Timelapses" was created with support from Ballroom Marfa and the McDonald Observatory.

Vestal Virgin Vengeance (2024)

Vestal Virgin Vengeance is a surreal, symbolic, and sculptural art-film inspired by the film-theory idea of "the gaze," the Vestal Virgins, and the contentious state of women's healthcare in Texas today. The film was created in response to the tragic 2024 deaths of Texas women Josseli Barnica and Nevaeh Crain, who each died due Texas’s unjust abortion ban—a policy that prohibits Texas women from receiving life-saving healthcare amidst miscarriages. In her film, VLM facilitates a hands-on material inquiry into myth, destruction, and healing. Through a surrealist lens, Vestal Virgin Vengeance channels the protective powers of The Vestal Virgins, an all-women pagan cult active in 2nd century Rome, who were renowned for their mysterious rites, supernatural abilities, and commitment to sisterhood. The film, Vestal Virgin Vengeance, is an experimental, non-narrative live-action work. It was shot en plein aire on a miniature prop-set outfitted with cut-out imagery of the famed 19th c. sculpture of a veiled Vestal by Raffaelo Moniti, the artist's own Dewalt® power drill, and a gallon of honey. In the dream-logica structure of the film, the artist's Dewalt® power drill symbolizes the aggression of femme revolution, whereas the flows of sweet honey symbolize the critical need for healing, soothing, and care. The film's elemental soundscape features a unique sonic blend of Texas bird songs, weather systems, and mechanical power drills, to facilitate a synesthesiac experience. Collectively, Vestal Virgin Vengeance syncs together themes from feminism, metaphysics, and image theory, to channel the precarious "unreality" of living amidst this strange moment in time. Vestal Virgin Vengeance was directed, edited, produced, and performed by the artist. The soundscape is original and is the artist's own.

Moon Moth Bed (2023)

Moon Moth Bed is a surreal and symbolic experimental short film about destruction, rebirth, and metamorphosis. Inspired by Dr. Donna Haraway's ecofeminist writings, this live-action film collages together imagery of real Luna moths amidst an ethereal dreamworld. The film is cocooned within an atmospheric soundscape of rumbling thunderstorms, textured sounds, and twinkling temple bells. In Moon Moth Bed's culminating visual sequence, a deus-ex-machina device enters the film to conjure chaos. In response, the video dreamworld comes alive with sensual flows of honey to restore peace. The video concludes with circle-shaped imagery to symbolize rebirth and conjure hope. Moon Moth Bed was directed, edited, produced, sound-scored, and performed-by multimedia artist Virginia L. Montgomery alongside her Luna moth collaborators. Moon Moth Bed was commissioned by Women & Their Work Gallery (2024) for the artist's solo exhibition "Eye Moon Cocoon." Moon Moth Bed screened at The New Orleans Film Festival (2024) and The Front Fest (2024.)

==== Bella Luna (2023) ====
Bella Luna is an experimental art-film depicting a luna moth as it flies between sticks and bells to create a soundscape. In the film repeating circle-themed imagery appears like holes, spheres, eyes and the eye-spots on moth wings. Bella Luna was exhibited at Kling & Bang in Reykjavik, Iceland.

==== O Luna (2021) ====
O, Luna is a live-action video and sound artwork depicting the relationship between a luna moth and the artist, Virginia L. Montgomery. The film investigates ecofeminist themes of materiality, metamorphosis, and "atomic consciousness." O Luna references themes from mythology, feminist psychoanalysis, and material physics, such as the "Cosmic Egg" myth, the Grecian "Myth of Psyche," "the Gaze," and the "Coriolis Effect." O Luna features luna moths raised by the artist. The video was created, filmed, edited, and scored by Virginia L. Montgomery. O Luna was exhibited at the Tate Modern, The Contemporary Austin, and Aurora Picture Show.

==== Butterfly Birth Bed (2020) ====
Butterfly Birth Bed is an experimental video artwork inspired by 'The Butterfly Effect'—the philosophical theorem that any small change in our environment, even the gentle flapping of a butterfly's wings may manifest change. The film documents the emergence of live butterflies over miniature bed containing an image of a hurricane. The video was self-produced and sound-scored by Virginia L. Montgomery (VLM) after her experience enduring Hurricane Harvey. Butterfly Birth Bed was featured inside the Film and Video Gallery of the Blanton Museum, Austin, Texas for the exhibition Day Jobs curated by Veronica Roberts.

==== Sky Loop (2020) ====
The Sky Loop exhibition is a video art installation using a psychoanalytic perspective to explore the artist's firsthand experience of Hurricane Harvey in 2017. The installation interweaves video imagery of hurricanes and butterflies as inspired by the Butterfly Effect theory. The exhibition was commissioned by the Lawndale Art Center of Houston, Texas. Montgomery was interviewed by NPR correspondent Catherine Lu about the Sky Loop video exhibition on KUHT Houston Public Media, 88.7FM radio.

==== Pony Cocoon (2019) ====
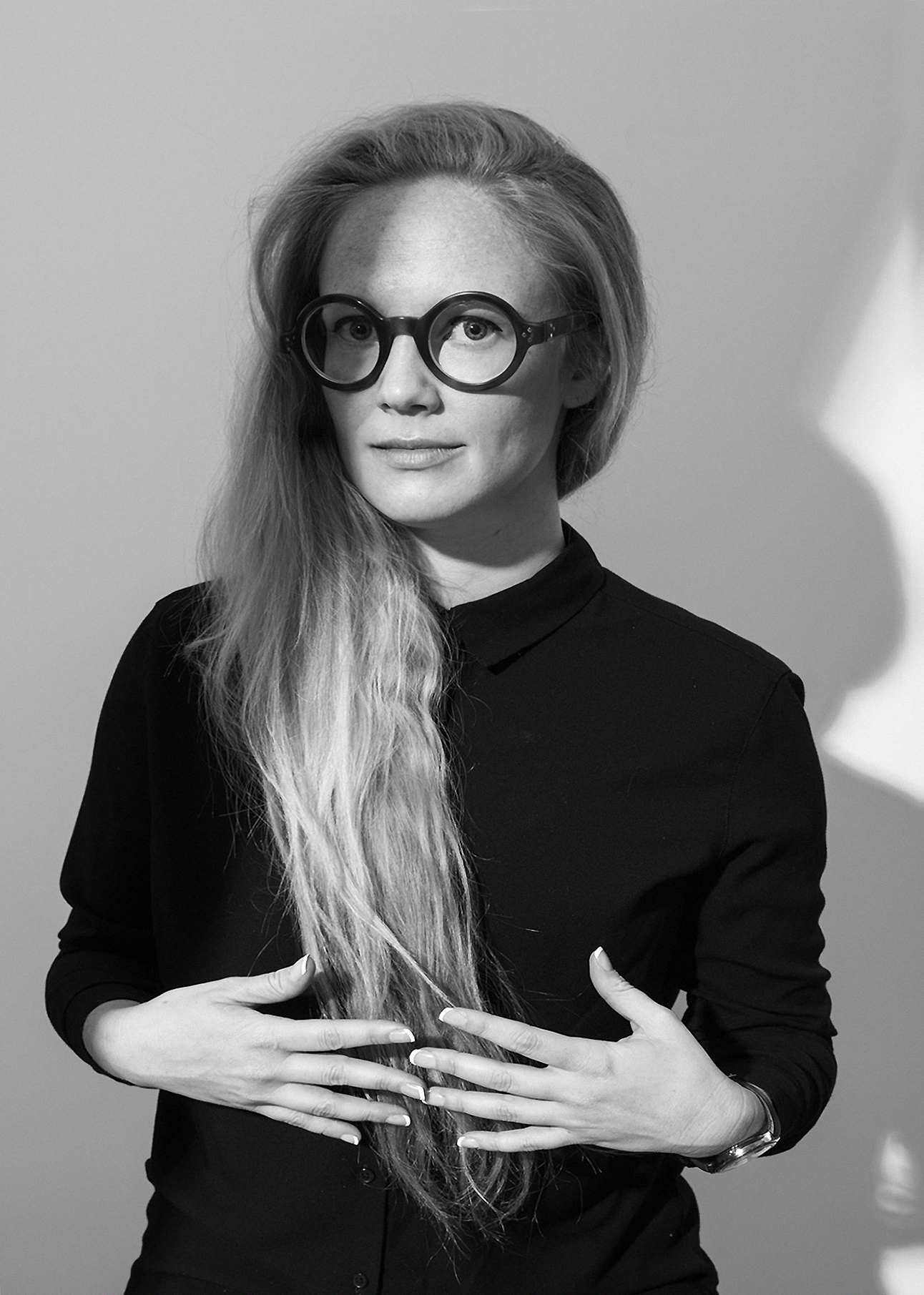
Virginia Montgomery

Pony Cocoon is a video artwork depicting a luna moth hatching from a blonde ponytail hair prop. The film conceptually interweaves themes of psychology and entomology. The Pony Cocoon video is recorded in high definition macro camera footage. The film's soundscape is original and constructed from field recordings by the artist. Pony Cocoon was exhibited at False Flag Gallery in 2019.

==== Honey Moon (2019) ====
Honey Moon is a public video artwork that was created for Times Square Arts in New York City. The video depicts the artist's hand holding a small model moon as honey streams over it. The artwork screened in Times Square across many large advertising screens nightly at 11:59PM during the month of February in 2019. Honey Moon was a part of the public arts programming for Midnight Moment. In an interview with Times Square Arts, \Montgomery said of the Honey Moon project, "We live in an age that often feels more unreal than real, in which things seem to move faster than we can perceive them. As an artist, I wanted to do something different; I wanted to create a sculptural film that felt material, soothing, and real." Midnight Moment is the world's largest, longest-running digital art exhibition, synchronized on electronic billboards throughout Times Square with an estimated annual viewership of 2.5 million.

==== Cut Copy Sphinx (2018) ====
Cut Copy Sphinx is a video artwork inspired by the MeToo Movement against sexual abuse and sexual harassment. The Cut Copy Sphinx video is a companion piece to the artist's public New York City sculpture, SWORD IN THE SPHINX, that was commissioned by Socrates Sculpture Park for the 2018 Socrates Annual exhibition. The video has been exhibited at the New Museum, New Orleans Film Festival (2019), and the Ann Arbor Film Festival (2019).

==== Pony Hotel (2018) ====
The Pony Hotel artwork documents the artist's ponytail prop inside various hotel rooms during her career traveling for Graphic Facilitator work. The video shows the artist as she animates her ponytail like a puppet inside the hotel rooms. The Pony Hotel artwork was part of a video art exhibition series shown at New York City's New Museum in 2019. Curatorial Assistant Kate Weiner wrote that the artworks, including Pony Hotel, "interrogate the relationship between physical and psychic structures." The PONY HOTEL video was presented as a video installation and solo exhibition at Museum Folkwang in Essen, Germany in 2019.

==== Water Witching (2018) ====
The Water Witching video artwork contains archival footages from nature, divination practices, and feminist protest from the 2017 Women's March in Washington D.C. Water Witching thematically explores agency amidst ecological, spiritual, or political adversity. The film's soundscape is composed of field recordings of water, wind, machines, animals, and human protest. Water Witching was commissioned by New York's Center for Curatorial Studies at Bard College for the exhibition, "An unbound knot in the wind" curated by Alison Karasyk.

=== Sculpture ===
==== Marble Ponytails (2019) ====
The Marble Ponytail sculptures are hand-carved in Vermont marble. The sculptures were created in 2018 at the historic West Rutland, Vermont marble quarry on an arts fellowship through the Carving Studio & Sculpture Center in West Rutland, Vermont.

==== Sword in the Sphinx (2018) ====
The Sword in the Sphinx sculpture features a resin-cast copy of a historical French garden sphinx in the likeness of the 18th century court mistress, Madame de Pompadour, impaled by a steel sword. Writer Wendy Vogel for Art in America magazine noted that the sculpture overturns the masculine bravado of the tales of King Arthur and Oedipus. The sculpture was commissioned by Socrates Sculpture Park of New York City for the 2018 Socrates Annual exhibition.

==== Particle Accelerator Memorial Project: Ideation Accelerator (2015-2017) ====
The Particle Accelerator Memorial Project, commissioned by Wright Laboratory at Yale University, is an art project by Montgomery at the Yale University physics department. The artwork is about the decommission of Wright Lab's linear particle accelerator. Montgomery created a large free-standing public sculpture outside the Yale Physics Department's building entitled, Portal (2017). The sculpture is a 9-ton, 14 ft (8.2 t, 4.3 m) blue monument engineered from the original entrance portal of the linear particle accelerator. Portal is Montgomery's first outdoor monument. It is on permanent display at Yale University in New Haven, Connecticut.

==== Split Sword (2017) ====
The Split Sword sculpture is a handmade steel sword. Its shape is inspired by the medieval divination tool known as the Y-rod that was traditionally employed as an alternative means for discovering natural resources such as water, oil, or gold. This process is known as dowsing. The Split Sword artwork has previously been exhibited at Center for Curatorial Studies, Bard College, NY and Ramapo College, NJ.

==== Head Stone (2016) ====
The Head Stone sculpture is made blue memory foam and a 100 lb (45 kg) stone. The Head Stone sculpture has been exhibited at the Center for Curatorial Studies at Bard College and at the Lawndale Art Center.

== Selected exhibitions ==
- (2016) Things You Can't Unthink, Walter Phillips Gallery, Banff Centre for Arts and Creativity, Canada
- (2016) Onsite Offsite Parasite, Greene Gallery, Yale School of Art, New Haven, CT
- (2016) SOS Onshore Offshore, Meyohas Gallery, New York, NY
- (2017) Material Deviance, Sculpture Center, Long Island City, New York
- (2015-2017) Particle Accelerator Memorial Project: Wright Nuclear Structure Laboratory, Yale Department of Physics, New Haven, CT
- (2018) Open Mind, Crush Curatorial, New York, NY
- (2018) Crash Test, La Panacée, Centre d'art contemporain, Montpellier, France
- (2018) An Unbound Knot in the Wind, Center for Curatorial Studies, Bard College, Hudson, NY
- (2018 - 2019) Sword in the Sphinx, Socrates Sculpture Park, New York, NY
- (2019) The Pony Hotel, Museum Folkwang, Essen, Germany
- (2019) Pony Cocoon, False Flag, Long Island City, NY
- (2019) Honey Moon, Times Square Arts, New York, NY
- (2019) Screen Series: VLM, New Museum, NY
- (2020) Sky Loop, Lawndale Art Center, Houston, TX
- (2020) Witch Hunt, Kunsthal Charlottenborg, Copenhagen, Denmark
- (2020) Dream Cocoon, Hesse Flatow Gallery, New York, NY
- (2021) Crit Group: Facing the World, The Contemporary Austin, Austin, TX
- (2021) O Luna: VLM, Aurora Picture Show, Houston, TX
- (2021) VLM, Public Digital Art Fund, Moscow, Russia
- (2022) Art & Health, Blaffer Museum, Houston, TX
- (2023) Magical Home, Kling & Bang Gallery, Reykjavik, Iceland
- (2023) Day Jobs, Blanton Museum of Art, Austin, TX
- (2023) Substrate, Center for Contemporary Art Tel Aviv-Yafo, Tel Aviv, Israel
- (2023) Eye, Moon, Cocoon, Women & Their Work, Austin, Texas
- (2024) Day Jobs, Cantor Museum, Stanford, California
- (2025) Elemental Currents at Ballroom Marfa, Marfa, Texas
- (2025) Tent Series at Moody Arts Center at Rice University, Houston, Texas
