= VLM Airlines =

Belgian regional airline

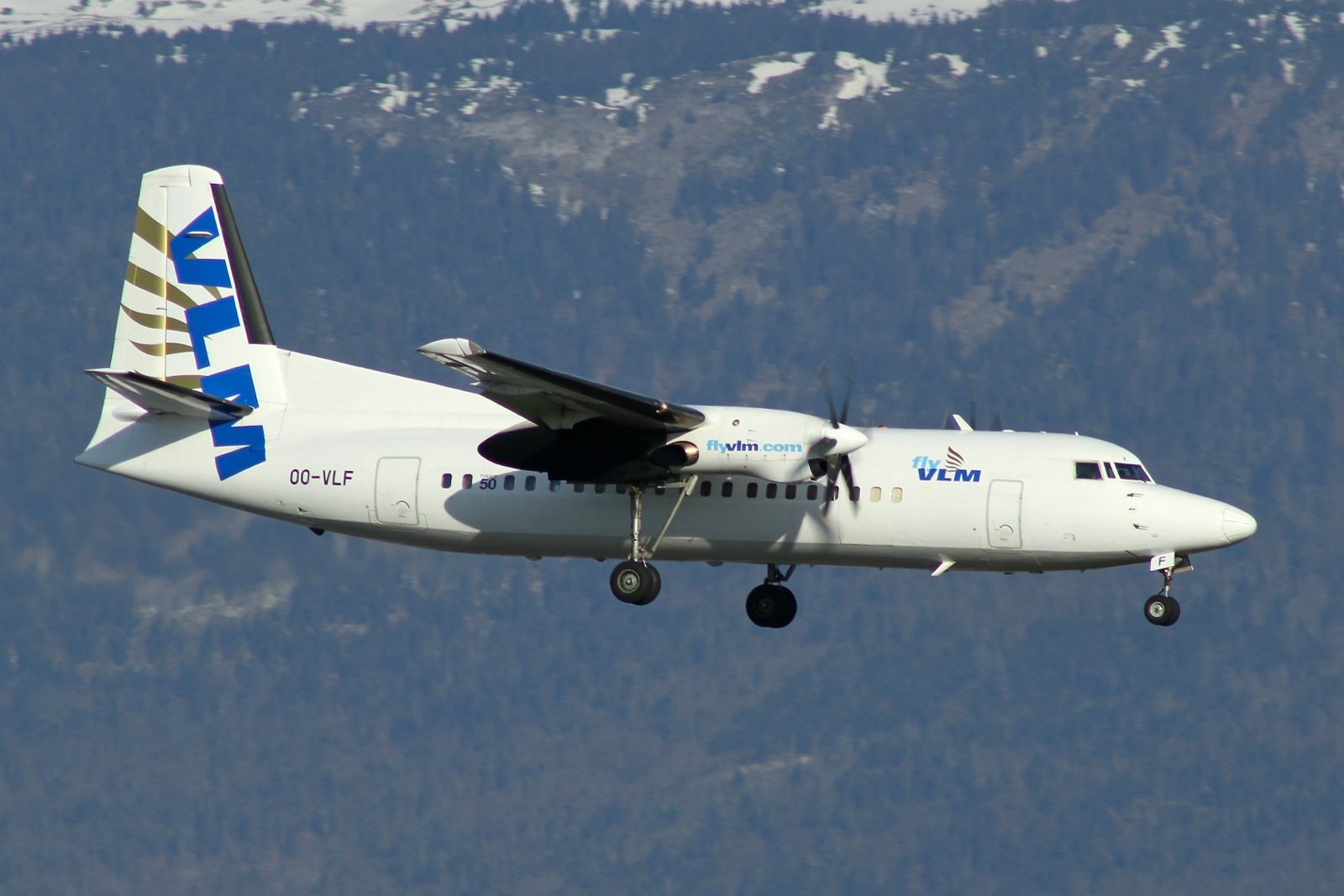
- Fokker 50
IATA	ICAO	Call sign
VG	VLM	RUBENS
- Founded: 9 September 2016
- Commenced operations: October 2017
- Ceased operations: 31 August 2018
- Focus cities: Antwerp International Airport
- Subsidiaries: VLM Airlines Brussels (closed in December 2018); VLM Airlines Slovenia (closed in September 2018)
- Fleet size: 6
- Destinations: 7
- Parent company: SHS Antwerp Aviation
- Headquarters: Deurne, Antwerp, Belgium
- Key people: Johan Maertens, CEO
- Employees: 85
- Website: www.flyvlm.com

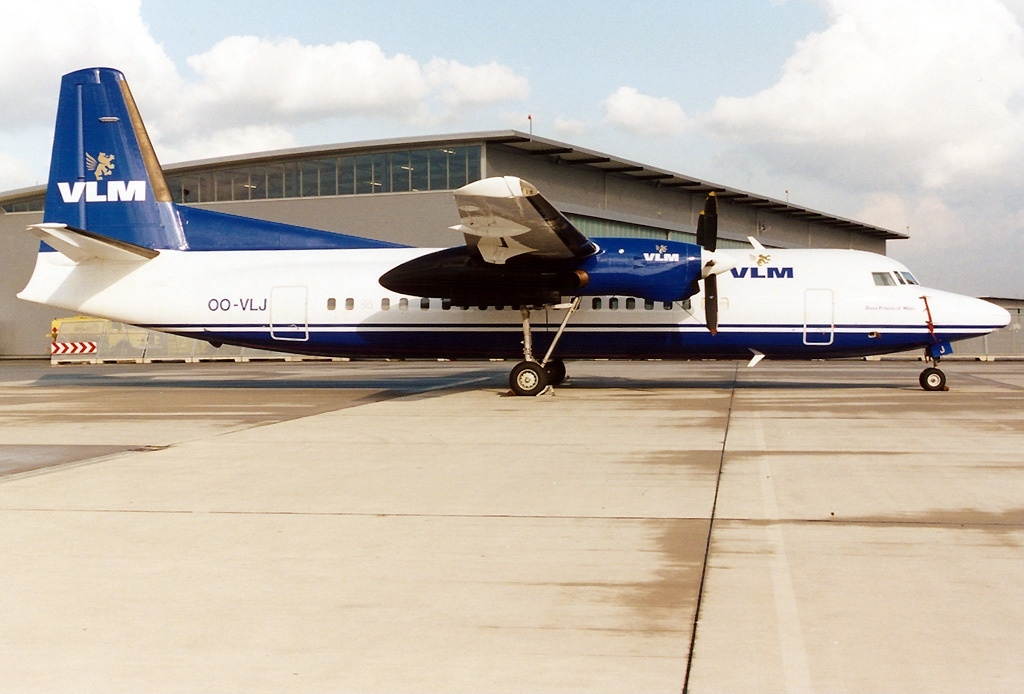
Fokker 50 in the first livery

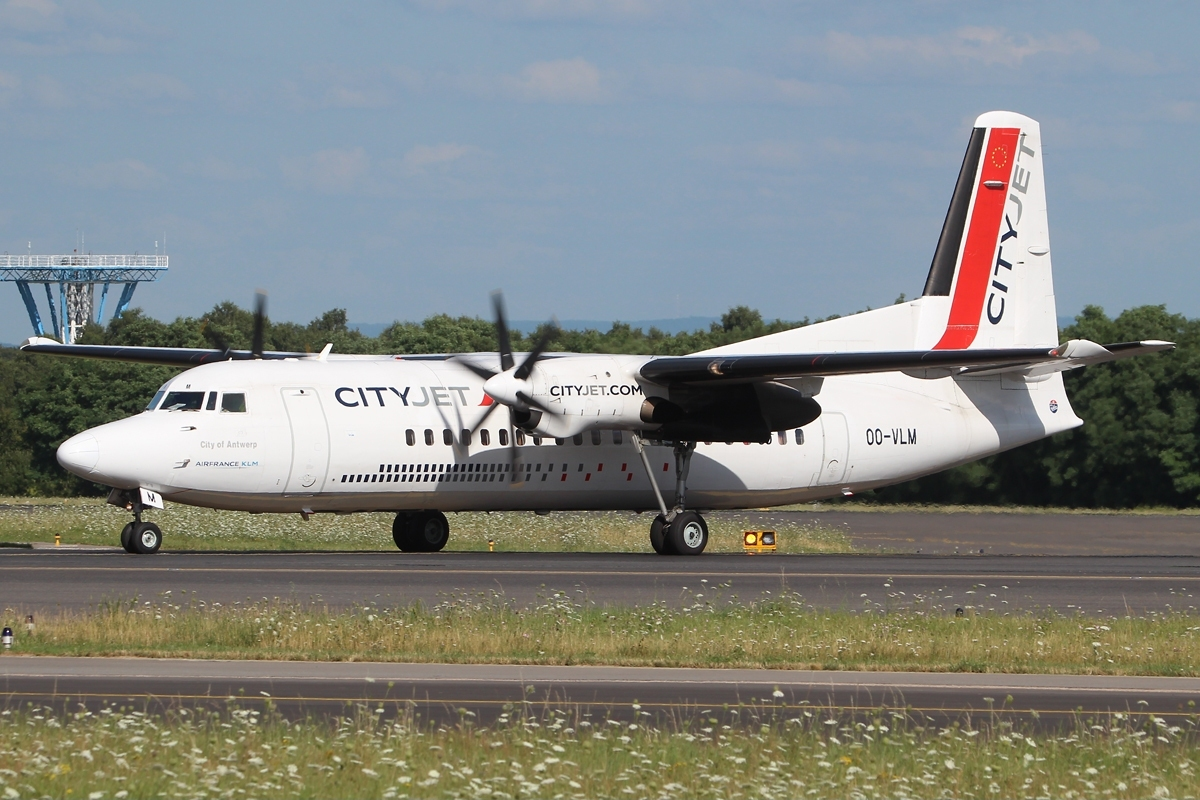
Fokker 50 in CityJet livery

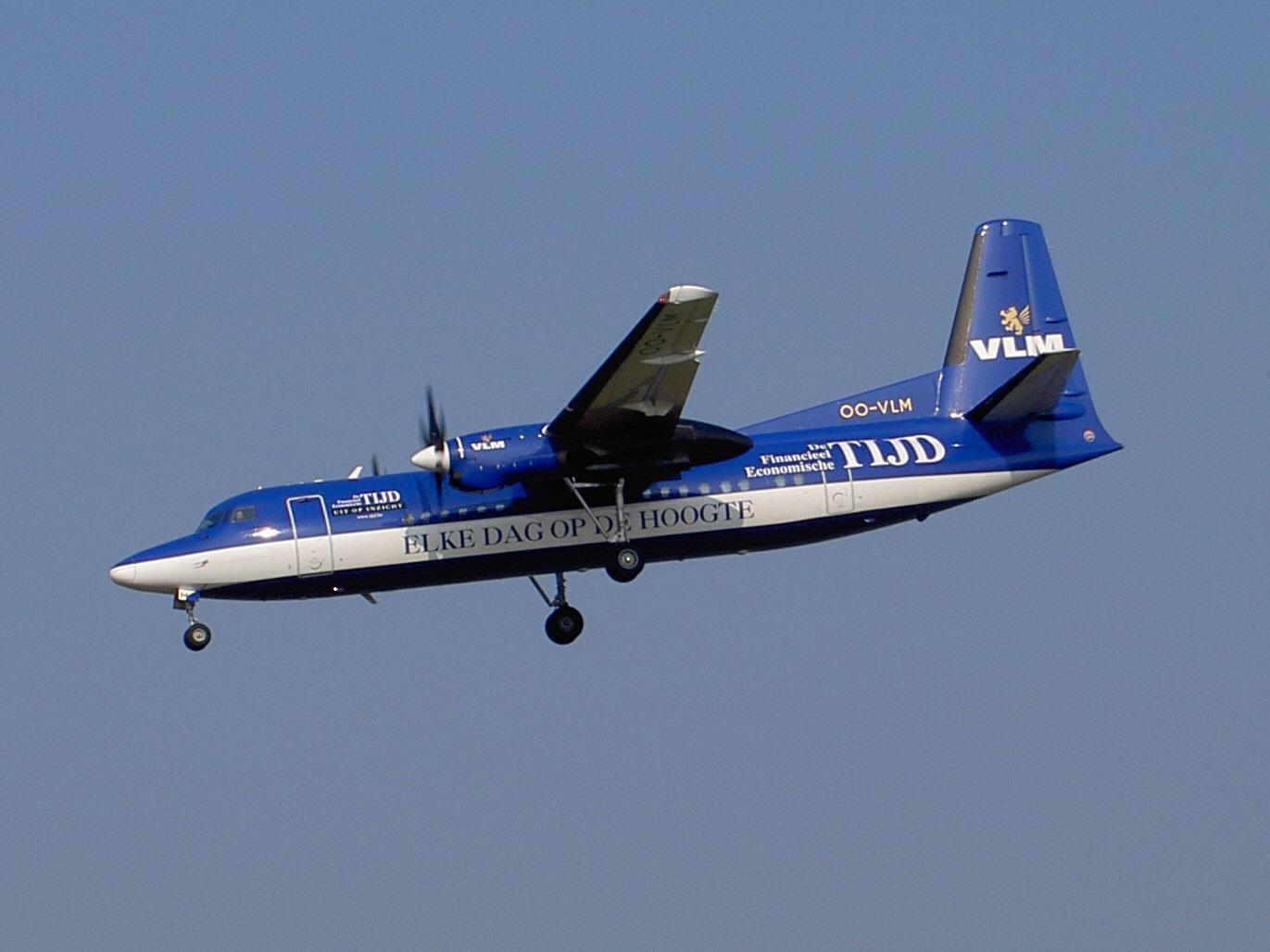
Fokker 50

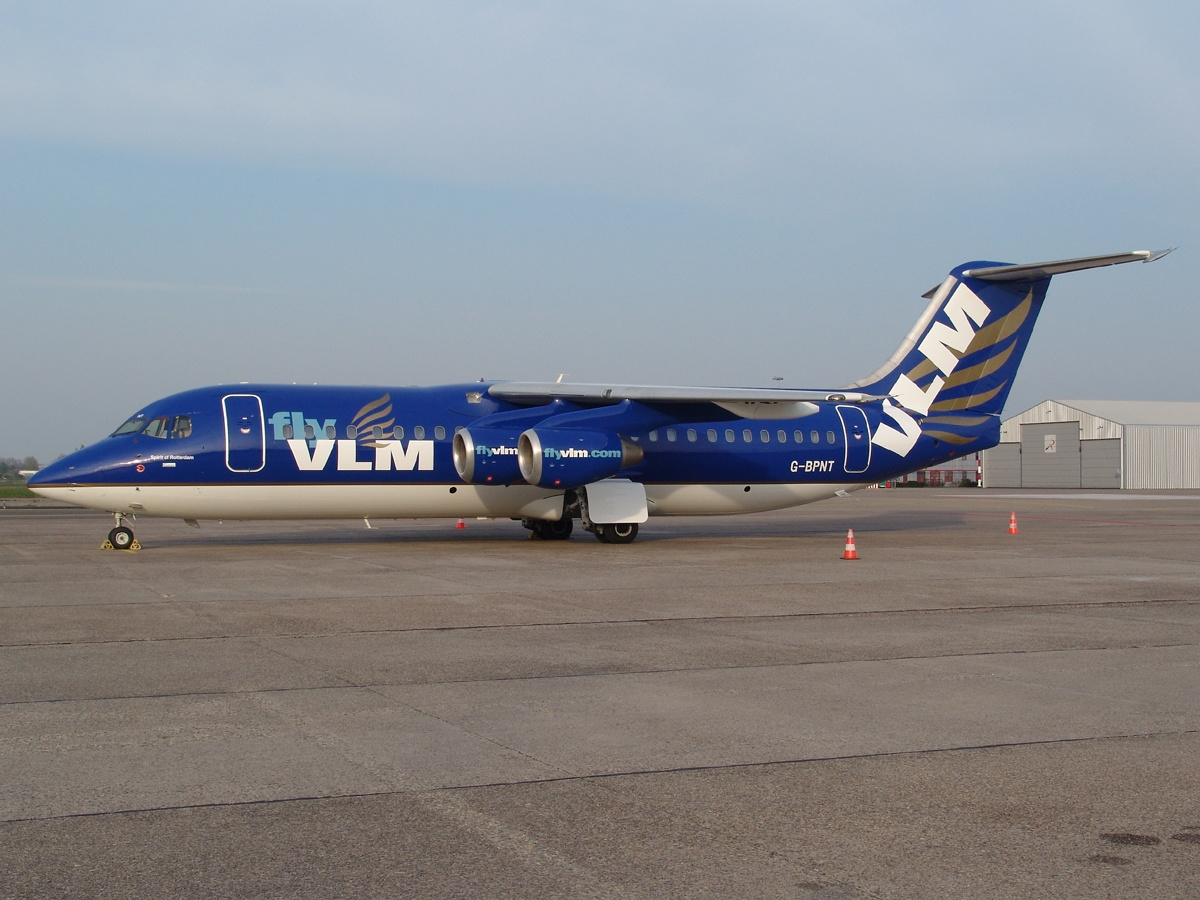
Leased BAe 146-300

VLM Airlines, short for Vlaamse Luchttransport Maatschappij ("Flemish Air Transport Company"), was a Belgian airline offering scheduled, charter and ACMI (aircraft, crew, maintenance and insurance) services. It was headquartered at Antwerp International Airport in Deurne. After getting to difficultiy and ownership changes, it ceased operations on 31 August 2018. It is not to be confused with the almost homonymous Belgian airline VLM Airlines Brussels, which operated leisure charters and ceased operations in December 2018.

== History ==
=== Early years ===
VLM Airlines was established in February 1992 and started operations in May of the following year with a scheduled service between Antwerp International Airport and London City Airport. Its original hub was Antwerp; this was switched to London City, and after a management buy-out late in 2014, it was again based at Antwerp Airport.

On 24 December 2007, Air France-KLM agreed to buy the company from Panta Holdings. In 2008 the airline reported its tenth consecutive year of profits; for the year ending 31 December 2007 it had a net profit of 3.6m euros. Turnover grew to 112m euros and passenger numbers rose 9% to 745,781 during 2007. The airline at this point employed over 400 people, and carried 745,781 passengers in 2007.

On 28 May 2009, Air France-KLM announced that VLM Airlines would gradually start to operate under the brand name CityJet. The name CityJet was already used by Business City Direct, the Irish regional partner of Air France-KLM. In early 2010 VLM Airlines name was being replaced altogether by CityJet but this integration was never completed. On 16 February 2010 CityJet launched a new seating configuration on their aircraft, including the Fokker 50 aircraft added during the attempted integration. They were fitted with CityPlus, a 4-abreast premium economy class along with CityValue, the standard economy.

VLM used to promote itself as Europe's leading "business airline" and tried to reflect this in its goal of superior service. Passengers were served fresh meals on board, and were able to request a vegetarian or kosher meal at the time of reservation. Meals were presented on a half-tray, and all passengers were served drinks in real glasses with tea and coffee served in china cups. Such features were not commonly found on short-haul airlines. After the CityJet takeover, this offer was downgraded to reflect the Air France-KLM standard on short-haul flights—a simpler service of sandwiches and drinks, with glassware and china cups replaced by plastic. However, the airline did continue to distribute boiled sweets to its passengers before take-off, and Belgian chocolates mid-flight.

=== Development since the 2010s ===
In early 2014, following the sale of CityJet ownership to German investor Intro Aviation, the latter decided to separate Cityjet and VLM. VLM would from then on provide aircraft and crews on an ACMI basis.

In October 2014, however, the management of VLM Airlines undertook a management buyout and the airline became independent from both CityJet and Intro Aviation. The CEO, Arthur White, became the majority shareholder. The company continued to provide services to Cityjet and to offer charter services and reintroduced scheduled flights from Antwerp to Geneva and other destinations. In the same month the airline signed a contract to lease two Sukhoi Superjet 100s, with options for 12 more, as a possible replacement for the Fokker 50s, to be delivered from April 2015. This date was later revised to 2016 due to certification delays, however the order was cancelled.

In March 2015, it was announced that VLM would take over two routes from Waterford Airport, Ireland to the UK which were previously served by Stobart Air and Flybe. The routes to London Luton and Birmingham started in late April 2015 and continued throughout 2016. In June 2015, VLM announced it would discontinue all operations to and from their new base at Liège Airport (to Avignon, Nice and Venice) after only six weeks of service, due to low demand. In December 2015, VLM Airlines announced it would base three aircraft at Friedrichshafen Airport in Germany by February 2016 to take over the domestic routes to Berlin, Düsseldorf and Hamburg previously provided by bankrupt regional carrier InterSky.

=== Demise ===
On 13 May 2016, VLM Airlines filed for bankruptcy protection at a court in Antwerp after accumulating €6 million of debt. On May 25, 2016, bankruptcy protection was granted for a duration of six months. VLM planned to continue its operations with a turn around plan that envisaged a return to break even in mid 2017 with the main focus on improving cash flow, stabilising the economic situation and stabilising operations. After the bankruptcy protection was announced, several pilots left the airline due to a restructuring plan which focused on cost reduction and maximizing revenue. At short notice VLM Airlines announced the termination of flights from Waterford Airport to London-Luton by 13 June 2016, leaving Waterford with no scheduled link.

On 22 June 2016, People's Viennaline announced the cancellation of its ACMI contract with VLM without further notice, citing a lack of quality in the provided services (e.g. several delays and cancellations). Later on that same day, VLM Airlines declared bankruptcy and all flights were cancelled with immediate effect and all planes grounded. The airline's website was shut down a few hours later.

Owing to VLM's demise, CityJet ACMI customer opted for Danish Air Transport on the London City Airport to Antwerp route.

=== New ownership, restart of operations and second demise ===
On 9 September 2016, SHS Antwerp Aviation (owned by SHS Aviation b.v. of Netherlands) reached an agreement with receivers and the airine started to be rebuilt from the scrap. From November 2016, it employed 15 people but to start operations, a new AOC was needed. It took one year before all papers would be in order. In March 2017 SHS Aviation announced it would take over the flight licences, two of the remaining Thomas Cook Airlines Belgium aircraft, and the remaining 40 employees, and integrate them into the reestablished VLM Airlines. Two Airbus A320 aircraft (OO-TCT and OO-TCX) were instead re-registered to VLM Airlines. Their first flight was TCW7011 from Brussels to Eskisehir Airport and returning to Brussels as TCW7012 on 11 November 2017.

VLM restarted the London City Airport to Antwerp route on 30 October 2017, taking over the route previously operated by Danish Air Transport. The fleet had seven Fokker 50's registered to SHS Antwerp Aviation.

In February 2018 SF Aviation Management B.V., a Dutch investor, took over the former Thomas Cook Airlines Belgium activities and aircraft that were delivered to the herewith unrelated VLM Airlines (Brussels). The Antwerp activities would continue as VLM Regional. One of the A320 aircraft was returned to Thomas Cook. The remaining A320 (OO-TCT) was used for charter and ACMI activities. On 17 June 2018, CEO Harm Jan Prins announced an A321 would soon join the fleet. On 24 April, VLM announced routes from Manchester to Antwerp and Ostend-Bruges to be launched on 1 October 2018. However, these plans were cancelled shortly after.

On 6 August 2018, VLM Airlines announced the termination of all scheduled routes from Antwerp International Airport except two (the remaining destinations being London and Zurich) in the coming weeks to focus on charter operations. At the same time, VLM announced the decommissioning of their Fokker 50 fleet while a new aircraft type was to be acquired for charter operations.

On 31 August 2018 however, VLM ceased all flight operations following a decision by its shareholders to go into liquidation.

== Destinations ==
As of 21 August 2018, shortly before its demise, VLM Airlines operated to the following scheduled destinations: Belgium

- Antwerp – Antwerp International Airport base

Germany

- Cologne – Cologne Bonn Airport (was to be terminated on 16 September 2018)
- Munich – Munich Airport (was to be terminated on 14 September 2018)
- Rostock – Rostock–Laage Airport (was to be terminated on 16 September 2018)

Switzerland

- Zürich – Zürich Airport

United Kingdom

- Aberdeen – Aberdeen Airport (was to be terminated on 14 September 2018)
- London – London City Airport

=== Former destinations ===
Ireland

- Waterford – Waterford Airport

Slovenia

- Maribor – Maribor Edvard Rusjan Airport base

United Kingdom

- Birmingham – Birmingham Airport
- London – Luton Airport

Germany

- Mönchengladbach – Mönchengladbach Airport

Luxembourg

- Luxembourg – Luxembourg Airport

== Fleet ==
As of August 2018, the VLM Airlines fleet included the following aircraft. Not included are the fleets of VLM Airlines Slovenia, which operated other Fokker 50s.

VLM Airlines fleet
Aircraft	In service	Orders	Passengers	Notes
Fokker 50	6	—	50	were to be retired
Total	6	—		
