= Cimber (airline) =

Danish airline, 2012–2018

Cimber A/S

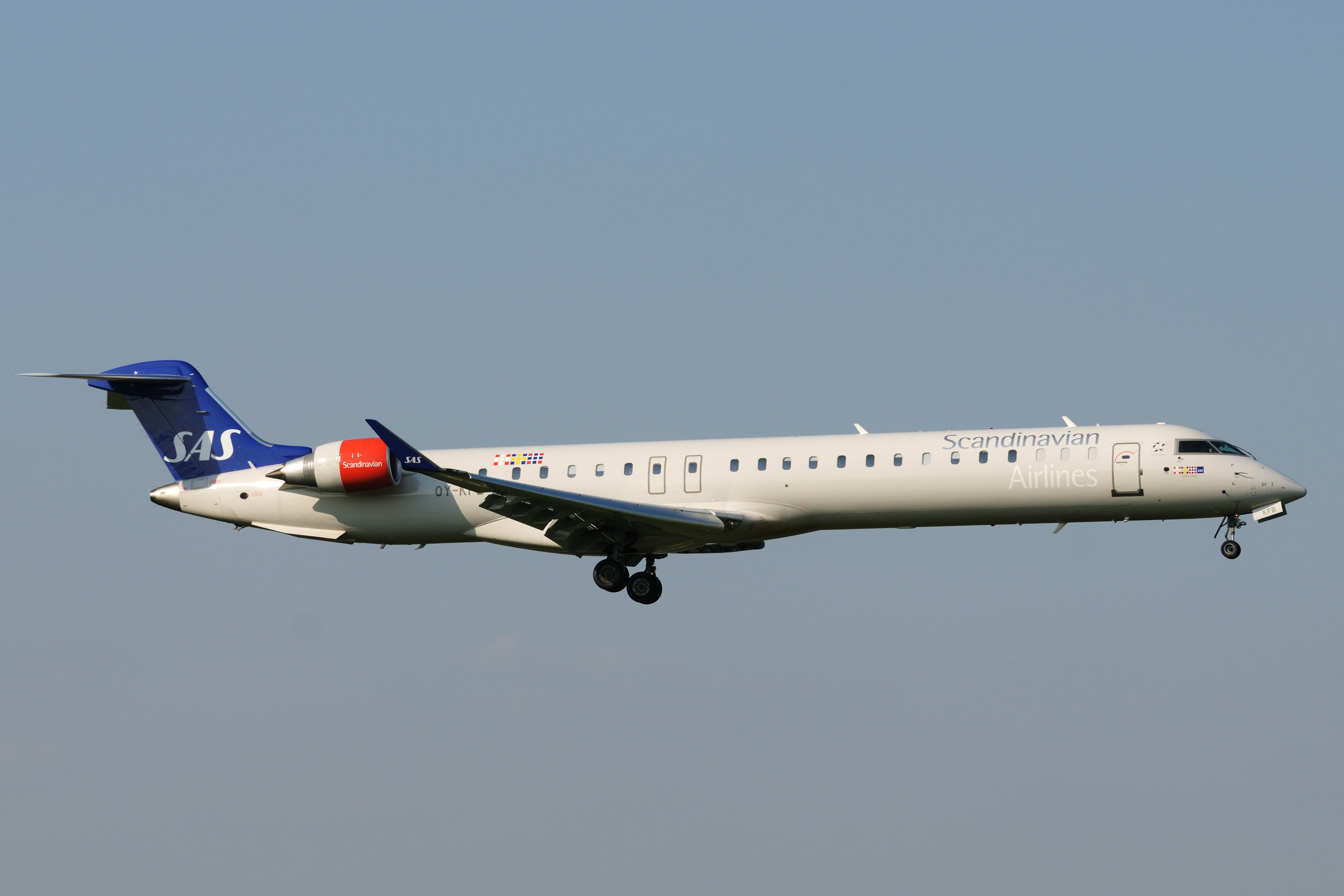
- Bombardier CRJ900 operated for Scandinavian Airlines
IATA	ICAO	Call sign
QA	CIM	CIMBER
- Founded: 15 May 2012; 14 years ago
- Commenced operations: 16 May 2012; 14 years ago
- Ceased operations: 2018; 8 years ago
- Hubs: Copenhagen Airport
- Fleet size: 9
- Parent company: CityJet (since 2017)
- Headquarters: Sønderborg, Denmark
- Website: cimber.dk

Cimber A/S was a Danish airline headquartered in Sønderborg and based at Copenhagen Airport. It flies exclusively for Scandinavian Airlines (SAS) on a wet lease (ACMI) contract. Cimber has been owned by CityJet since early 2017 and was previously a subsidiary of SAS.

== History ==
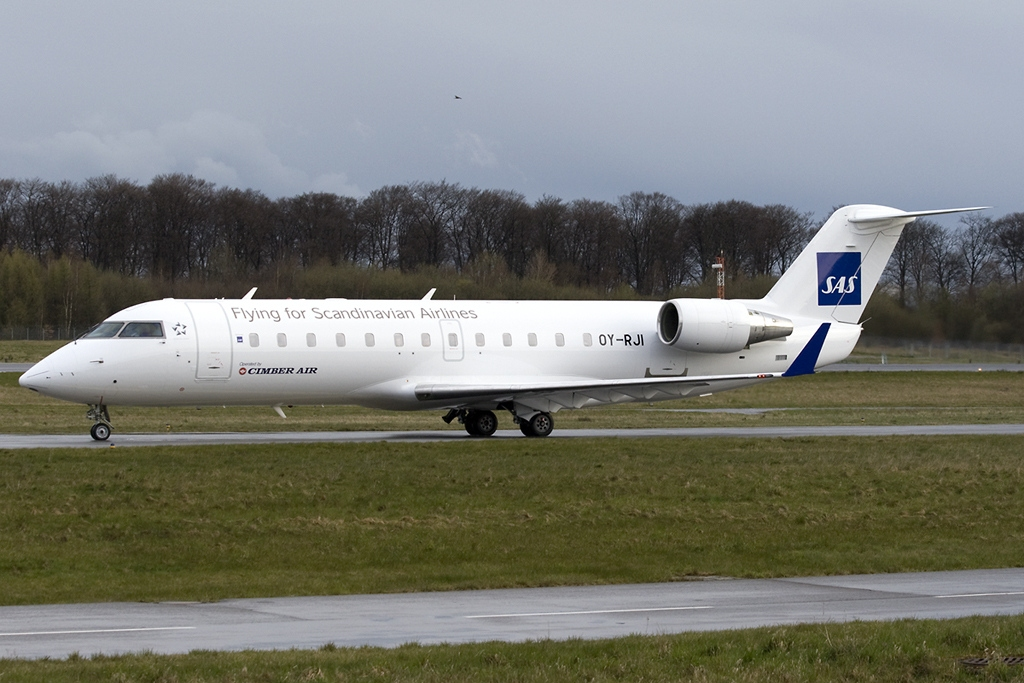
Bombardier CRJ-200

Cimber Sterling went bankrupt on 3 May 2012. At that point, the airline had been flying to up to 30 destinations daily, primarily in Northern and Eastern Europe from Copenhagen Airport, on behalf of Scandinavian Airlines, with four Bombardier CRJ-200 aircraft. This arrangement was extended by the curator, law firm Kromann Reumert, to 16 May, as it was profitable.

On 16 May, it was announced that several parts of Cimber Sterling had been sold, including the ACMI contract with Scandinavian Airlines. The buyers of the contract were former key people of Cimber Sterling, Jørgen Nielsen (son of the Cimber Air founder Ingolf Nielsen), the former juridical director Alex Dyrgaard, and the former CEO of the airline Jacob Krogsgaard. The deal included 114 employees who would continue as part of Cimber A/S. At the same time, Scandinavian Airlines and Cimber A/S signed an extension of the agreement, valid till the summer 2014. Cimber had no plans of flying under own name, but will only operate for other airlines. Cimber began with a share capital of DKK 600,000.

In September 2014, Cimber announced the shutdown of its operations by March 2015 as Scandinavian Airlines as their single customer did not intend to renew their contracts. But in December 2014, Scandinavian Airlines announced that it had entered into an agreement to acquire 100% of Cimber for DKK20 million (US$3.3 million). Scandinavian Airlines planned to transfer 12 CRJ900 aircraft to Cimber to operate from Copenhagen Airport and to continue with the Cimber's previous plans to retire its ATR 72 and CRJ200 aircraft.

In January 2017, SAS reached an agreement with CityJet whereby CityJet bought Cimber and would continue to operate flights on behalf of SAS. Cimber was merged into CityJet in 2018.

== Destinations ==
Cimber did not operate any routes under its own brand. All flights were conducted on behalf of Scandinavian Airlines, within their regional and European route network.

== Fleet ==
=== Former fleet ===
The airline previously operated the following aircraft:

- 9 Bombardier CRJ900ER
- 2 Bombardier CRJ200ER
