= Austrian Airlines =

Flag carrier of Austria

Austrian Airlines AG

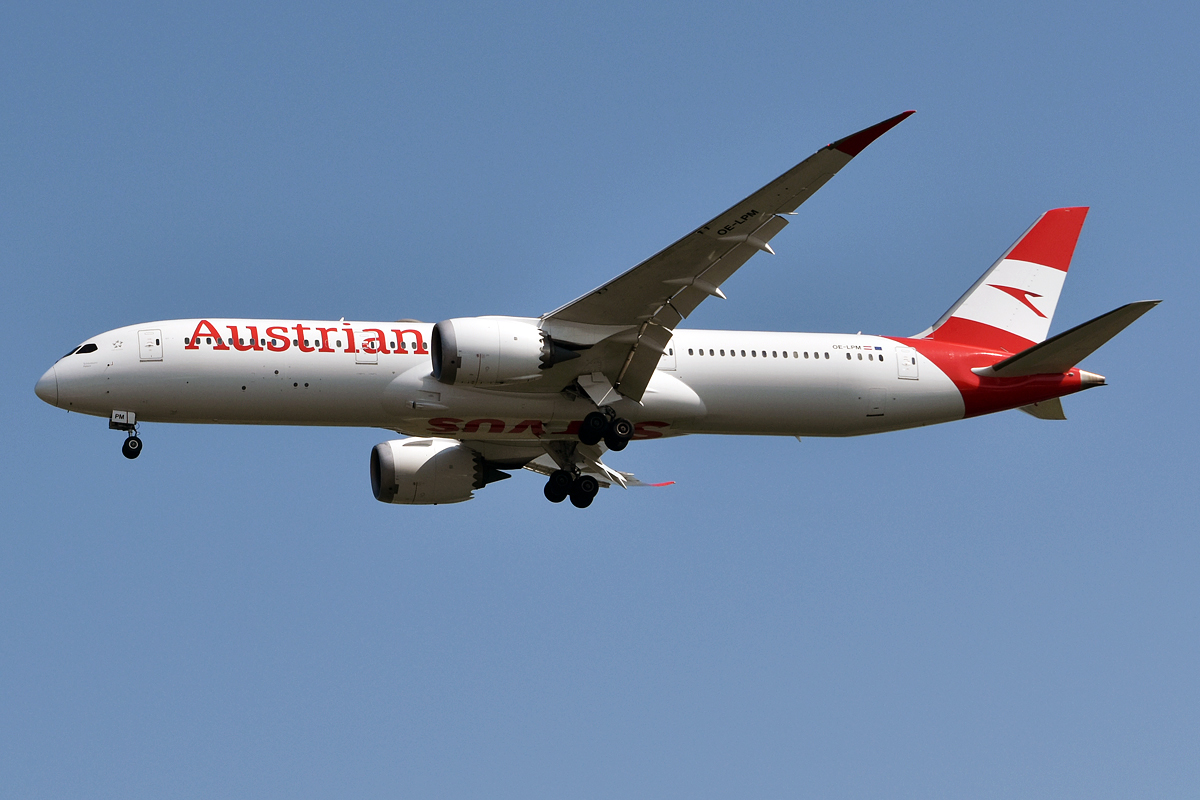
- Boeing 787-9
IATA	ICAO	Call sign
OS	AUA	AUSTRIAN
- Founded: 3 May 1923; 103 years ago (as ÖLAG)
- Commenced operations: 31 March 1958; 68 years ago
- Hubs: Vienna International Airport
- Frequent-flyer program: Miles & More
- Alliance: Star Alliance
- Fleet size: 65
- Destinations: 121
- Parent company: Lufthansa Group
- Headquarters: Schwechat, Austria
- Key people: Annette Mann (CEO)
- Revenue: ▲€ 1.871 bil. (2022)
- Operating income: ▲€ 3.0 mil. (2022)
- Employees: 5,659 (as of December 2022)
- Website: www.austrian.com

Austrian Airlines (often shortened to Austrian or AUA) is the flag carrier of Austria and a subsidiary of Lufthansa, the flag carrier of Germany. The airline is headquartered on the grounds of Vienna International Airport in Schwechat, Austria, where it also maintains its hub. As of September 2026, the airline operates an average of around 320 daily flights to and from more than 120 destinations. It is a member of Star Alliance.

Air Austria and Austrian Airways merged to form the airline in 1957, but its history dates back to the founding of Austrian Airways in 1923. Throughout much of the company's existence, it was a state-owned entity. On 31 March 1958, the airline performed its scheduled service, flying a leased Vickers Viscount from Vienna to Zürich and London; it subsequently purchased its own Viscount fleet. On 18 February 1963, Austrian ordered its first jet-powered airliner, the Sud Aviation Caravelle. It subsequently introduced various models and derivatives of the Douglas DC-9 jetliner; by the end of 1971, Austrian was an all-jet operator. During the 1980s, it introduced the DC-9-80, otherwise known as the McDonnell Douglas MD-80, to its fleet. Various airliners produced by Airbus, Boeing, Fokker and other manufacturers were introduced across the 1980s and 1990s.

Throughout the 1990s, the airline sought out new strategic alliances, as well as to expand its presence in the long-haul market, launching new services to China and South Africa. In 2000, Austrian became a member of Star Alliance; a few years prior, it had also joined the Qualiflyer Group. During the 2000s, the airline expanded through the acquisitions of Rheintalflug and Lauda Air and adopted the shortened Austrian name in 2003. Throughout the 2000s, Austrian sustained several years of losses; during 2008, the airline's then-owner, the Austrian government, was advised to privatise Austrian via its sale to a foreign company. In 2009, the Lufthansa Group purchased Austrian after receiving approval from the European Commission following an investigation into the tendering process.

Following its privatisation, the business restructured, enacting both fleet expansion and cost-saving initiatives; visible changes included route alterations, a new corporate design, and a revised aircraft livery. Following labour disputes over several of the cost-cutting measures, all Austrian Airlines' flights were transferred on 1 July 2012 to its subsidiary, Tyrolean Airways, which operated under the Austrian name. A new labour agreement led to the transfer of all flights back to Austrian Airlines on 1 April 2015, and the merger of Tyrolean Airways into its parent company. During the late 2010s, restructuring of both its fleet and route network continued.

== History ==
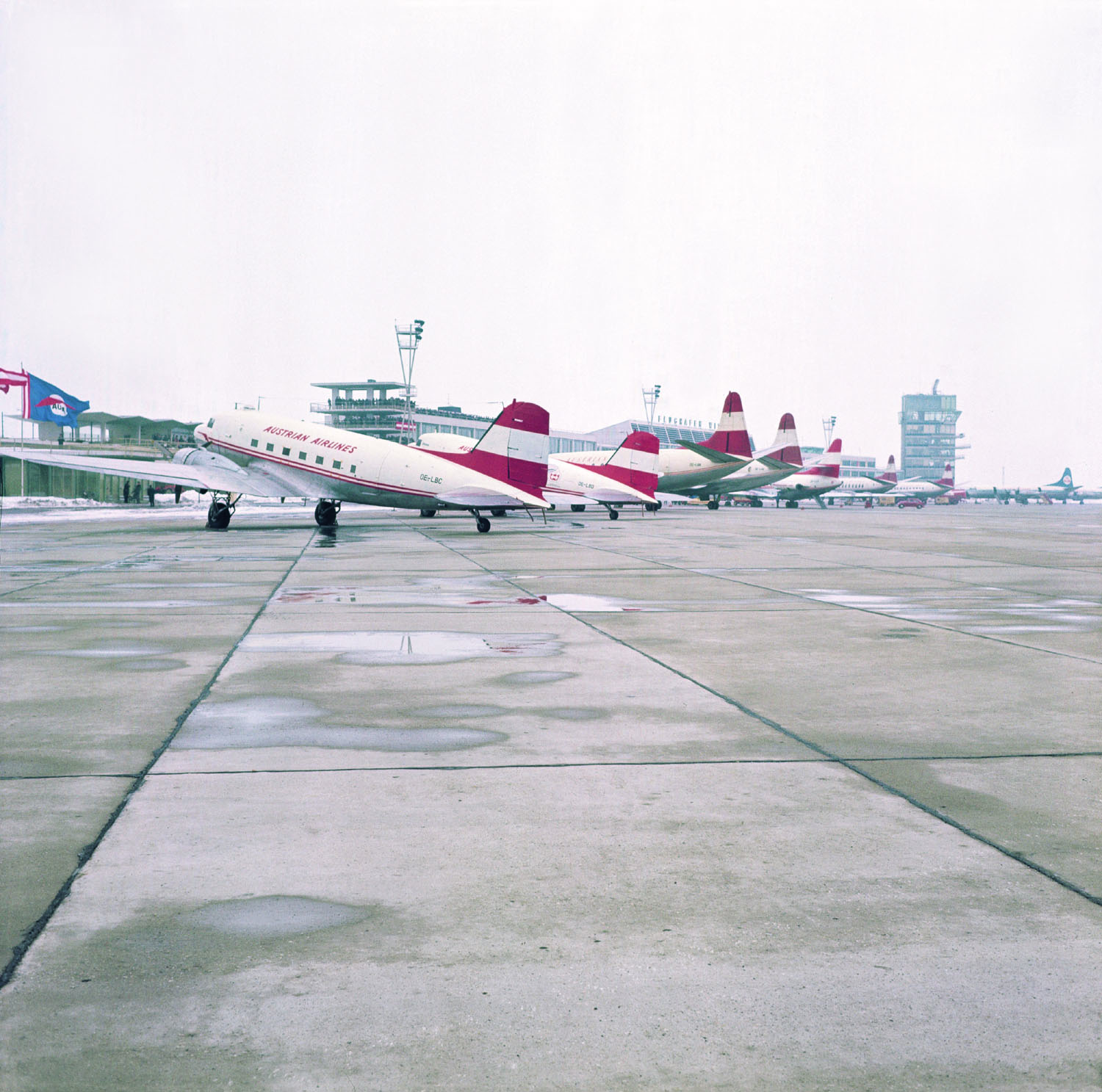
Historic Austrian Airlines aircraft including Douglas DC-3s at Vienna Airport, date unknown

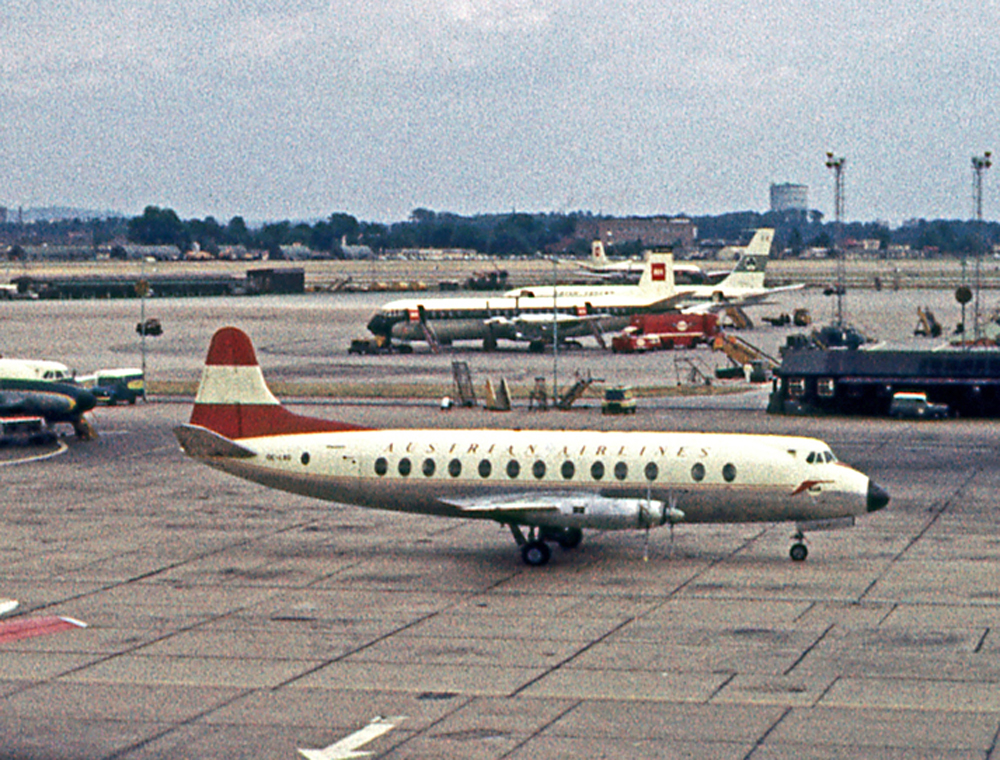
An Austrian Airlines Vickers Viscount 837 at London-Heathrow in 1962

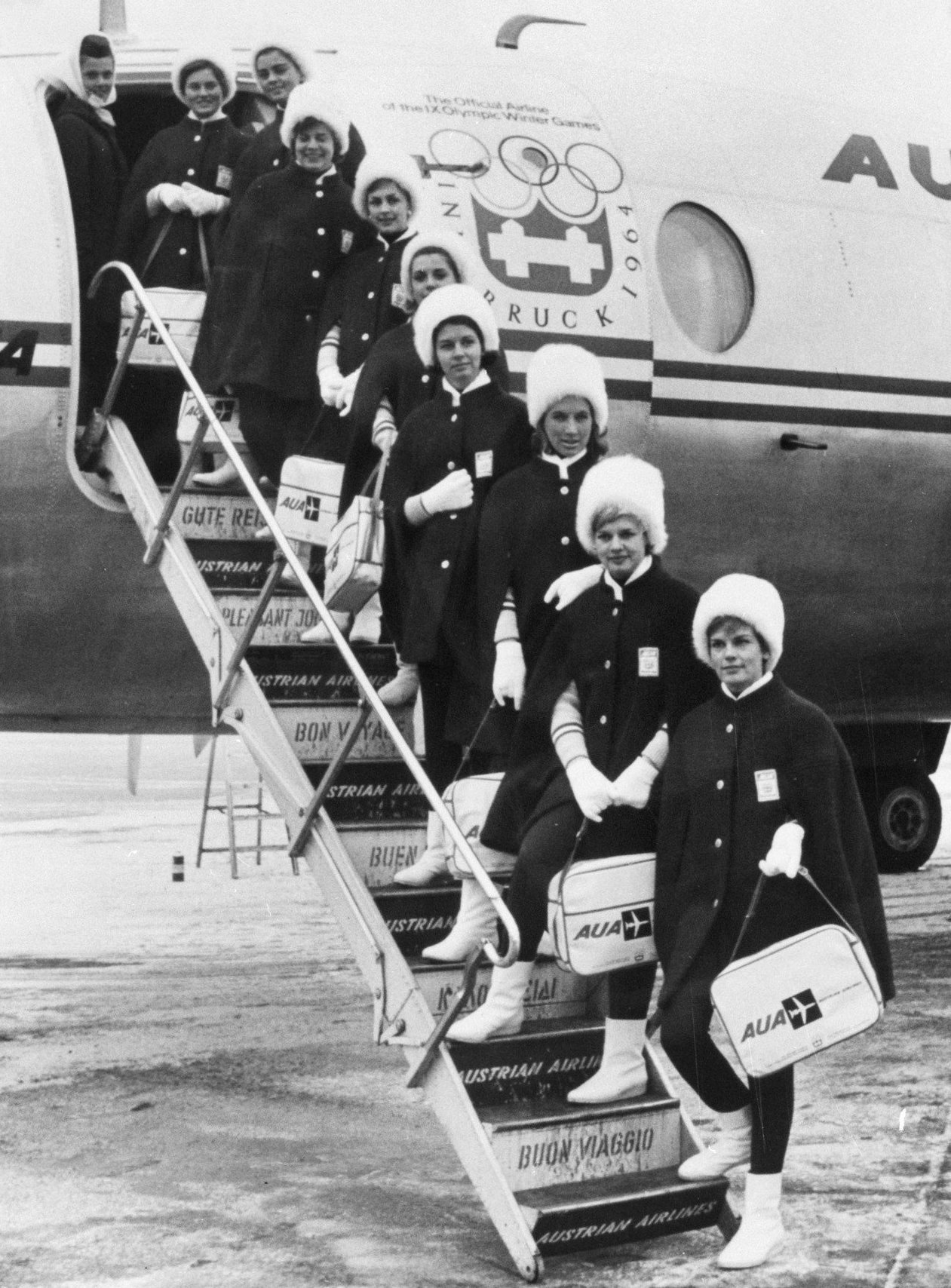
Austrian Airlines flight attendants in 1964, displaying their then new uniforms for the 1964 Winter Olympic Games held in Innsbruck

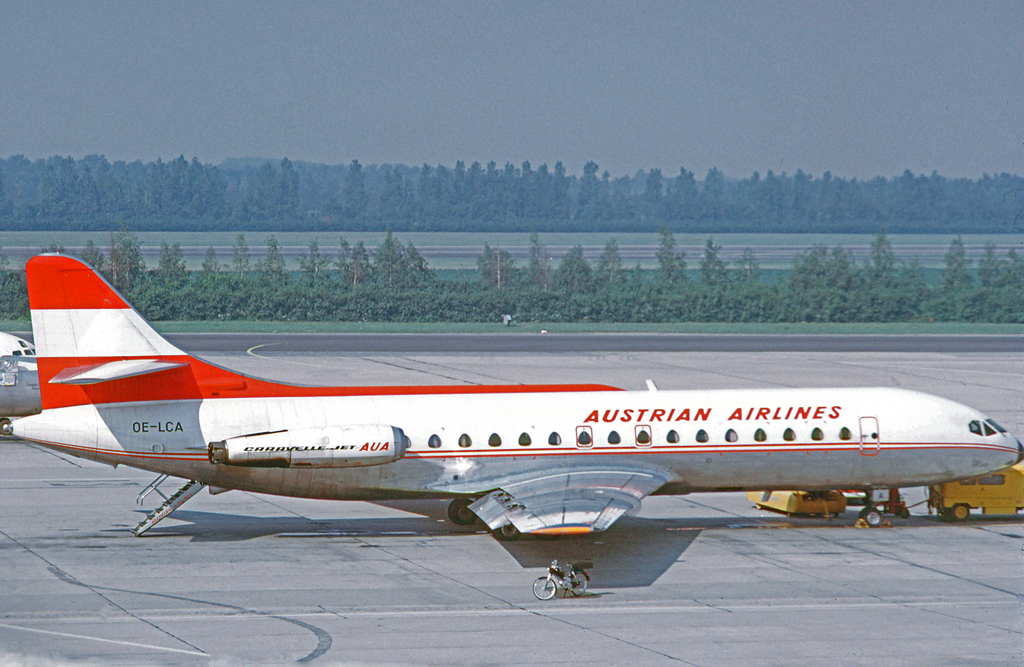
An Austrian Airlines Sud Caravelle in 1972.

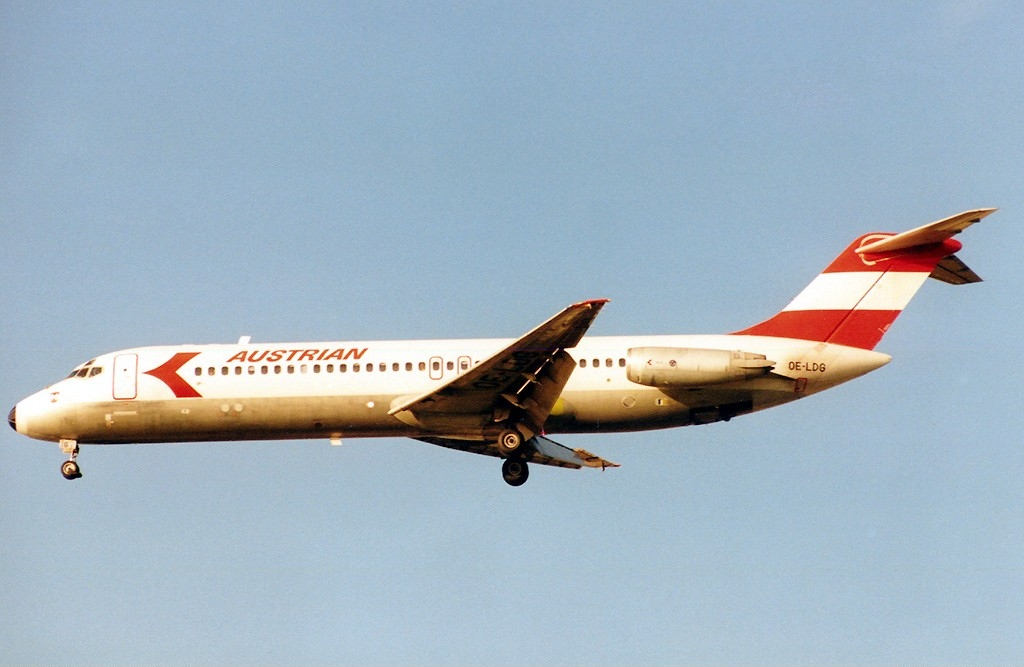
An Austrian Airlines McDonnell Douglas DC-9 in 1989

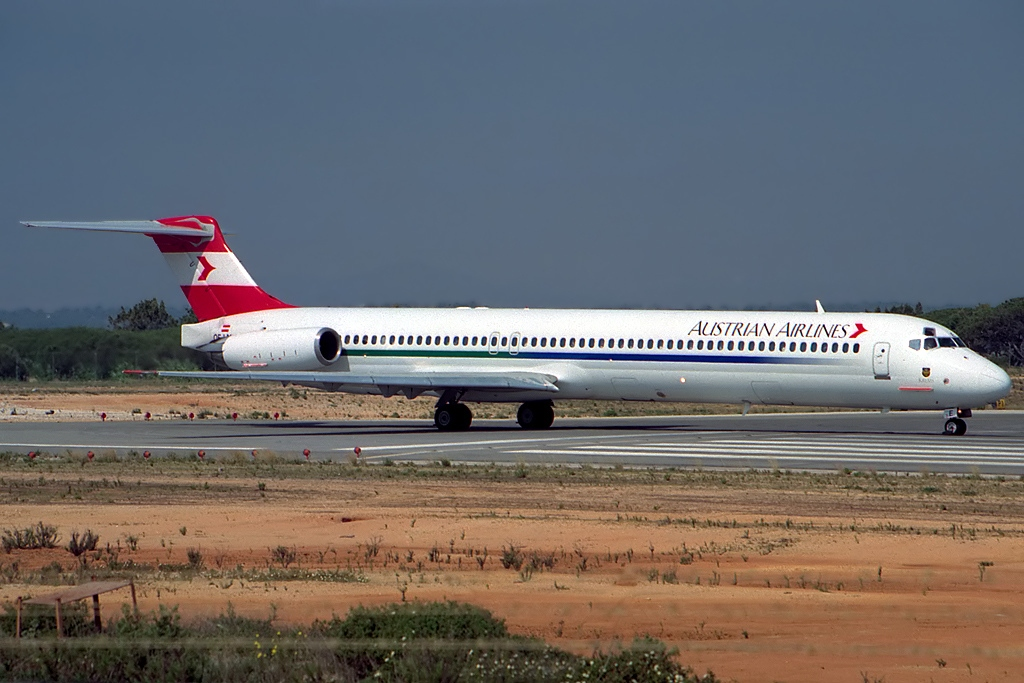
A McDonnell Douglas MD-83 in 1997

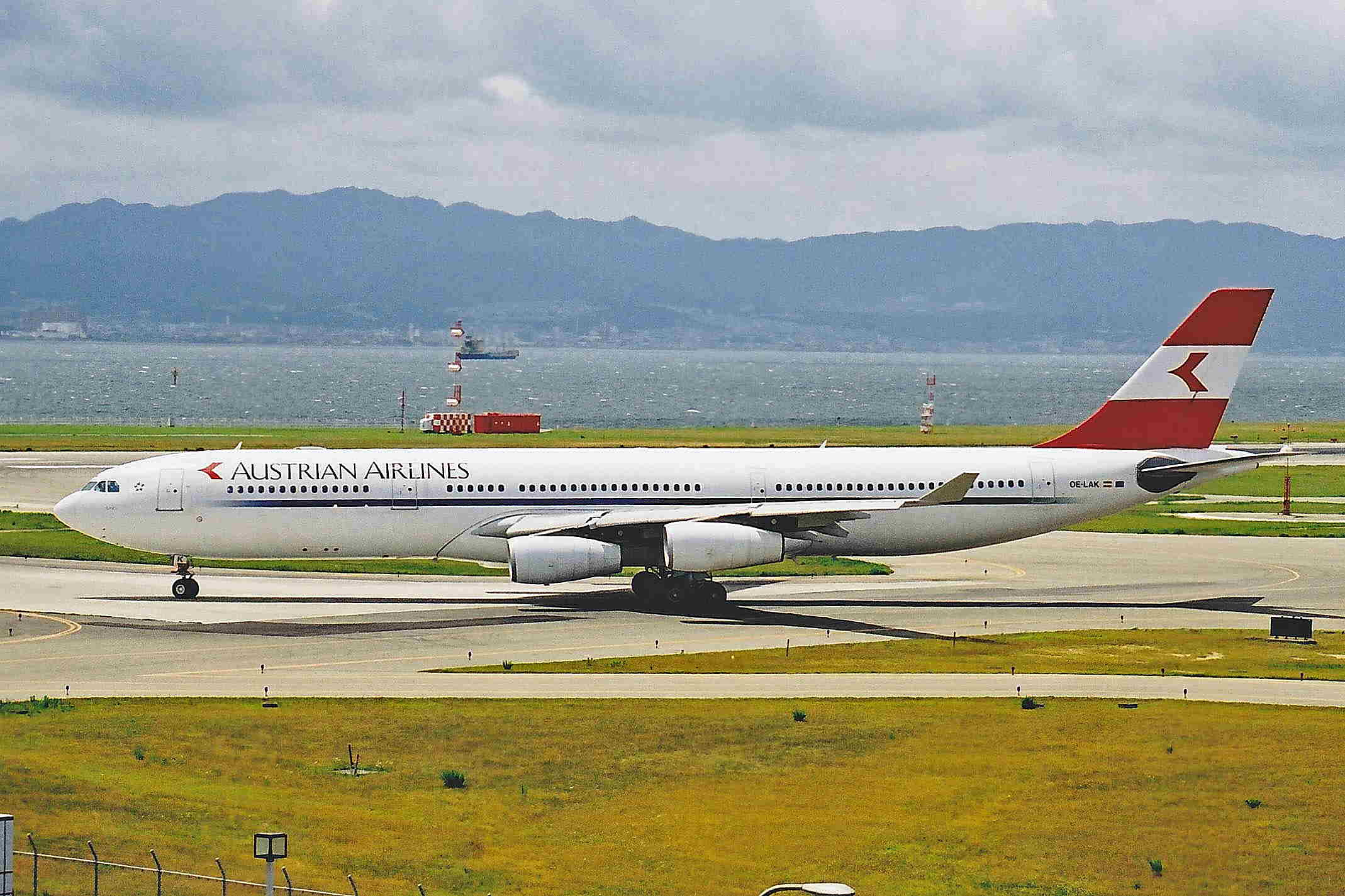
An Austrian Airbus A340-300 at Osaka-Kansai in 2001

=== Early years ===
On 3 May 1923, Walter Barda-Bardenau received approval from the Austrian government to establish an airline. He participated in the newly formed Austrian Airlines (German: Österreichische Luftverkehrs AG) with one percent, with the remaining shares going to the Austrian railway transportation company (50%) and the Junkers-Werke (49%).

The company's initial fleet consisted of Junkers F 13s. On 14 May 1923, the first flight performed by the fledging airline was conducted between Vienna and Munich, piloted by Hans Baur. The landing occurred in Jedlesee, followed by a conversion to a float and a subsequent flight to Budapest. Junkers Trans European Union was the company operating the flight. Its destinations included Munich, Budapest, Nuremberg, Graz, Klagenfurt, and St. Wolfgang. Seaplanes served targets in Austria. September 1926 saw the dissolution of the union.

From 1927, the company procured new aircraft with support from the government. During the same year, it formed an operating partnership agreement with Deutsche Luft Hansa. The two companies jointly planned and operated line connections and created a route network to Berlin, Budapest, and Milan. In 1932, Luft Hansa Junkers held a 49% interest in the company. Following its recovery from the Great Depression, the firm expanded its fleet by adding several Junkers Ju 52/3 m. The firm's rapid growth throughout the 1930s led to it becoming the fourth-largest airline in Europe at one point.

In 1938, the company began planning routes to Rome, Paris, and London, using a fleet of Junkers Ju 90 aircraft. Following the annexation of Austria by Nazi Germany in March 1938, these plans were promptly abandoned. From 1 January 1939, the airline was fully under the control of Lufthansa. Lufthansa deleted the company from the commercial register in June 1939.

In the aftermath of World War II, Austria was claimed independence from Germany. While it recognized as independent state due to the Austrian State Treaty of 1955, the newly reconstituted nation initially lacked a national airline. In 1955, two distinct companies, Air Austria and Austrian Airways, swiftly emerged to address this unoccupied market. On 4 April 1957, Austrian Airlines was formed under the corporate name Österreichische Luftverkehrs AG through the merger of Air Austria and Austrian Airways. On 30 September 1957, the new entity commenced operations, performing its maiden flight on 31 March 1958 when a leased Vickers Viscount 779 took off from Vienna for a scheduled service to Zürich and London.

During early 1960, six new-build Viscount 837s were delivered to Austrian Airlines; unlike earlier aircraft, which had been leased, these were owned by the company and quickly displaced the former. Operations expanded quickly, opting to launch domestic services for the first time on 1 May 1963. Within ten years of operations, Austrian Airlines' financial situation had improved considerably; its share capital had reportedly increased from an initial ATS 60 million to reach ATS 290 million in 1957.

=== Jet era ===
During its first decade of operation, Austrian Airlines experienced competition from Adria Airways; passengers from the Austrian provinces of Styria and Carinthia were routinely commuting to neighbouring Yugoslavia to use airports in what is now Slovenia. On 18 February 1963, Austrian Airlines ordered its first jet airliner, the Sud Aviation Caravelle, which operated in an 80-seat configuration. During 1969, the airline broke new ground with the launch of its first long-distance route to New York City in the United States (early flights were made in co-operation with Belgian Sabena with a layover in Brussels). However, the operations ceased on 31 March 1971 due to low traffic.

The Caravelle formed a core part of Austrian Airlines' fleet until 1973. Deliveries of the American-built jetliner, the McDonnell Douglas DC-9, commenced in 1971. Starting in 1971, Austrian Airlines opted to standardise its fleet. By the end of that year, the firm had permanently withdrawn all Viscounts, leaving it with an all-jet fleet. Austrian Airlines centred its new fleet around a core of nine DC-9-32s, which it would operate for short- and medium-haul flights for many years. Austrian Airlines introduced the first of five DC-9-51s, an improved model, into service during 1975.

On 13 October 1977, Austrian became the first customer for the DC-9-80, placing an initial order for eight. On 26 October 1980, the first MD-81, which was capable of longer-range flights than earlier models, made its first commercial flight with the airline, flying from Vienna to Zürich. During 1984, Austrian became the first customer for the MD-87 and played an influential role in its development. The first MD-87 entered service at the end of 1987, as did the MD-83 from 1990, while six of the airline's MD-81s were upgraded to MD-82 standards. On 26 March 1989, Austrian Airlines inaugurated its first regular long-haul route, to New York-JFK, using an Airbus A310-300 (OE-LAA), aptly named "New York".

In 1988, Austrian Airlines underwent an initial public offering on the Vienna Stock Exchange, although the majority of shares in the company remained held by the Austrian government at this time.

=== Developments from 1990 to 2008 ===
Throughout the 1990s, many airlines focused on cooperation and alliances. Swissair founded Qualiflyer, which Austrian joined early. This was also a period of quick expansion in the long-haul market, launching new flight paths to China and South Africa. During the late 1990s, Austrian Airlines developed an appetite for acquisitions; during March 1997, it bought a 35 per cent stake in Lauda Air while an 85.7 per cent shareholding in Tyrolean Airways was acquired in December of that year. Two years later, the airline wholly acquired Tyrolean Airways, making it a subsidiary. In 1999, Austrian Airlines launched the ability for customers to book flights via the Internet.

On 26 March 2000, Austrian became a member of Star Alliance. During January 2001, it acquired a majority of the shares in Lauda Air; one month later, the airline also bought all of the shares in Rheintalflug. Austrian Airlines' operating name was shortened to Austrian in September 2003; it also renamed its three constituent carriers during this rebranding. Austrian and Lauda Air merged their flight operations departments into a single unit on 1 October 2004, leaving Lauda Air solely as a brand name for charter flights. It had 6,394 employees. In March 2004, it launched its Focus East plan, expanding the airline's destinations across Central and Eastern Europe to 38; as a consequence, the Austrian Airlines Group became a market leader within this region.

Austrian Airlines adopted a stringent cost-saving policy in October 2006, eliminating over 500 jobs in 2007. Austrian Airlines cancelled several long-haul destinations, including Sydney via Kuala Lumpur, Melbourne via Singapore, Kathmandu, and Shanghai. Tyrolean Airways received the three remaining Fokker 70s. The decision also included abandoning the long-haul Airbuses, which included four Airbus A340s and four Airbus A330s, in favour of standardising the fleet with Boeing 777s and Boeing 767s. Austrian Airlines removed complimentary in-flight meals and alcoholic drinks on short-haul services, introducing a "Self Select Bistro Service", except on flights from London and any flights above 100 minutes in duration. Head office moved from Oberlaa in Vienna's Favoriten district to Vienna International Airport in 2007, whereas headquarters remained in Vienna.

Following a modest profit of €3.3 million in 2007, the financial guidance for 2008 underwent several negative changes, culminating in an expected loss of €475 million by the end of November.

=== Takeover by Lufthansa ===
In June 2008, Merrill Lynch advised the Austrian government to sell the airline to a foreign company. Interest was shown by Lufthansa, Air France–KLM, Royal Jordanian, Air China, Turkish Airlines, Aeroflot, S7 Airlines, and Singapore Airlines. Lufthansa, Air France-KLM, and S7 emerged as potential bidders.

On 13 November 2008, state holding ÖIAG announced that Lufthansa was selected. The German company was to enter Austrian Airlines' capital with a 41.6% share, for which it would pay €366,268.75. AUA CEO Alfred Ötsch and OIAG chairman Peter Michaelis were heavily criticised for revealing to Lufthansa that it had to take over the €500 million debt only when the deal had been made binding. Michaelis refused a new tendering procedure but was made a scapegoat with his shareholder rights removed, and Ötsch resigned on 29 January 2013.

The European Commission began an investigation into the acquisition on 1 July 2009, suspecting a fraudulent tendering process that had already determined everything in favour of Lufthansa. Finally, following approval from the European Commission, Lufthansa purchased Austrian Airlines during September 2009. Shares in Austrian Airlines AG were suspended on the Vienna Stock Exchange on 4 February 2010. After a time of uncertainty following the demission of appointed CEO Thierry Antinori, the arrival of Jaan Albrecht as the new CEO in 2011 signalled the beginning of a new era for the airline, with improving passenger numbers and a more strategic position within the Lufthansa framework. The completion of extension works at the Vienna International Airport will give the airline more room for expansion. In January 2012, the airline implemented a new strategy that included the addition of 11 new aircraft in the next three years, resulting in a long-term fleet renewal, with Airbus planes serving medium-haul routes and Boeings serving long-haul routes.

Despite eliminating 2,500 jobs, the company was still losing money in December 2011, prompting the revelation of a new cost-saving plan. Lufthansa refused to provide financial support. Austrians once again called for recapitalisation in March 2012. Lufthansa approved a capital increase of €140 million to address the structural deficiencies.

The Lauda Air subsidiary was merged into Austrian Airlines on 1 July 2012.

=== Operational transition to Tyrolean from 2012 ===
Tyrolean Airways, a subsidiary, took over AUA operations on 30 April 2012 after negotiations over cost-cutting measures failed. Tyrolean operated all Austrian flights after this date. However, 110 pilots and 250 flight personnel chose not to go to Tyrolean but to leave the group.

In April 2013, Austrian Airlines retired its final Boeing 737, a 737-800 variant in Lauda Air markings, as part of its fleet consolidation exercise. The airline's 11 Boeing 737s were replaced by seven Airbus A320s; it was reportedly expected to achieve annual saving of €17 million through the move to a single type. Austrian announced its return to profitability in March 2014, marking its first profit in six years. This same year, management intensified efforts to end a long-running labour dispute.

=== Merger of Austrian and Tyrolean in 2015 ===
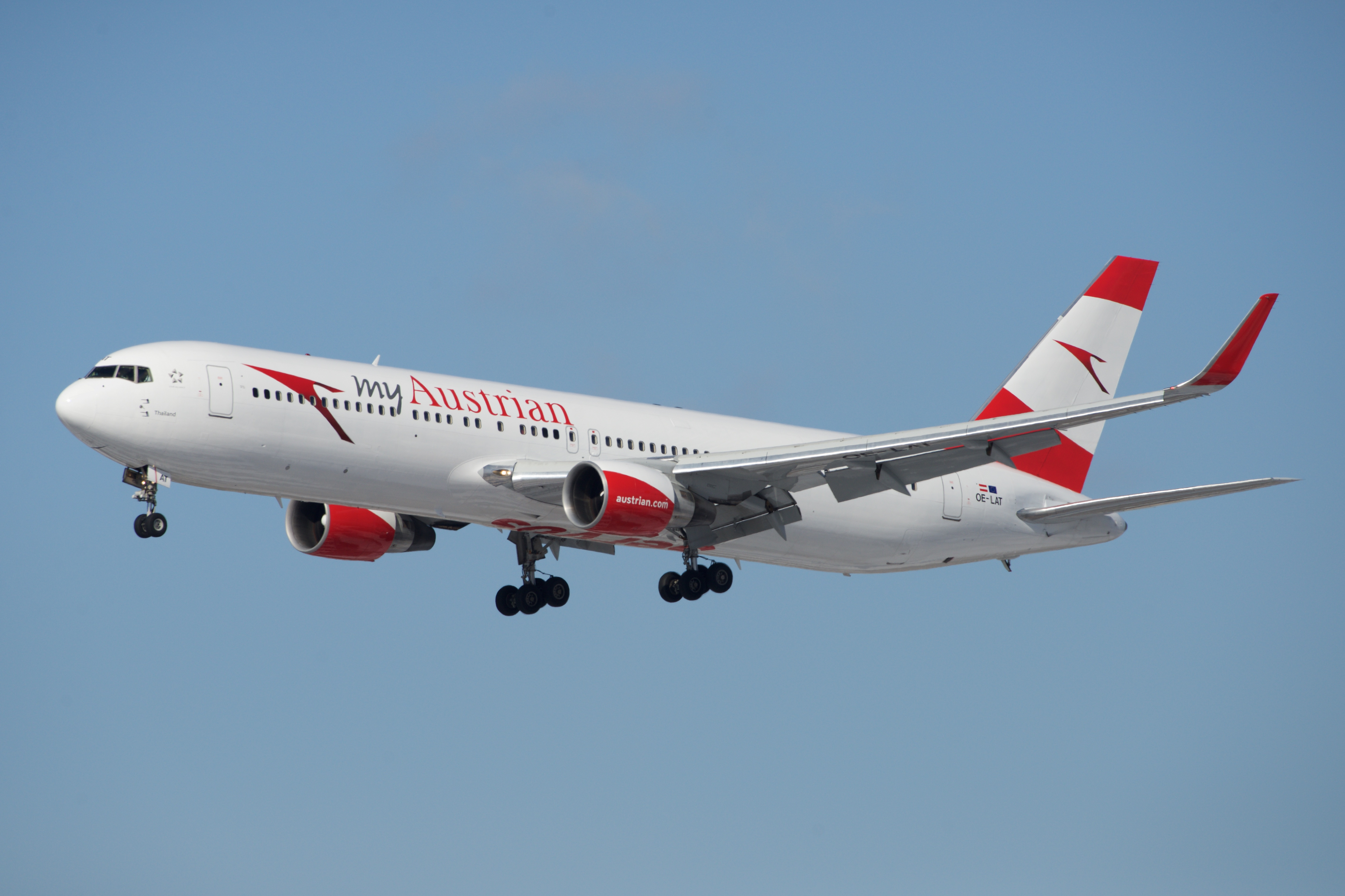
A Boeing 767-300ER wearing the 2015 "my Austrian" livery

Austrian Airlines announced in October 2014 that it would reintegrate Tyrolean's flight operations and staff by 31 March 2015. The recent negotiation of a new labour agreement led to this move.

Ahead of this merger, Austrian announced an overhauled concept, initially called "my Austrian", on 26 March 2015; it included a new corporate design, a revised aircraft livery, and several new routes. However, in January 2016, Austrian Airlines announced it would revise its new branding introduced in spring 2015 by dropping the word "my" in front of Austrian; this new feature had been severely criticised.

In June 2015, Austrian Airlines announced the purchase of 17 Embraer 195s from within the Lufthansa Group. These Embraer aircraft, which had been owned by Lufthansa CityLine, replaced the ageing Fokker 70s and 100s. By August 2016, the fleet had received eight of the 17 Embraer aircraft and nine of the 23 Fokker aircraft. By late July 2017, all of the remaining Fokker 70s had been phased out; the Fokker 100s followed by the end of the year. That same year, Austrian began offering Internet on board its short-haul and medium-haul flights for the first time.

=== 60th anniversary in 2018 ===
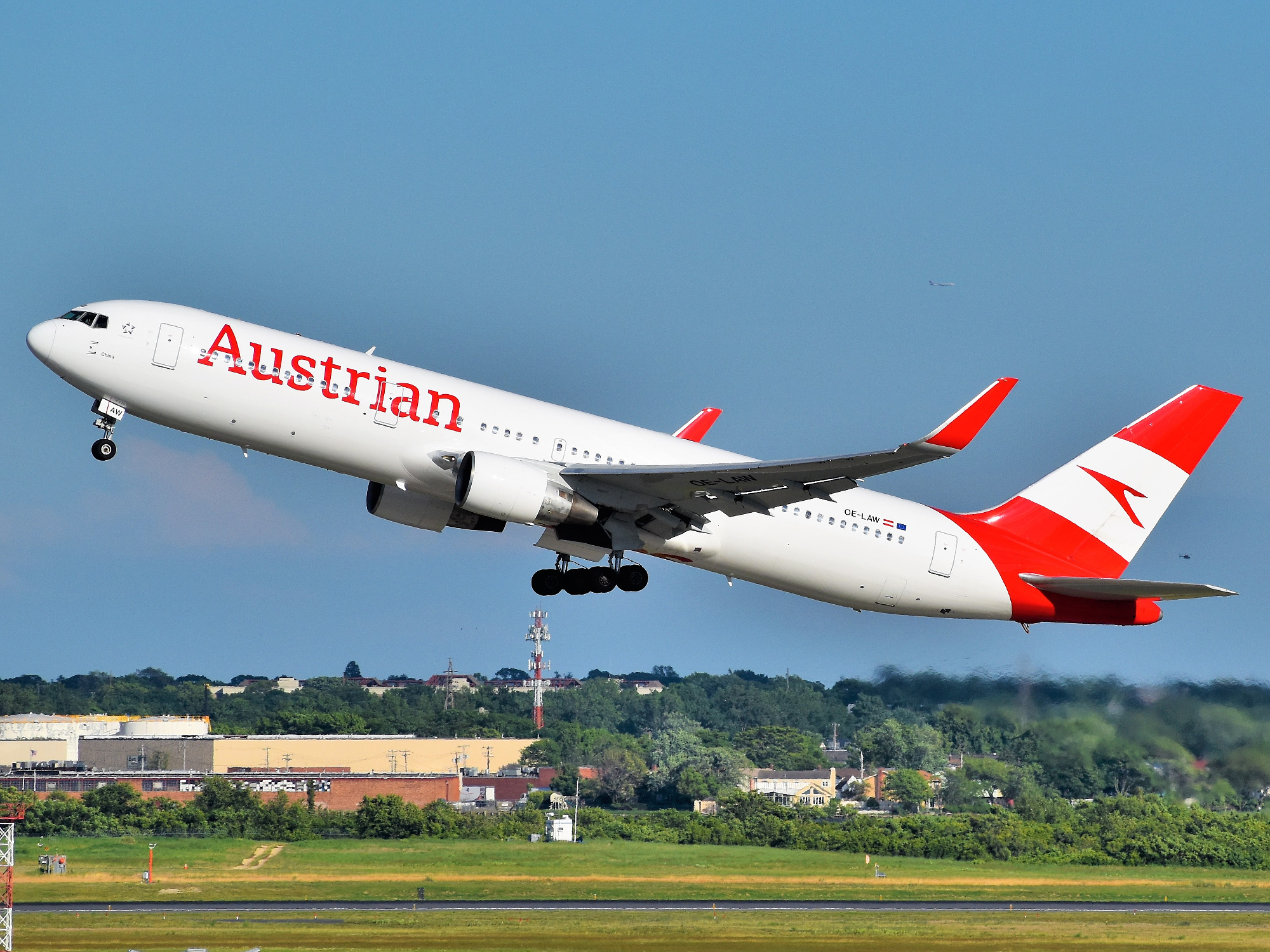
A Boeing 767-300ER wearing the latest (2018) livery departing from New York JFK

In 2018, to celebrate its 60th anniversary, Austrian Airlines launched a new brand identity including new logo, new livery, new font and more. The new identity was jointly designed by the airline and the Viennese branding agency Brainds using the Portada font to make the brand "more modern and fit for the digital future". The new brand identity was honored with the Red Dot Award in 2019.

Due to increasing competition from low-cost carriers at its Vienna base and the need to streamline operations to avoid financial losses, the airline announced restructuring its fleet and network in 2019. By March 2021, Airbus A320s replaced all Bombardier Q400 turboprop aircraft, shutting down all crew bases outside Vienna and moving all routes not passing through Vienna airport to either Lufthansa or Eurowings. In January 2020, Austrian announced the further retirement of three of its six Boeing 767-300ER.

=== Developments since the COVID-19 pandemic ===
From 18 March to 15 June 2020, Austrian Airlines officially suspended all the regularly scheduled flights as the global air traffic collapsed due to the COVID-19 pandemic. With regular operations suspended, the airline carried out several repatriation flights to carry home Austrians stranded abroad, as well as freight flights to carry medical supplies. Such flights were launched to Abuja, Bali, Lima, Mexico City, and Sydney. In the summer of 2020, the airline received €600 million in financial aid from Lufthansa and the Austrian government to help it weather the pandemic; in return, Austrian Airlines committed to, among others, reducing CO_{2} emissions in Austria by 50% by 2030. Overall, the airline ended 2020 flying 3.1 million passengers, a 79% drop from the prior year.

Austrian Airlines announced in September 2021 that it will terminate all its remaining scheduled services originating from Austrian airports outside of Vienna. These will be either cancelled or transferred to sister company Eurowings.

In the fall of 2023, Austrian was ordered by an Austrian court to stop advertising flights carried out with SAF as "CO2 neutral".

Starting in the early 2020s, Austrian embarked on a fleet modernisation program. First, in the autumn of 2022, Austrian announced an order of four new Airbus A320neo. In October of the same year, Austrian welcomed the first of the four new Airbus A320neo into the fleet, with the remaining three slated for gradual introduction until spring 2023. Austrian further announced in April 2023 that they will replace their current long-haul fleet of 3 Boeing 767-300ER and 6 Boeing 777-200ER with 10 Boeing 787-9 from early 2024 to 2028. Five of these jets will be transferred from Lufthansa, and the other five will be delivered to Austrian from the existing Lufthansa Group order. In early 2024, Austrian confirmed that the airline will receive overall 11 Boeing 787-9s, two of which were pre-owned by Bamboo Airways and were to be delivered by March 2024 with a start of scheduled operations planned for summer 2024. In summer 2025, Austrian confirmed plans for receiving a 12th 787-9 aircraft by 2028.

== Corporate affairs ==
=== Business trends ===
Austrian Airlines published full detailed accounts in their annual reports until 2008. Since Lufthansa took over, they only publish summary information, usually through press releases. Figures for years ending 31 December are:

	Turnover (€M)	Operating profit (Note: "EBIT" (Profit before interest and tax)) (€M)	Number of employees (Note: at year end)	Number of passengers (m)	Passenger load factor (%)	Number of aircraft	Notes/ references
2007	2,551	25.6	8,031	10.8	75.1	98	
2008	2,531	−312	7,914	10.7	74.4	99	
2009	2,083	−293	7,066	9.9	74.0		
2010	2,150	−64.7	5,934	10.9	76.8		
2011	2,163	−59.4	6,777	11.3	73.7	78	
2012	2,259	65	6,236	11.5	77.5	77	
2013	2,198	25	6,208	11.3	78.6	74	
2014	2,164	10	6,067	11.2	78.9	75	
2015	2,243	54	5,984	10.8	78.0	77	
2016	2,285	65	6,450	11.4	76.1	81	
2017	2,466	101	6,914	12.9	76.8	83	
2018	2,149	91	7,083	13.9	79.3	83	
2019	2,108	15	6,989	14.7	80.8	82	
2020	460	−379	6,443	3.1	61.9	79	
2021	743	−238	5,793	5.0	61.9	61	
2022	1,871	−2	5,659	11.1	79.4	63	
2023	2,346	127	6,121	13.9	81.9	66	
2024	2,457	73	6,105	14.5	81.3	68	
2025	2,541	84	6,054	14.9	81.6	67	

=== Ownership and subsidiaries ===
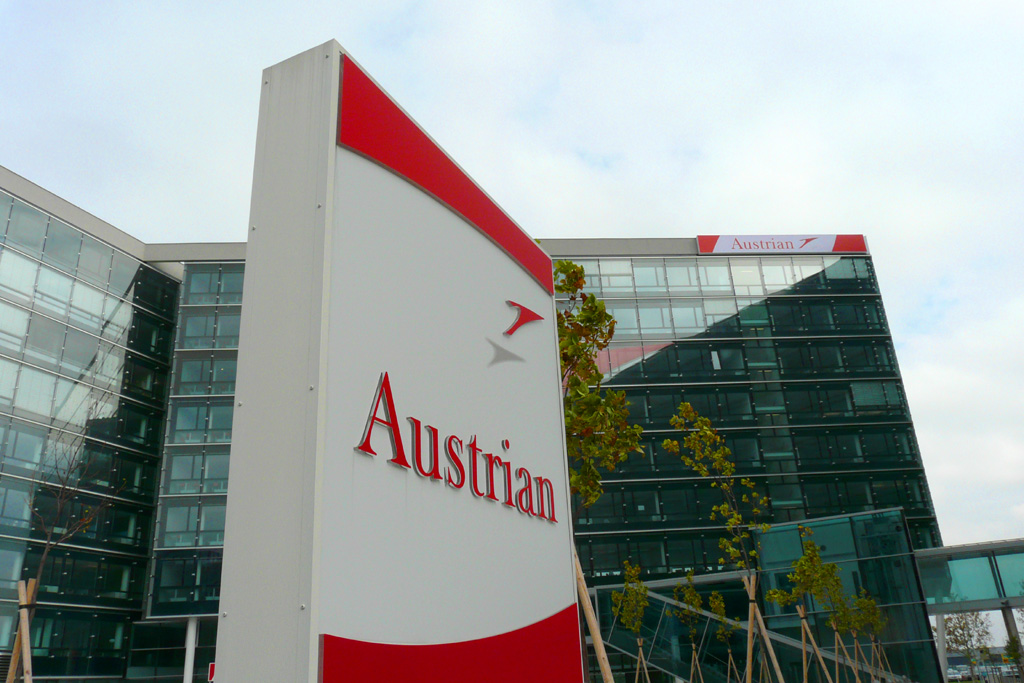
Austrian Airlines' headquarters in Office Park 2 at Vienna International Airport

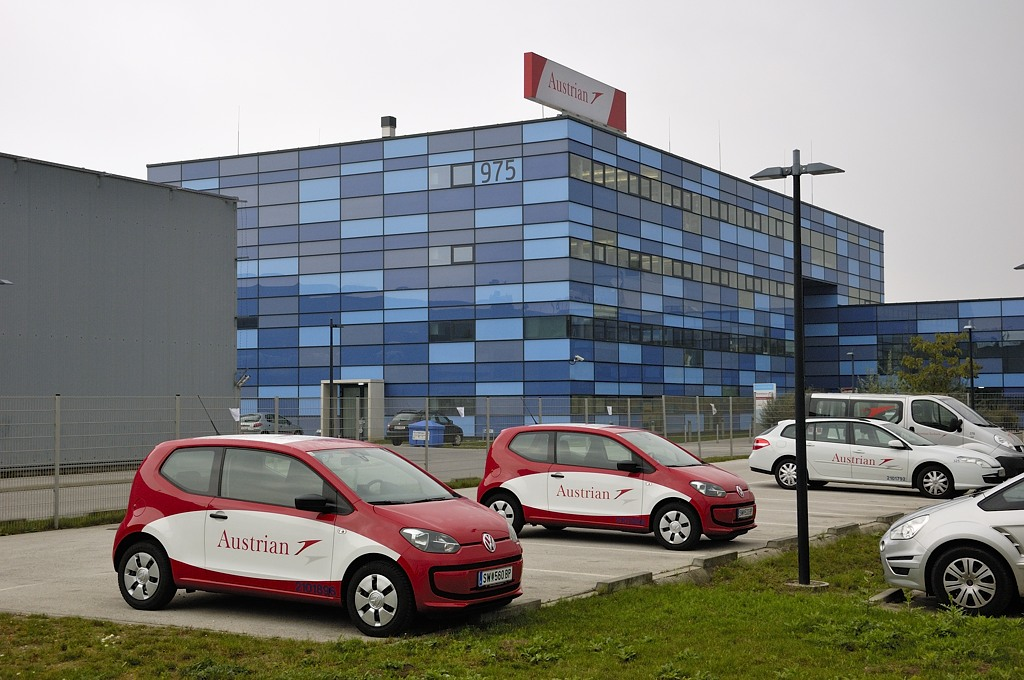
Austrian Airlines' Training Centre at Vienna International Airport

Austrian Airlines Group is wholly owned by Österreichisches Luftverkehrs Holding (ÖLH), which consists of Österreichische Luftverkehrs Privatstiftung (ÖLP), owned by ÖBB and Vienna International Airport among other shareholders, which holds 50.2% of the shares, and Österreichische Luftverkehrs-Beteiligungs-GmbH, a subsidiary of Lufthansa, which owns the remaining shares.

=== myAustrian Holidays ===
Austrian myHoliday replaced Lauda Air as Austrian Airlines' holiday brand in April 2013 and was renamed into myAustrian Holidays in mid-2015. It operates seasonal charter flights at its own risk and in co-operation with tour operators, as well as exclusive ad hoc charter flights. Austrian Airlines aircraft and crew operate all charter flights. A Do & Co board service is served on all flights. Seasonal holiday flights in 2017–18 were offered to 40 destinations in ten countries.

=== Livery ===
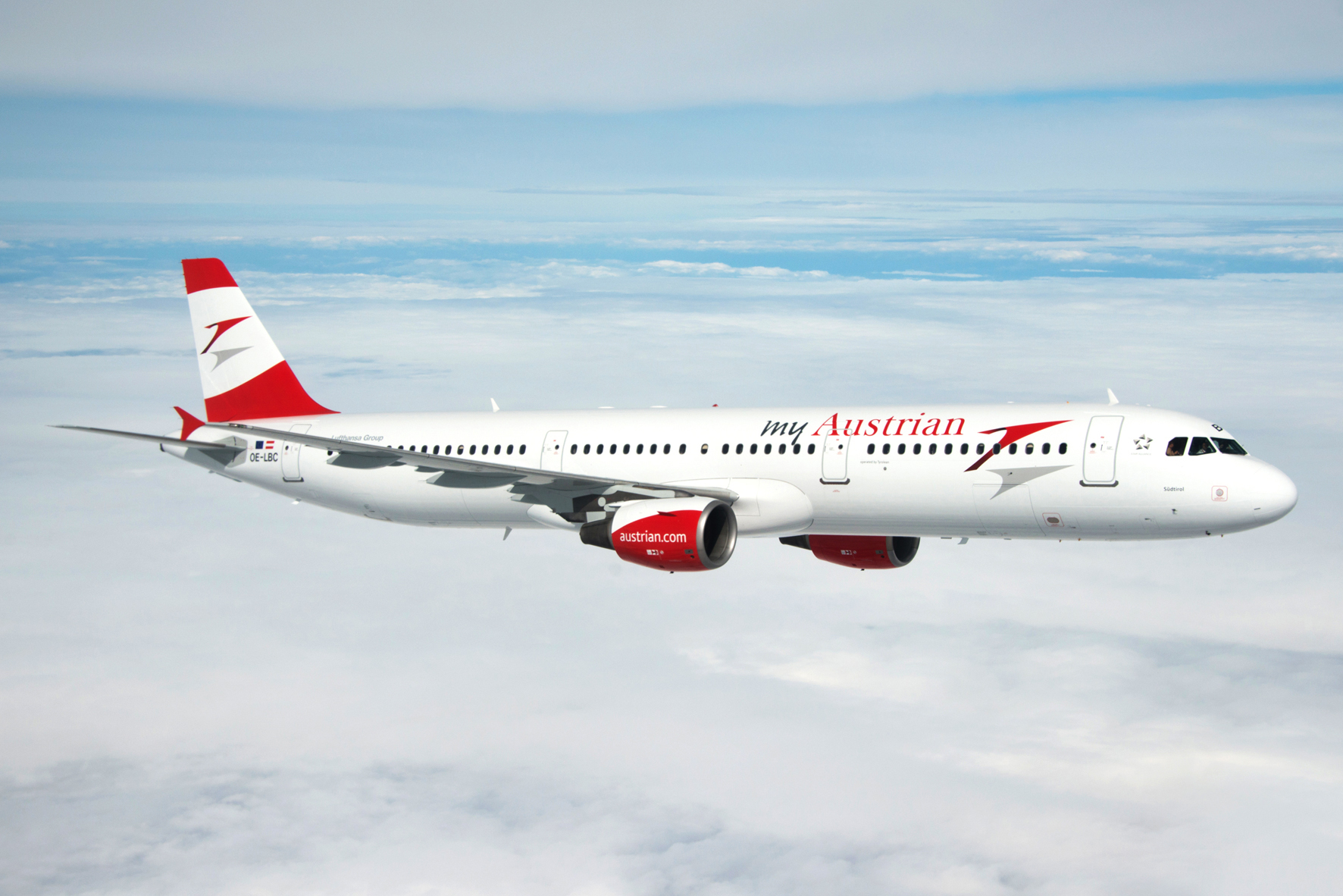
An Austrian Airbus A321 in the then new 2015 livery, showing the "my" phrase abandoned in 2016

Citing the colours of the national flag of Austria, Austrian Airlines' colour scheme has always been a pattern of red, white, and red. Aircraft bellies were silver from the 1950s to 1980s; the upper part was white with the Austrian Airlines arrow and the text "Austrian Airlines" (until 1972, again from 1995 to 2003) or "Austrian" (1972–1995, from 2003 onwards). Austrian Airlines' slogan was "the friendly airline" at the time. The 2015 rebranding replaced the livery's blue belly and engine painting with white and red.

The Austrian Airlines' arrow ("Austrian Chevron") has seen several design modifications over the years. When created in 1960, it was redolent in the shape of a flying bird; the design became more formal in 1972. In 1995, a rebranding exercise placed the "Chevron" on the red-white-red tail fin. Since 2003, the new corporate design has reintroduced the old "Chevron" shape in a more modern style, incorporating a drop shadow underneath.

Several special colour schemes have been used throughout the decades. Since joining Star Alliance, a few aeroplanes have flown with Star Alliance markings. For the Mozart year in 2006, an Airbus A320 was decorated in a Mozart design, and an Airbus A340-300 was coated with an hommage to the Vienna Philharmonic orchestra. The Tyrol advertisement gave a Boeing 737-600 a glacier look. Aeroplanes featured three designs to commemorate Euro 2008. The company celebrated its 50th anniversary by adorning an Airbus A320 with retro liveries. Austrian's slogan is "the charming way to fly".

== Destinations ==
=== Route development ===
In 2006, Austrian decided to retire its A330 and A340 fleet, which consisted of four Airbus A330-200s, two Airbus A340-200s, and two Airbus A340-300s. These aircraft were sold to TAP Air Portugal, the French Air Force, and Swiss International Air Lines respectively. As a result of having less long-haul capacity, Austrian Airlines suspended some of its long-haul flights. Flights to Shanghai (resumed 2016), Phuket, Colombo, Mauritius (resumed in 2014), Malé (resumed 2018), and Kathmandu ended in 2007.

In March 2007, the Kangaroo Route ended with the termination of both Australia routes—Melbourne via Singapore and Sydney via Kuala Lumpur. Until Turkish Airlines began scheduled service in March 2024, Austrian was the last European-based airline offering direct flights from Melbourne to Europe. It started with Lauda aircraft and later used Austrian Airlines aircraft. Austrian Airlines temporarily restarted the Vienna to Sydney route in March 2020 as part of their repatriation flights to retrieve people stranded in other countries during the COVID-19 pandemic. The flight from Vienna to Sydney was direct, whereas the return trip stopped in Penang, Malaysia, for refuelling and to take on extra cargo. Using a Boeing 777, the non-stop flight covered a distance of over 16,000 km (9,900 mi; 8,600 nmi) and lasted almost 18 hours, making it the longest flight in the history of Austrian Airlines.

Austrian was one of the few airlines to fly to post-war Iraq when it began flights to Erbil in December 2006. New flights to Mumbai began in November 2010, and Austrian resumed flights to Baghdad on 8 June 2011. On 13 January 2013, Austrian Airlines suspended flights to Tehran due to a lack of demand. Austrian Airlines resumed flights to Chicago on 17 May 2013 and launched Newark in 2014. Austrian Airlines started service to Mauritius at the beginning of the 2015 winter schedule. The expansion of the intercontinental network seems to indicate improving results for Austrian, with Lufthansa placing its confidence in the airline. Austrian Airlines began service to Mauritius and Miami in October 2015. Austrian Airlines commenced service to Los Angeles on 10 April 2017, covering a distance of over 9,877 kilometers or 6,137 miles; the flight takes about 12 hours and 30 minutes, using Boeing 777-200ER aircraft. Austrian Airlines announced it would commence service (four times a week) to Shiraz which began on 2 July 2017, with a stopover in Isfahan using Airbus A320 aircraft.

== Airline Partners ==
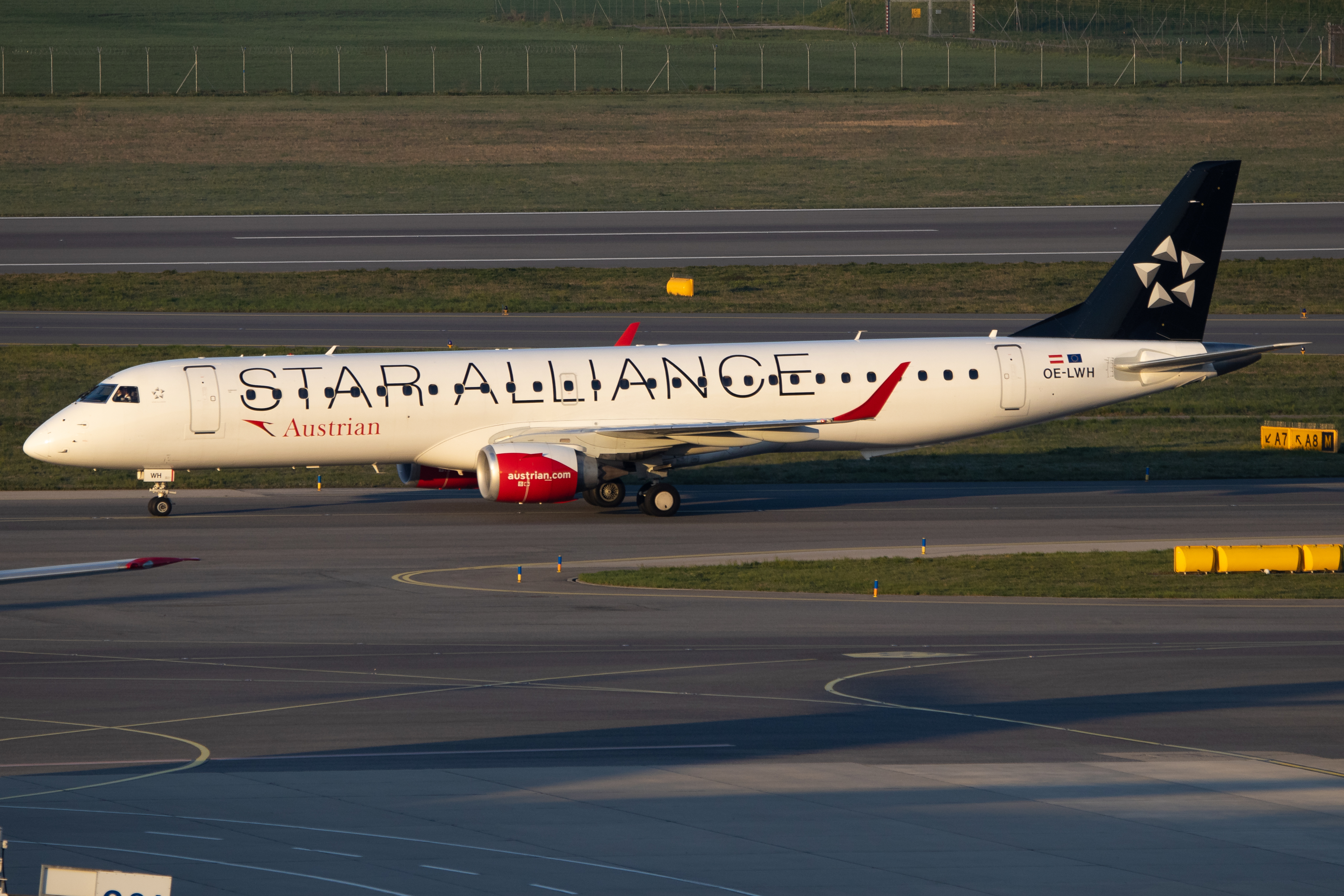
Embraer 195 in Star Alliance colors

=== Other Lufthansa Group airlines ===
Austrian is part of the Lufthansa Group, which also owns the following airlines:

- Lufthansa
- SWISS
- ITA Airways
- Brussels Airlines
- Eurowings
- Discover Airlines

=== Joint Venture agreements ===
Austrian has the following joint venture agreements:

- Atlantic Joint Venture among Air Canada, United Airlines, Austrian Airlines, Lufthansa, SWISS, Brussels Airlines and Eurowings
- Europe Singapore Pacific Joint Venture among Singapore Airlines, Austrian Airlines, Brussels Airlines, Lufthansa, and SWISS
- Europe Japan Joint Venture among All Nippon Airways, Austrian Airlines, Lufthansa and SWISS
- Europe China Joint Venture among Air China, Shenzhen Airlines, Austrian Airlines, Lufthansa, and SWISS

=== Codeshare agreements ===
Austrian Airlines codeshares with the following airlines:

- airBaltic
- Air Canada
- Air France
- Air India
- All Nippon Airways
- Asiana Airlines
- Austrian Federal Railways (railway)
- Azerbaijan Airlines
- Bangkok Airways
- Belavia
- Brussels Airlines
- Cathay Pacific
- Croatia Airlines
- Discover Airlines
- Egyptair
- Ethiopian Airlines
- Eurowings
- Georgian Airways
- ITA Airways
- KM Malta Airlines
- LATAM Brasil
- LOT Polish Airlines
- Luxair
- Scandinavian Airlines
- SunExpress
- Singapore Airlines
- TAP Air Portugal
- TAROM
- Thai Airways International
- United Airlines

=== Interline agreements ===
Austrian Airlines interlines with the following airlines:

- Scoot

== Fleet ==
=== Current fleet ===
As of July 2026, Austrian Airlines operates the following aircraft:

Austrian Airlines fleet
Aircraft	In service	Orders	Passengers					Notes
Aircraft	In service	Orders	C	W	Y	Total	Refs	Notes
Airbus A320-200	29	—	—	—	174	174		11 older aircraft to be retired and replaced by Airbus A320neo by 2028.
Airbus A320neo	7	9	—	—	180	180		5 to be transferred to Edelweiss Air by 2028 and replaced by brand-new Airbus A320neo equipped with CFM LEAP-1A engines.
Airbus A321-100	3	—	var.	—	var.	200		To be retired and replaced by Airbus A321neo by 2028.
Airbus A321-200	3	—	var.	—	var.	200		To be retired and replaced by Airbus A321neo by 2028.
Airbus A321neo	—	6	TBA					Equipped with CFM LEAP-1A engines.
Boeing 767-300ER	2	—	24	30	157	211		To be retired by 2027.
Boeing 777-200ER	6	—	32	40	258	330		To be replaced by Boeing 787-9 by 2028.
Boeing 787-9	4	3	26	21	247	294		2 were taken over from Bamboo Airways in 2024. 5 will be transferred from the Lufthansa fleet.
Embraer 195	13	—	—	—	120	120		11 aircraft to be transferred to Air Dolomiti by 2028; 4 aircraft to be sold externally from 2026.
Total	65	31						

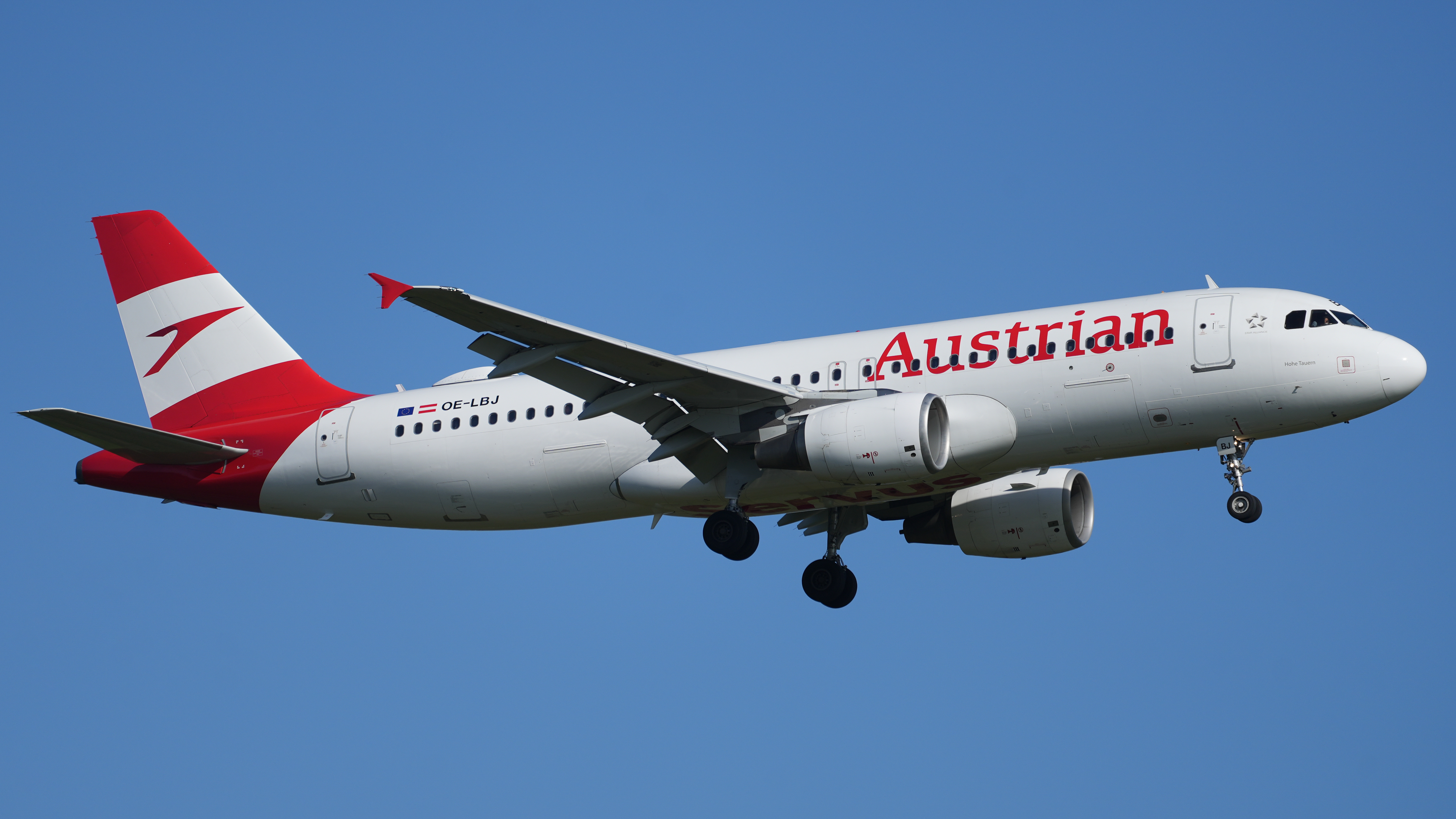
Airbus A320-200

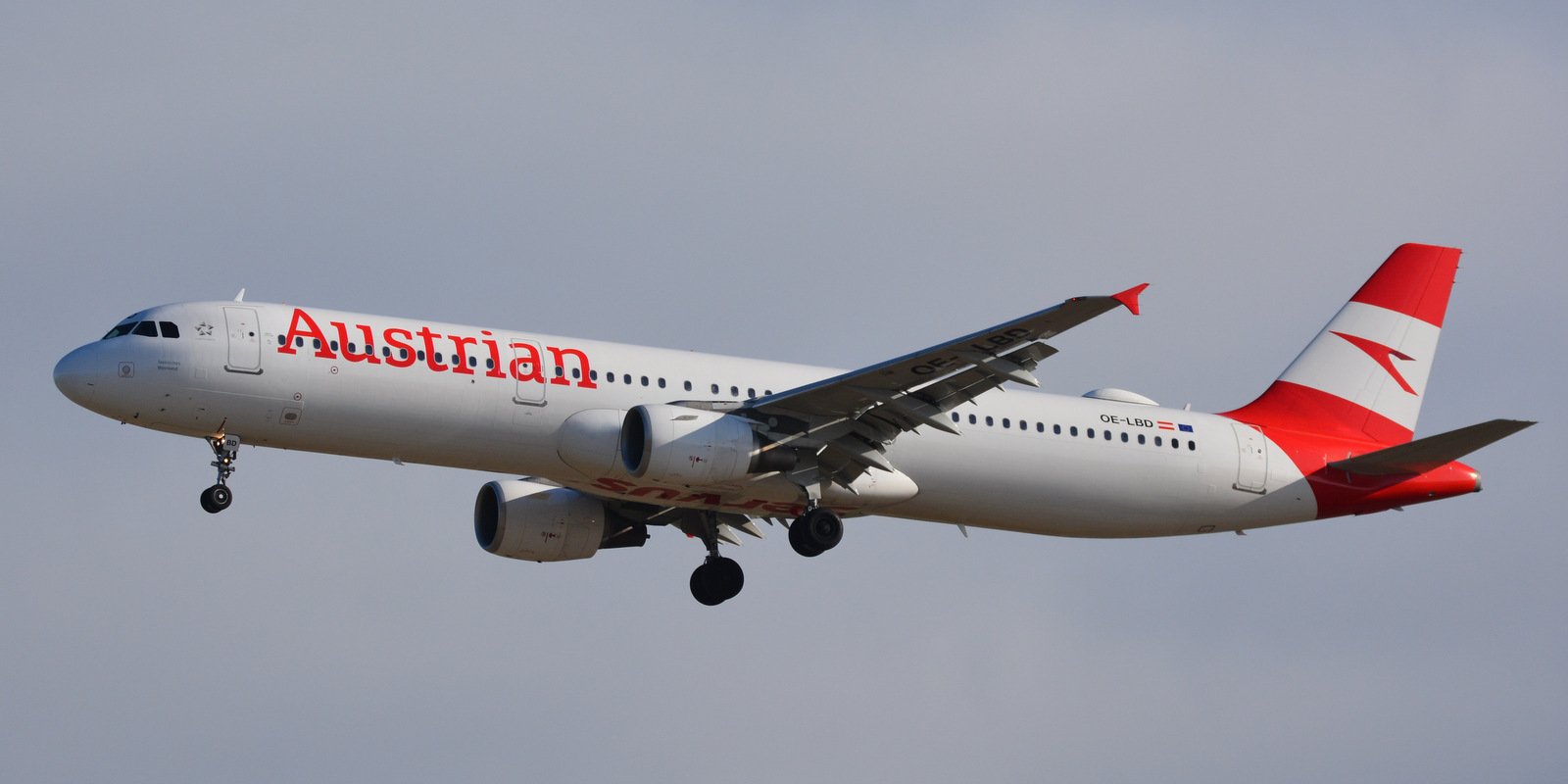
Airbus A321-200

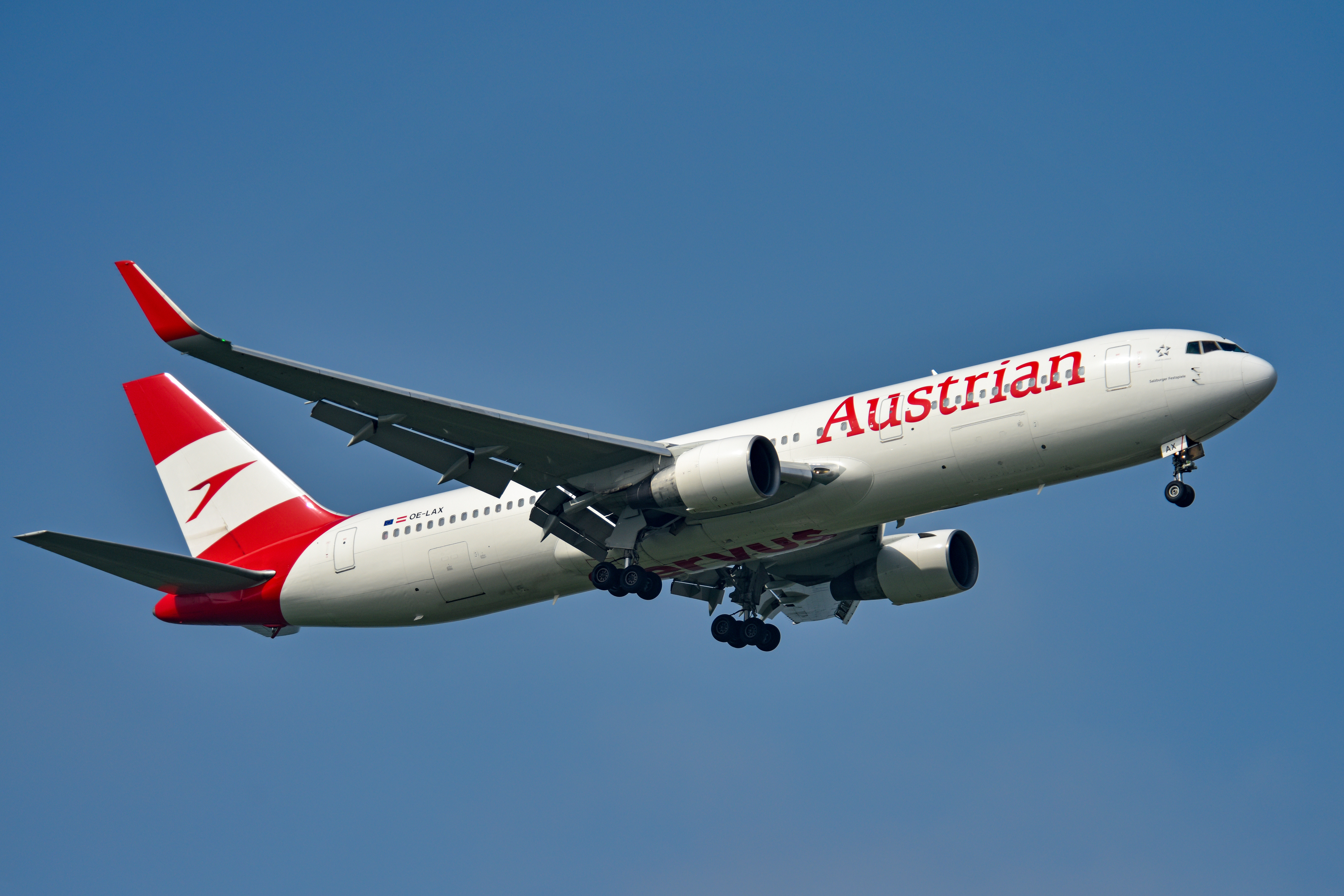
Boeing 767-300ER

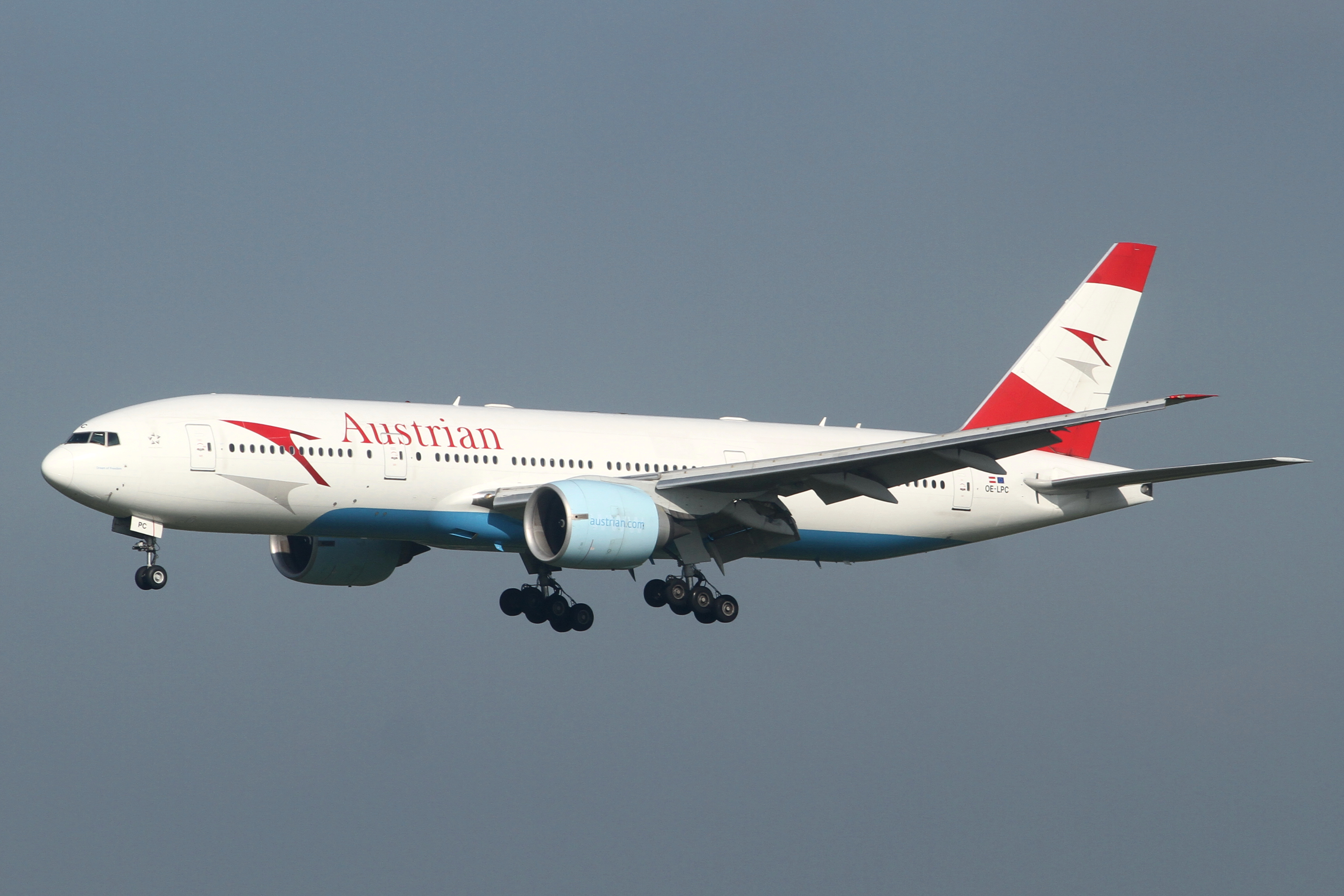
Boeing 777-200ER in an older livery

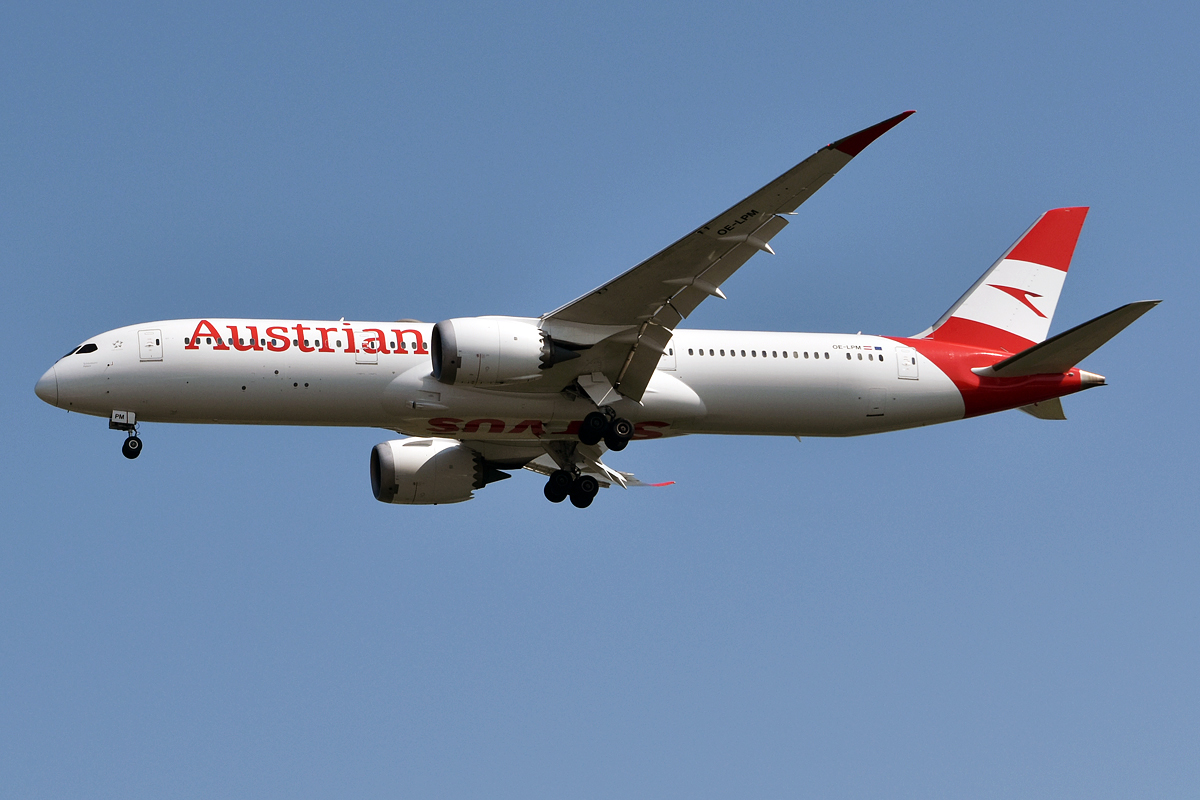
Boeing 787-9

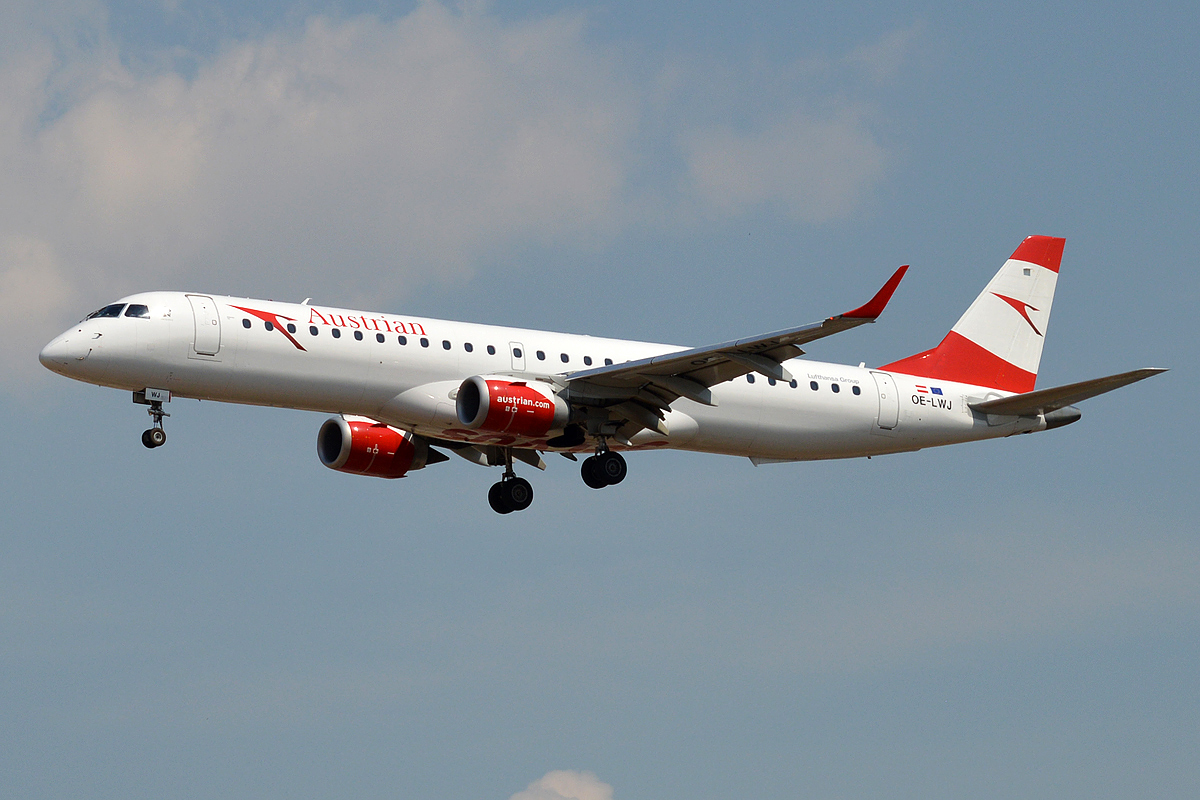
Embraer 195 in an older livery

=== Historical fleet ===
In the past, Austrian Airlines has operated the following aircraft types:

Austrian Airlines historical fleet
Aircraft	Introduced	Retired	number operated	Notes/refs
Airbus A310-300	1988	2000	4	
Airbus A319-100	2004	2022	7	Transferred to Lufthansa CityLine
Airbus A330-200	1998	2007	4	
Airbus A340-200	1995	2006	2	
Airbus A340-300	1997	2007	2	
Boeing 707-329	1969	1971	1	
Boeing 737-600	2004	2012	2	Former Lauda Air fleet
Boeing 737-700	2004	2012	2	Former Lauda Air fleet
Boeing 737-800	2004	2013	7	Former Lauda Air fleet
Bombardier CRJ100	2003	2010	17	Operated by Tyrolean Airways
Bombardier CRJ200	2003	2010	17	Operated by Tyrolean Airways
De Havilland Canada Dash 8-300	2003	2011	12	
De Havilland Canada Dash 8-400	2003	2021	18	Operated by Tyrolean Airways until 2015
Douglas DC-3	1963	1966	3	
Fokker 50	1988	1994	10	
Fokker 70	1995	2017	12	
Fokker 100	2004	2017	15	
Hawker Siddeley HS 748	1966	1969	2	
McDonnell Douglas DC-9-32	1971	1990	9	
McDonnel Douglas DC-8-63	1973	1974	1	
McDonnell Douglas DC-9-51	1975	1985	5	
McDonnell Douglas MD-81/82	1980	2005	16	MD-81 models converted to MD-82
McDonnell Douglas MD-83	—N/a	2005	16	
McDonnell Douglas MD-87	1987	2005	5	Launch customer
Swearingen SA-226TC Metro II	1979	1988	5	
Sud Aviation SE-210 Caravelle	1963	1972	5	
Vickers Viscount model 800	1960	1971	6	
Vickers Viscount model 700	1958	1963	6	

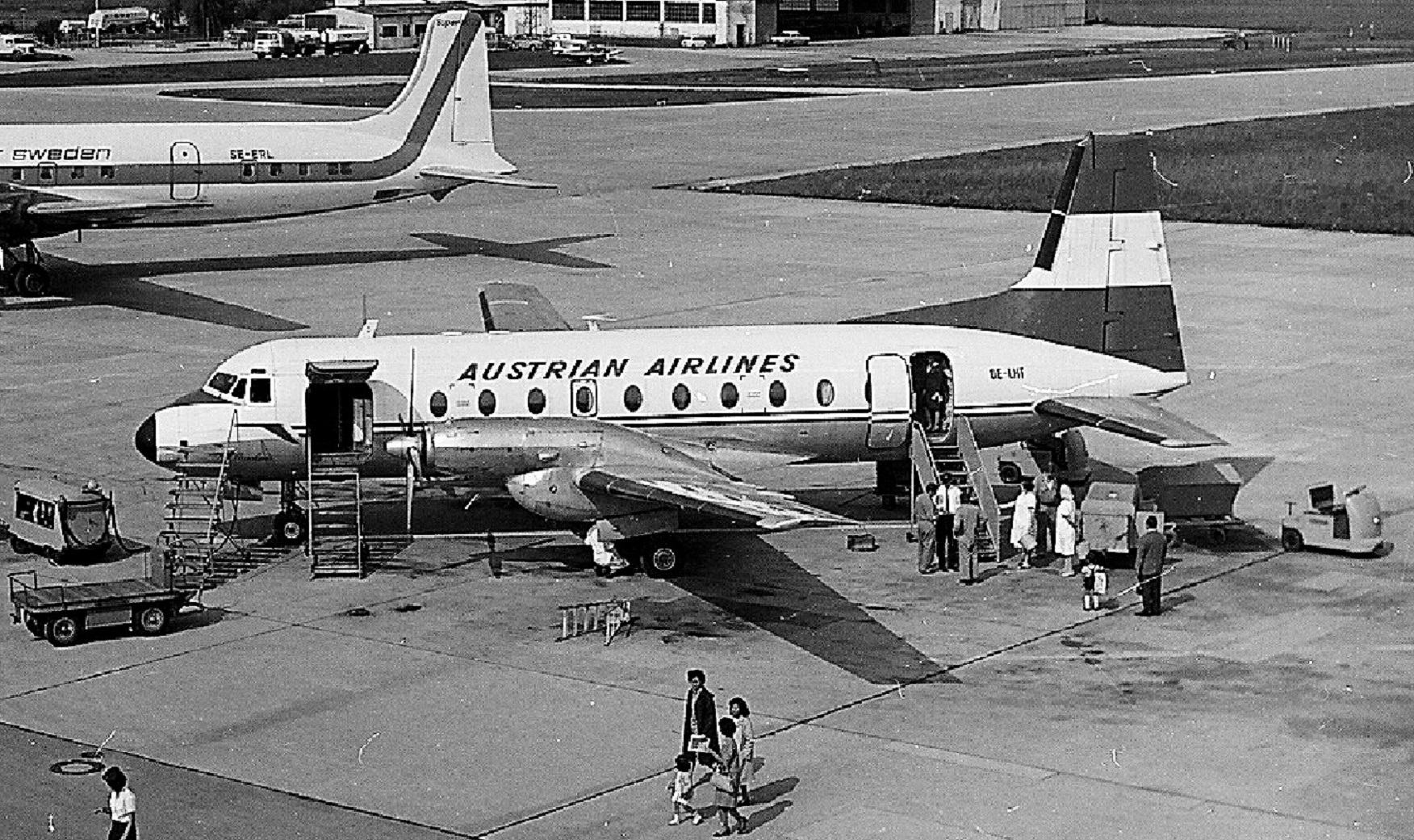
Hawker Siddeley HS 748

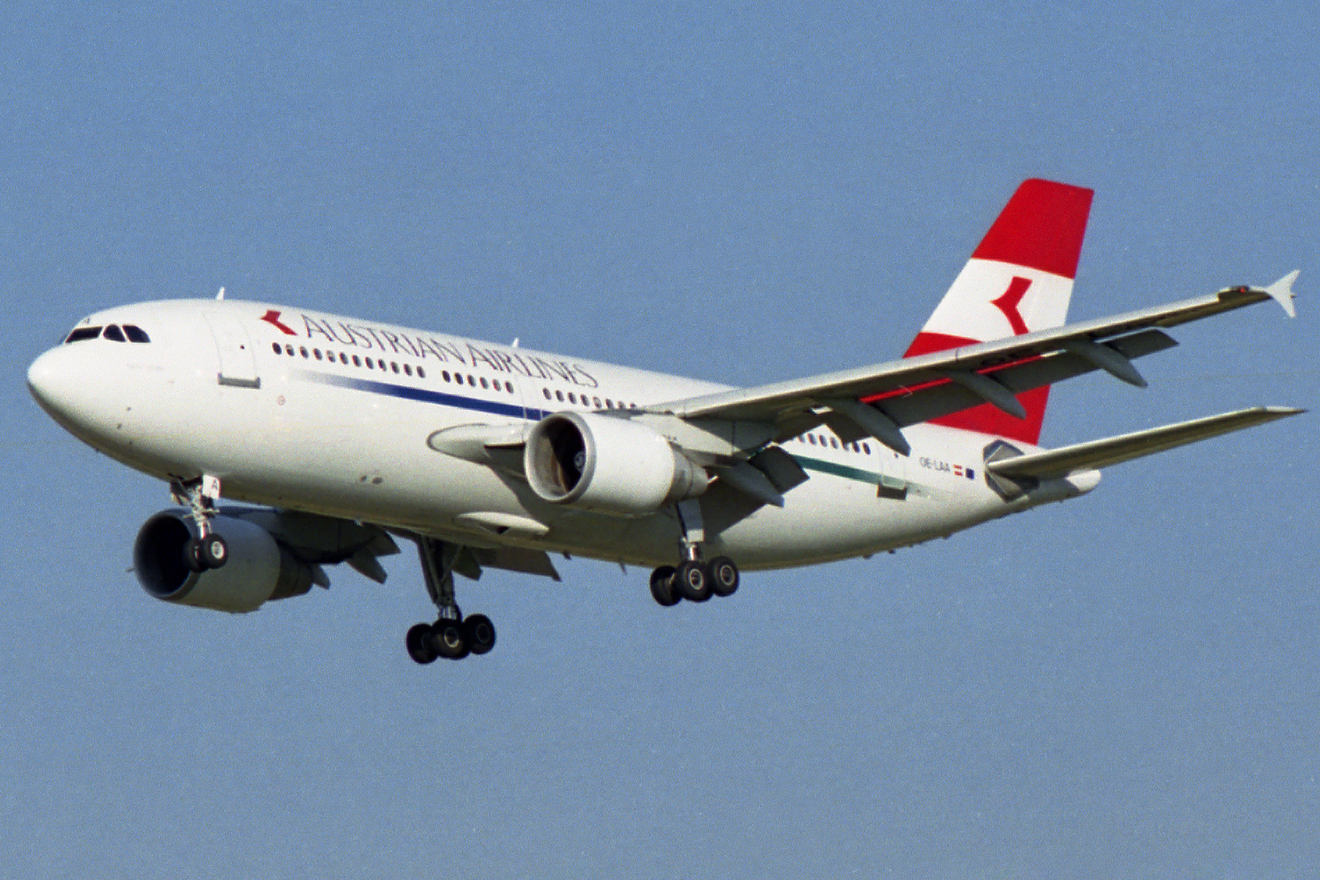
Airbus A310-300

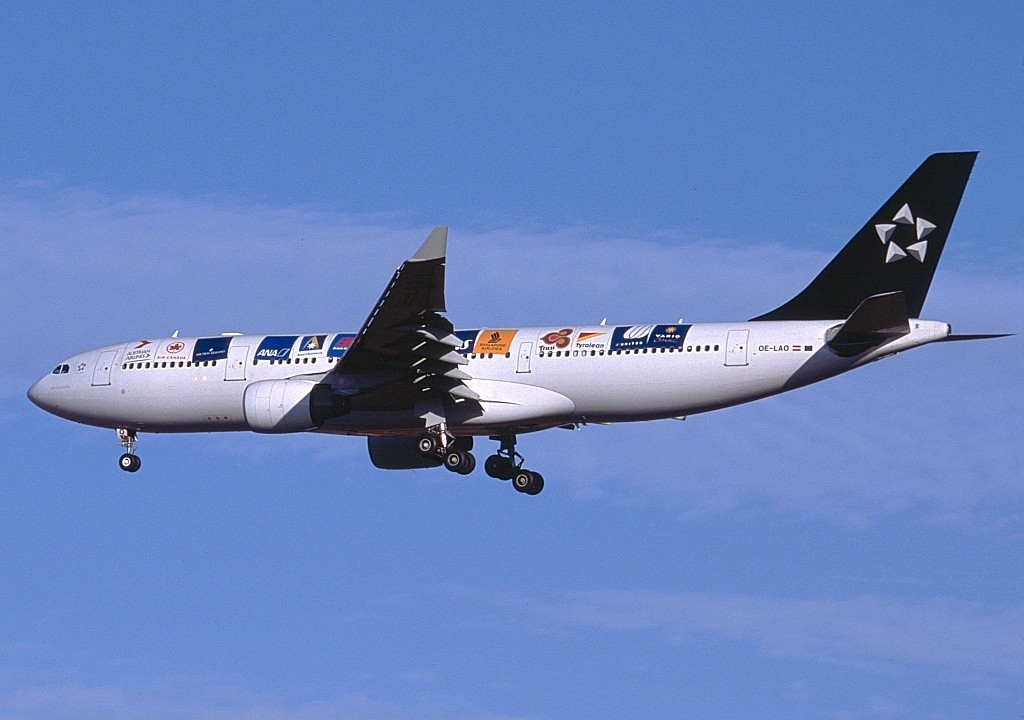
Airbus A330-200 (OE-LAO, Grossglockner) in an early Star Alliance livery

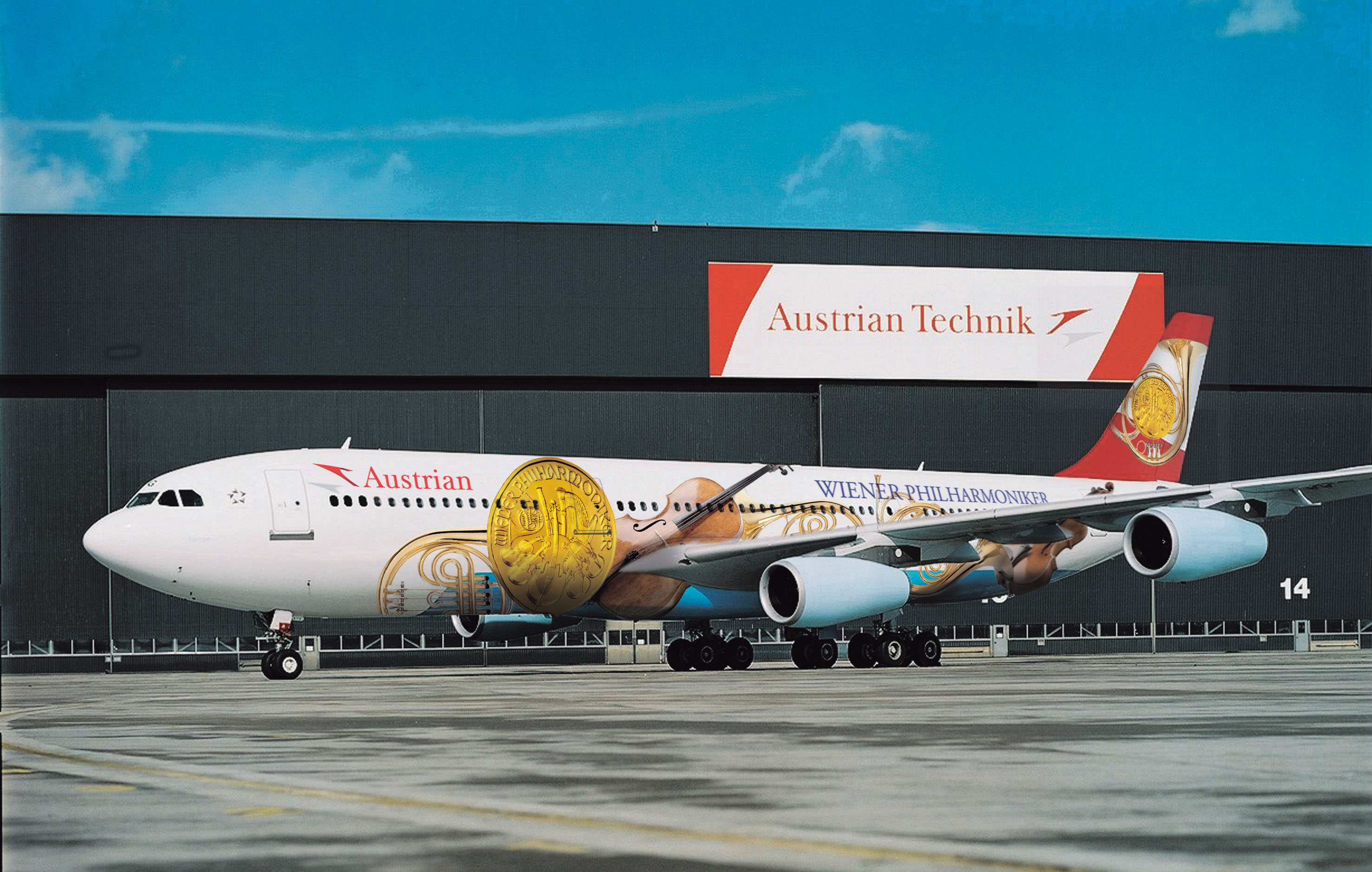
Airbus A340-300 (OE-LAL, America) wearing a Wiener Philharmoniker special livery

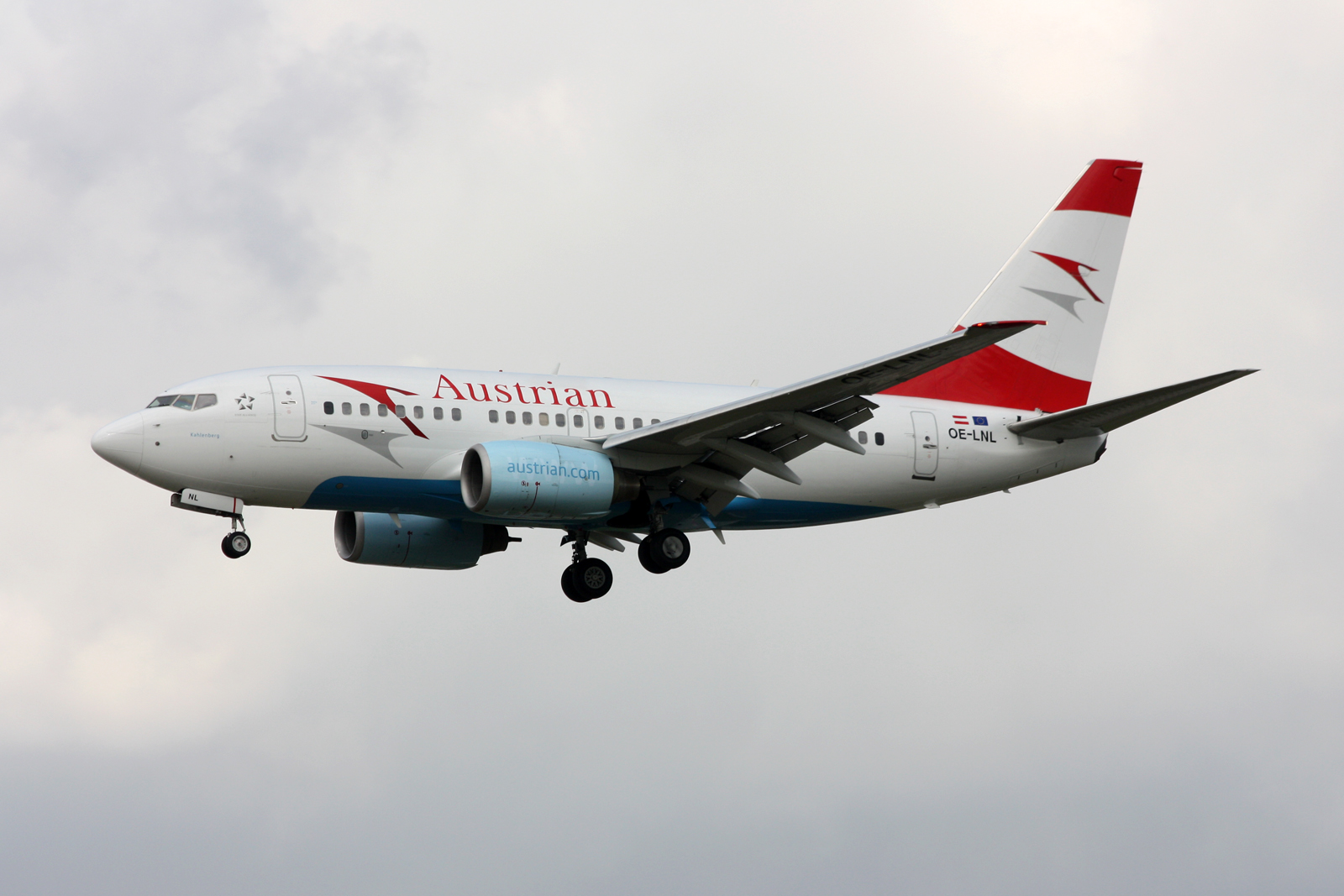
Boeing 737-600

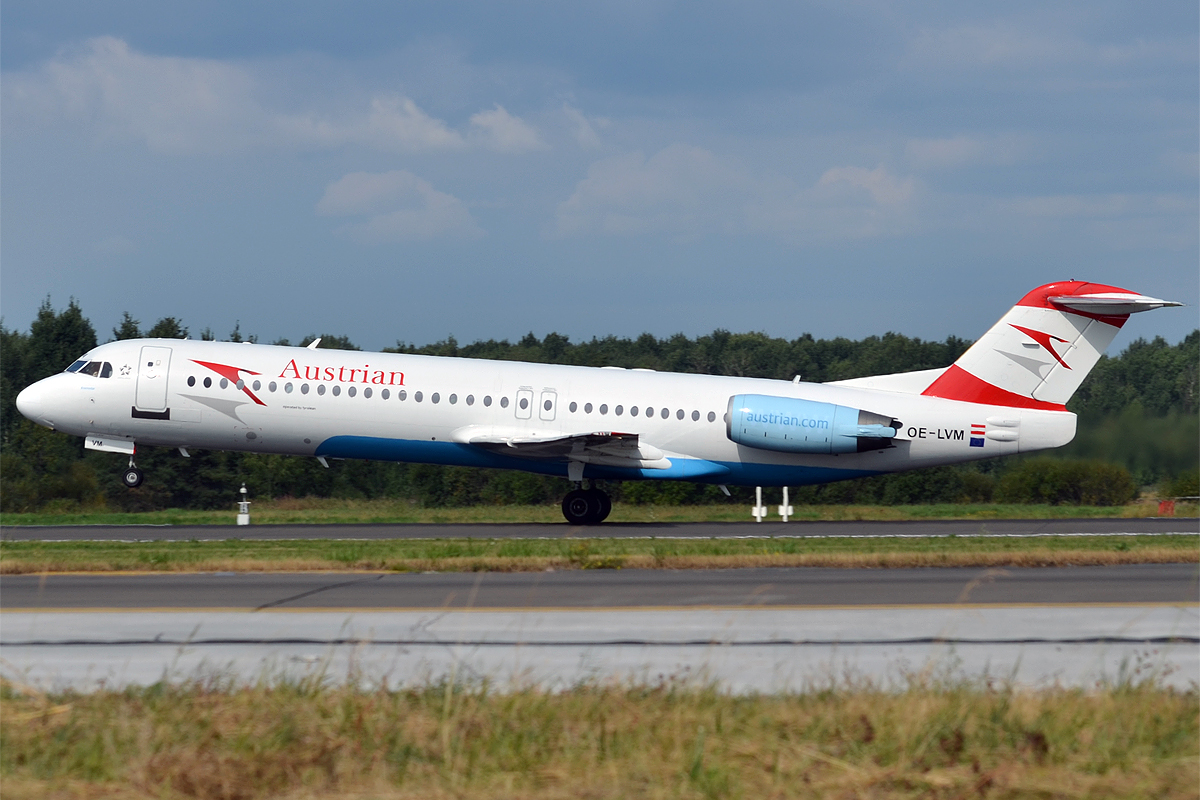
Fokker 100

== Services ==
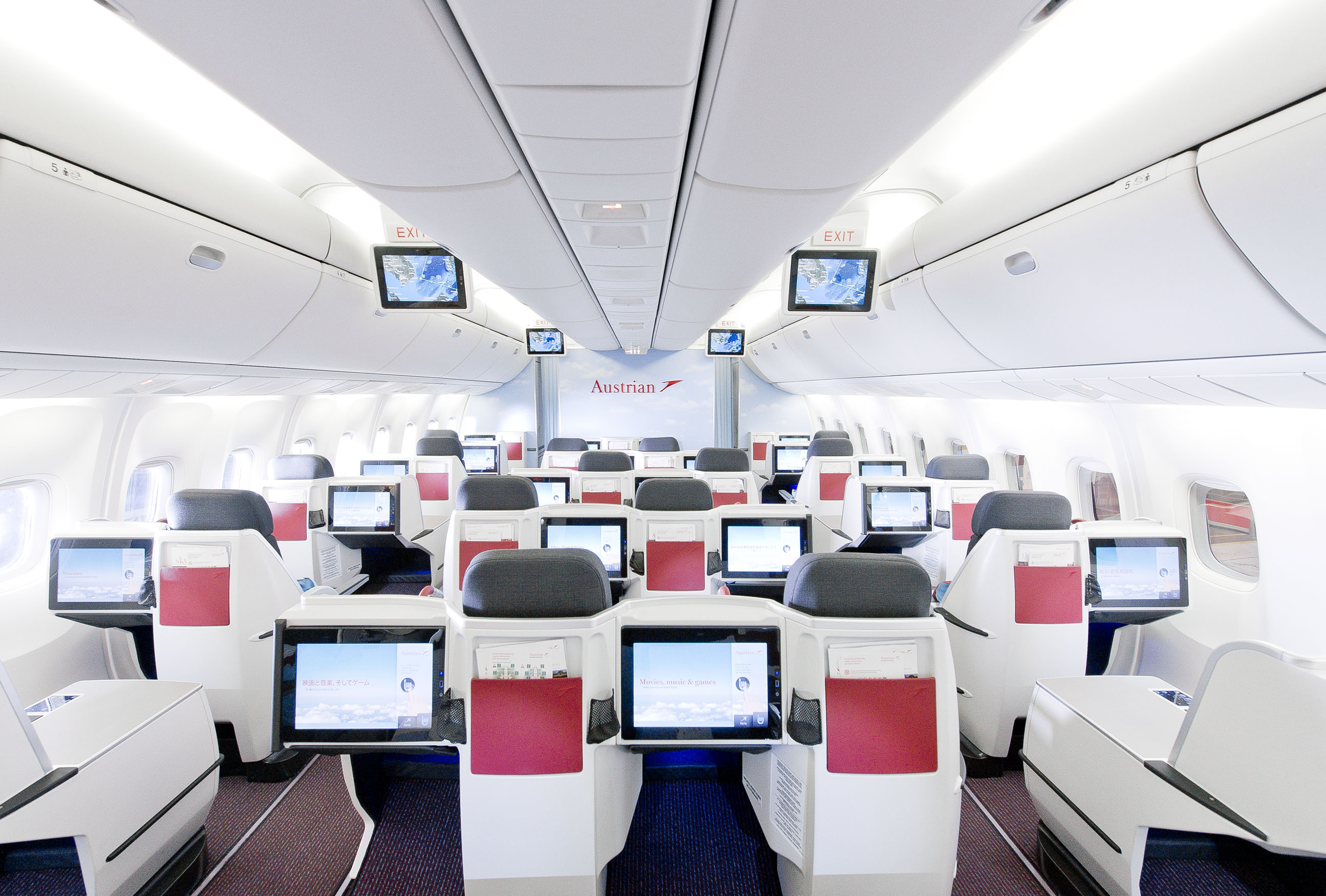
The business class cabin on one long-haul aircraft

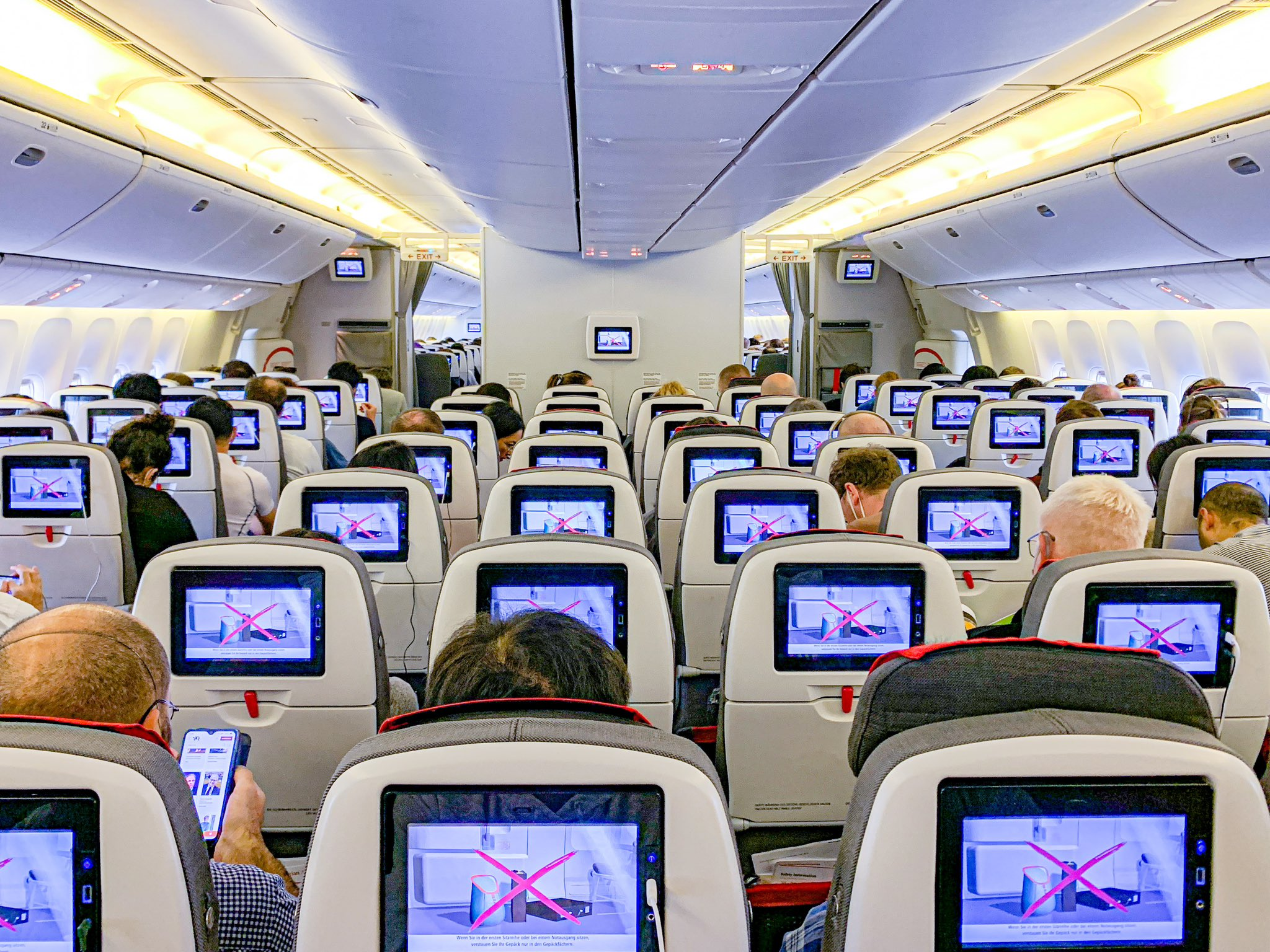
Boeing 777-200ER economy class

Austrian operates several lounges at its hub in Vienna. There are three Business, two Senator and two HON-Circle lounges.

Do & Co has handled catering for Austrian Airlines since 2007.

As of 2011, all Austrian planes of the Airbus A320 family are equipped with new seats and a new cabin design. By September 2013, Austrian's entire long-haul-fleet (Boeing 767 and Boeing 777) also got new seats and a new cabin design. It contains full-flat beds with a pneumatics system and aisle access from nearly every seat in Business Class, and new seats with video-on-demand for every passenger in Economy Class.

== Incidents and accidents ==
The following is a list of incidents and accidents involving Austrian Airlines mainline aircraft. It excludes occurrences with subsidiaries, such as Tyrolean Airways or Austrian Air Services.

- On 26 September 1960 at 21:40 local time, an Austrian Airlines Vickers Viscount (registered OE-LAF) crashed during approach of Sheremetyevo International Airport, killing 26 of the 31 passengers on board, as well as five of the six crew members. The aircraft had been operating Flight 901 from Vienna to Moscow with an intermediate stop at Warsaw. An altimeter malfunction was given as a probable cause for the only fatal accident for the airline to date.
- On 21 February 1970, a bomb explosion occurred in the cargo hold of an Austrian Airlines Sud Aviation Caravelle (registered OE-LCU) during a flight from Frankfurt to Vienna with 33 passengers and five crew on board, creating a hole in the fuselage. The pilots managed to return the aircraft safely to Frankfurt Airport. On the same day, another bomb had been planted on Swissair Flight 330, causing it to crash, killing 47 people. The Popular Front for the Liberation of Palestine claimed the responsibility for both assaults.
- On 7 January 1997, Austrian Airlines Flight 104 from Berlin to Vienna was hijacked by a Bosnian man who had forced his way into the cockpit armed with a knife (which was of a size small enough not to be banned from aeroplanes under regulations in force at the time). The pilots obeyed the perpetrator's demands to return to Berlin, so that he could negotiate with the local authorities over the renewal of his visa. Back at Berlin Tegel Airport, the McDonnell Douglas MD-87 was stormed by special police forces, and the hijacker was overpowered.
- On 5 January 2004 at 08:17 local time, an Austrian Airlines Fokker 70 (registered OE-LFO) crash-landed on a snow-covered field near Munich International Airport. The aircraft had been operating Flight 111 from Vienna to Munich, with 28 passengers and four crew on board, when its engines failed during landing descent due to icing. The aircraft was severely damaged; however, only three passengers suffered minor injuries.
- On 9 June 2024, Austrian Airlines flight 434, an Airbus A320-200 (registered as OE-LBM), flew into a thunderstorm during its final approach to Schwechat International Airport in Vienna, from Palma de Mallorca Airport in Spain. The aircraft's front nose cone was torn off by hail, and the cockpit windows were smashed. The plane arrived safely in Vienna with no injuries reported among the 179 people on board. The aircraft was repaired and returned to service.
