= Austrian Air Services =

Airline of Austria

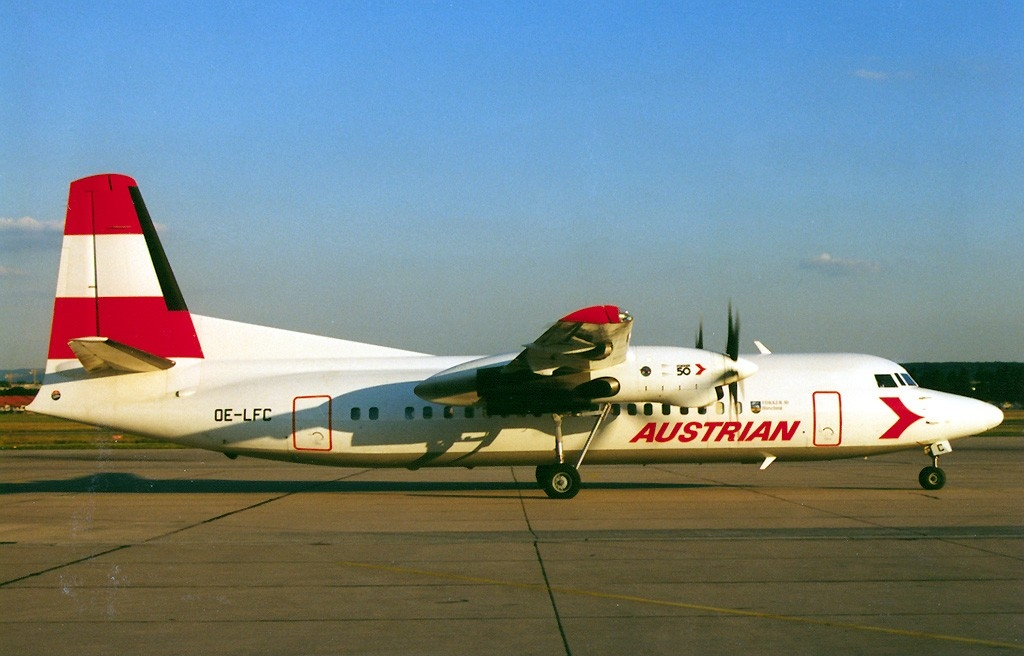
- Fokker 50
IATA	ICAO	Call sign
SO	AAS	—
- Founded: 1980
- Ceased operations: 1994
- Operating bases: Vienna International Airport
- Parent company: Austrian Airlines
- Headquarters: Vienna, Austria
- Key people: Peter Bolech; Edgar Kozak (managing director)

Austrian Air Services, officially licensed as Österreichischer Inlands- und Regionalflugdienst GesmbH (Austrian Domestic and Regional Flight Service in German), was an airline headquartered in Austria, operating domestic and regional flights on Austrian Airlines behalf.

== History ==
Austrian Air Services was founded on 4 February 1980, operating the first revenue flight on 1 April of that year. The company was originally owned by Austrian Airlines (26 percent) and the airport authorities of the five largest airports of the country (see below) with a 14.8% shareholding each,. Later it became a wholly owned subsidiary of Austrian Airlines. In 1993, 86 people worked for the airline. On 2 May 1994, Austrian Air Services was disestablished and all assets integrated in those of Tyrolean Airways.

== Destinations ==
Austrian Air Services operated scheduled flights to the following domestic destinations:

- Graz - Graz Airport
- Linz - Linz Airport
- Klagenfurt - Klagenfurt Airport
- Salzburg - Salzburg Airport
- Vienna - Vienna International Airport (base)

== Fleet ==
The initial fleet of Austrian Air Services consisted of two Fairchild Swearingen Metroliner aircraft. From 1988 onwards, the fleet was expanded with larger Fokker 50 airliners. When the airline was disestablished in 1994, its then eight aircraft of that type were acquired by Tyrolean Airways.

== Incidents ==
On 17 September 1984, an Austrian Air Services Fairchild Swearingen Metroliner (registered OE-LSA) was damaged beyond repair in a belly landing at Vienna International Airport, following the failure to deploy the landing gear. There were no reports of any notable injuries to the eight passengers and two pilots on board.
