= Tyro (disambiguation) =

Tyro is character in Greek mythology.

Tyro may also refer to:

- Tyro, a pen-name used by H. G. Wells for The Devotee of Art
- Tyro, a beginner or novice

== Places ==
- Tyro, Kansas, United States
- Tyro, Mississippi, United States
- Tyro, North Carolina, United States
- Tyro, Virginia, United States

== Other uses ==
- Tyro Payments, an Australian bank specialising in Small and Medium Enterprises (SMEs)
- Tyro Stakes, an American Thoroughbred horse race
- Tyro (Final Fantasy), the main character in Final Fantasy Record Keeper
- Theodore Tyro, a Christian saint

== See also ==
- Tyre (disambiguation)
- Tiro (disambiguation)
- Tyrol (disambiguation)
