= Tiro =

Tiro or TIRO may also refer to:

== People ==
- Marcus Tullius Tiro (died 4 BC), a slave, later freedman, of Cicero who was frequently mentioned in Cicero's letters
- Abram Onkgopotse Tiro (1945–1974), a South African student activist and black consciousness militant
- Gofaone Tiro (1991–2017), a Motswana professional footballer
- Hasan Tiro (1925–2010), founder of the Free Aceh Movement

== Places ==
- Tiro, Guinea, a town
- Tiro, Ohio, a village in Crawford County, Ohio, United States
- Tiro Afeta, a woreda in Oromia Region, Ethiopia

== Other uses ==
- Tiro language, a Niger–Congo language of Sudan
- Tirones, new recruits in the armies of the Roman Empire
- "Tiro", a song by Arca from the 2021 album "Kick II"
- Tiro de Gracia, a Chilean hip-hop group
- Tiro, also known as Kohl, an ancient eye cosmetic

== See also ==
- Tyro (disambiguation)
- Television Infrared Observation Satellite (TIROS program), American weather satellites
