= Rheintalflug =

Austrian regional airline

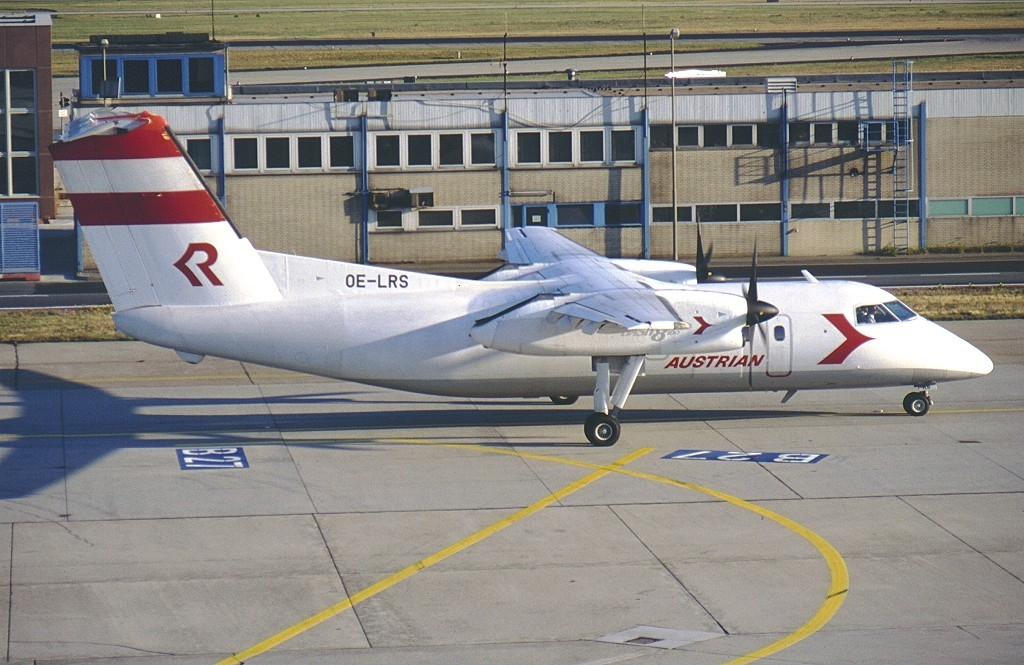
IATA	ICAO	Call sign
WE	RTL	Rheintal
- Founded: 1973
- Ceased operations: 2003 (merged into Tyrolean Airways)
- Fleet size: 8
- Key people: Rolf Seewald

Rheintalflug was an Austrian regional airline that existed from 1973 to 2003. Operating regional services it was initially an air taxi.

== History ==
The airline was founded in 1973 by Rolf Seewald which was a pilot and entrepreneur, the airline would become an air taxi which was based out of Hohenems. The airline had a desire to operate regularly scheduled flights and in 1992 added regular flights to its network.

== See also ==
List of defunct airlines of Austria
