= Tyrolean =

Tyrolean may refer to:

- Anything from Tyrol (state) (Austria), South Tyrol (Italy) or the historical County of Tyrol or region of Tyrol
- Tyrolean Zugspitze Cable Car
- Tyrolean Airways
- Tyrolean hat
- Tyrolean traverse, mountaineering manoeuvre
- Tyrolean Hound
- A type of cement render, applied by a hand-operated machine
- The South Tyrolean dialect continuum (of the German language)
