= Austrian Airlines Flight 901 =

1960 aviation accident

Coordinates: 56.0026°N 37.0960°E

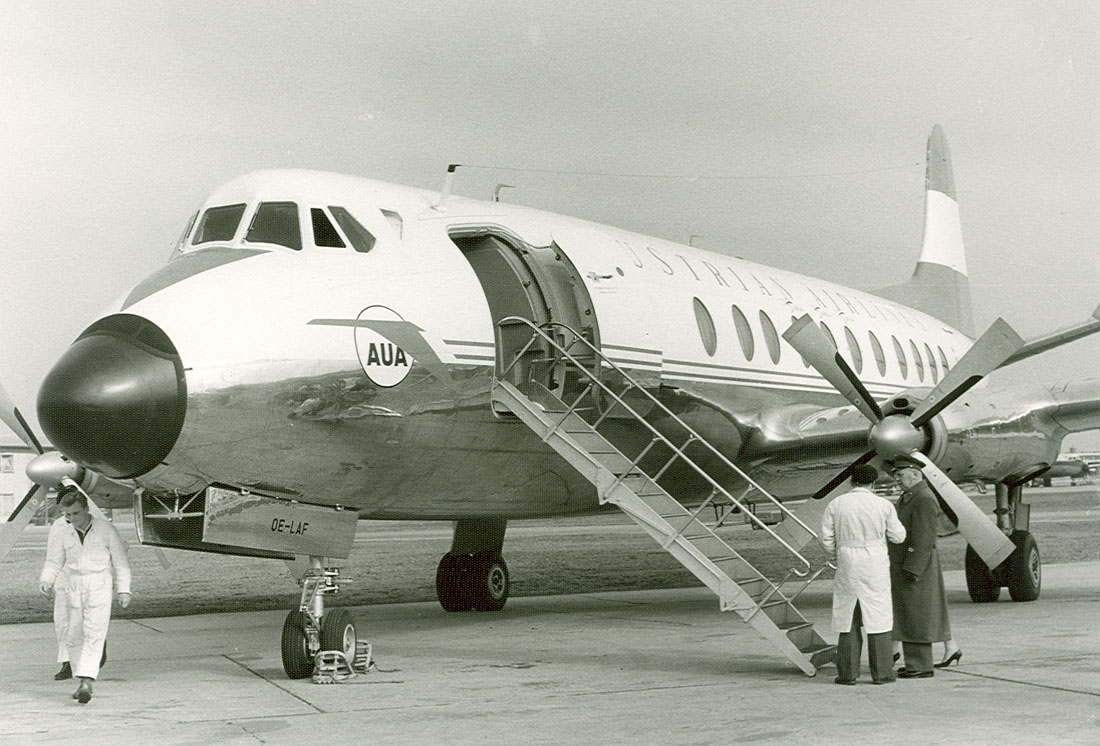
- The Vickers Viscount involved in the accident

Accident
- Date: 26 September 1960
- Summary: Crashed short of runway
- Site: 11 km (6.8 mi) W of Sheremetyevo International Airport, Soviet Union

Aircraft
- Aircraft type: Vickers 837 Viscount
- Operator: Austrian Airlines
- Registration: OE-LAF
- Flight origin: Vienna International Airport, Vienna, Austria
- Stopover: Warsaw Chopin Airport, Warsaw, Poland
- Destination: Sheremetyevo International Airport, Moscow
- Passengers: 31
- Crew: 6
- Fatalities: 31
- Survivors: 6

Austrian Airlines Flight 901 was a flight from Vienna, Austria to Moscow, USSR (now Russia) via Warsaw, Poland. On the night of 26 September 1960, the aircraft operating the flight, a Vickers Viscount, crashed near Moscow while on its approach to land, killing 31 of the 37 passengers and crew on board.

== Aircraft ==
The aircraft was a Vickers Viscount 837 four-engine turboprop airliner registered OE-LAF. The aircraft had first flown on 10 February 1960 and had been delivered new to Austrian Airlines about two weeks later, seven months before the crash.

== Accident ==
The aircraft departed Warsaw with six crew and 31 passengers on board. The flight was on approach to land on runway 07 at Sheremetyevo International Airport in the northern outskirts of Moscow when it crashed in a rural area 11 kilometres (7 mi) short of Sheremetyevo's runway near the town of Krukovo.

== Investigation ==
The investigation determined that the crew thought that the aircraft was higher than it was and that it flew into trees during its approach and crashed. Investigators found that the captain's altimeter (the left-hand altimeter) was adjusted to show a different altitude to the copilot's altimeter. The left altimeter's barometric sub-scale had been set to a pressure that would have resulted in it reading zero feet on the ground at Sheremetyevo. However, the sub-scale on the copilot's altimeter was set to a pressure that would have resulted in it reading the airport's height above mean sea level when on the ground at Sheremetyevo. This was against the airline's operating procedures, but the investigation could not determine the reason for the discrepancy.

== Sources ==
=== Bibliography ===
- Eastwood, Tony (1990). Turbo Prop Airliner Production List. The Aviation Hobby Shop. p. 321. ISBN 978-0-907178-32-3.
