= Tyrol (disambiguation) =

Tyrol or Tirol is a historical region in the Eastern Alps, divided since 1919 into Western Austria and Northern Italy.

It consists of:

- Tyrol (state), a state in Western Austria
  - East Tyrol, part of the Austrian state of Tyrol
  - North Tyrol, part of the Austrian state of Tyrol
- South Tyrol (Alto Adige), a province of Northern Italy

Together with Trentino, it forms the Tyrol–South Tyrol–Trentino Euroregion, a European Union designated entity.

Tyrol Castle, in the municipality of Tirol, seat of the Counts of Tyrol, is the origin of the name.

== Historical ==
- History of Tyrol
- County of Tyrol, a former political entity in existence until the early 20th century comprising territory in the Italian region of Trentino-Alto Adige/Südtirol and the Austrian state of Tyrol
- German Tyrol, the German-speaking area of the old County of Tyrol

== Others ==
- Tyrolean (disambiguation)
- Tirol, a village in Doclin Commune, Caraş-Severin County, Romania
- Tirol, Hoogly, West Bengal, India
- Tyrol Basin, a ski and snowboard area located in Mount Horeb, Wisconsin, USA
- Tyrol Valley, a high ice-free valley in the Asgard Range, Victoria Land, Antarctica
- Tyrolerfjord, in Greenland
- Puerto Tirol, a town in Chaco Province, Argentina
- Galen Tyrol, a fictional character from the re-imagined miniseries and television series Battlestar Galactica
- Tirol (fictional planet), the homeworld of the Robotech Masters in the anime series Robotech
- Tirol (horse), an Irish-bred, British-trained Thoroughbred racehorse and sire
- Olive Tyrol (died 1951), American politician
- Dimitrije Tirol (1793–1857), Serbian writer, linguist, geographer, and painter
- Tyrolia, a ski binding company owned by Head (company)
