= Tyrolean Airways =

Regional airline of Austria (1958–2015)

Coordinates: 47.2579°N 11.3541°E

- Bombardier Dash 8 operating for Austrian Airlines
IATA	ICAO	Call sign
VO	TYR	TYROLEAN
- Founded: 1958 (as Aircraft Innsbruck)
- Commenced operations: 1 April 1980 (as Tyrolean Airways)
- Ceased operations: 31 March 2015 (merged into Austrian Airlines)
- Hubs: Vienna
- Focus cities: Graz; Innsbruck; Salzburg
- Frequent-flyer program: Miles & More
- Alliance: Star Alliance (affiliate; 2000–2015)
- Parent company: Austrian Airlines Group (1998–2015)
- Headquarters: Innsbruck, Austria
- Key people: Klaus Froese (CEO of Tyrolean Airways); Jaan Albrecht (CEO of Austrian Airlines)
- Founders: Gernot Langes-Swarovski; Christian Schwemberger-Swarovski

Tyrolean Airways, legally Tyrolean Airways Tiroler Luftfahrt GmbH, was an Austrian regional airline based in Innsbruck with its hub at Vienna International Airport and its homebase at Innsbruck Airport. It was owned by the Lufthansa Group and was an affiliate of the Star Alliance together with its parent Austrian Airlines.

Tyrolean operated regional flights under the "Austrian Arrows" brand on behalf of Austrian Airlines from September 2003 until July 2012, when nearly all employees and the fleet of Austrian Airlines was transferred to it following a labour dispute. Following a new labour agreement, Tyrolean was merged into Austrian Airlines and dissolved as a company on 31 March 2015.

== History ==
=== Early years ===
The airline was established in 1958 as Aircraft Innsbruck by Gernot Langes-Swarovski and Christian Schwemberger-Swarovski. It adopted the title Tyrolean Airways when scheduled services began on 1 April 1980.

Tyrolean Airways was the only airline to operate Dash 7 airplanes into the steeply inclined mountain airport at Courchevel in France.

=== Development as part of Austrian Airlines ===
The airline was acquired by Austrian Airlines in March 1998 after the original majority owner, Mr Gernot Langes-Swarovski, made the company available for purchase. In 2003, as part of an effort by its parent company to consolidate its brand, the fleet was rebranded as Austrian Arrows with livery changed to match that of the Austrian Airlines Group. Airline operations, however, were still managed independently by Tyrolean from its Innsbruck base.

As of 1 July 2012, all Austrian Airlines Group flights were carried out by Tyrolean Airways. In a consolidated effort to save Austrian Airlines from bankruptcy, the Austrian Airlines CEO at the time, Jaan Albrecht merged the entire fleet and staff of the Austrian Airlines Group, approximately 460 pilots and 1,500 cabin crew, into Tyrolean. All Austrian Airlines Group flights — except for a single Boeing 777-200ER (OE-LPB) due to international traffic laws — were operated by Tyrolean, but maintained their Austrian flight numbers.

In October 2014, it was reported that Tyrolean's flight operations and staff were to be re-integrated into Austrian Airlines, as a new labour agreement had been signed. On 31 March 2015 all flight operations, crew members and aircraft were reintegrated into Austrian Airlines. Tyrolean Airways was dissolved having served as a vehicle to return Austrian Airlines to operation.

== Fleet ==
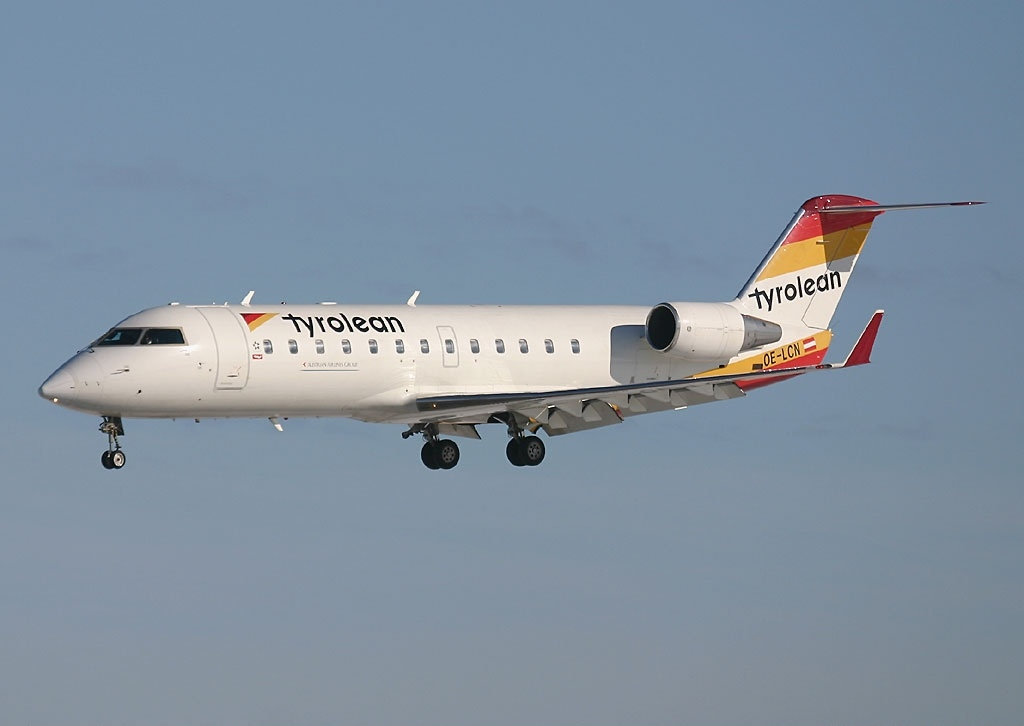
A former Tyrolean Bombardier CRJ200LR

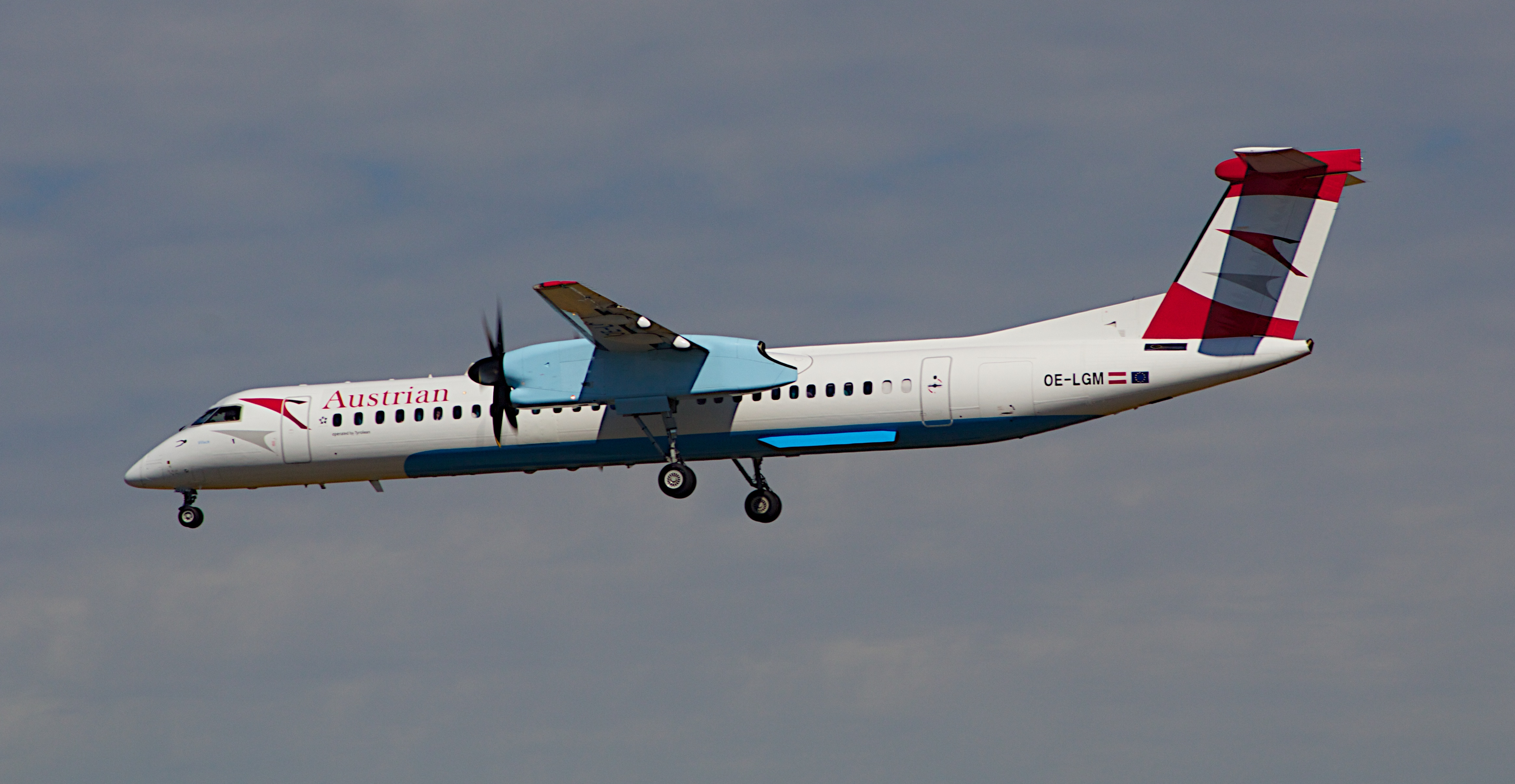
A Tyrolean De Havilland Dash 8-400

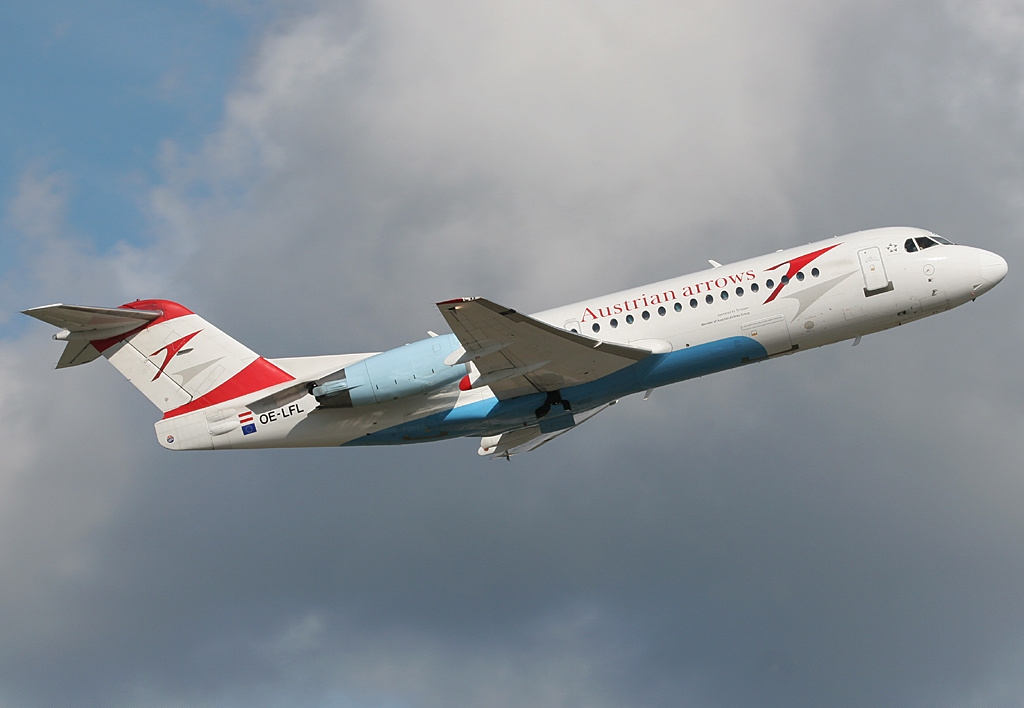
A Tyrolean Fokker 70

The Tyrolean Airways fleet included:

Tyrolean Airways fleet
Aircraft	Total	Introduced	Retired	Notes
Airbus A319-100	7	2012	2015	Operated by Austrian Airlines
Airbus A320-200	16	2012	2015	Operated by Austrian Airlines
Airbus A321-100	3	2012	2015	Operated by Austrian Airlines
Airbus A321-200	3	2012	2015	Operated by Austrian Airlines
Boeing 767-300ER	6	2012	2015	Operated by Austrian Airlines
Boeing 777-200ER	5	2012	2015	Operated by Austrian Airlines
Bombardier CRJ-100	3	1999	2003	
Bombardier CRJ-200	12	1996	2010	
De Havilland Canada Dash 7	3	1980	1996	
De Havilland Canada Dash 8-100	14	1987	2003	
De Havilland Canada Dash 8-300	22	1991	2010	
De Havilland Canada Dash 8-400	8	2000	2015	
Embraer ERJ-145	3	2002	2003	
Fokker 50	8	1994	1997	
Fokker 70	6	1995	2015	
Fokker 100	1	2004	2015	Leased from Transwede Airways
