= List of defunct airlines of Austria =

This is a list of defunct airlines from Austria.

| Airline | Image | IATA | ICAO | Callsign | Commenced operations | Ceased operations | Notes |
|---|---|---|---|---|---|---|---|
| Aero Transport | | | | | 1956 | 1963 | Operated de Havilland Dove, Vickers VC.1 Viking, Lockheed Constellation |
| Air A!ps | | A6 | LPV | ALPAV | 1999 | 2014 | Previously Aerocharter |
| Air Kärnten | | | | | 2014 | 2015 | Failed project |
| Air Salzburg | | | | | 1993 | 1996 | Operated Dornier 328 |
| Aircraft Innsbruck | | ZJ | | | 1958 | 1980 | Fixed wing operations transformed in Tyrolean Airways |
| Airlink Luftverkehrsgesellschaft | | | JAR | | 1984 | 2001 | Operated Cessna CitationJet/M2, Pilatus PC-12 |
| AlpenAir | | | LPN | | 1968 | 1992 | Operated Fokker F27, Learjet 31, Dassault Falcon 20 |
| Amadeus Air | | AM | AMU | | 1987 | 1995 | Operated Fokker F27 |
| Amerer Air | | | AMK | AMER AIR | 1995 | 2011 | Ceased airline-type operations |
| Amira Air | | | XPE | EXPERT | 2004 | 2016 | Assets used to establish Laudamotion |
| Anisec Luftfahrt | | VK | FOO | AUSTROJET | 2018 | 2020 | Renamed Level Europe |
| Austria-Flugdienst | | | | | 1958 | 1960 | In association with Deutsche Flugdienst. Operated Douglas DC-3 |
| Austrian Air Services | | SO | AAS | AIR SERVICES | 1980 | 1994 | Austrian Airlines subsidiary. Merged into Tyrolean Airways |
| Austrian Air Transport | | | AAT | AUSTRIAN CHARTER | 1964 | 2001 | Austrian Airlines subsidiary. Merged operations into Austrian Airlines in 1998 and into Lauda Air in 2001 |
| Austrian Arrows | | VO | TYR | TYROLEAN | 2003 | 2012 | Trading name of Tyrolean Airways |
| Austrojet | | | AUJ | AUSTROJET | 2006 | 2009 | |
| Avia-Consult Flugbetrieb | | | AJF | AVIACONSULTANT | 1989 | 1996 | Renamed to Jetalliance |
| B.A.C.H. Flubetriebs | | B4 | BCF | BACH | 2002 | 2002 | Operated Cessna Conquest |
| Bannert Air | | | BBA | BNAIR | 1998 | 1998 | Operated IAI 1125 Astra, Cessna Citation II |
| Business Flight Salzburg | | | AUJ | AUSTROJET | 2000 | 2010 | Operated Bell Jet Ranger |
| Charter Air | | | CHW | CHARTER WIEN | 2004 | 2006 | Operated Fairchild Swearingen Metroliner |
| City-Jet Luftfahrt | | | CIT | CITY VIENNA | 1993 | 1996 | Operated Cessna 500, Cessna 550, Cessna 650, Dassault Falcon 20 |
| Common Sky | | AQ | AUN | MAPJET | 2002 | 2012 | Previously MAPJet |
| Comtel Air | | | COE | COMTEL AIR | 1988 | 2011 | |
| Eagle Airlines | | ZN | EAV | MAYFLOWER | 2001 | 2002 | |
| Easy Aviation | | | | | 2008 | 2013 | Operated Dornier 328 |
| Europ Star Aircraft | | | ESQ | EUROP STAR | 2003 | 2017 | Operated Challenger 600, Cessna Citation, Embraer ERJ-135 |
| Fairline | | | | FAIRLINE | 2003 | 2004 | |
| flyNiki | | HG | AYP | FLYNIKI | 2003 | 2017 | Previously Niki |
| InterSky | | 3L | ISK | INTERSKY | 2002 | 2015 | |
| Jetalliance | | | JAG | JETALLIANCE | 1996 | 2013 | |
| Jetfly Airlines | | | JFL | BLUE DANUBE | 1997 | 2009 | Operated Cessna 550, Cessna 560 |
| Knaus Helicopter | | | | | 1992 | 2007 | Founded by Johann Knaus. Established as Ritter Trade & Aviation Consulting in 1984. Operated Eurocopter AS355 Écureuil 2, Bell 204, Bell 205, MD 520N |
| Lauda | | OE | LDM | LAUDA MOTION | 2019 | 2020 | Trading name of LaudaMotion |
| Lauda Air | | NG | LDA | AUSTRIAN | 1979 | 2012 | Merged operations with Austrian Airlines in 2005. Merged into Austrian Airlines in 2012. Renamed Austrian myHoliday |
| LaudaMotion | | OE | LDM | EXPERT | 2016 | 2018 | |
| Level Europe | | VK | FOO | AUSTROJET | 2020 | 2020 | |
| LTU Austria | | L3 | LTO | BILLA TRANSPORT | 2004 | 2008 | Single aircraft transferred to LTU International |
| Luxe Aviation | | | LAV | | 2007 | 2008 | Operated Embraer ERJ-135 |
| Magna Air | | | MGR | MAGNA AIR | 1996 | 2001 | Operated Cessna 525, Dassault Falcon 900. Renamed Jet 2000. |
| Montana Austria | | OF | | | 1976 | 1981 | |
| Niki | | HG | NLY | FLYNIKI | 2003 | | Rebranded flyNiki |
| Österreichische Luftverkehrs | | | | | 1923 | 1939 | see Austrian Airlines entry |
| People's Viennaline | | PE | PEV | PEOPLES | 2011 | 2018 | Rebranded as People's. Operated Embraer EMB 170 |
| Rheintalflug | | | RTL | RHEINTAL | 1973 | 2002 | Merged operations into Tyrolean Airways |
| Robin Hood Aviation | | RH | RHA | SHERWOOD | 2007 | 2011 | |
| Salzburg Airlines | | | LFU | UNIFOX | 1992 | 1994 | Operated Swearingen Merlin IV |
| Skytaxi (Austria) | | | STC | AIR JET | 2007 | 2017 | Operated Cessna Citation Mustang |
| Smartline | | | | | 2007 | 2007 | |
| Styrian Spirit | | Z2 | STY | STYRIAN | 2003 | 2006 | |
| Teamline Air | | L9 | TLW | TEAMLINE | 2001 | 2004 | |
| Tyrolean Air Ambulance | | | TYW | TYROL AMBULANCE | 1976 | 2000 | Renamed to Tyrol Air Ambulance |
| Tyrolean Airways | | VO | TYR | TYROLEAN | 1980 | 2015 | Originated from Aircraft Innsbruck fixed wing operations. Merged into Austrian Airlines |
| ULL 14 | | | ULL | | 2002 | 2008 | |
| Viennair Luftfahrtges | | | | | 1968 | 1971 | Established as Zwoboda Aviation in 1964. Operated Piper Navajo |
| Welcome Air | | 2W | WLC | WELCOMEAIR | 2000 | 2017 | |
| X-Jet | | | KJE | | 2015 | 2017 | Operated Cessna Citation Bravo |

== See also ==
- List of airlines of Austria
- List of airports in Austria
