= List of airlines of Austria =

This is a list of airlines which have an Air Operator Certificate issued by the Civil Aviation Authority of Austria.

== Scheduled airlines ==
Airline	IATA	ICAO	Image	Callsign	Commenced operations	Hub airport(s)	Notes
Austrian Airlines	OS	AUA		AUSTRIAN	1958	Vienna International Airport	Flag carrier
easyJet Europe	EC	EJU		ALPINE	2017	Vienna International Airport	Low-cost airline
People's	PE	PEV		PEOPLES	2011	St. Gallen–Altenrhein Airport	Regional airline

== Charter airlines ==
Airline	IATA	ICAO	Image	Callsign	Commenced operations	Hub airport(s)	Notes
Air X Executive Jets						Salzburg Airport	
Airlink (Austria)		JAR		AIRLINK		Salzburg Airport	
ALPI Jets		ALX		ALPIJETS		Vienna International Airport	
Avcon Jet		AOJ		ASTERIX		Vienna International Airport	
Global Jet Austria		GLJ		GLOBAL AUSTRIA		Vienna International Airport	
GlobeAir		GAC		DREAM TEAM		Linz Airport	
Grossmann Air Service		HTG		GROSSMANN	1991		
MJET		MJF	Gulfstream G200 exterior	EM-EXPRESS		Vienna International Airport, Zurich Airport	
Pink Sparrow		SZG	Airport-Vienna 1746	SPARROW		Salzburg Airport, Linz Airport, Vienna Airport	
Tyrolean Jet Services		TJS		TYROLJET			

== See also ==
- List of airports in Austria
- List of defunct airlines of Austria
- List of airlines
