= Maribor Edvard Rusjan Airport =

Airport in Maribor, Slovenia

Maribor Edvard Rusjan Airport Letališče Edvarda Rusjana Maribor
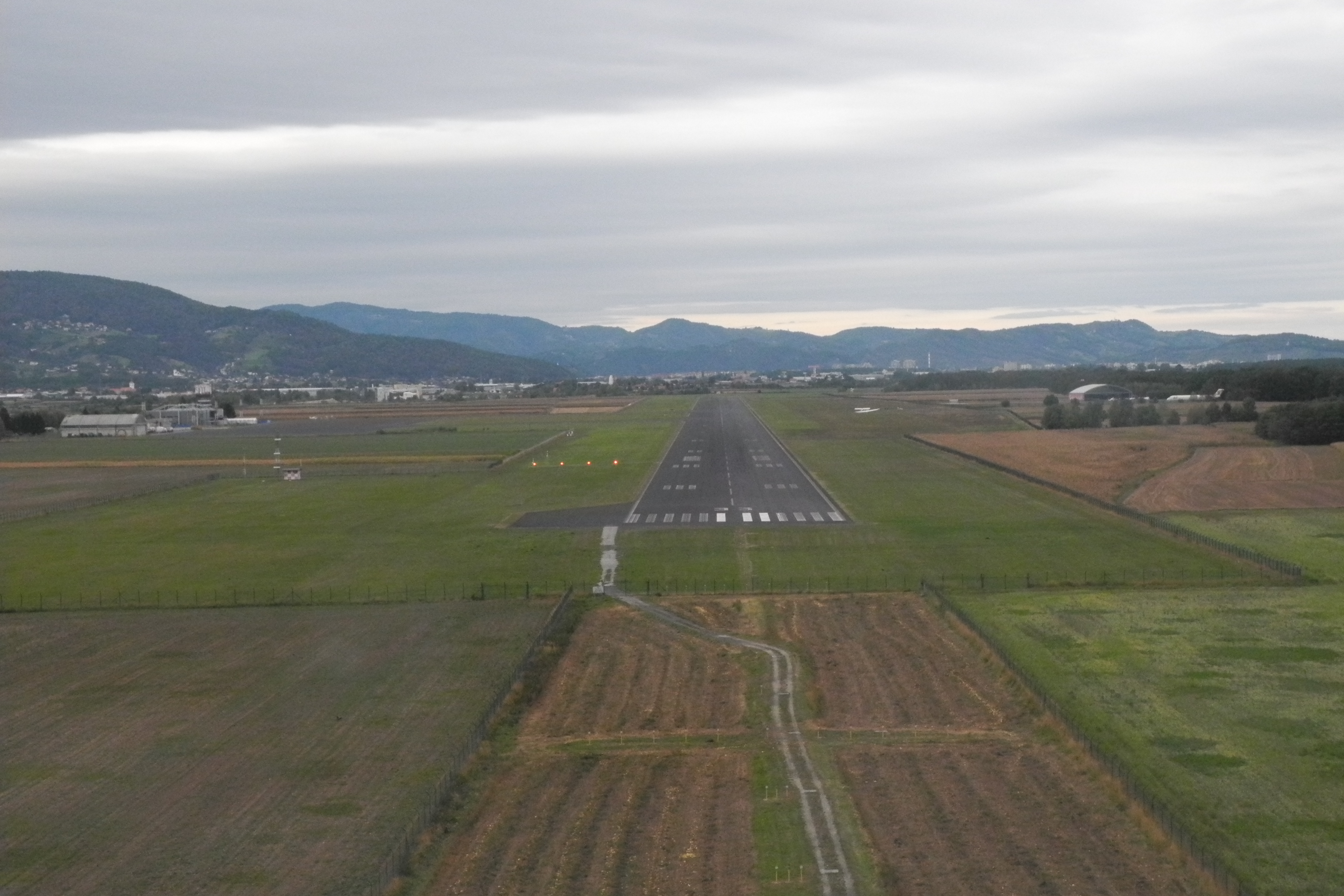
- IATA: MBX; ICAO: LJMB

Summary
- Airport type: Public
- Owner: Slovenia state
- Operator: DRI upravljanje investicij, d.o.o.
- Serves: Styria, Slovenia
- Location: Hoče–Slivnica
- Opened: 29 May 1976
- Hub for: Flight training
- Elevation AMSL: 267 m (876 ft)
- Coordinates: 46°28′47″N 015°41′10″E
- Website: mbx-airport.si

Map
- Location of the airport in Slovenia

Runways
Direction	Length		Surface
Direction	m	ft	Surface
14/32	2,500	8,202	Asphalt
14/32	1,200	3,937	Grass

Statistics (2018)
- Passengers: 2,435
- Passenger change 17–18: ▼60.9%
- Source: Slovenian AIP at EUROCONTROL, STV

Maribor Edvard Rusjan Airport (Slovene: Letališče Edvarda Rusjana Maribor) (IATA: MBX, ICAO: LJMB) is an international airport in Maribor, Slovenia. The second biggest and second most important Slovenian airport, it is the only other airport besides the airport in Ljubljana suitable for international commercial aviation, equipped with ILS. At this location, the airport Skoke has been for sports purposes since 1953, and in 1976 it was complemented for international traffic. It is located in Hoče–Slivnica which is about 5 km (3.1 mi) south from Maribor. In 2008 it was renamed after the Slovene pioneer aviator Edvard Rusjan. The oldest Slovene aeroclub: Letalski center Maribor, established in 1927, also operates as one of the founders at the airport. In recent years this airport has become a popular place for training for many European airlines.

== History ==
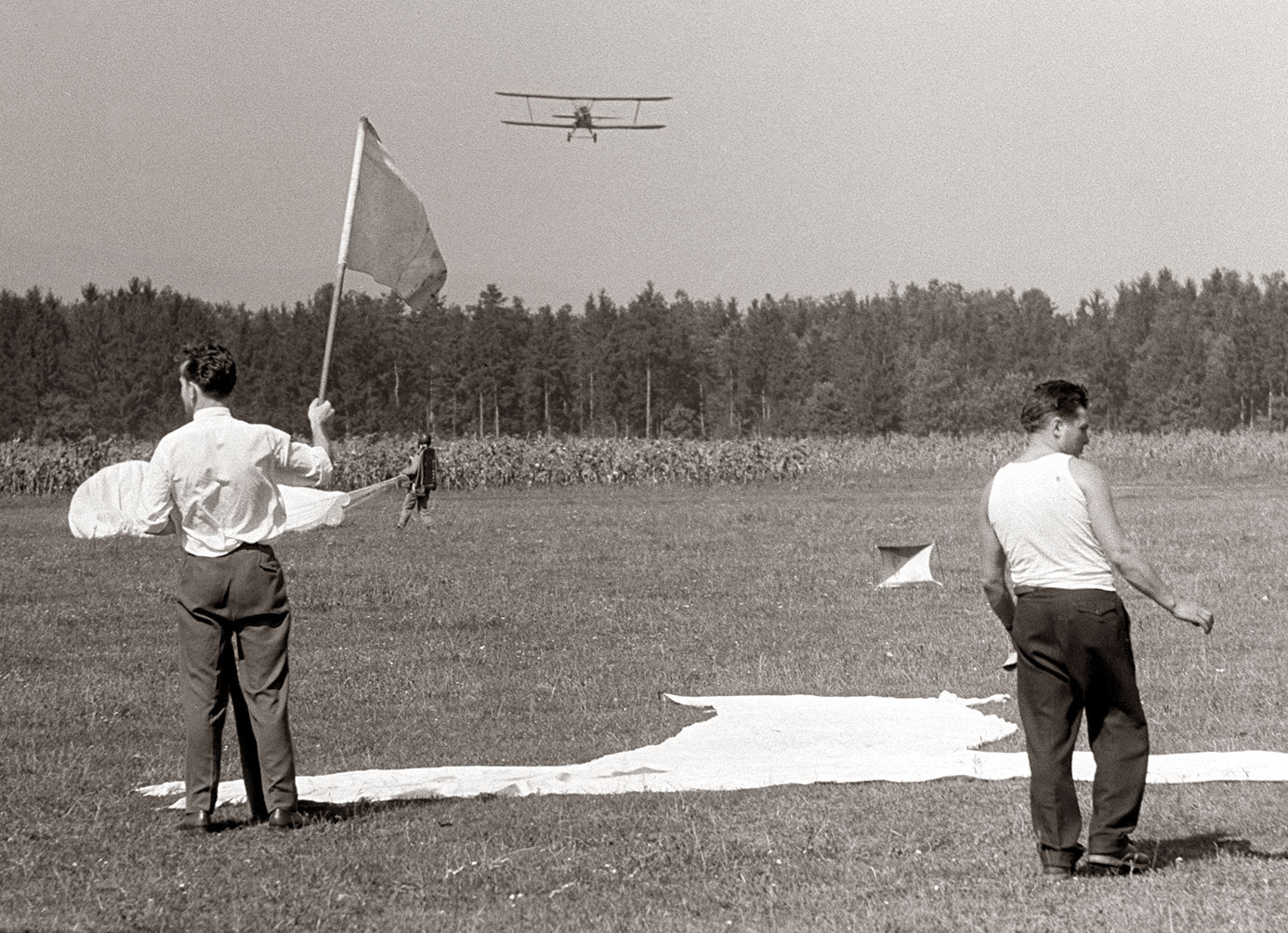
Aeroclub airport in 1958

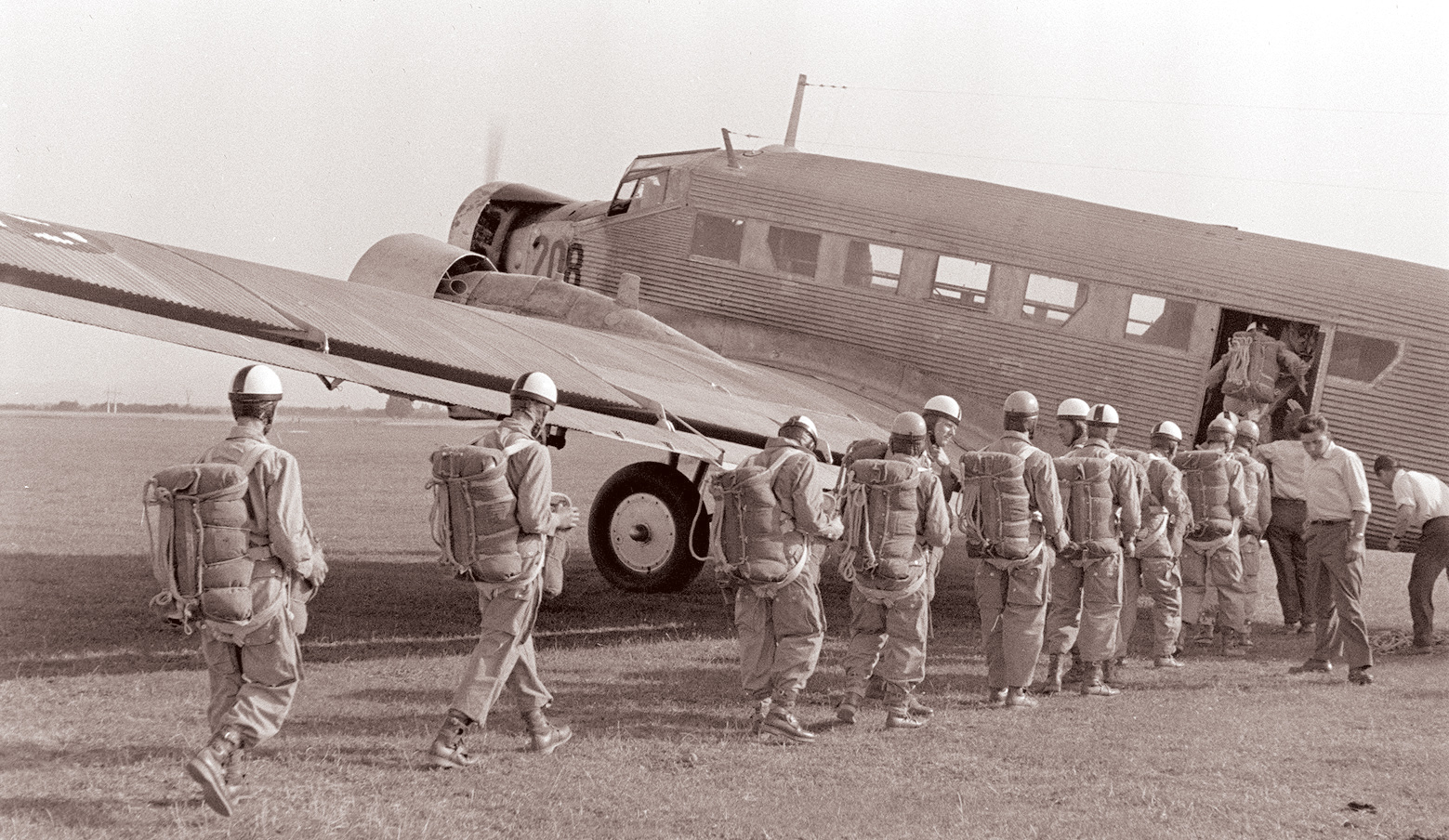
Skydivers Letalski center Maribor Ju 52 1960

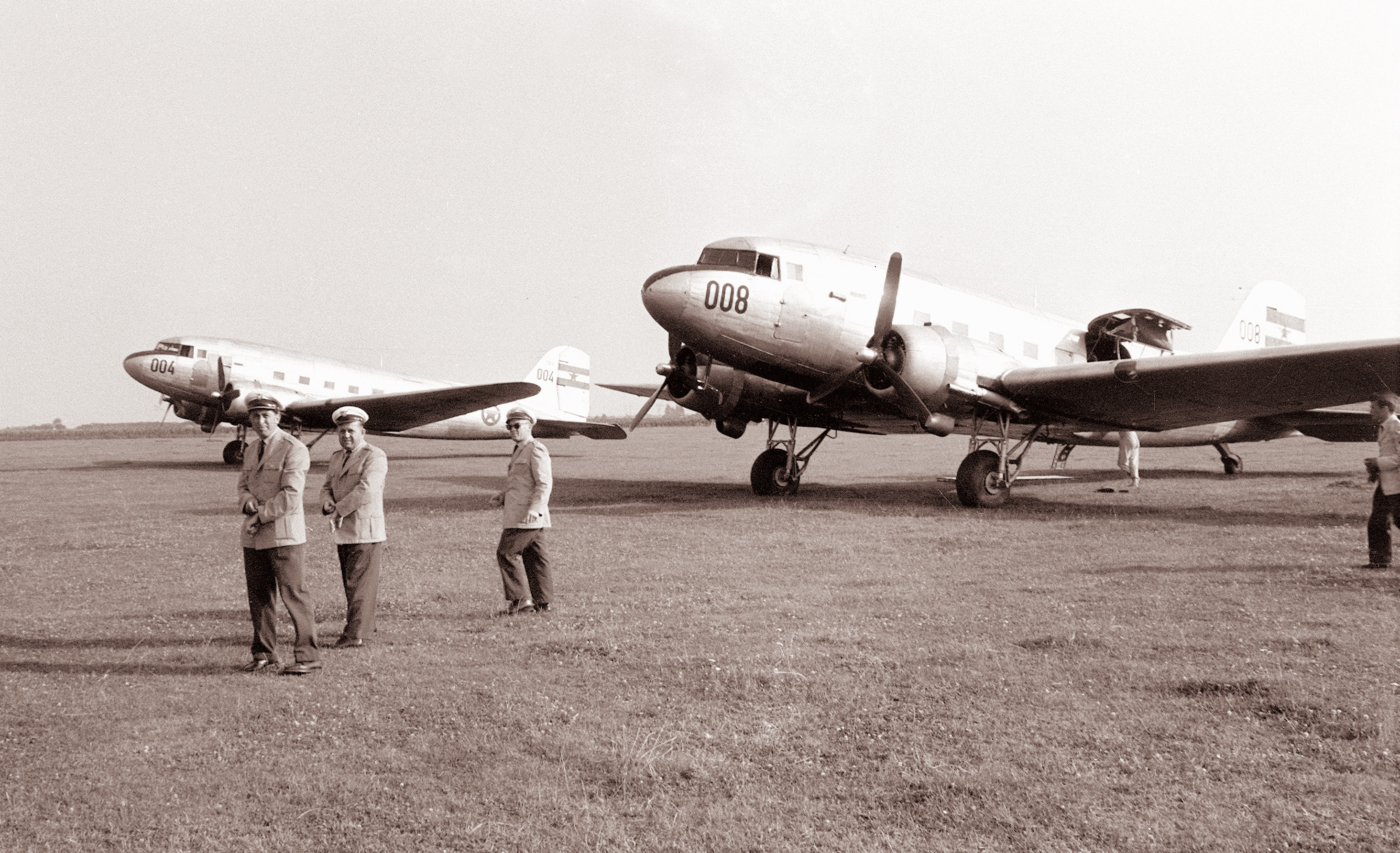
Skydiving Championship Douglas C-47 Dakota 1961

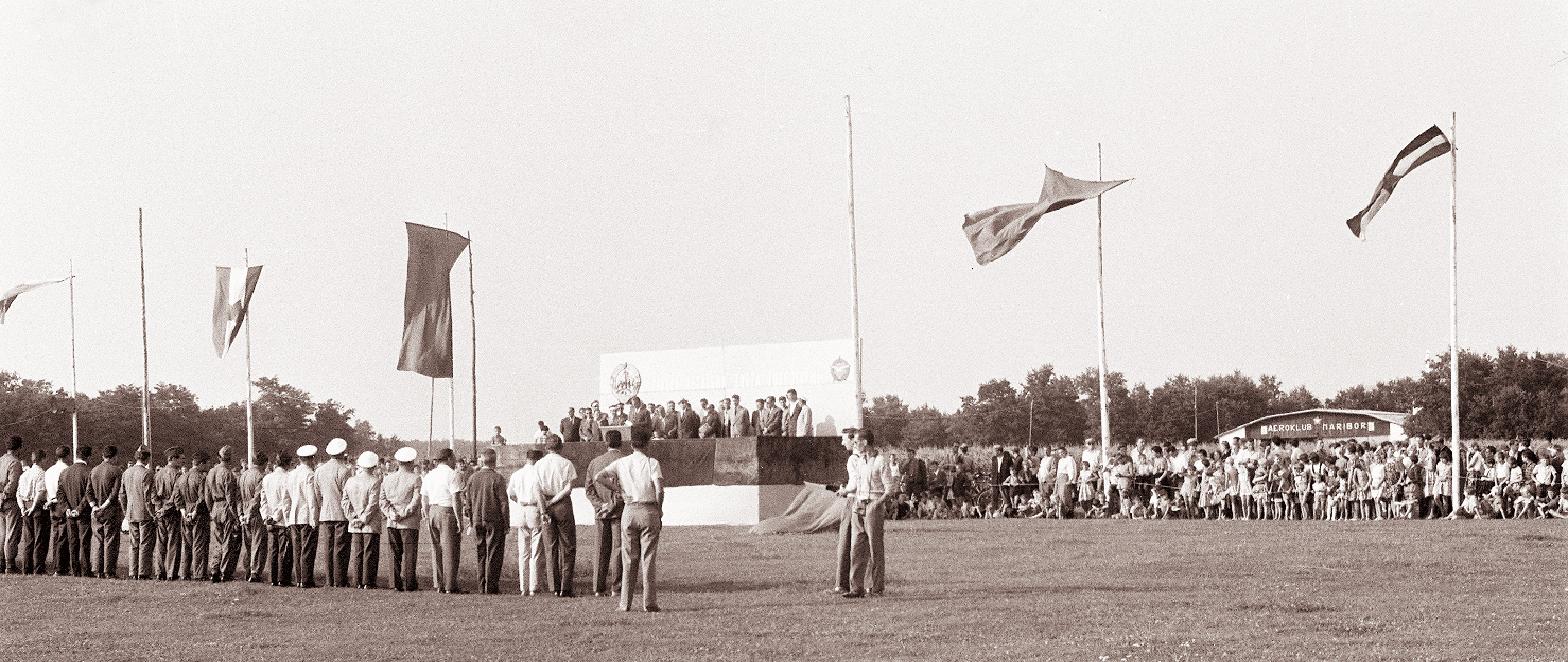
Skydiving Championship at Letalski center Maribor 1961

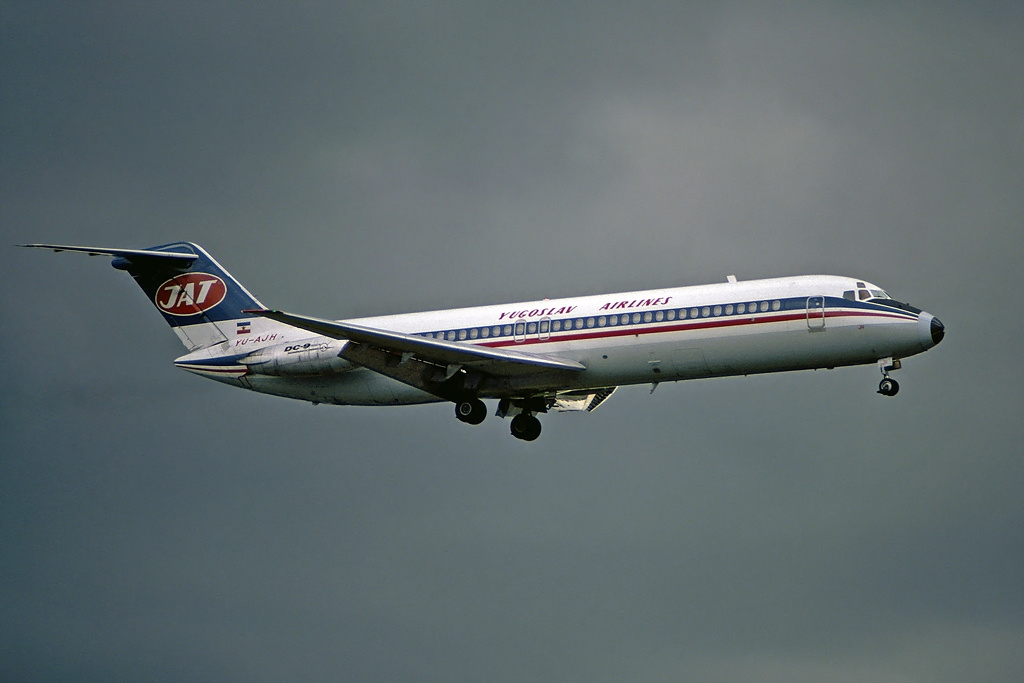
JAT DC-9 was the main carrier

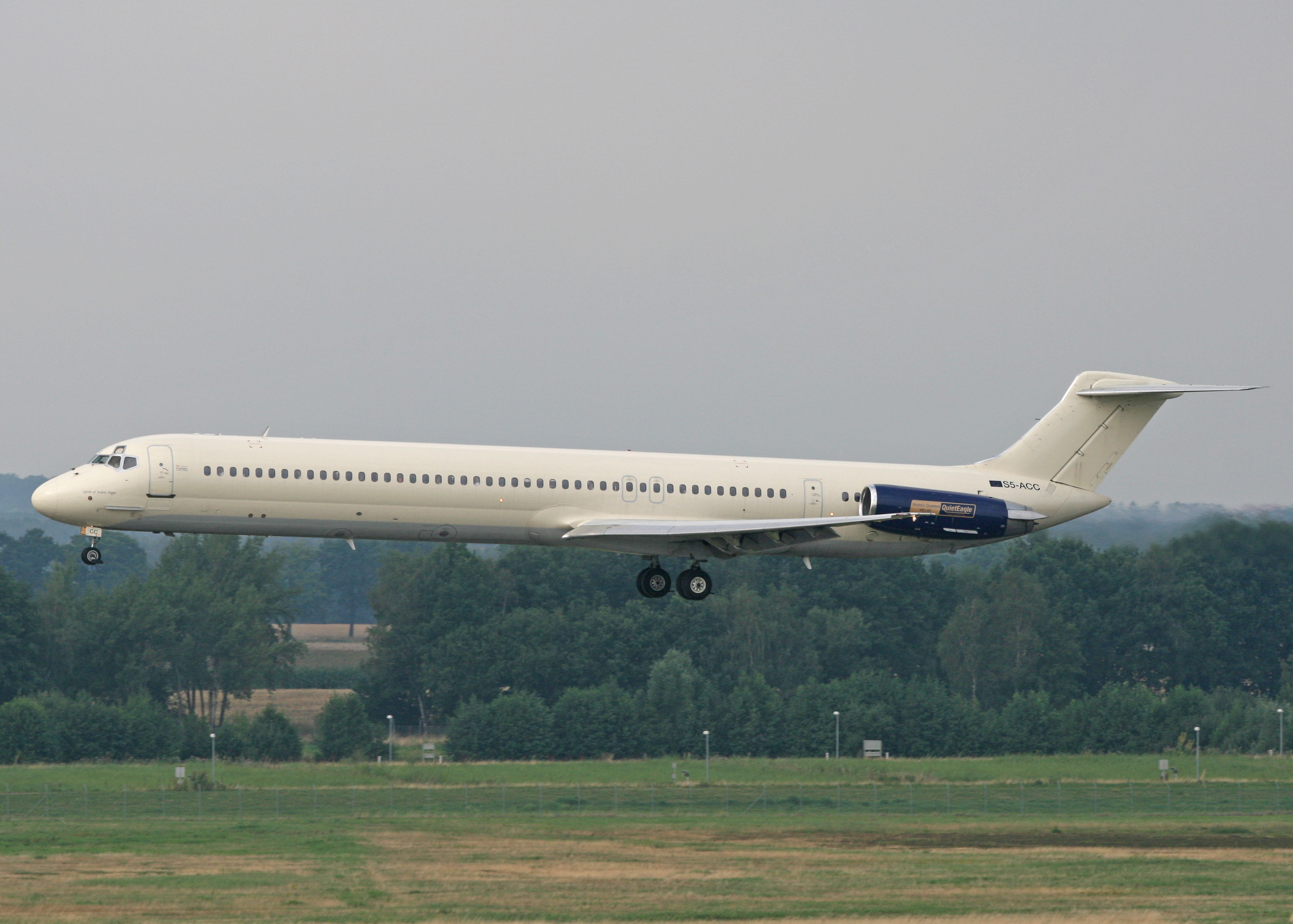
Aurora Airlines MD-82 was based in Maribor

In 1953, the aeroclub built at the current location a substitute grass aerodrome Skoke for aeroclub needs, since the former aeroclub airport Maribor Tezno was too dangerous to fly. During 1953 to 1976, when only a grass airport was operating, over 1,000 pilots were trained at this location by aeroclub flight school. With the desire of the Styrian region to become more connected with the world, an international airport for international traffic was built in 1976 and has two runways: grass and asphalt. The airport was opened for commercial traffic in May 1976. Since then this airport has been the second biggest and the second most important in Slovenia.

When Slovenia was a part of Yugoslavia, the airport was regularly served by state airline JAT, mainly connecting Belgrade, Tivat and the Croatian Adriatic coast airports such as Dubrovnik and Split. Moreover, Misr Overseas Airways also connected it with Cairo.

In the early 1990s, passengers and cargo traffic reached record highs. Around 85,000 passengers and 700 tonnes of cargo were carried per year. In 1999 its runway was renovated, as was the airport's apron in 2000.

In 2002, Aerodrome Maribor llc was sold to Prevent Global plc from Slovenj Gradec, as a majority owner. In 2005 the instrument landing system ILS CAT I and the distribution transformer station were renovated. The airport was later served with scheduled flights by Slovenian Spirit, an arm of Styrian Spirit, which offered scheduled flights to Paris and Salzburg until March 2006. Styrian Spirit ended operations due to insolvency.

On 8 March 2007, Ryanair announced that it would commence service between London-Stansted and Maribor in June 2007, three times weekly. The expectations from this service included an increase in tourist exploration of the region, which has great potential for all-year-round offerings. The service started on 7 June 2007, but ended 27 March 2008.

On 22 February 2008, the Government of the Republic of Slovenia decided to rename the Maribor Airport as Maribor Edvard Rusjan Airport. The renaming was made as a result of a suggestion of a Slovene citizen, Silvo Škornik. The airport's new name has been in use since 15 June 2008.

The airport's new terminal, which cost some €15 million, opened on 21 November 2012, with a capacity of at least 600,000 pax/year. In 2013, the old terminal was renovated and Prevent Global plc sold Aerodrom Maribor llc to AvioFun Ltd, an aviation company based in Libeliče.

The total number of passengers in 2013 was 15,000, an increase from the previous year.

In October 2014, Delavska hranilnica plc bought the airport for 1 million € and became its co-owner. Delavska hranilnica plc had a 57% share and AvioFun Ltd had a 43% share of the company.

During the summer of 2015, Adria Airways operated a seasonal service to London using London-Southend Airport between June and October with three flights per week.

On 9 June 2015, Slovenian savings bank Delavska hranilnica plc bought the remaining 43% share from AvionFun Ltd and became the sole owner of this airport.

In December 2016, Aerodrom Maribor, the operator of the airport, was sold to SHS Aviation. The new owner, which also owns VLM Airlines, announced its plans to invest up to 300 million euros into the airport. SHS Aviation's main priorities are extending the runway, building a new terminal and launching flights to large European cities as well as a few Chinese cities. In July 2017 SHS Aviation announced two new scheduled destinations from Maribor with its own airline, VLM Airlines Slovenia: Split and Dubrovnik, both in Croatia. The flights began on 8 August 2017 and were operated until the mid of August 2017.

On 18 July 2019 The Ministry of Infrastructure lets the airport to temporary management of the company DRI upravljanje investicij, d.o.o.

== Statistics ==
Year	Passengers	Growth
1978	187,516	–
1990	85,000	–
2004	6,215	–
2005	16,046	▲158%
2006	12,452	▼22%
2007	25,000	▲101%
2008	17,000	▼32%
2009	5,000	▼70%
2010	9,000	▲80%
2011	6,000	▼33%
2012	6,500	▲8%
2013	14,065	▲116%
2014	17,568	▲25%
2015	24,886	▲42%
2016	8,890	▼64%
2017	6,000	▼32.5%
2018	2,435	▼60.9%
Source: Siol

== Access ==
Maribor Airport, which is close to the A1 and right next to the A4 motorway, is easily accessed by road. There are car hire firms based at the airport. Other cities near the airport are Ljubljana (120 km), Graz (77 km) and Zagreb (107 km) away. It is also easily accessible by rail from all directions.

== Aero Club ==
Letalski center Maribor short LCM (English: Aviation center Maribor) is the oldest and the biggest Slovenian general aviation aero club operating at international Maribor Airport operating with 8 aircraft, 2 ultralights, 7 gliders and 10 parachutes. Founded on December 20, 1927 in Maribor and is well known for its flight school, ever since. It is considered to be the highest quality general aviation aero club in the country and Balkans. Annual number of flight hours is around 3500 h and 10000 landings.
