= Teamline Air =

Austrian airline

Teamline Air Luftfahrt GesmbH
IATA	ICAO	Call sign
L9	TLW	TEAMLINE
- Founded: 2001
- Ceased operations: 2004
- Operating bases: Friedrichshafen Airport
- Parent company: Styrian Spirit
- Headquarters: Bregenz, Austria

Teamline Air Luftfahrt GesmbH was an airline based in Austria, which was operational from 2001 to 2004. The air carrier was a subsidiary of Fairline, which ceased to exist in 2006.
