= Aurora Airlines =

Slovenian charter airline

IATA	ICAO	Call sign
HZ	URR	AIR AURORA
- Founded: 2005
- Ceased operations: 2009
- Hubs: Pristina International Airport, Maribor Edvard Rusjan Airport
- Fleet size: 5
- Headquarters: Maribor, Slovenia
- Website: www.fly-aurora.com (defunct)

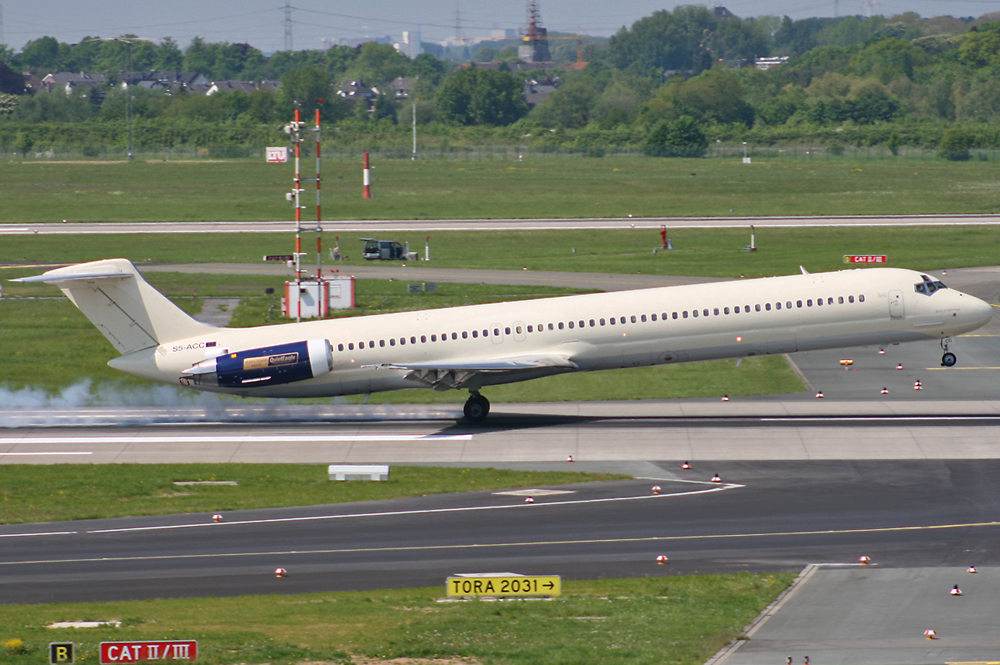
Aurora Airlines MD-82

Aurora Airlines was a charter airline based in Ljubljana, Slovenia. It operated several flights a week between the biggest cities of Germany to Kosovo. It had hubs at Pristina, Kosovo, and Maribor, Slovenia.

== Destinations ==
- Kosovo
  - Pristina (Pristina International Airport Adem Jashari) Hub
- Slovenia
  - Maribor (Maribor Edvard Rusjan Airport) Hub
