= Slovenian Spirit =

Slovenian subsidiary of Austrian airline Styrian Spirit

Styrian Airways GmbH & Co KG
| IATA | ICAO | Call sign |
|---|---|---|
| Z2 | STY | SLOVENIAN |
- Founded: 2003
- Ceased operations: 2006
- Hubs: Maribor Airport
- Fleet size: 5
- Destinations: 11
- Parent company: Styrian Spirit
- Headquarters: Graz, Austria
- Website: www.slovenianspirit.com

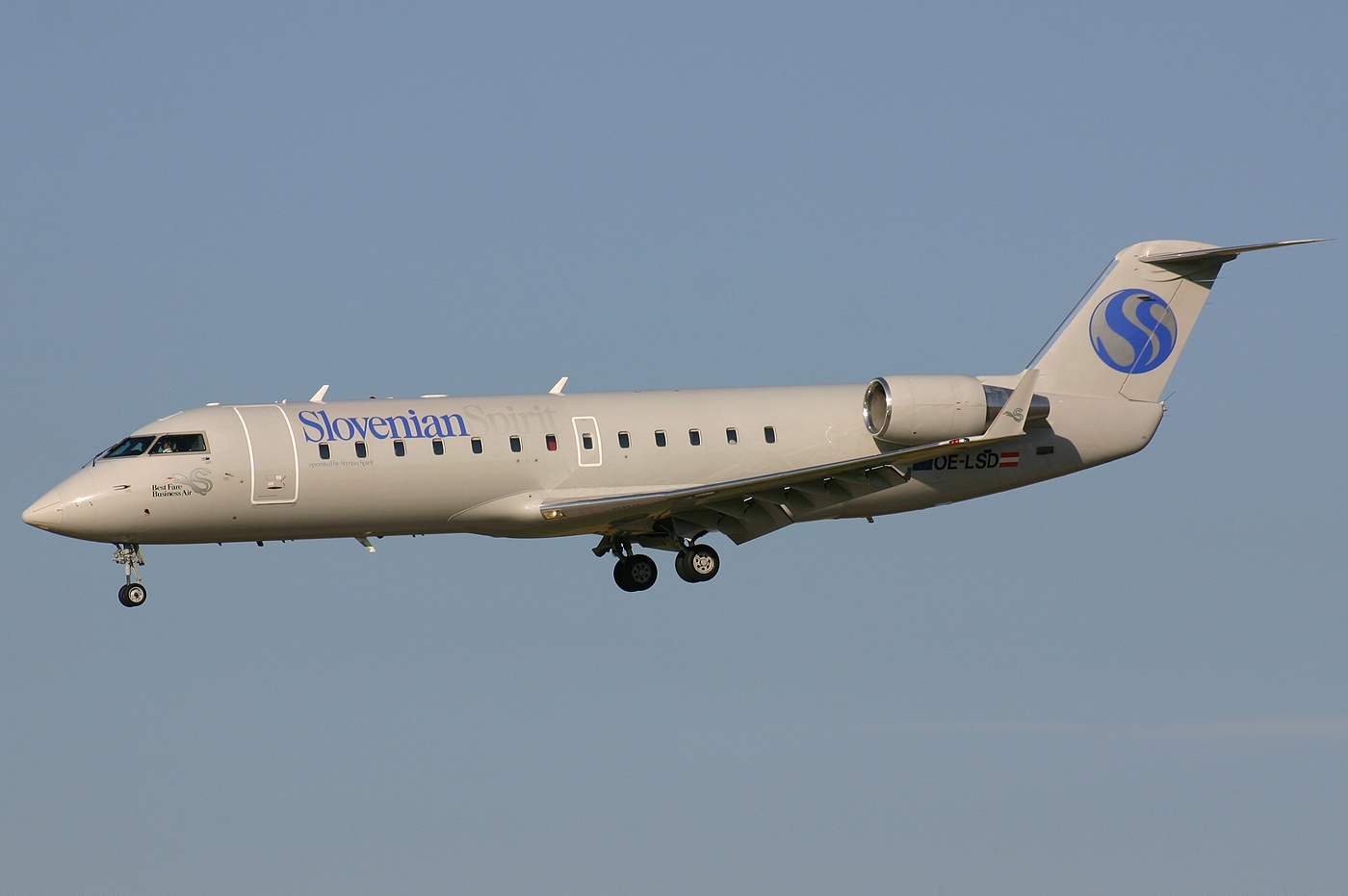
Slovenian Spirit Canadair CL-600-2B19 Regional Jet CRJ-200LR

Slovenian Spirit was the name of a subsidiary of the now-defunct Austrian airline Styrian Spirit.

== Services ==
Slovenian Spirit operated flights on the Styrian Spirit network connecting Maribor Airport in Slovenia with Salzburg in Austria, and Paris. The airline suspended services in March 2006.
