= Robin Hood Aviation =

Austrian airline

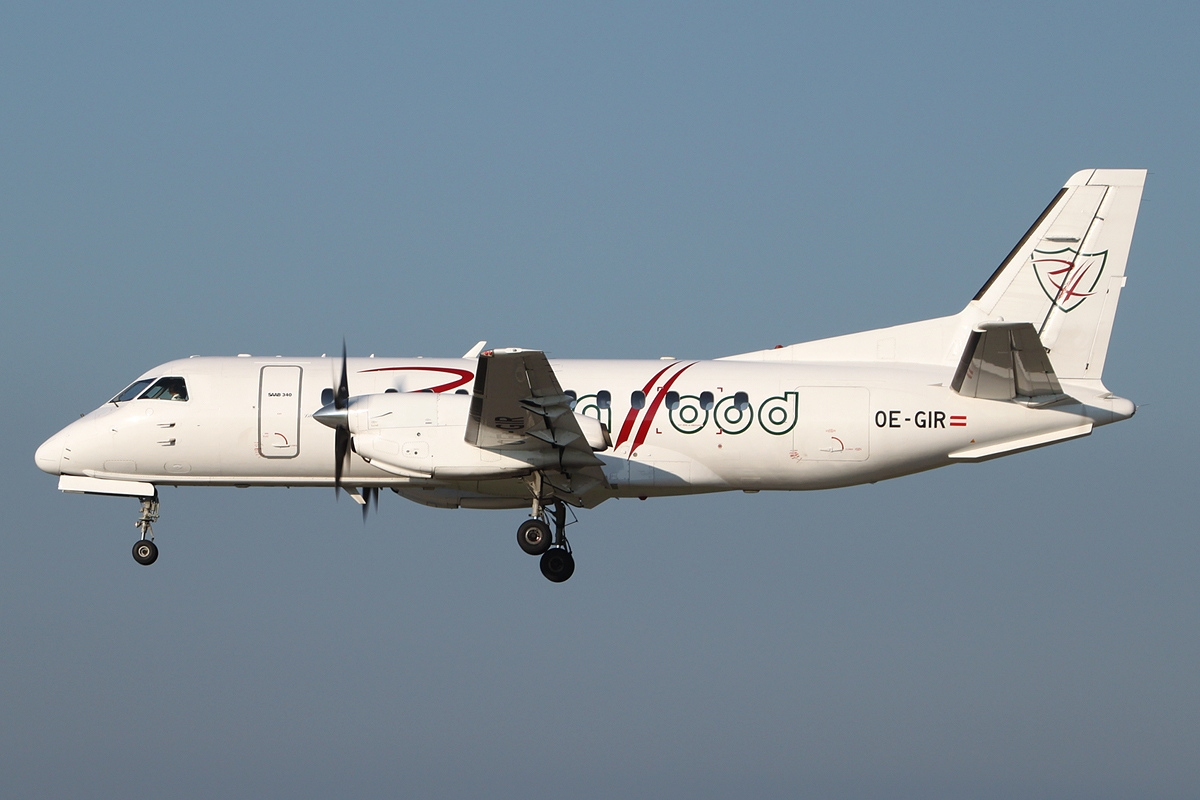
- Saab 340A
IATA	ICAO	Call sign
RH	RHA	SHERWOOD
- Founded: 2005
- Ceased operations: 2011
- Hubs: Graz Airport
- Fleet size: 2
- Destinations: 2
- Headquarters: Graz, Austria
- Key people: Helmut Stärker (Managing Director)
- Website: robinhood.aero

Robin Hood Aviation was an Austrian airline, operating from its base at Graz airport and from Linz to Zurich. It operated also charter flights. Majority owners were the Austrian entrepreneurs Dr. Helmut Rieder and Dr. Raimund Pammer (founders of Efkon Group).

== History ==
Robin Hood Aviation GmbH was founded in 2005 by Dr. Helmut Rieder, Dr. Raimund Pammer (both 2/3 owner) and 1/3 owner Georg Pommer The airline got its AOC (Air Operators Certificate) on 11 April 2007 and operated the first flight in the following month of May from Graz to Zurich with Saab 340A twin turboprop regional airliner.

Key dates of operational activity:

- October 2008 opened the route from Graz to Stuttgart
- Flights from Linz to Zurich stopped after some months operations
- In the summer of 2009 operated also from Klagenfurt (Carinthia) to Zurich
- March 2010 went into receivership after financial troubles; it had 24 employees at that time. The airline was able to continue its activities.
- 23 August 2011 filed for insolvency and ceased operations the following day.

== Destinations ==
- Austria
  - Graz - Graz Airport (GRZ)
  - Linz - Linz Airport (LNZ)
- Switzerland
  - Zürich - Zürich Airport (ZRH)

Former destinations:

  - Stuttgart - Stuttgart Airport (STR)
  - Klagenfurt - Klagenfurt Airport (KLU)

== Fleet ==
As of August 2011 the Robin Hood Aviation fleet consisted of the following aircraft:

- 2 Saab 340A (OE-GIR, OE-GOD)
