= Hörsching =

- Municipality
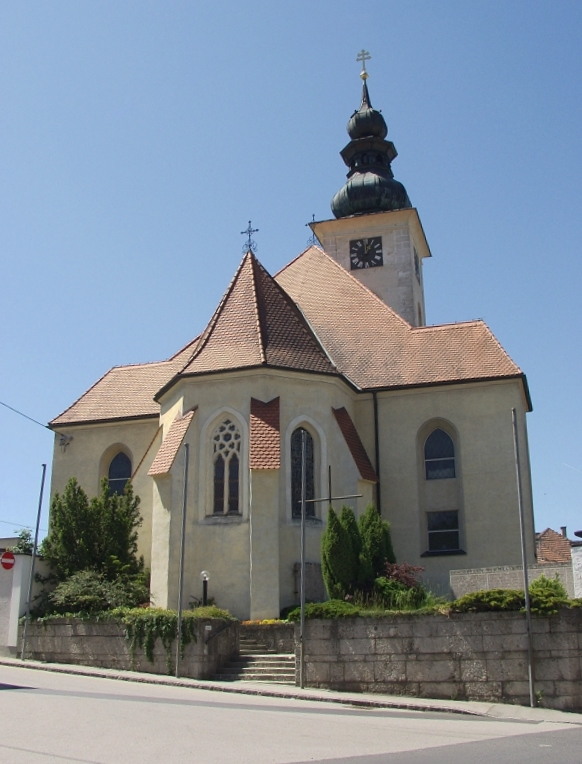

- Coat of arms

- Location within Austria
- Coordinates: 48°13′36″N 14°10′46″E
- Country: Austria
- State: Upper Austria
- District: Linz-Land

Government
  - Mayor: Gunter Kastler (ÖVP)

Area
  - Total: 20 km^{2} (7.7 sq mi)
- Elevation: 294 m (965 ft)

Population (2018-01-01)
  - Total: 6,062
  - Density: 300/km^{2} (790/sq mi)
- Time zone: UTC+1 (CET)
  - Summer (DST): UTC+2 (CEST)
- Postal code: 4063
- Area code: 07221
- Vehicle registration: LL
- Website: www.hoersching.at

Hörsching is a municipality in the district Linz-Land in the Austrian state of Upper Austria. It is next to the Linz Airport which is served by a shuttle bus from the Hörsching railway station. Anton Bruckner was schooled for a time in the village.

During World War II, on April 1, 1945 — Easter Sunday — U.S. Army 1st Lt. Harry Stewart was escorting a formation of B-24 Liberators near Linz, Austria on a mission to attack the railroad marshaling yards in St. Pölten, west of Vienna. During the flight home, they were attacked by a flight of German Focke-Wulf Fw-190s. Lt. Stewart got three victories, but three of the eight planes in his unit were shot down on the mission. One belonged to 2nd Lt. Walter Manning, who successfully bailed out of his P-51 and was captured. However, while downed flyers could generally count on becoming prisoners of war, Manning was lynched from a lamp post in Linz-Hörsching, Austria by troops inspired by local SS units.

In 2017, Harry Stewart returned to Austria for a ceremony that dedicated a memorial in Linz-Hörsching for his friend Walter Manning. “It was near this date 73 years ago that we were on a fighter sweep in this area of the country here and that’s when Walter was shot down. Later on, about three days later he met his demise, being captured by a mob and being executed at the time,” Stewart recalled during the ceremony. “I think that he would be very forgiving of the demise that he had. I think that he would be very pleased with the memorial that had been named in his honor.”

== Population ==
Historical population
Year	Pop.	±%
1869	1,627	—
1880	1,625	−0.1%
1890	1,884	+15.9%
1900	1,783	−5.4%
1910	1,870	+4.9%
1923	1,887	+0.9%
1934	1,942	+2.9%
1939	2,637	+35.8%
1951	3,891	+47.6%
1961	3,975	+2.2%
1971	4,163	+4.7%
1981	4,683	+12.5%
1991	5,101	+8.9%
2001	5,233	+2.6%
2011	5,780	+10.5%
