= Lauda (airline) =

Low-cost airline of Austria (2004–2020)

LaudaMotion

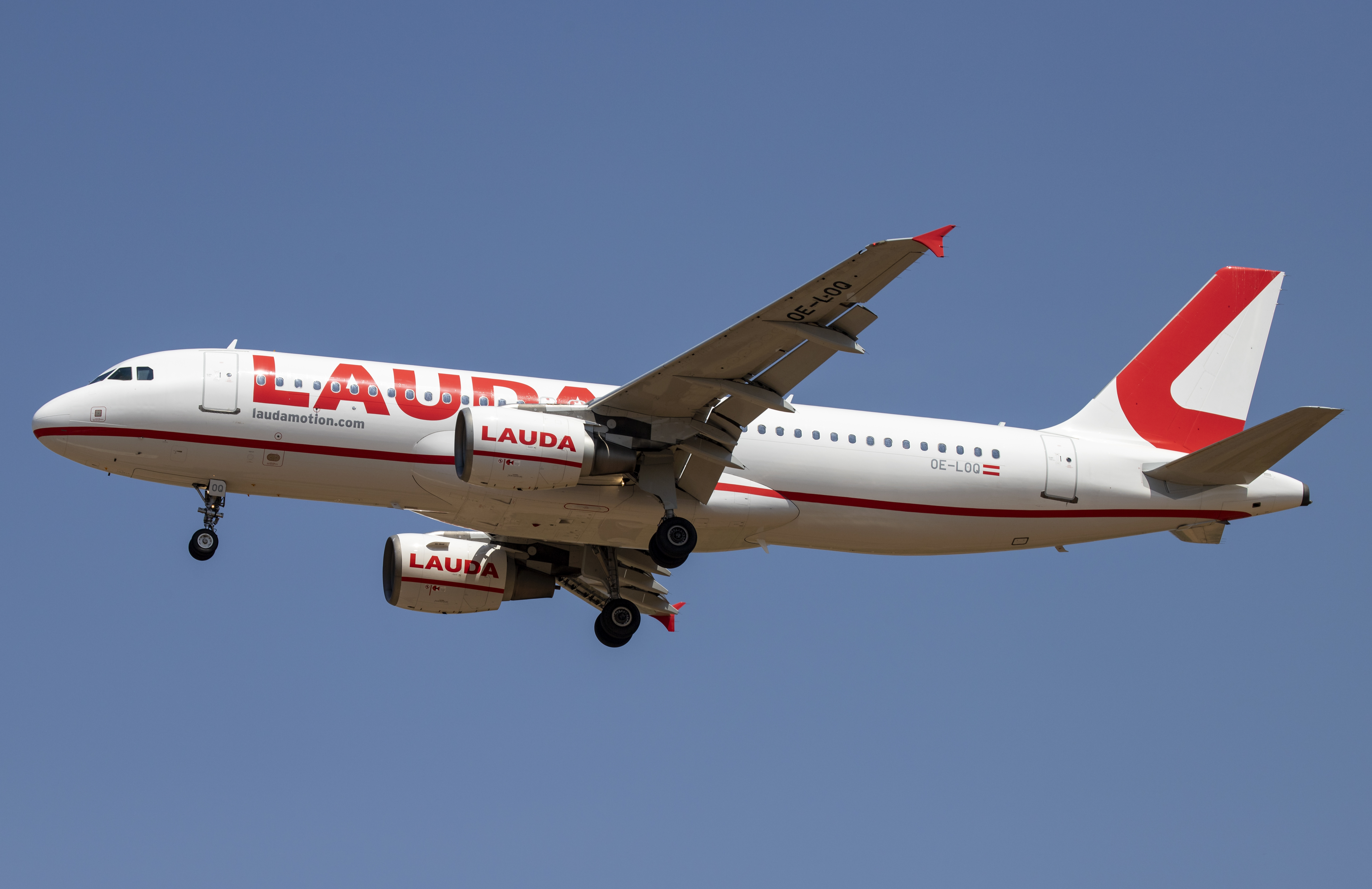
- Lauda Airbus A320
IATA	ICAO	Call sign
OE	LDM	LAUDA MOTION
- Founded: 2004 (as Amira Air); February 2016 (as LaudaMotion)
- Commenced operations: 25 March 2018 (as LaudaMotion)
- Ceased operations: 31 October 2020
- Operating bases: Palma de Mallorca; Vienna
- Parent company: Ryanair Holdings
- Headquarters: Schwechat, Austria
- Key people: Andrea Czvitkovits (director)

Lauda, legally Laudamotion GmbH (formerly Amira Air), was an Austrian low-cost airline based in Concorde Business Park in Schwechat, near Vienna, Austria. It was a subsidiary of Ryanair Holdings since August 2018, along with Ryanair DAC, Ryanair UK, Malta Air and Buzz. Former Formula 1 World Champion Niki Lauda had a minority stake in Amira Air before buying it outright in 2016.

In January 2018, Lauda acquired Niki, an airline originally founded by Niki Lauda. Amira Air then became a scheduled airline. Since June 2020, all Lauda flights were operated as wet leases with Ryanair flight numbers. As of November 2020, Lauda has been replaced by the Lauda Europe, located in Malta.

== History ==
=== Early developments ===
The airline was founded in 2004 as Amira Air by investor Ronny Pecik as a provider of charter flights for executive travel, serving European and international destinations.

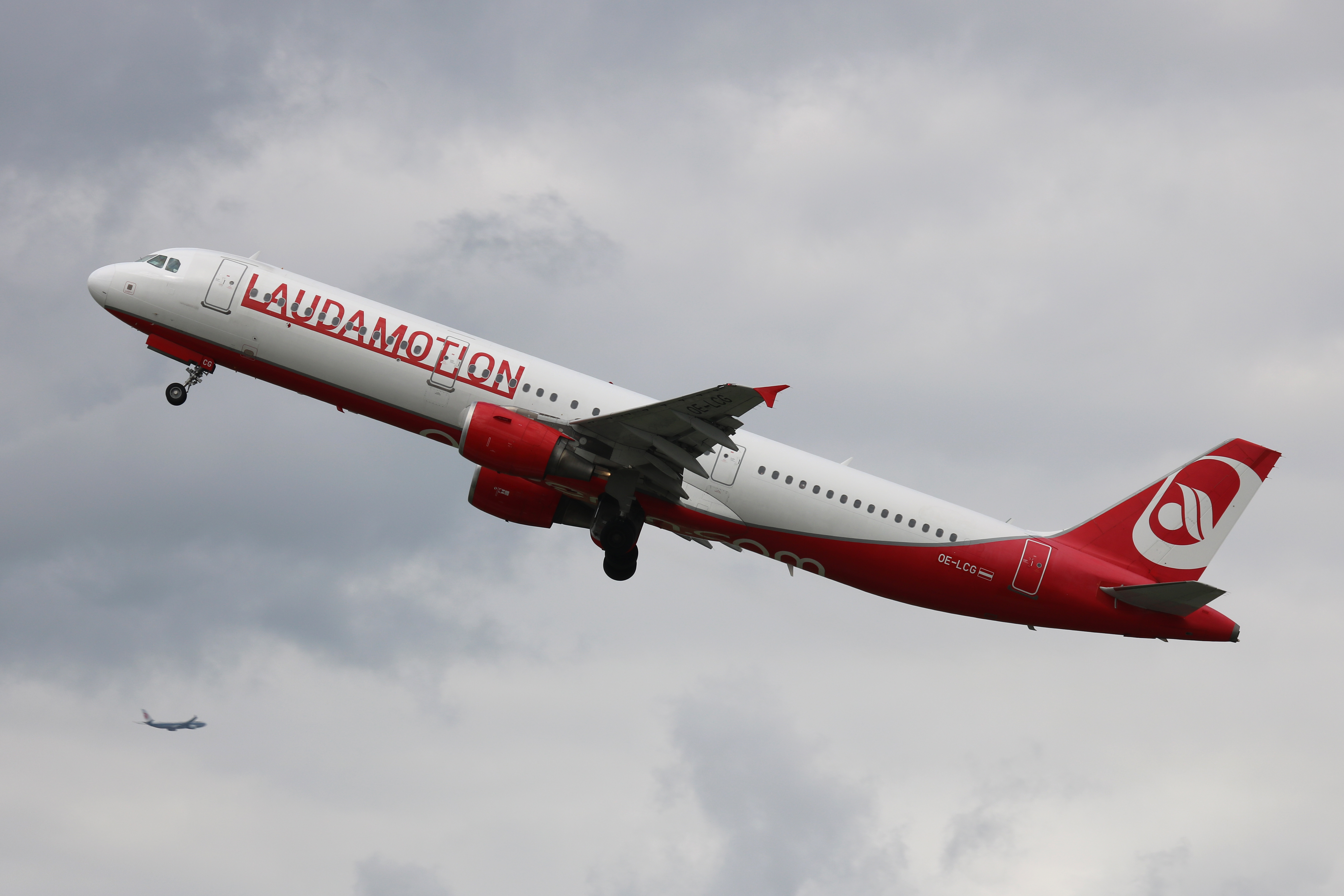
Airbus A321-200 in an Air Berlin interim livery with Laudamotion titles

In February 2016, Niki Lauda took over Amira Air and renamed it LaudaMotion. Until February 2018, the airline operated chartered business flights with a fleet of business jets. The operation was moved to a new unit to make way for scheduled passenger flights.

On 23 January 2018, the creditors' committee of the insolvent airline Niki agreed to sell the airline to Lauda Motion GmbH. It was announced that the Niki brand would be retired and all operations transferred to Laudamotion, which would operate 15 aircraft transferred from Niki and be ready to begin operations for the summer 2018 season.

On 16 February 2018, Condor agreed to take over sales and marketing of three LaudaMotion planes, as well as operational functions. Initial destinations will included flights from Düsseldorf, Frankfurt, Stuttgart and Basel to Majorca, Ibiza and Málaga, which could be booked through the Condor website and travel agencies.

Former Laudamotion logo

=== Takeover by Ryanair ===
On 20 March 2018, Ryanair announced it would acquire 24.9% of LaudaMotion, to rise to 75%, subject to approval by EU authorities. The deal was reported to be worth an initial €50m plus €50m for first year start up and operating costs. The intention was to reach profitability by the third year of operations with a fleet of 30 aircraft. On 29 March 2018, the airline announced it would open seven bases in Germany in addition to the bases at Vienna and Zürich. However, in May 2018 Laudamotion announced it would not go ahead with proposed routes to and from Zurich Airport owing to unavailability of leased aircraft.

In April 2018, Condor announced it was ending its cooperation and sales agreement with Laudamotion earlier than planned. Condor stopped providing sales infrastructure and stopped selling Laudamotion flights at the end of April 2018. In the same months, Eurowings also announced it would not extend its short-lived cooperation with Laudamotion. The wet-lease contract ended on 31 May 2018.

In August 2018, Ryanair announced it had increased its stake in the airline to 75% and that it planned to double the fleet from 9 to 18 aircraft. Laudamotion was scheduled to receive 18 Airbus A320 aircraft by summer 2019, which were to replace and expand its current fleet. In January 2019, Ryanair revealed that it completed the purchase of 100% of Laudamotion from NL Holdings in late December 2018. It also revealed further fleet expansion plans, increasing from 18 to 25 aircraft by end of 2019, and 40 by summer 2020.

Initially, the plan was for Laudamotion's fleet to remain exclusively Airbus, despite Ryanair only operating Boeing aircraft, and in March 2019, Laudamotion announced plans to purchase at least 100 (50+50 options) Airbus A321neo for future expansions. However, during an interview in May 2020 Ryanair CEO Michael O'Leary said, “I think Lauda will have a fleet of about 30 Airbus aircraft - we would probably replace those Airbus with Boeing over the next couple of years”.

In March 2019, the airline changed its brand name from Laudamotion to just Lauda.

In December 2019, Lauda announced the opening of its fifth base, at Zadar Airport in Croatia shifting over further capacity from parent Ryanair. However, the Zadar base was scrapped amidst the Coronavirus pandemic with a possible start delayed to 2021.

In May 2020, Lauda announced the planned closure of its largest base at Vienna International Airport on 29 May 2020. The planned closure was a source of conflict between Lauda and Ryanair, the labour union and the Austrian government. In June 2020, Ryanair decided that Lauda flights would be operated under its own FR code, downgrading Lauda from an airline to an inhouse wetlease operator. This includes the Vienna base which now will remain open in that function with the exception of flights to Tel Aviv which remains under the Lauda brand due to traffic rights.

At the same time, Ryanair cancelled all remaining Airbus A320 family orders for Lauda.

In July 2020, Lauda announced they would shut down their base at Stuttgart Airport by October 2020. Prior to this announcement, the base staff rejected a new labour agreement. In late July 2020, it was announced that Laudamotion GmbH would cease operations at the end of 2020, with the fleet being transferred to Malta-based Lauda Europe. The impact on operations is expected to be minimal. The new company will be the second Ryanair group entity to be based in Malta, alongside Malta Air.

In August 2020, Ryanair announced the closure of its base in Düsseldorf as well - which has been operated on a wetlease basis by Lauda - by 24 October 2020, leaving Lauda without bases in Germany.

As of 31 October 2020, Lauda ceased all operations with its assets being handed over to Lauda Europe, a concern located in Malta.

== Fleet ==
Lauda Airbus A320

As of July 2020, Lauda has operated the following aircraft:

Lauda fleet
Aircraft	In service	Orders	Passengers	Notes
Airbus A320-200	28	—	180	9 aircraft were operating for Lauda with Maltese registration
Total	28	—		

== See also ==
- Niki (airline)
