= Air Kärnten =

Austrian start-up airline which never started operations

IATA	ICAO	Call sign
-	-	—
- Founded: November 2014
- Ceased operations: April 2015
- Operating bases: Klagenfurt Airport
- Fleet size: —
- Destinations: 9 planned
- Headquarters: Klagenfurt, Austria
- Key people: Ingo Hitzenhammer, CEO
- Website: airkaernten.at

Air Kärnten was an Austrian start-up airline which never started operations.

== History ==
The company was founded in November 2014 and was named after the Austrian state of Carinthia or Kärnten in German. It planned to launch two weekly scheduled flights from Klagenfurt to London-Southend in May 2015 alongside several charter services. It announced charter flights from Klagenfurt to Girona, Lisbon, Palma de Mallorca, Naples, Rhodes and Kos as well as from Graz Airport to Preveza.

However, on 31 March 2015, Air Kärnten cancelled their planned scheduled route from Klagenfurt to London Southend Airport ahead of its start due to low demand - it just received nine bookings since the announcement of the route. In February 2015, it has been reported that several Austrian travel agencies did not sell holiday packages requiring Air Kärnten flights until the airline gained a license for their planned flight operations. The airline announced the likely start of operations as a virtual airline as the licence might not be granted ahead of the start of operations.

Air Kärnten planned to lease a 50-seater Bombardier CRJ200 aircraft to operate their services. However, as of March 2015, a change of the desired aircraft type had been expressed. The airline additionally announced the lease of a Fokker 100 for some flights.

The first flights should have commenced by 30 April 2015, however the website of Air Kärnten had been shut down a few weeks prior to this date without further information and the flights have been removed from the schedule of Klagenfurt Airport, where Air Kärnten was supposed to be based. Therefore, the state of Air Kärnten remained unclear. As of February 2017, there were no new signs of activity.

== Destinations ==
As of April 2015, Air Kärnten planned to operate the following route network:

Austria

- Graz - Graz Airport seasonal
- Klagenfurt - Klagenfurt Airport base

Greece

- Kos - Kos Island International Airport seasonal
- Preveza - Aktion National Airport seasonal
- Rhodes - Rhodes International Airport seasonal

Italy

- Naples - Naples International Airport seasonal

Portugal

- Lisbon - Lisbon Portela Airport seasonal

Spain

- Girona - Girona–Costa Brava Airport seasonal
- Palma de Mallorca - Palma de Mallorca Airport seasonal

== Fleet ==
As of April 2015, Air Kärnten planned to utilize the following aircraft:

Aircraft	In service	Orders	Passengers	Notes
Bombardier CRJ200	—	1	50	planned to be transferred from Cimber on lease from Bombardier
Fokker 100	—	1	100	planned to be leased
Total	—	2		
