= Niki (airline) =

Low-cost airline of Austria (2003–2017)

Coordinates: 48.1238°N 16.5624°E

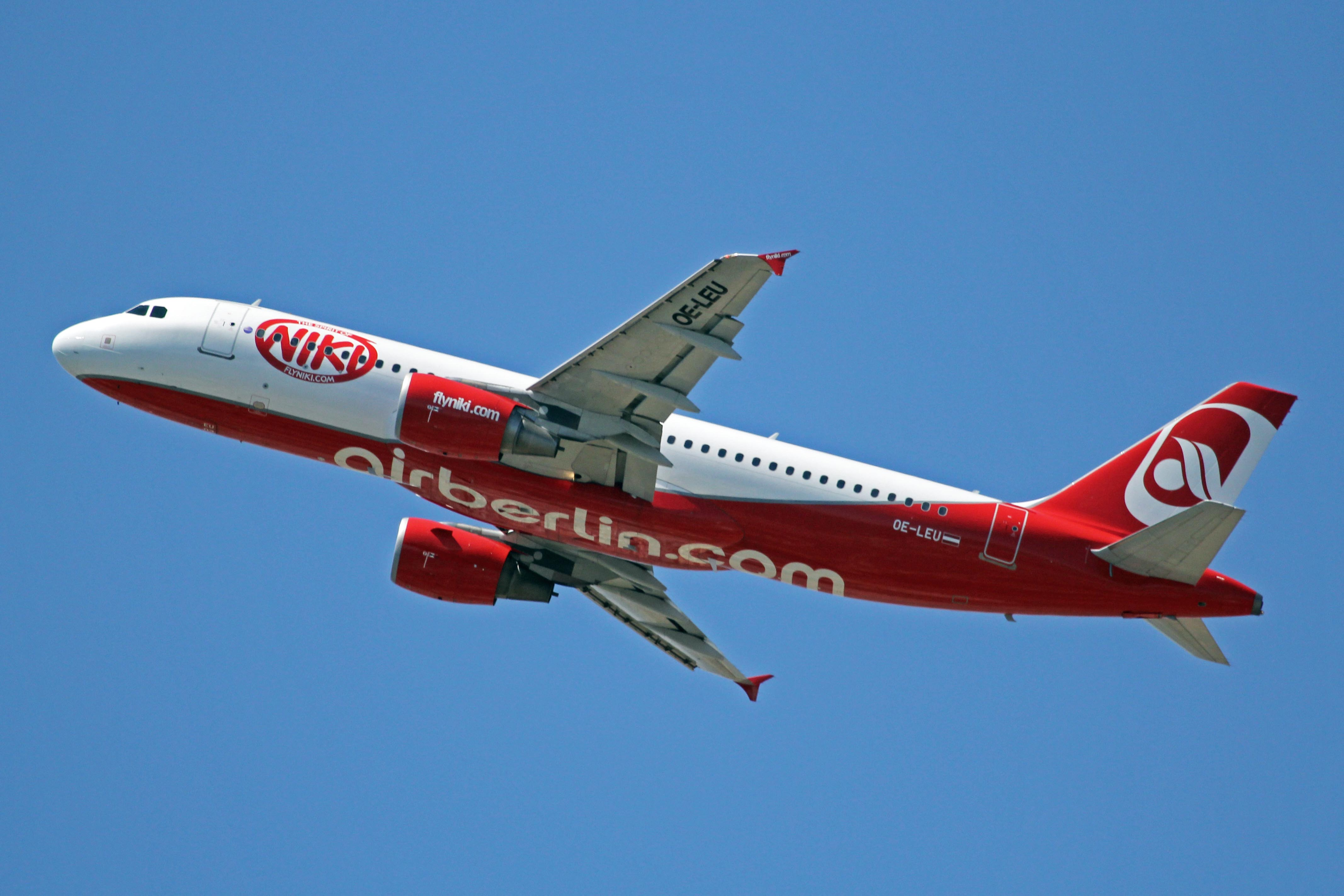
- Airbus A320-200 in the last livery used from 2012 until 2017
IATA	ICAO	Call sign
HG	NLY	FLYNIKI
- Founded: 28 November 2003
- Ceased operations: 14 December 2017 (merged into Amira Air to become LaudaMotion)
- Operating bases: Vienna Airport
- Frequent-flyer program: topbonus
- Alliance: Oneworld (affiliate; 2012–2017)
- Parent company: Air Berlin
- Headquarters: Schwechat, Austria
- Key people: Oliver Lackmann (CEO)
- Founder: Niki Lauda

Niki, also styled NIKI or flyNiki (legally NIKI Luftfahrt GmbH) was an Austrian low-cost airline headquartered in Office Park I at Vienna Airport in Schwechat. It operated scheduled and charter services to European and North African leisure destinations from Vienna, Salzburg, Graz and Innsbruck and also started services from several German airports in March 2017. Niki had a variety of owners, including two stints of ownership by former Lauda Air founder and three time Formula One World Champion, Niki Lauda.

== History ==
=== Early years ===
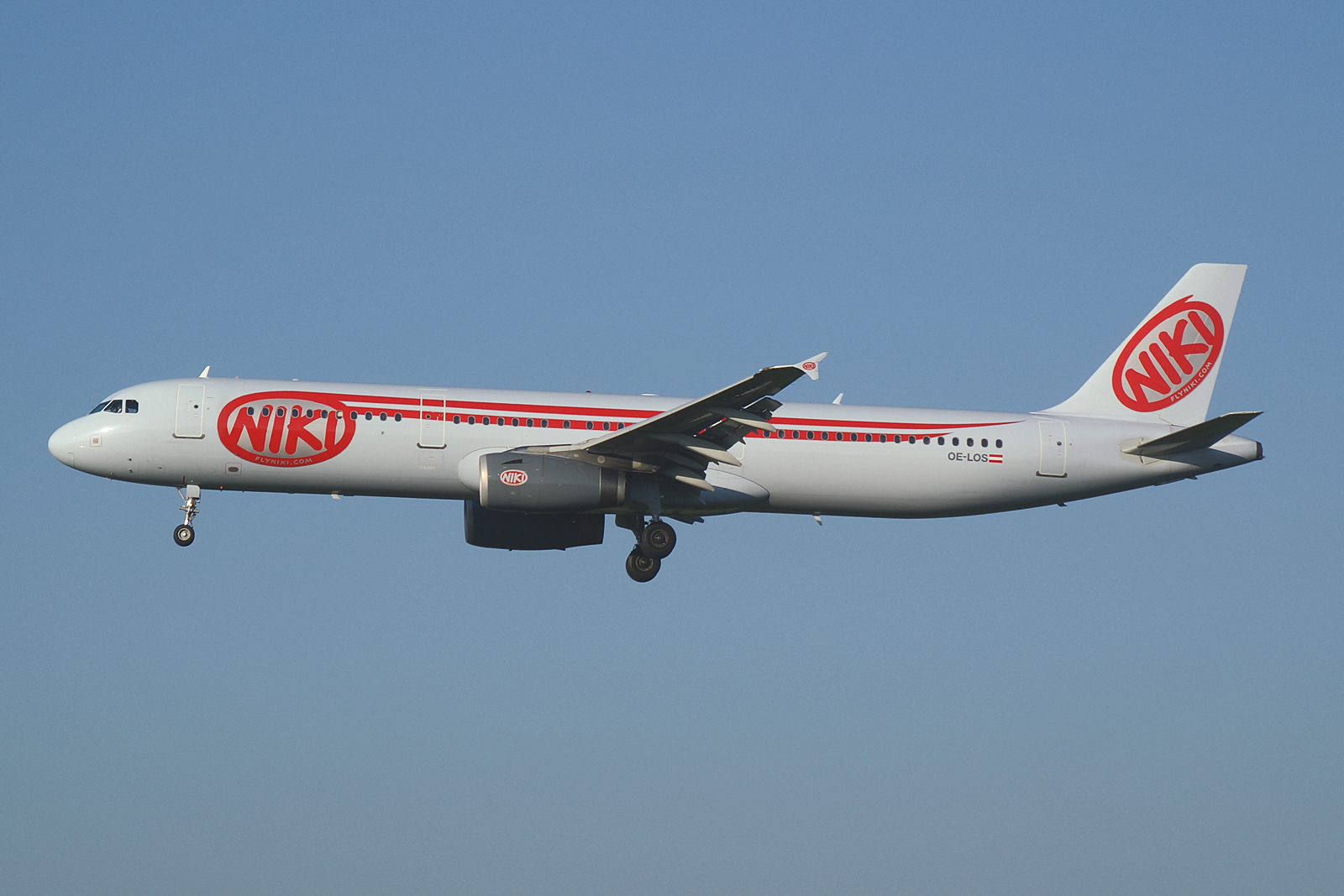
Airbus A321-200 wearing the airline's first livery

In 2003, Niki Lauda, ex-Grand Prix driver and founder of Lauda Air, acquired some Aero Lloyd Austria assets. The new airline, branded just Niki, started schedules on 28 November 2003. Although the airline was often described as "low-cost", it provided full services, such as free refreshments, newspapers, and baggage. It offered a sandwich or a cold snack, soft drinks, juice, tea, and coffee on all short-haul flights as well as on charter routes to Greece, Tunisia, and Turkey. On mid-haul charter flights to the Canary Islands and Egypt, all passengers were offered a warm snack. Also, gourmet menus from Demel could be ordered before the flight. There was also a buy on board service.

=== Development as an Air Berlin subsidiary ===
On 9 January 2004, Niki announced cooperation with Air Berlin which continued throughout the rest of the decade. In these years flyNiki brand was strengthened more and more. In November 2011, Niki merged completely with Air Berlin, sharing operations, booking systems, and aircraft. On 20 March 2012, Niki became an "affiliate member" of Oneworld as a subsidiary company of Air Berlin. Starting in late 2012, Niki successively repainted their aircraft in the Air Berlin paint scheme, using the Niki logo only close to the nose. The new paint scheme was applied during regular C checks.

In October 2014, Niki announced the cancellation of their flights from Vienna to Copenhagen, Moscow, and Frankfurt due to decreasing demand. In exchange, new leisure routes will be started by summer 2015. Also in spring 2015, Niki started to replace its fleet of Embraer 190s with Airbus A319-100s from its parent, Air Berlin, with the used Embraers being transferred to Helvetic Airways.

=== Sale to Etihad Airways ===
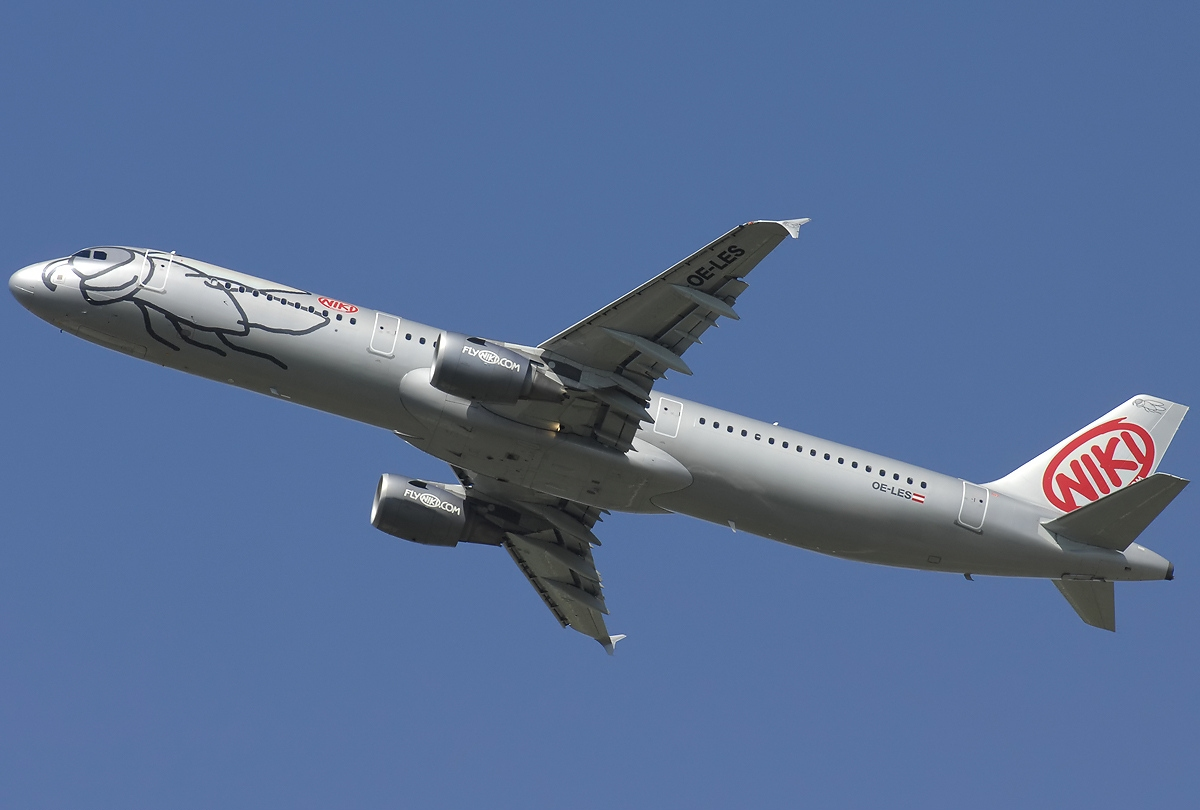
Airbus A321-200 in the livery used until 2012

On 5 December 2016, parent company Air Berlin announced plans to sell its entire 49 percent stake in Niki to its own minority owner Etihad Airways. Etihad Airways itself would merge Niki into a new joint-venture to be created with the German leisure carrier TUIfly. At the same time, Niki and Air Berlin would exchange several aircraft to harmonize each fleet. It had also been announced that Niki would take over several routes to southern European, north African, and Turkish leisure destinations from Air Berlin as part of the new joint-venture. However, the sale never became a reality.

Also in December 2016, Niki announced the termination of its only medium-haul route, from Vienna to Abu Dhabi, Etihad's home base, by March 2017. Niki later also announced it plans to terminate all of its 12 routes from Vienna to non-leisure destinations such as Milan or Zürich by 30 January 2017. In January 2017, it was also announced that Niki will cease all operations to and from Linz Airport at short notice due to the restructuring measures. The announcement was made after the 2017 schedule had already been made available for booking. For the 2017 season, Niki reduced the number of flights from Austria to 56 flights a week to 20 destinations, compared to 34 destinations in 2016.

Shortly after, it was announced that Niki would take over several Air Berlin leisure routes to and from Germany. It was also announced that Niki's fleet will be switched over to Airbus A321s only while the smaller A319s and A320s are handed over to Air Berlin. It had also been announced that TUI fly Deutschland will additionally start to operate 15 Boeing 737s currently wet-leased to Air Berlin for Niki.

=== Failed takeover by Lufthansa and IAG ===
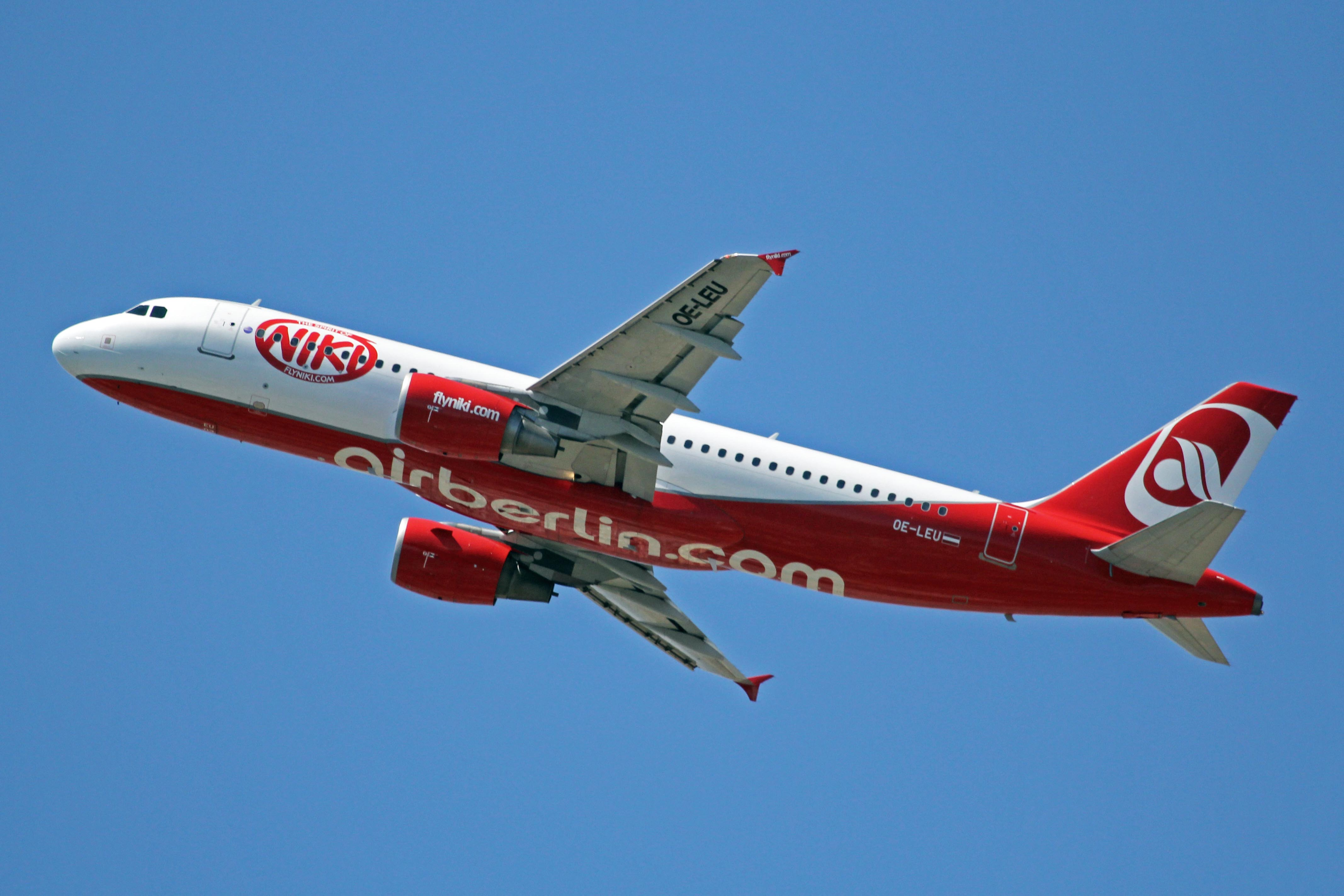
Niki Airbus A320-200 in the final livery used from 2012 until 2017

On 17 August 2017, Niki's parent Air Berlin announced it was filing for bankruptcy but that all operations would continue until further notice. On 9 October 2017, Air Berlin told its staff that it would cease all remaining operations under its own brand name, but that Niki flights would continue after this date.

On 12 October 2017, it was announced that German Lufthansa would purchase some of the assets from Air Berlin which included Niki and operations would continue and jobs were to be saved. On 24 October 2017, it was announced that Niki was to be absorbed into Lufthansa's low-cost subsidiary Eurowings Europe. It was announced that Lufthansa had plans to cease the Niki brand by the end of 2017 altogether.

However, on 13 December 2017, Lufthansa pulled out of the agreement due to signs from the European Commission that the merger would not be approved. Niki declared bankruptcy and ceased all operations on 14 December 2017. The day after, former owner Niki Lauda expressed interest in repurchasing the airline named after him.

On 29 December 2017, it was announced that International Airlines Group (IAG), parent company of British Airways, Iberia, Aer Lingus and Vueling, would acquire for 36.5 million euros major parts of Niki including 15 Airbus A321 aircraft and traffic rights in Düsseldorf, Munich, Vienna, Zurich and Palma de Mallorca. IAG planned to establish a new Austrian subsidiary of Spanish low-cost carrier Vueling as a replacement for Niki. For this purpose, a new subsidiary of Vueling in Austria was to be founded and act independently. Of the approx. 1000 Niki employees, 740 were to be retained. On 8 January 2018, a Berlin administrative court ruled that only an Austrian court had the jurisdiction to handle the insolvency of Niki.

=== Subsequent takeovers ===
In January 2018, Niki Lauda's company LaudaMotion was confirmed to have outbid IAG for Niki. Less than two months later, Ryanair agreed to purchase a majority stake in Laudamotion, initially acquiring almost 25 percent for less than 50 million euros ($61.7 million) with the intent to purchase another 50 percent at a later date. The deal was subsequently approved by the European Union and came into force in August. Eleven Niki aircraft were operated by Laudamotion as of April 2018.

== Destinations ==
Niki operated scheduled services to leisure destinations mainly in Spain, Portugal, and North Africa from its home base in Vienna as well as several more airports throughout Austria, Germany, and Switzerland.

=== Codeshare agreements ===
Niki maintained codeshares with the following airlines:

- Alitalia
- American Airlines
- Etihad Airways
- Iberia

== Fleet ==
Prior to the shutdown in December 2017, the fleet of Niki consisted of the following aircraft:

Aircraft	In service	Orders	Passengers			Notes
Aircraft	In service	Orders	C	Y	Total	Notes
Airbus A320-200	2	3	–	180	180	
Airbus A321-200	15	—	–	210	210	
Airbus A321-200	15	—	–	212	212	
Boeing 737-700	5	—	–	144	144	operated by TUI fly Deutschland
Boeing 737-800	8	—	–	186	186	operated by TUI fly Deutschland
Total	30	3				
