= Styrian Spirit =

Austrian airline

Styrian Airways GmbH & Co KG

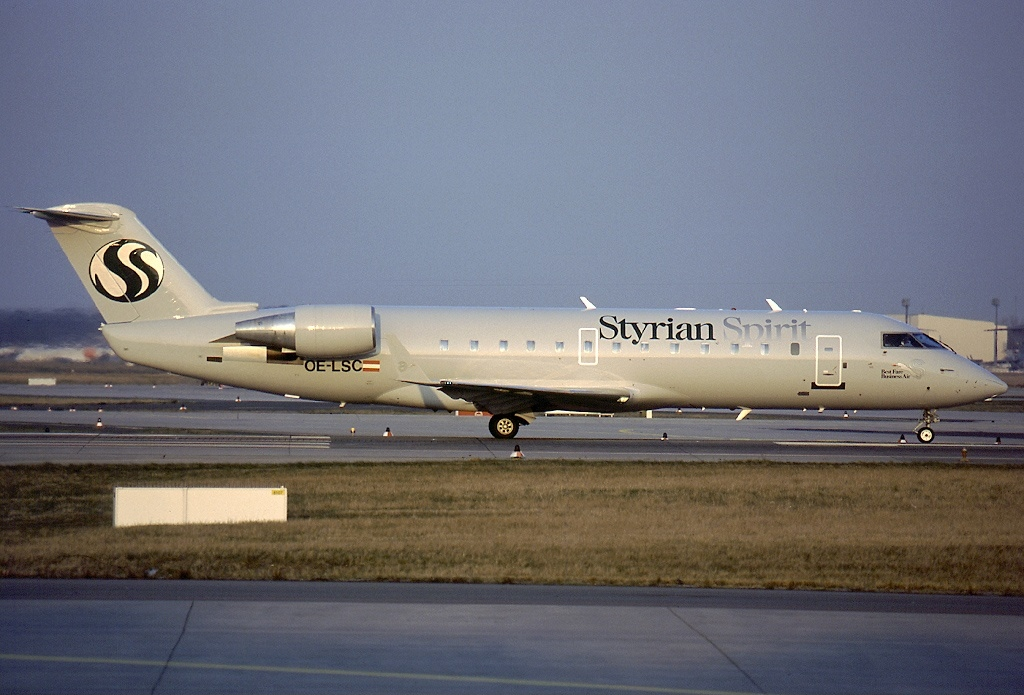
- Canadair CRJ200
IATA	ICAO	Call sign
Z2	STY	STYRIAN
- Founded: 2002
- Commenced operations: 2003
- Ceased operations: March 24, 2006
- Hubs: Graz Airport
- Fleet size: 5
- Destinations: 11
- Headquarters: Graz, Austria
- Website: www.styrianspirit.com

Styrian Spirit was an airline based in Graz, Austria, the capital of Styria lander. It operated scheduled services to destinations within Europe and also some charter flights.

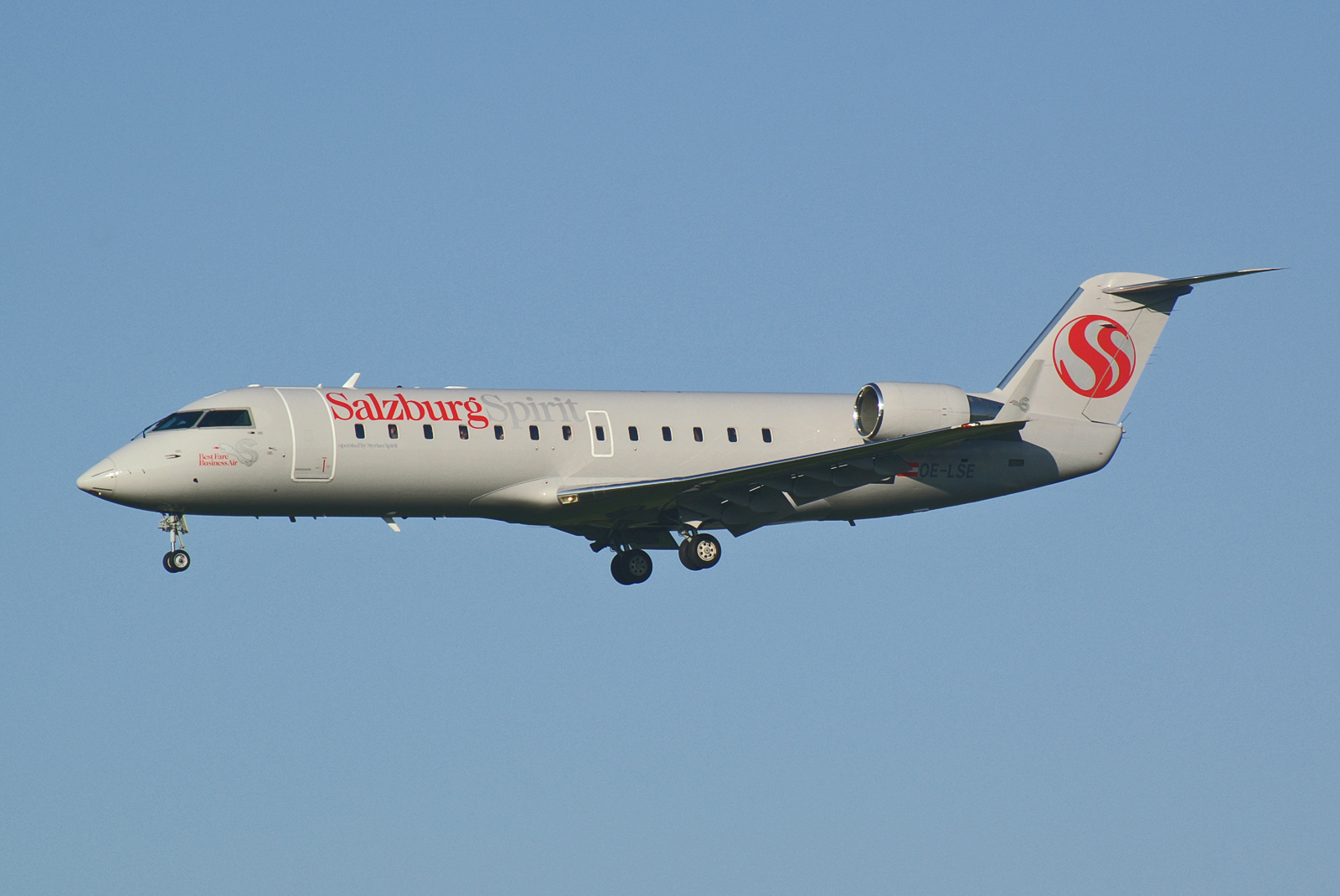
A Canadair CRJ200 in Salzburg Spirit colors

The airline also operated as Slovenian Spirit and Salzburg Spirit on routes to and from Salzburg to Maribor, Slovenia. Two of its aircraft were painted in Salzburg Spirit and Slovenian Spirit livery.

== History ==
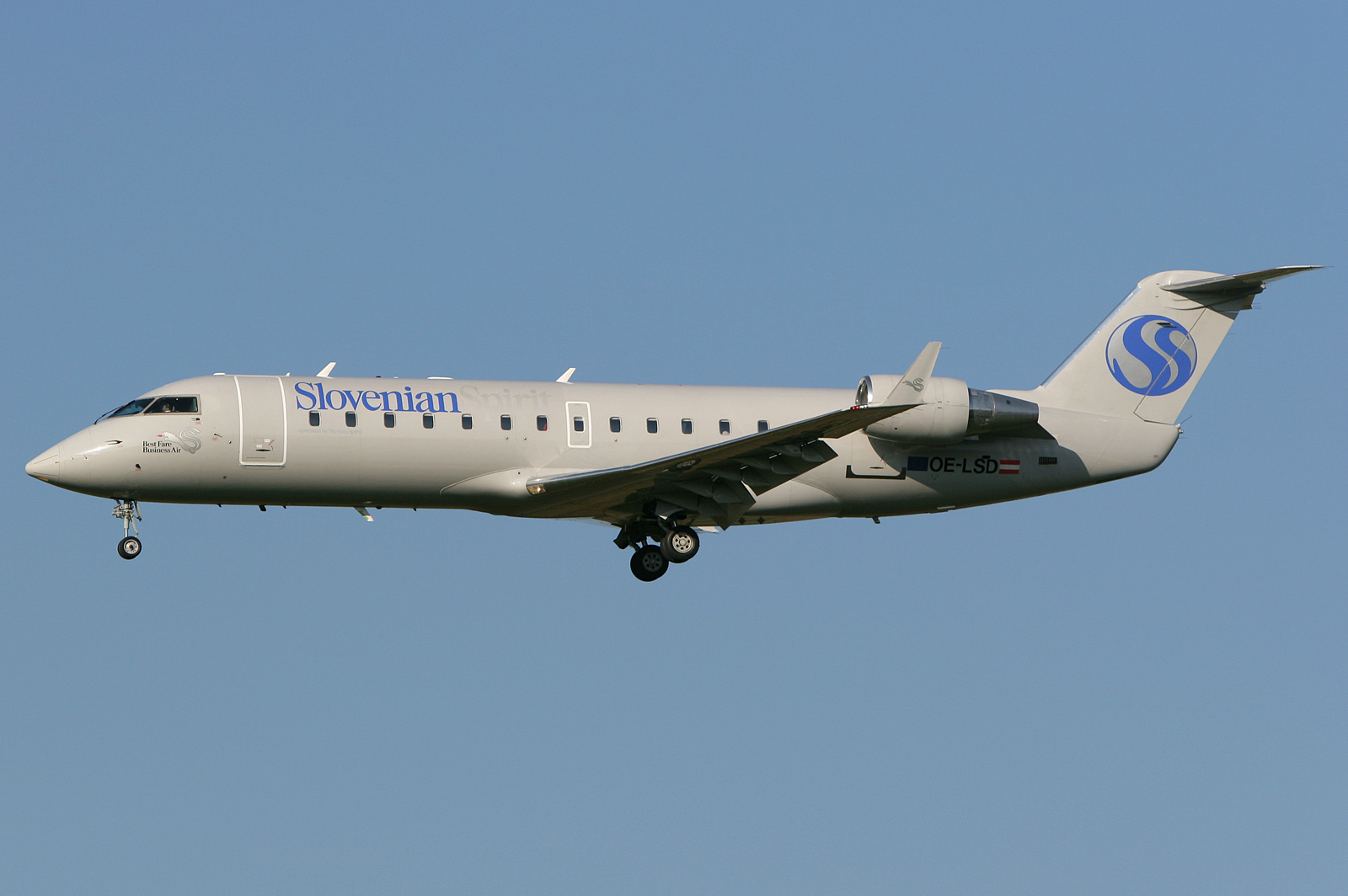
A Canadair CRJ200 in Slovenian Spirit colors

The airline was formed on December 25, 2002, by HGI Beteiligungs AG, which had been established in 2001. It started operations on March 24, 2003. Carinthian Spirit was also one of the brand names due to the participation of the state of Carinthia. The primary target group were business travellers, but at weekends there were also special offers for tourists.

The former Lauda Air manager and later FlyNiki CEO Otmar Lenz was a member of the Management Board from the company's foundation until December 2005. Andreas Rösslhuber then became a member of the board and was appointed as the reorganisation manager. However, due to the catastrophic economic circumstances, the reorganisation was not successful. At the end of March 2006 Salzburg Airport announced that it would contribute 1.5 million €uros to the airline.

== Insolvency and bankruptcy ==
In September 2005, at the instigation of Carinthian Governor Jörg Haider, Hypo-Alpe-Adria-Bank granted a loan of two million €uros without collateral to the airline, which was already in dire financial condition.

On March 24, 2006, Styrian Spirit abruptly canceled all flights and filed for insovency due to severe financial difficulties (debts of several million €uros). Bankruptcy proceedings were started on 28 March 2006. According to the insolvency administrator, the liabilities totalled around 9 million €uros. Styrian Spirit still owed Graz Airport and Salzburg Airport landing and handling fees for the last few months of operations. Graz Airport lost scheduled connections such as to Stuttgart and Zurich. Stuttgart has since been served by Austrian, while Zurich was taken over by Swiss at short notice. From 2007, Zurich was served by Robin Hood Aviation, which itself filed for insolvency in August 2011. Salzburg Airport also lost scheduled services to Zurich and Paris.

== Bankers' trial ==
The members of the Executive Board of Hypo Alpe Adria Bank, Wolfgang Kulterer and Gert Xander, were charged with breach of trust in this connection. In January 2013, the trial concerning the granting of loans by Hypo Alpe Adria to Styrian Spirit was resumed at the Regional Court of Klagenfurt. Both board members were subsequently sentenced to several years of prison.

== Destinations ==
Styrian Spirit final destinations prior to airline closure (December 2005): Austria

- Graz
- Salzburg
- Klagenfurt

Germany

- Berlin
- Stuttgart

France

- Paris

Poland

- Kraków

United Kingdom

- London-Luton

Slovenia

- Maribor

Switzerland

- Zürich

== Fleet ==
The airline operated a fleet of 4 Bombardier CRJ-200s and 1 Bombardier CRJ-700.
