= Linz Airport =

Airport in Hörsching, Austria

Linz Airport Flughafen Linz
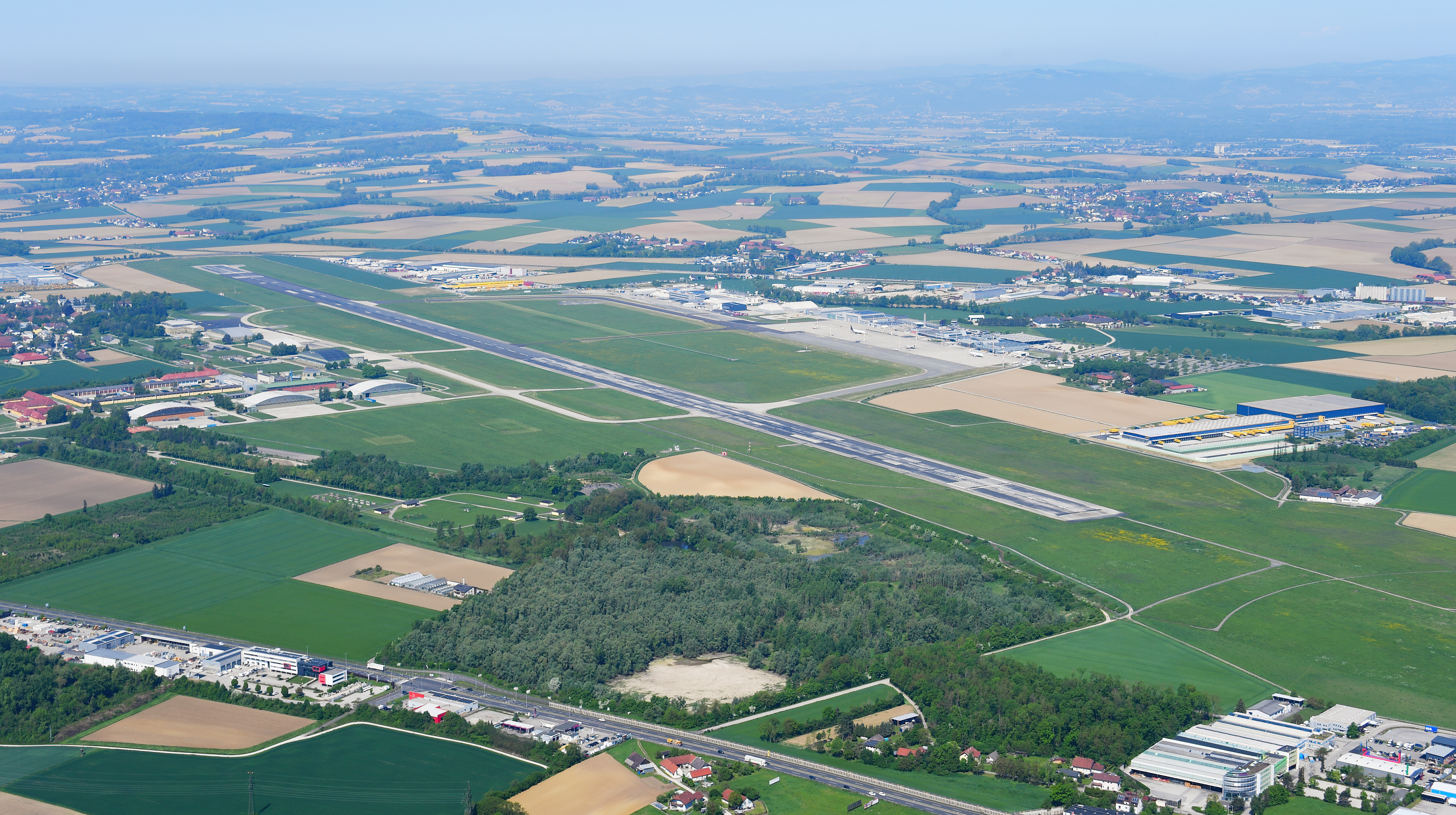
- IATA: LNZ; ICAO: LOWL

Summary
- Airport type: Public
- Operator: Flughafen Linz GesmbH
- Serves: Linz, Austria
- Location: Hörsching, Austria
- Elevation AMSL: 977 ft (298 m)
- Coordinates: 48°14′00″N 14°11′15″E
- Website: linz-airport.com/en

Map
- Location of airport in Austria

Runways
| Direction | Length | | Surface |
| Direction | ft | m | Surface |
|---|---|---|---|
| 08/26 | 9,842 | 3,000 | Asphalt |

Statistics (2025)
- Passengers: 262,347 ▲+45.4%
- Aircraft movements: 4,513 ▲+33.0%
- Cargo (metric tons): 15,214 ▼-0.3%
- Statistics

Linz Airport (German: Flughafen Linz, IATA: LNZ, ICAO: LOWL) is a minor international airport located in Hörsching, near Linz, the third-largest city in Austria. It was also known as the Blue Danube Airport until 2019.

== History ==
=== Early years ===
Air traffic used to take place at the Südbahnhofmarkt in the center of Linz where the zeppelin Estaric I took off on 30 October 1909. In 1925 air traffic was established between Linz and Vienna. Starting in 1934, the air traffic operation was based in the Linz-Katzenau district (nowadays industrial center), which was later terminated by the NSDAP after 1938. The airport was then moved to Hörsching.

The following table shows some of the units of the Luftwaffe (air force in Nazi Germany), which were deployed from 1943 to 1945.

| From | To | Unit |
|---|---|---|
| October 1943 | December 1943 | I./KG 51 (Bomber Wing 51) |
| November 1943 | March 1944 | III./KG 76 |
| October 1944 | April 1944 | II./KG(J) 27 |
| April 1945 | April 1945 | II./KG 51 |
| April 1945 | May 1945 | I./JG 52 (Fighter Wing 52) |

Since 1956 regular passenger air traffic takes place. Since 1966 daily flight connections to Frankfurt Airport are available.

=== Development since the 1970s ===
In 1972 a passenger terminal was built and was officially opened in 1976. Since 1985 the flight path is equipped with an Instrument landing system, category IIIb. In the years 1998 to 2003 the passenger terminal was adjusted and enlarged. In 2005 a new instrument landing system (ILS) was put into operation at runway 08/26.

Until 1989 the supersonic jet Concorde landed several times at the airport. Since the 90s some cargo flights were dispatched by the high-capacity transporter Antonov An-124 Ruslan. In 2003 the world's largest cargo aircraft Antonov An-225 landed in Austria, and it returned once again in 2021. On 2 June 2010 a Lufthansa Airbus A380-800 landed at Linz Airport, coming from Vienna and left for Munich.

Amerer Air operated from Linz airport from 1995 until 2009 and was the only cargo company in Austria. In June 1994 the cargo terminal 1 was completed. In October 2013 the cargo terminal 5 was put into operation. 6 million euros were invested in the new cargo terminal. With more than 100 companies, Linz Airport is the largest business park in Upper Austria. The Flughafen GmbH employs about 160 people.

According to a 2025 study by economist Teodoro Cocca of University Linz, the airport accounts for around 1,700 full-time jobs at the airport itself and across the surrounding region. The study was commissioned by the state of Upper Austria.

Linz Airport is the fifth largest airport in Austria by passenger numbers after Vienna, Salzburg, Innsbruck and Graz. The airport is a shared property. 50% belongs to Upper Austria state and 50% belongs to Linz city.

At the end of 2025, business representatives from Upper Austria proposed a model to take over the City of Linz’s shares in the airport, thereby partially privatizing it.

In February 2015, Austrian Airlines announced that they would reduce the domestic route between Linz and the capital Vienna from six down to two daily flights, as most travellers are expected to use the new and improved rail link between the two cities. Since the inauguration of the new rail services in December 2014, the direct journey from Linz central station to Vienna International Airport takes a mere 1:47 hours without change of trains. In September 2016, Austrian Airlines cut down the Linz-Vienna route again to only one flight per day and direction, stating extremely poor passenger numbers. Most travelers between Linz and Vienna now use the aforementioned rail link, as nearly one Railjet per hour departs for Vienna on which Austrian Airlines sells AirRail tickets as well.

Because of geopolitical crises and terrorist attacks in holiday destinations, the demand for package holiday has declined all over Europe. The blue danube airport noted a drop in the destinations of Egypt and Turkey. In cooperation with ARGE "Flieg from Linz", Ibiza and Burgas were therefore included in the summer program 2016 and Tenerife in the winter program. Due to an increasing demand, services to Greece and Egypt will be extended in 2018. Besides this, there will be direct flights to Rostock and Monastir again on a weekly basis starting from 2018.

In the first six months of 2018 the airport recorded a significant increase in numbers and a positive effect on passenger development. More than 200.000 passengers used Linz Airport for their trips. Compared to the first half of 2017, traveler traffic increased by 16.8%, which makes 30,879 passengers in total. The holiday travel segment grew by 42.2%. The connections via Frankfurt raised as Lufthansa operates by larger aircraft. Palma de Mallorca has become accessible five times a week, twice by Eurowings and three times by Laudamotion. The airport was able to expand its offer towards the Baltic Sea, making it the only federal airport in Austria to offer this destination. Other newly popular destinations are Turkey, Egypt and Greece. Due to an entire airstrip lockdown of the Salzburg Airport from end of April until end of May 2019, the daily Salzburg-Istanbul flights from Turkish Airlines are going to be translocated to Linz. The operation of this field trial could result a regular flight connection between Linz and Istanbul.

In summer 2019 Bulgarian Air Charter had launched its premiere from Linz airport with destinations to Bulgaria and Greece. Due to new and future destinations, the number of seats in charter flights was to be increased by 20%, from 80,000 to 95,000 seats. Also in 2019 the airport's operator dropped the alternative name Blue Danube Airport Linz and officially renamed itself as Linz Airport.

In August 2025, Austrian Airlines announced the termination of its flights to Frankfurt Airport by October 2025 due to the route being financially unsustainable, leading to the loss of Linz Airport's sole hub connection. This also comes as Linz Airport is in need of € 8 million in financial support from the city and state which is subject to review by the European Union. The state of Upper Austria, which is represented on the airport’s supervisory board as an owner, announced a new tender for the route.

At the beginning of February 2026, it became known that the scheduled route would be operated from March 29 by the Danish airline DAT A/S.

== Facilities ==
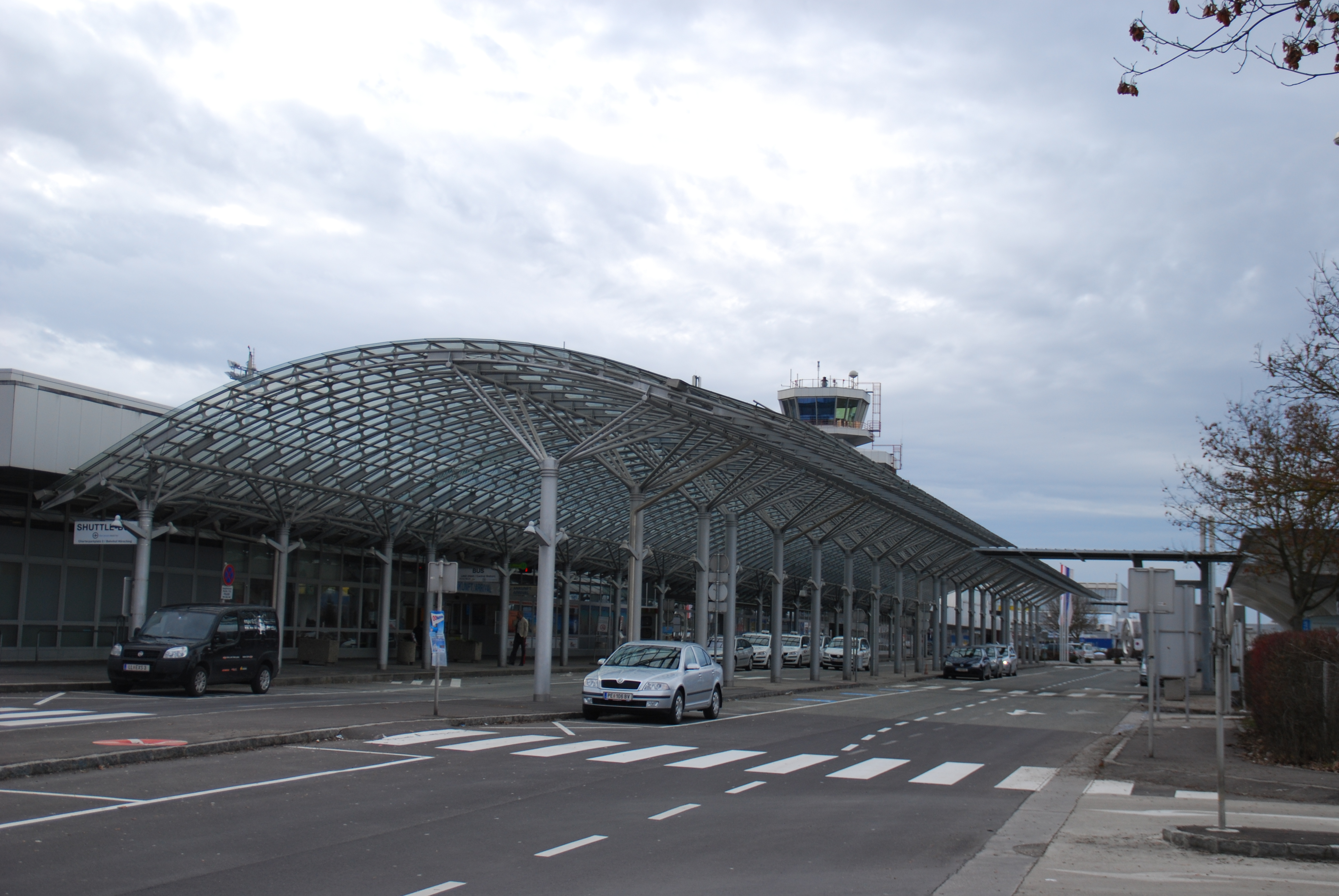
Terminal exterior

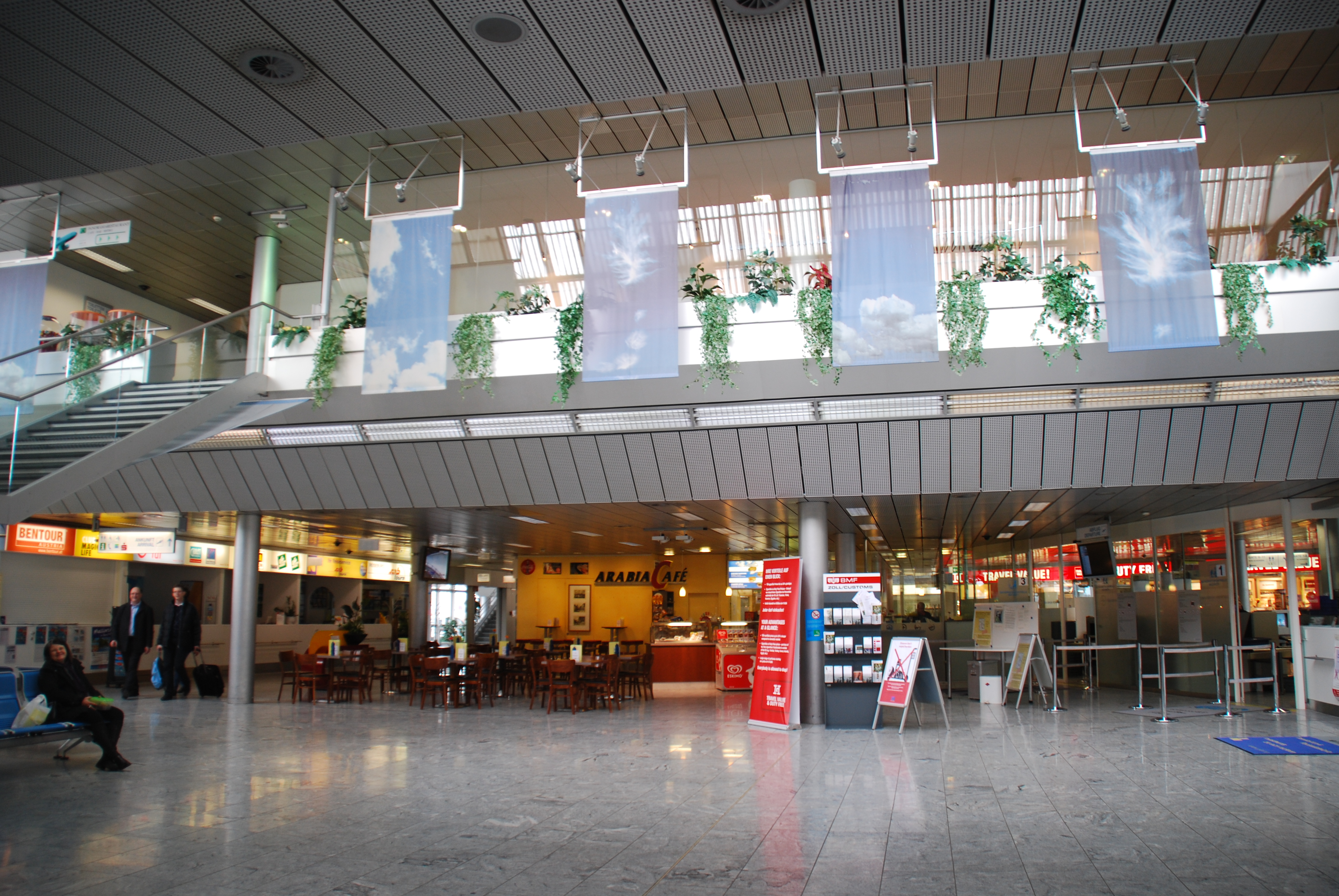
Main hall

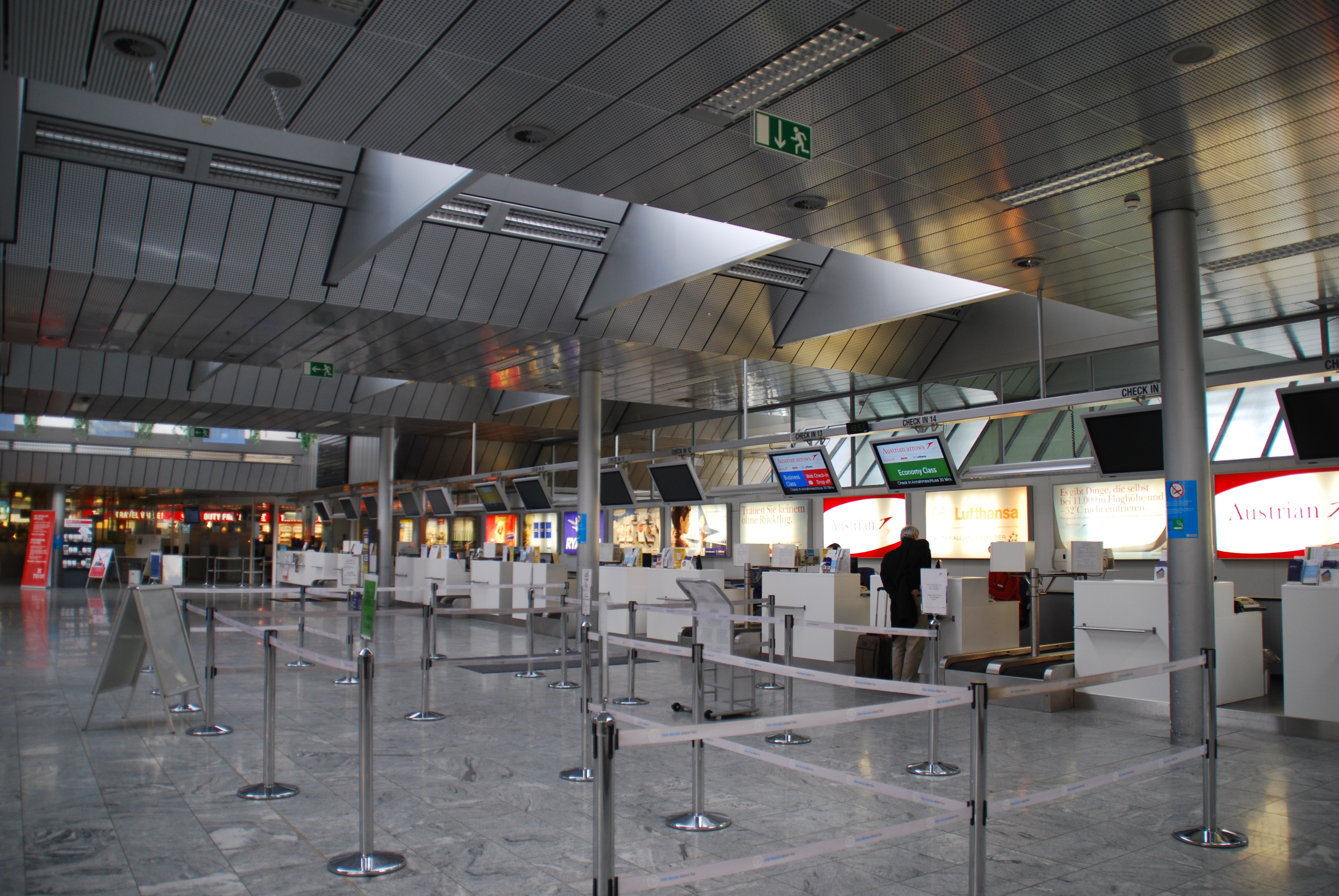
Check-in area

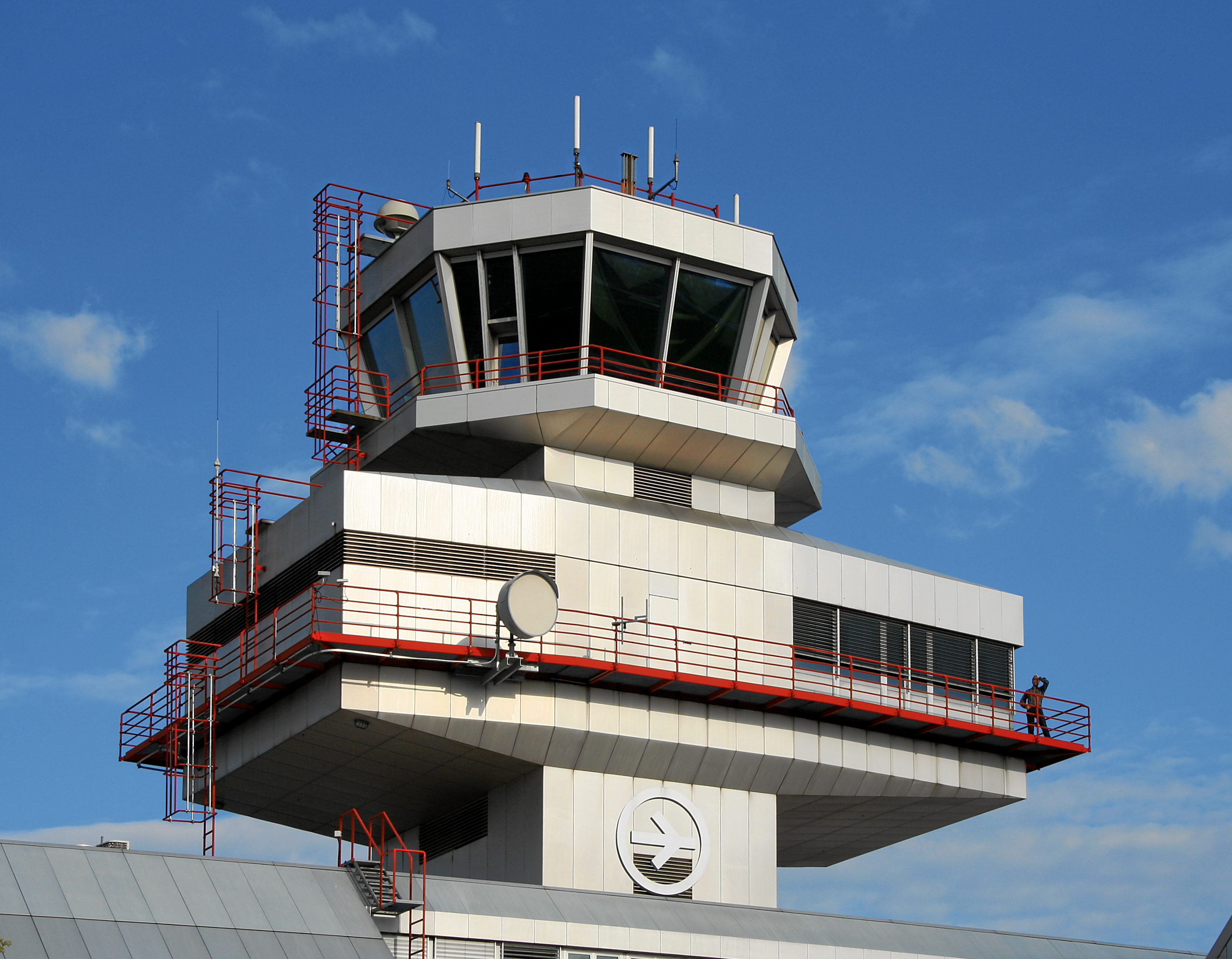
Control tower

=== Terminal ===
The airport covers an area of 383 hectares (946 acres) of land and features one passenger terminal, two runways and extensive logistics and maintenance facilities. Linz Airport is relatively small, with 11 gates. There is a shop and café in the entrance hall, connected to the check-in and airline desks. Beyond the security checks there is a duty-free shop and a small café accessible from both the domestic and international gate areas. The airport also has a roof terrace, which can be visited during the summer months between 6 and 23 o'clock to observe the airplanes. For guests of the airport the access is free of charge. The rooftop also has a playground for children. For so called plane spotters special viewing spots were created, where visiters are able to take pictures of the planes from a wide range of angles without having to worry about any annoying obstacles.

=== Runway and apron ===
The airport is equipped with a 3000 meter long precision runway with two instrumental landing systems, as well as a helicopter landing pad. For medium-haul aircraft 16 parking positions are available. Linz Airport is actually a military airport but with a civil right of use. The civil part is located north of the landing strip. To the south lie the second largest barracks of Austria as well as a military airfield named "Fliegerhorst Vogler". On 1 November 2010, both runway 09/27 and helicopter landing pad 07/25 were renamed to runway 08/26 and helicopter landing pad 07/25 due to permanent changes in the magnetic declination. Since the submitted variation of the compass rose results in such a magnetic value which lies closer to 08/26 than the existing identification code 09/27, the Austrian flight control Austro Control initiated the tracking of the new runway designation.

=== Freight facilities ===
The Cargo sector of the airport operates worldwide under the brand Air Cargo Center. In 2017 there was a significant cargo increase with a total of 53,796 tons of cargo. Thus the airport could strengthen its leading position as Austria's largest regional airport for cargo services and further increase cargo services by more than 20% compared to last year. Besides the daily rotation of DHL Aviation (Ljubljana – Linz – Leipzig) extra cargo transactions are often handled. The first cargo terminal was completed in 1994. A year later the new extensions was already in progress and opened finale in 1996. In 2000 followed the opening of the third cargo terminal. In June 2014 DHL Global Forwarding transported 9.5 tons of steel tiling from Linz to Mumbai by a Boeing 747-400F. Following the ongoing expansion of the cargo facilities and the opening of cargo terminal 5 on 17 October 2013, a building the size of 70x35 meters, a 2.900 m^{2} cargo hall, 12 loading bays as well as two sawtooth ramps were created. Linz Airport is also equipped to dispatch jumbo jets. Following the legal authorization in August 2017, DHL Express opened a new logistics center at the airport in June 2019. More than 25 million euros are invested in its construction. The merger aims to establish quality advantages and ensure increased safety standards. Due to modern building technology, more than 360 tons of CO_{2} are to be saved each year. In addition, there will be up to 180 more jobs through the new DHL location. In 2020 the airport collaborated with the "GrowNow Group" to start the German-language adult-education airfreight academy "Aviation Now". In February 2021 "Aviation Now" was nominated for an official IATA Regional Training Partnership.

=== General aviation ===
The General Aviation Center is housed in a separate terminal and coordinates among others the following points: Passport and customs checks, refueling, cleaning, defrosting as well as several other passenger and crew services. The airline pilot school AeronautX Luftfahrtschule is also located in the airport.

== Ownership ==
Linz airport is operated by Flughafen Linz GmbH, which is owned in equal parts by OÖ Verkehrsholding GmbH and city of Linz.

Since May 2018 Norbert Draskovits is managing director of the blue danube airport linz. His concept for ‘Linz Airport 2030’, his longtime professional experience and his industry-specific contacts convinced in the process of application. He was formerly head of management board and Vice President Commercial at FlyNiki. Draskovits, married and father of two adult children, replaces former managing director Gerhard Kunesch who is retiring.

== Airlines and destinations ==
=== Passenger ===
The following airlines offer regular scheduled and charter flights at Linz Airport:

| Airlines | Destinations |
|---|---|
| Corendon Airlines | Seasonal: Antalya, Heraklion, Hurghada |
| DAT | Frankfurt |
| Eurowings | Seasonal: Kos, Palma de Mallorca |
| Ryanair | Alicante, London–Stansted (ends 28 October 2026); Seasonal: Bari |

=== Cargo ===
| Airlines | Destinations |
|---|---|
| Amazon Air | Madrid |
| DHL Aviation | Leipzig/Halle, Ljubljana |
| Turkish Cargo | Istanbul |

== Statistics ==
In terms of passenger figures the airport is ranked as number five of the six commercial airports in Austria. These numbers are quoted according to Austria's traffic statistics.

| Year | Passengers | Aircraft operations | Air cargo (metric tons) | Total cargo (incl. road feeder service, metric tons) |
|---|---|---|---|---|
| 2005 | 726,529 | 13,955 | 384 | 31,829 |
| 2006 | 762,094 | 12,705 | 404 | 33,862 |
| 2007 | 773,114 | 14,282 | 1,505 | 34,661 |
| 2008 | 803,163 | 15,674 | 5,181 | 36,540 |
| 2009 | 682,945 | 13,881 | 5,709 | 33,325 |
| 2010 | 692,039 | 13,688 | 6,558 w/o | 44,809 |
| 2011 | 679,220 | 10,669 | 8,341 w/o | 47,341 |
| 2012 | 623,385 | 10,894 | 8,283 w/o | 42,974 |
| 2013 | 549,961 | 10,227 | 9,531 w/o | 42,987 |
| 2014 | 561,295 | 10,433 | 10,994 w/o | 44,414 |
| 2015 | 529,785 | 8,365 | 10,329 w/o | 45,985 |
| 2016 | 435,468 | 10,433 | 10,994 w/o | 44,881 |
| 2017 | 402.007 | 6.890 | 10.255 w/o | 53.976 |
| 2018 | 465.798 | 6.932 | 8.298 w/o | 52.414 |
| 2019 | 436.018 | 6.493 | 8.122 w/o | 46.797 |
| 2020 | 51.306 | 2.022 | 11.147 w/o | 42.286 |
| 2021 | 68.509 | 2.240 | 17.061 w/o | 62.597 |
| 2022 | 207.766 | 3.884 | 12.648 w/o | 55.429 |
| 2023 | 232.950 | 3.752 | 12.170 w/o | 44.342 |
| 2024 | 180.694 | 3.393 | 15.265 w/o | 49.000 |
| 2025 | 262,347 | 4,513 | 15,214 w/o | 47.865 |

== Accidents and incidents ==
The database of the Aviation Safety Network collects all fatal flight accidents worldwide since 1943. There are no registered accidents in the closer area of Linz Airport since the last update in 2014.

- On 8 January 1968, Douglas C-47B YU-ABK of Jugoslovenski Aerotransport was operating an international scheduled cargo flight from Riem Airport, Munich, West Germany to Pleso Airport, Zagreb, Yugoslavia when a fire developed in one of the engines. An attempt was made to divert to Hörsching Airport but the aircraft force landed short of the airport in a forest at Sankt Florian. All four people on board survived.

== Access ==
=== Bus ===
Bus line 601 connects the airport within 20 minutes with the city centre of Linz. There is an additional free shuttle service for travellers from Hörsching railway station which itself can be reached from Linz main station.

=== Car ===
The airport can be reached via federal highways B139 (which connects to motorway A1 Vienna – Germany) and B1. Taxis and car rental facilities are available at the airport. There are three short-stay and schedule car parks, which offer place for 1,050 cars. Additionally, there are two large car parks with 2,300 parking spaces which are located at the side of the terminal. Passengers can use a shuttle service that takes them to the departure hall. EV charging stations for e-cars, e-bikes, and Segways are available at the K2 short-term car park.

== Environment ==
=== URIS ===
The blue danube airport linz gets support from the URIS (Umfeld Rückkoppelungs- und Informations-System)- Council in its environmental concerns. The council was founded in 1999 and works as a neutral contact point for all neighboring communities.

=== Aircraft noise measurement ===
At the end of 2003 three new noise monitoring stations have been set up in the region of Linz airport, which measure and record around the clock the current sound level. The two stationary stations (Oftering and Traun) as well as the mobile measuring trailer were purchased from the Blue Danube Airport to complement the existing aircraft nose measurements. The stationary stations are 2,500 m (fire brigade Oftering) or 3,000 m (cemetery Linz) away from the nearest slope. The environmental protection department of Upper Austria analyzes the results and documents them in regular reports. The current maximum value is 87.2 dB (civil) and 93.7 dB (military) in Oftering, 89.2 dB (civil) and 94.0 dB (military) in Traun and 81.8 dB (civil) and 87.0 dB (military) at the mobile station (status 2014).

=== Safety ===
The airport has its own fire department whose area of responsibility is stated in national and international guidelines. The fire department has six cars with a total of 37,000 liters of water and 4500 kg foam or powder. In December 2017, the blue danube airport was awarded the EU certificate by the EASA (European Aviation Safety Agency). The certificate confirms the quality and compliance with high safety standards in airport operations and for passengers. The Vienna International Airport, as well as Graz, Innsbruck, Klagenfurt, Linz, Salzburg and the Bad Vöslau Airport are also holders of the EASA certificate.

== Trivia ==
The Runway Night Run is a 5 km long running event which takes place on the slopes of the Blue Danube Airport in Linz. Individuals as well as teams of three can participate. The starters of the teams are also included in the individual competition. The start and finish of the event are located at the Northwest corner of the shelf. The route runs along the apron of the taxiway "Foxtrot" to the runway. The turning point is in the east at the end of the runway "08". Then the course heads south to the runway "26" which leads west to the taxiway "Golf" and finally to the finish line. Apart from the location, the beginning at exactly midnight is a special feature of the event.

The DHL airport NIGHT RUN 2019 took place on 30 August 2019. The airport director, Mag. Norbert Draskovits, was on the starting line to complete the 5 km run, alongside 2.500 participants. The DHL LINZ AIRPORT NIGHT RUN 2020 was held on October 9, with a limited number of participants due to the current Covid crisis,. The 239 runners were additionally split into separate starting blocks. The Airport Night Run 2021 is scheduled for August 6, 2021. On 9 May 2020 sailplane pilot Rudolf Schlesinger conducted a Touch & Go maneuver at Linz Airport. It was the first successful Touch & Go maneuver with a glider at an international airport.

In cooperation with local flying clubs, private accompanied trial flights can also be conducted on the premises of Linz Airport.

In August 2025, a gigantic chandelier for the Center for Islamic Civilization in Tashkent was flown from Linz to Uzbekistan on two Boeing 747 cargo planes.

== See also ==
- Transport in Austria
- List of airports in Austria
