= Fairline =

Austrian regional airline (2003–2004)

Fairline Luftfahrt GmbH & CoKG

- Saab 340
IATA	ICAO	Call sign
-	-	Fairline
- Founded: 2003
- Ceased operations: 2004
- Hubs: Airport Graz-Thalerhof
- Fleet size: 1
- Destinations: 5
- Headquarters: Feldkirchen, Austria
- Website: www.fly-fair.com

Fairline was a regional airline based in Austria which flew schedules to Italian and German destinations.

== History ==
The airline was established in 2003 out of Teamline Air assets and started operations in January 2004 with Saab 340 twin-turboprop regional airliners. It ceased operations in the month of June of that same year after its parent company Fairline Aviation was declared bankrupt on June 9, 2004 by a court in Graz.

== Destinations ==
Fairline operated the following scheduled services from Graz and Linz:

- Berlin (Berlin-Tegel Airport), once a week
- Rome (Ciampino Airport), four times weekly
- Milan (Malpensa Airport), six times weekly
- Florence (Peretola Airport), three times weekly
- Berlin (Berlin-Tegel Airport), once a week
- Stuttgart (Stuttgart Airport), once a week
