= 13th FAI World Rally Flying Championship =

Flying Championship held in Rustenburg, South Africa

13th FAI World Rally Flying Championship took place between 26 July – 3 August 2003 in Rustenburg in South Africa.

There were 51 crews from 14 countries: South Africa (7), Poland (4), France (4), Czech Republic (4), Austria (6), United Kingdom (6), Germany (6), Russia (3), Spain (3), Chile (3), Greece (2), Hungary (1), Cyprus (1), Portugal (1).

== Contest ==
First navigation competition:

1. Nigel Hopkins / Dale de Klerk ZAF - 324 penal points
2. Philippe Odeon / Philippe Muller FRA - 344 pts
3. Krzysztof Wieczorek / Wacław Wieczorek POL - 418 pts

Second navigation competition:

1. Nigel Hopkins / Dale de Klerk ZAF - 166 pts
2. Nathalie Strube / Patrick Sicard FRA - 538 pts
3. M. Lifshits / Dmitri Sukharev RUS - 576 pts

Third navigation competition:

1. Jiří Filip / Michal Filip CZE - 168 pts
2. Janusz Darocha / Zbigniew Chrząszcz POL - 188 pts
3. Adrian Pilling / Renier Moolman ZAF - 188 pts

== Results ==
=== Individual ===
Pilot / navigator; country; penal points for observation + navigation + landings

1.	Nigel Hopkins / Dale de Klerk	ZAF	350 + 192 + 210 = 752
2.	Janusz Darocha / Zbigniew Chrząszcz	POL	575 + 580 + 250 = 1405
3.	Nathalie Strube / Patrick Sicard	FRA	900 + 356 + 200 = 1456
4.	Joël Tremblet / Jose Bertanier	FRA	550 + 738 + 360 = 1648
5.	Jiří Filip / Michal Filip	CZE	650 + 806 + 210 = 1666
6.	Petr Opat / Václav Pojer	CZE	1200 + 416 + 150 = 1766
7.	Hubert Huber / Johannes Cserveny	AUT	800 + 788 + 200 = 1788
8.	Michał Bartler / Michał Wieczorek	POL	775 + 856 + 180 = 1811
9.	Adrian Pilling / Renier Moolman	ZAF	1050 + 672 + 120 = 1842
10.	Michel Frere / Frédérick Saquet	FRA	850 + 868 + 240 = 1958

=== Team ===
Counted two best crews (number of penal points):

1. ZAF - 2594
2. FRA - 3104
3. POL - 3216
4. CZE - 3432
5. AUT - 5466
6. GBR - 5954
7. ESP - 6244
8. DEU - 6706
9. CHL - 8791
10. RUS - 11097
11. GRC - 20414

== Trivia ==
It was the first FAI World Rally Flying Championship since the 5th FAI World Rally Flying Championship in 1986, not won by the Poles.
