= Lauda Air =

Charter airline of Austria (1979–2013)

Lauda Air Luftfahrt GmbH

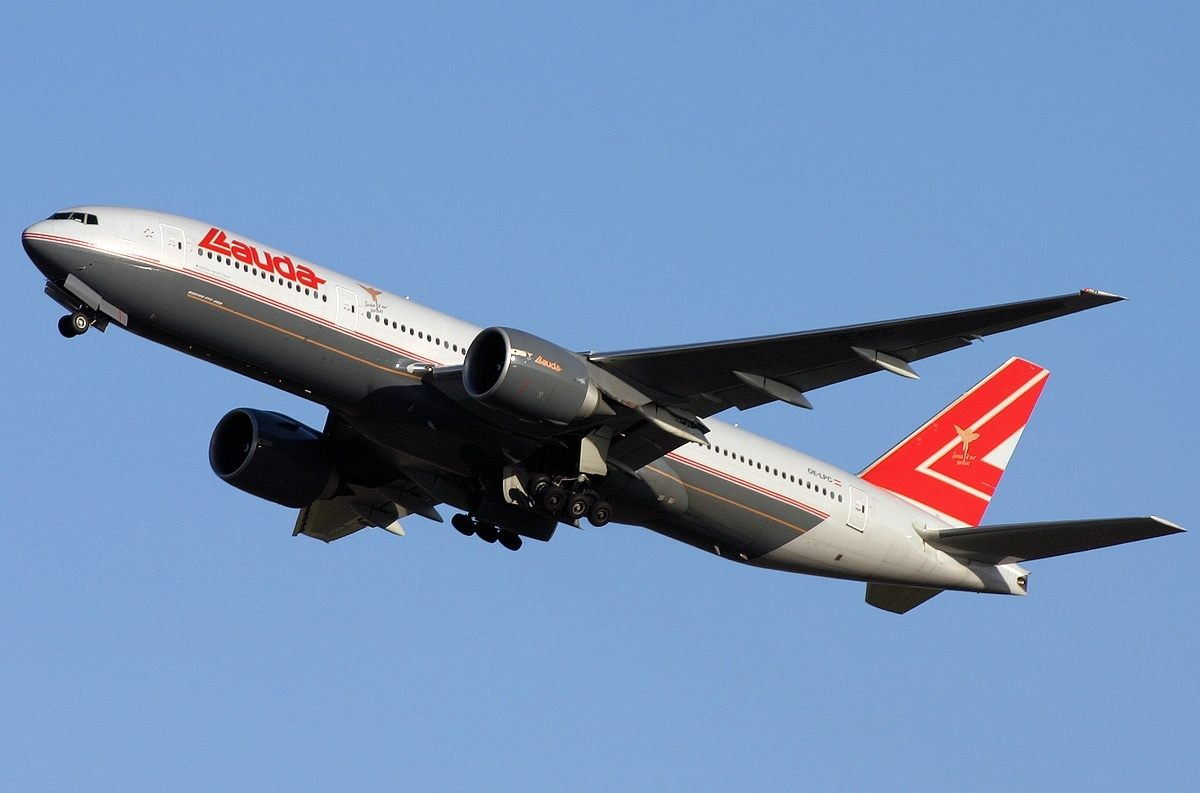
- Boeing 777-200ER
IATA	ICAO	Call sign
NG	LDA	LAUDA AIR
- Founded: April 1979
- Commenced operations: 1985
- Ceased operations: 1 July 2012 (merged into Austrian Airlines)
- Operating bases: Graz; Innsbruck; Linz; Vienna
- Frequent-flyer program: LaudaPoints; Miles & More
- Alliance: Star Alliance (affiliate; 2000–2013)
- Subsidiaries: Lauda Air Italy (1991–2005); Lauda Asia Airways (1992–2004)
- Parent company: Austrian Airlines Group
- Headquarters: Schwechat, Lower Austria
- Key people: Jaan Albrecht (CEO); Karsten Benz (CCO)
- Founder: Niki Lauda

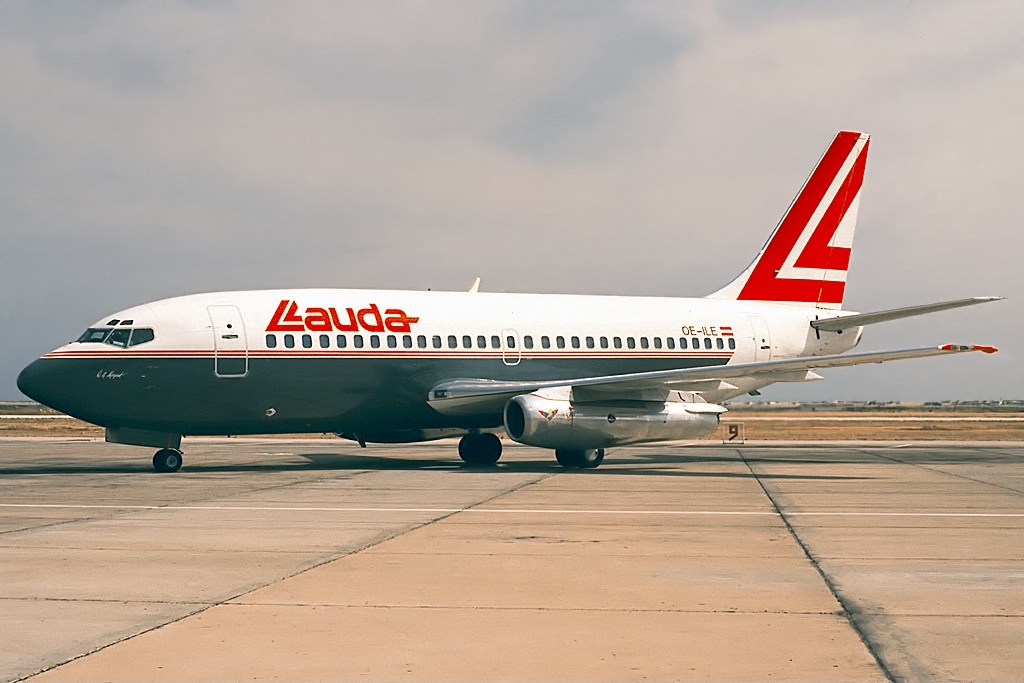
Boeing 737-200

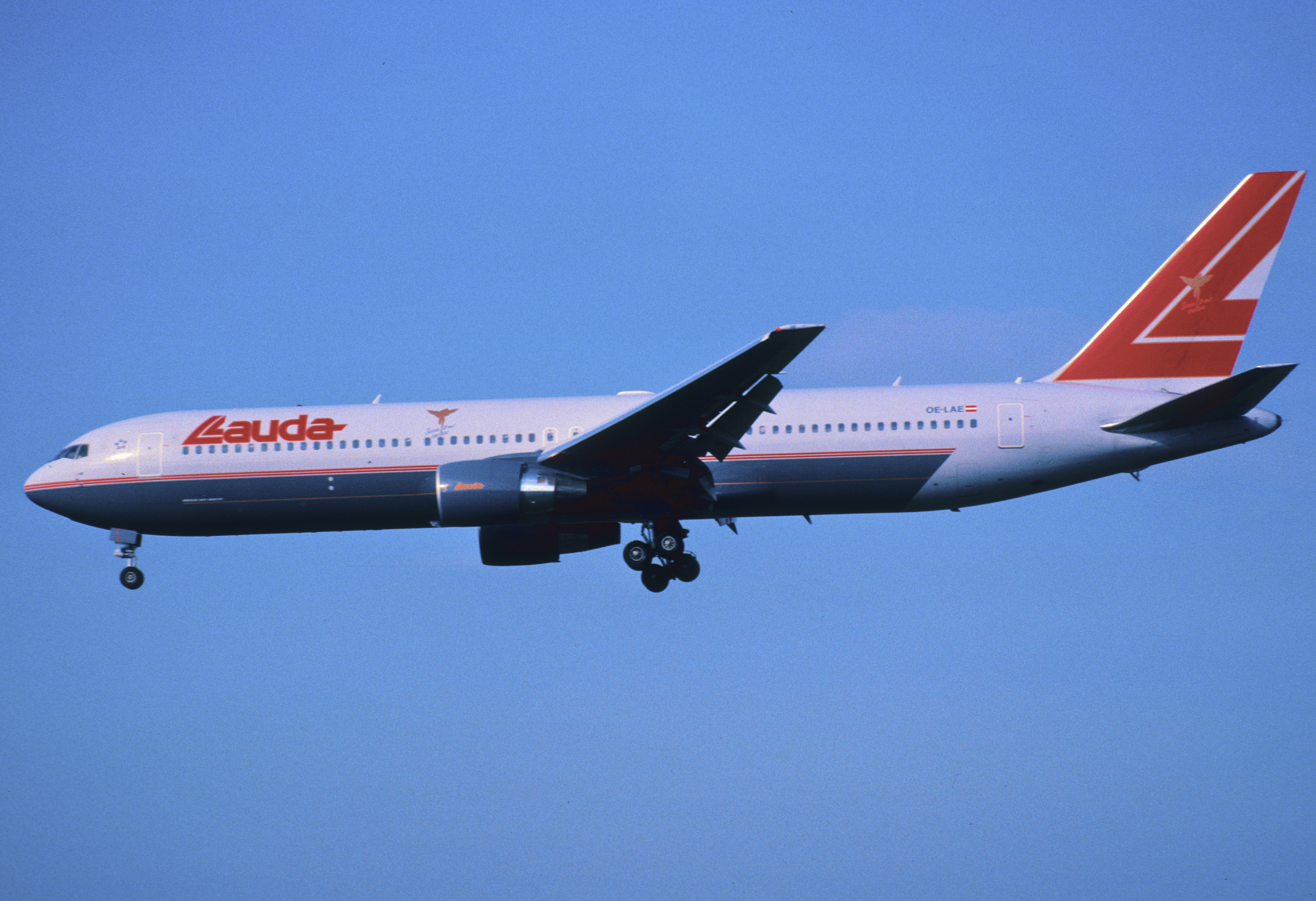
Boeing 767-300ER

Lauda Air was an Austrian charter airline headquartered at Vienna International Airport in Schwechat. It was owned by Niki Lauda (1949–2019) during much of its existence, later becoming a charter airline subsidiary for leisure operations of Austrian Airlines. On 6 April 2013, Lauda Air ceased to exist and was replaced by Austrian myHoliday, a new brand name that is used for flights and leisure offers provided by Austrian Airlines.

== History ==
=== Development as an independent airline ===
Lauda Air was established in April 1979 by former Formula One world motor racing champion Niki Lauda with two Fokker F27s. Flight operations were launched in the following month of May. Charter operations continued until 1983, with the adoption of increasingly larger aircraft. A period of hiatus followed until 1985, when large-scale charter flights resumed. In that year, ITAS Austria purchased a 49% share. Scheduled services began in May 1988. In 1991, the fleet consisted of two Boeing 737-300s, two Boeing 767-300ERs and a Learjet 36.

In May 1988, Lauda started its first long-haul flights from Vienna to Sydney and Melbourne via Bangkok. In the 1990s, it started to fly its Sydney and Melbourne flights via Kuala Lumpur and Bali. Daily flights to Dubai, Cuba, and Miami via Munich followed starting from August 1990.

Accelerated market penetration within Europe was made by the signing of a strategic alliance with Lufthansa in 1992, consolidated in the following year. At the same time, the first Bombardier CRJ-100s were taken into service, required for intra-European connections and to Scandinavia. Also in 1992, Lauda established its subsidiary, Lauda Asia Airways, in legal status to Taiwan, like Japan Asia Airways.

=== Merger with Austrian Airlines ===
In December 2000 Austrian Airlines purchased a 47% shareholding in Lauda Air. By 2001 this had increased to 67%. In 2005 the flight operations merged with Austrian Airlines, and the brand "Lauda Air" operated charter flights within the Austrian Airlines Group.

At an AAG board meeting in November 2006, plans were approved to retire the Airbus wide-bodied fleet by mid-2007 and to operate with just a Boeing 767 and Boeing 777 fleet. As a result of subsequent fleet cuts, Austrian Airlines suspended some long-haul services and Lauda Air withdrew from the long-haul charter market over the next year. This led to a refocus on the short/medium-haul market and led to the addition of a 737-800 to take over most of the charter routes. Lauda Air also had an Italian subsidiary, Lauda Air Italy, which ended its operations in 2007.

Lauda Air was officially merged into Austrian Airlines on 1 July 2012. All aircraft within the group were transferred to Austrian Airlines on 1 July 2012, to be able to take advantage of Austrian Airlines structure.

The brand was retired at the start of the summer flight schedule on 31 March 2013, and was replaced by "Austrian myHoliday". It is no longer an airline but a brand used to sell Austrian Airlines' own leisure offers.

== Destinations ==
Austrian Airlines regularly served various destinations under the Lauda Air brand until March 2013.

=== Former destinations ===
These destinations were served by Lauda Air before its cessation of operations and its 2012 merger into Austrian Airlines:

Country	City	Airport	Notes
Australia	Melbourne	Melbourne Airport	Terminated
Australia	Sydney	Sydney Airport	Terminated
Austria	Graz	Graz Airport	Focus city
Austria	Innsbruck	Innsbruck Airport	Focus city
Austria	Linz	Linz Airport	Focus city
Austria	Salzburg	Salzburg Airport	
Austria	Vienna	Vienna International Airport	Hub
Brazil	Maceió	Zumbi dos Palmares International Airport	Terminated
Egypt	Hurghada	Hurghada International Airport	
Egypt	Luxor	Luxor International Airport	
Egypt	Sharm El Sheikh	Sharm El Sheikh International Airport	
France	Nice	Nice Côte d'Azur Airport	Terminated
France	Paris	Orly Airport	Terminated
Germany	Düsseldorf	Düsseldorf Airport	Terminated
Germany	Frankfurt	Frankfurt Airport	Terminated
Germany	Munich	Munich Airport	Terminated
Greece	Chania	Chania International Airport	Seasonal
Greece	Corfu	Corfu International Airport	Seasonal
Greece	Heraklion	Heraklion International Airport	Seasonal
Greece	Karpathos	Karpathos Island National Airport	Seasonal
Greece	Kavala	Kavala International Airport	Seasonal
Greece	Kefalonia	Kefalonia International Airport	Seasonal
Greece	Kos	Kos International Airport	Seasonal
Greece	Mykonos	Mykonos Airport	Seasonal
Greece	Mytilene	Mytilene International Airport	Seasonal
Greece	Preveza	Aktion National Airport	Seasonal
Greece	Rhodes	Rhodes International Airport	Seasonal
Greece	Samos	Samos International Airport	Seasonal
Greece	Santorini	Santorini International Airport	Seasonal
Greece	Skiathos	Skiathos International Airport	Seasonal
Greece	Thessaloniki	Thessaloniki Airport	Seasonal
Greece	Volos	Nea Anchialos National Airport	Seasonal
Greece	Zakynthos	Zakynthos International Airport	Seasonal
Hong Kong	Hong Kong	Hong Kong International Airport	Terminated
Hong Kong	Hong Kong	Kai Tak Airport	Airport closed
Iceland	Reykjavík	Keflavik International Airport	Seasonal
Indonesia	Denpasar	Ngurah Rai International Airport	Terminated
Ireland	Dublin	Dublin Airport	Seasonal
Italy	Cagliari	Cagliari Elmas Airport	
Italy	Catania	Catania–Fontanarossa Airport	Seasonal
Italy	Milan	Milan Malpensa Airport	Terminated
Italy	Naples	Naples International Airport	Seasonal
Italy	Olbia	Olbia Costa Smeralda Airport	
Italy	Rome	Rome Fiumicino Airport	Terminated
Italy	Tortolì	Tortolì Airport	
Jamaica	Montego Bay	Sangster International Airport	Terminated
Malaysia	Kuala Lumpur	Kuala Lumpur International Airport	Terminated
Maldives	Malé	Velana International Airport	Terminated
Mexico	Cancún	Cancún International Airport	Terminated
Portugal	Faro	Faro Airport	Seasonal
Portugal	Funchal	Madeira Airport	Seasonal
Portugal	Lisbon	Lisbon Airport	Terminated
Singapore	Singapore	Changi Airport	Terminated
Slovakia	Bratislava	Bratislava Airport	Terminated
Slovakia	Poprad	Poprad–Tatry Airport	Terminated
Spain	Barcelona	Josep Tarradellas Barcelona–El Prat Airport	Seasonal
Spain	Fuerteventura	Fuerteventura Airport	
Spain	Las Palmas	Gran Canaria Airport	
Spain	Madrid	Madrid–Barajas Airport	Terminated
Spain	Málaga	Málaga Airport	Seasonal
Spain	Lanzarote	Lanzarote Airport	Seasonal
Spain	Tenerife	Tenerife South Airport	
Sri Lanka	Colombo	Bandaranaike International Airport	Terminated
Thailand	Bangkok	Don Mueang International Airport	Terminated
Thailand	Phuket	Phuket International Airport	Terminated
Turkey	Antalya	Antalya Airport	
Turkey	Bodrum	Milas–Bodrum Airport	Seasonal
Turkey	Dalaman	Dalaman Airport	Seasonal
United Arab Emirates	Dubai	Dubai International Airport	Terminated
United Kingdom	London	Gatwick Airport	Terminated
United Kingdom	London	Heathrow Airport	Terminated
United Kingdom	Manchester	Manchester Airport	Terminated
United States	Los Angeles	Los Angeles International Airport	Terminated
United States	Miami	Miami International Airport	Terminated
Vietnam	Ho Chi Minh City	Tan Son Nhat International Airport	Terminated

== Fleet ==
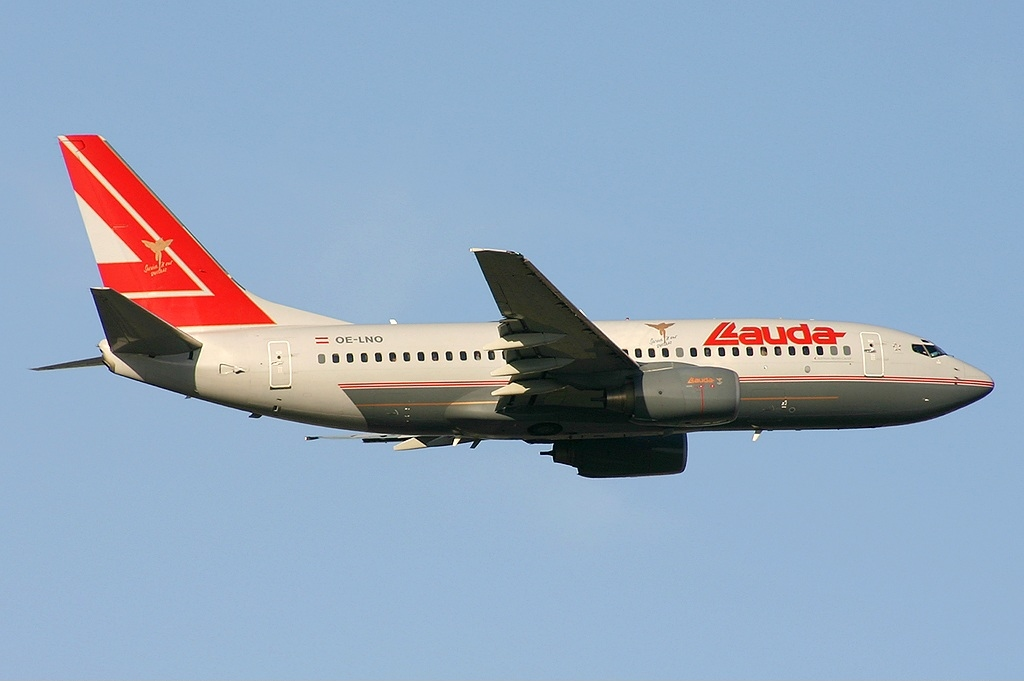
Lauda Boeing 737-700

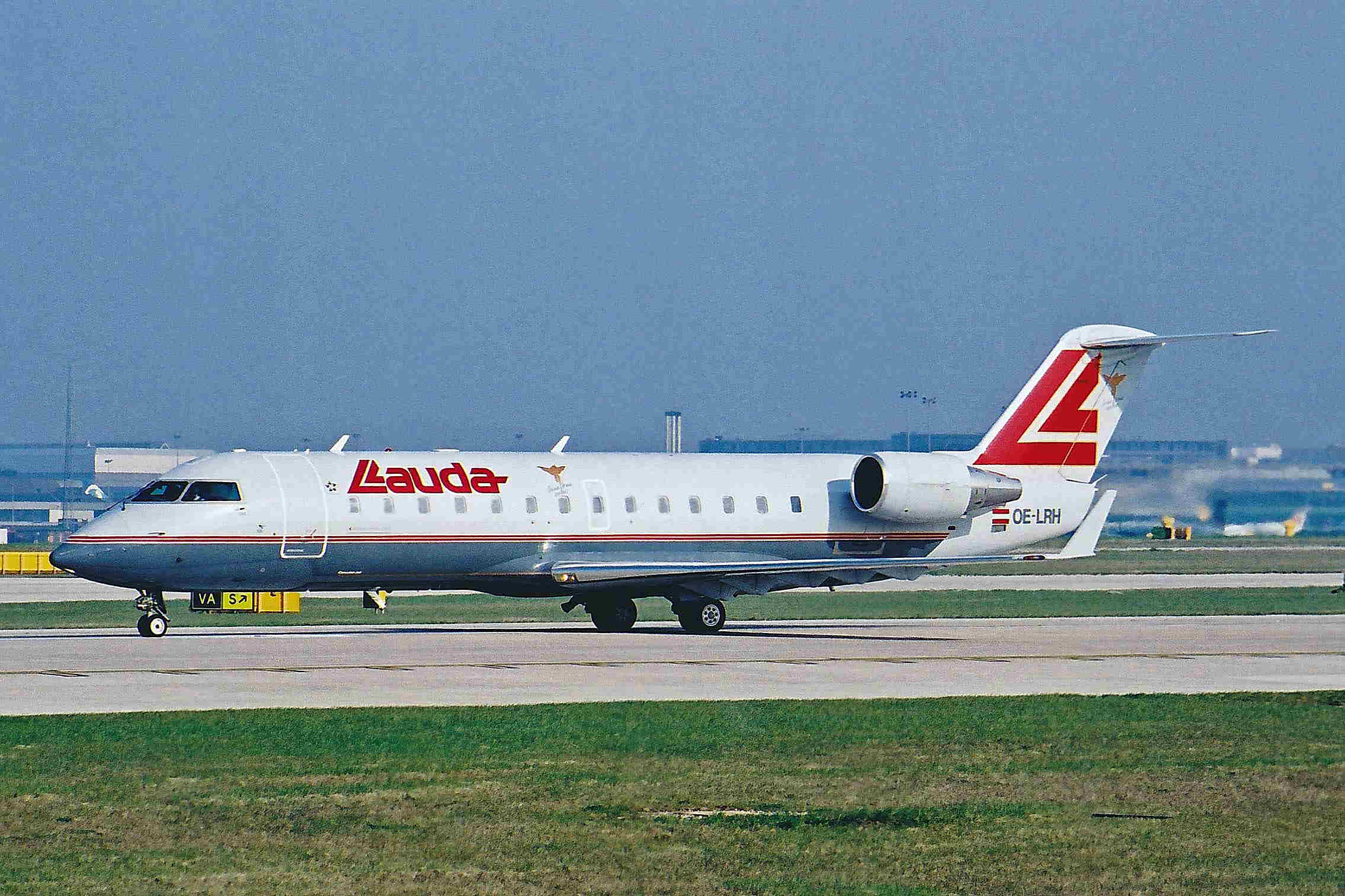
Bombardier CRJ-100

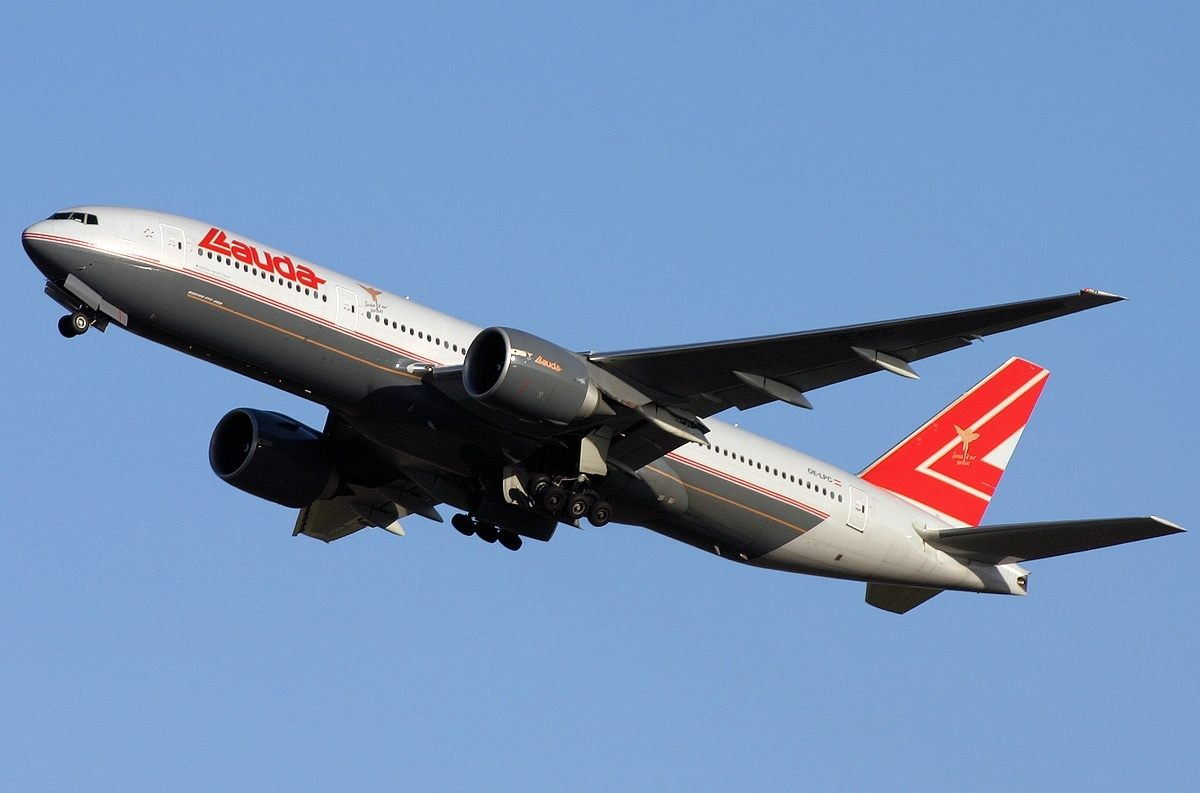
Lauda Boeing 777-200ER

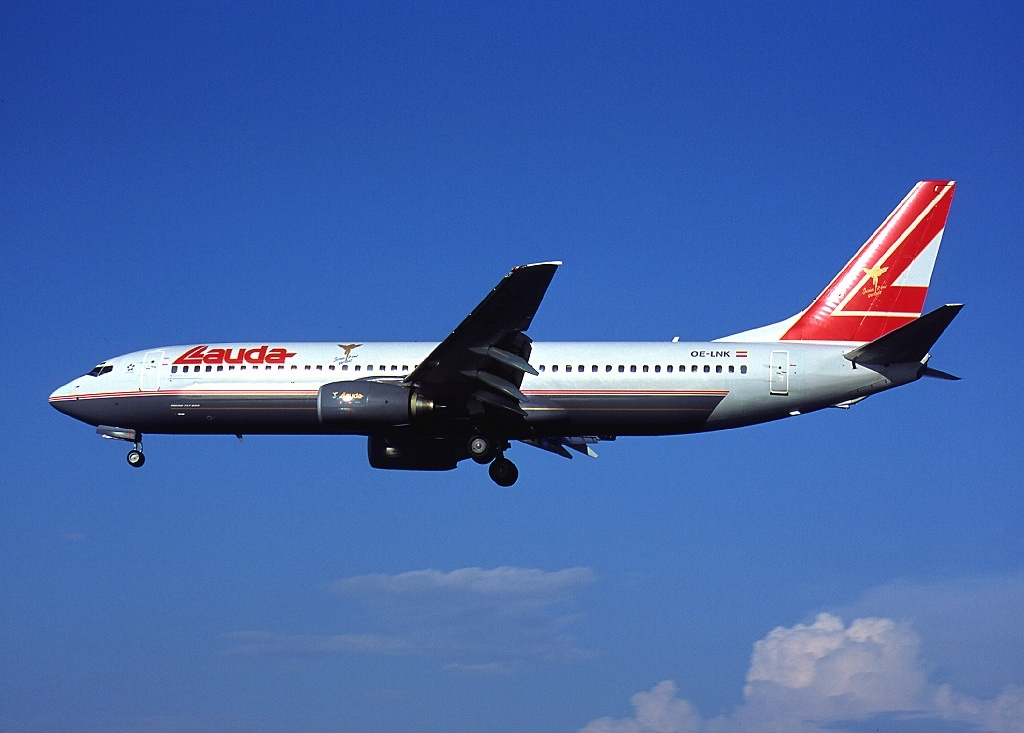
Boeing 737-800

=== Historic fleet ===
Lauda Air's historic fleet included the following aircraft during its existence:

Lauda Air's historic fleet
Aircraft	Total	Introduced	Retired	Notes
Airbus A320-200	2	2005	2008	Leased from Austrian Airlines.
BAC 1-11-500	2	1985	1986	Leased from TAROM.
Boeing 737-200	1	1985	1988	Leased from Transavia.
Boeing 737-300	2	1988	2005	
Boeing 737-400	3	1993	2005	
Boeing 737-600	6	2000	2009	Transferred to Austrian Airlines.
Boeing 737-700	2	2001	2010	Transferred to Austrian Airlines.
Boeing 737-800	7	1998	2012	Transferred to Austrian Airlines.
Boeing 767-300ER	1	1989	1991	OE-LAV crashed as Flight 004.
Boeing 767-300ER	10	1989	2007	Launch customer with Pratt & Whitney PW4000 engines. Six transferred to Austrian Airlines.
Boeing 777-200ER	3	1997	2005	Transferred to Austrian Airlines.
Bombardier CRJ-100	10	1994	2004	Relocated to Austrian Arrows.
Fokker F27 Friendship		1985	1994	

=== Lauda Air Executive ===
Lauda Air also operated a fleet of three small jets, a Cessna Citation II (9 seats), a Bombardier Lear 60 (7 seats), and a Dassault Falcon 20 (12 seats). These were available for private charter flights.

== Incidents and accidents ==
Lauda Air suffered one fatal accident during its existence:

- On 26 May 1991, Lauda Air Flight 004, operated by a Boeing 767-300ER registered as OE-LAV, named after Wolfgang Amadeus Mozart, crashed in Thailand shortly after take-off from Don Mueang International Airport in Bangkok, due to the uncommanded deployment of one of its thrust reversers. This accident resulted in the deaths of all 223 passengers and crew.
