= 2005 Iranian Air Force C-130 crash =

Air crash in Tehran

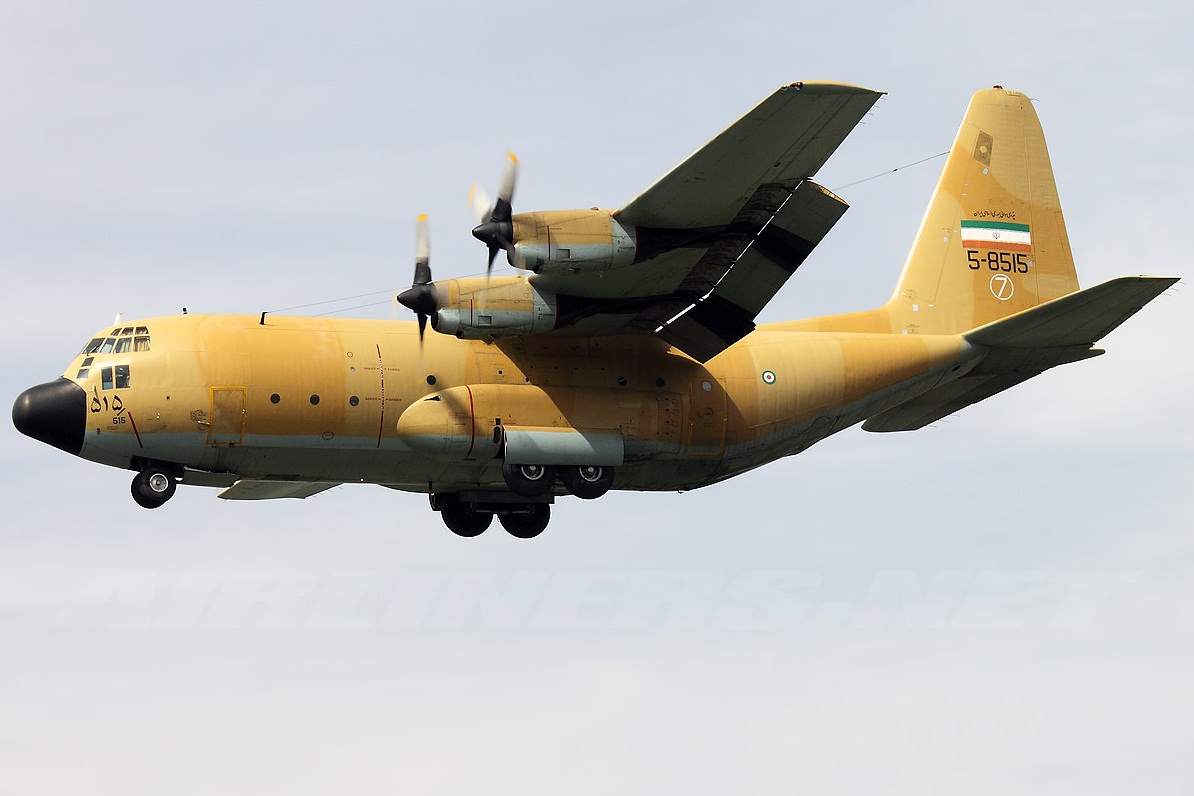
- An Iranian air force C-130E Hercules similar to the aircraft that crashed

Accident
- Date: December 6, 2005
- Summary: Crashed into structure
- Site: Near Mehrabad International Airport, Tehran, Iran; 35°40′16.56″N 51°20′45.34″E
- Total fatalities: 106
- Total injuries: 90

Aircraft
- Aircraft type: Lockheed C-130E Hercules
- Operator: Islamic Republic of Iran Air Force
- Registration: 5-8519
- Flight origin: Mehrabad International Airport, Tehran, Iran
- Destination: Bandar Abbas International Airport, Bandar Abbas, Iran
- Occupants: 94
- Passengers: 84
- Crew: 10
- Fatalities: 94
- Survivors: 0

Ground casualties
- Ground fatalities: 12
- Ground injuries: 90

On 6 December 2005 at 14:10 local time (10:40 UTC), a Lockheed C-130 Hercules four-engine military transport aircraft of the Islamic Republic of Iran Air Force, tail number 5-8519, crashed into a ten-story apartment building in a residential area of Tehran, the capital city of Iran.

== Accident ==
The aircraft, bound for Bandar Abbas on the Persian Gulf, was carrying 10 crew and 84 passengers, of whom 68 were reportedly journalists en route to watch a series of military exercises off the country's southern coast.

Shortly after takeoff, the pilot reported engine problems and unsuccessfully attempted to return to Mehrabad International Airport, from which the aircraft had departed. The aircraft came down in a densely populated suburb of Tehran, not far from the airport, crashing into an apartment building where many Iranian air force personnel and their families resided.

== Casualties ==
Initial reports varied, with Tehran mayor Mohammad Bagher Ghalibaf saying that all 94 people on board, including 40 journalists, were killed upon impact. Iranian State media reported a death toll of 128 victims, whilst Interior Ministry Spokesperson, Mojtaba Mir-Abdolahi, confirmed that 116 bodies were recovered from the site. However, an accident summary created by the Aviation Safety Network states that 106 people had died, comprising all 94 on board the aircraft, plus 12 on the ground.

The Mehr news agency reported that 40 journalists on board worked for the Islamic Republic of Iran Broadcasting, and the others were from the Islamic Republic News Agency, Iranian Students' News Agency and Fars News Agency, and several newspapers.

Iranian state radio reported that 90 people sustained serious injuries.

== Rescue operation ==
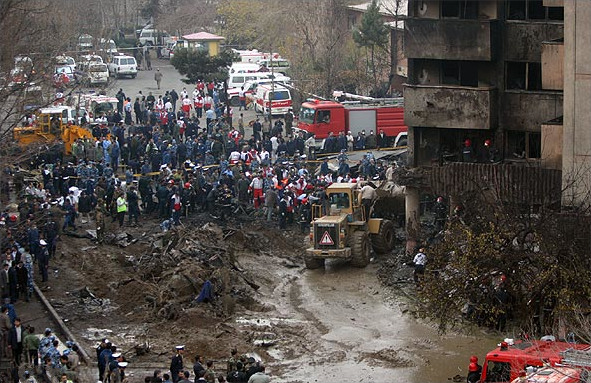
Site of the crash

Eyewitnesses, whose accounts were carried on the BBC World Service, stated that emergency crews arrived within three minutes of impact. SBS World News reported that riot police were called in to control onlookers who were blamed for blocking the access of emergency workers.

== Context ==
This crash was the deadliest aviation disaster in Iran since February 2003, when 275 people were killed when a military transport aircraft crashed in southern Iran. Due to U.S. sanctions, Iran has been unable to buy new Western aircraft (whether commercial or military) or spare parts for existing aircraft from U.S. manufacturers. American-built military planes now operating in Iran were purchased under the old regime during the 1970s. Iranian officials blamed the country's poor aviation record on the sanctions.

== See also ==
- Aviation accidents and incidents
- 1981 Iranian Air Force C-130 crash
