= Livingston Energy Flight =

Charter airline of Italy (2003–2010)

Livingston S.p.A.
IATA	ICAO	Call sign
LM	LVG	LIVINGSTON
- Founded: 13 January 2003
- Commenced operations: May 2003
- Ceased operations: 14 October 2010
- Operating bases: Milan Malpensa Airport
- Fleet size: 6
- Destinations: 55
- Parent company: Livingston Aviation Group
- Headquarters: Cardano al Campo, Varese
- Key people: Niki Lauda
- Website: lauda.it

Livingston S.p.A. was an Italian airline with headquarters in Cardano al Campo, Varese and the main operating base at Milan Malpensa Airport.

== History ==
=== Start with a merger ===
The airline was established on 13 January 2003 by Ventaglio Group, a powerful Italian operator controlling various tourism branches. It was in fact the successor of Lauda Air Italy which had been bought by the group. After a few months of reorganization it started operations in May 2003 under the brand Livingston Energy Flight, short/medium-haul charter flights, using a single Airbus A321-200. Three more aircraft of the same type were added in the following months.

In September 2005, the two air carriers merged: as a result, Livingston S.p.A. integrated the long-haul operations and fleet of Lauda Air Italia. In February 2009, Ventaglio Group sold Livingston S.p.A. to 4 Fly S.p.A., a new player in the Italian air transport panorama. In the following months, 4 Fly financially merged with Livingston and was then acquired by FG Holding. In October, the Meridie investment fund acquired 25% of the share capital of Livingston S.p.A. These financial alchemies actually concealed growing difficulties that had manifested themselves after the global financial crisis of 2008.

=== Signs of crisis and closure ===
On October 8, 2010, ENAC (Italian civil avition authority) ordered the suspension of the airline's Air Operator's Certificate (AOC), effective midnight on October 14, 2010, following the carrier's declared inability to continue operations. The Busto Arsizio court declared Livingston S.p.A. insolvent and initiated extraordinary administration proceedings on 4 November. The full effect of the suspension took place from midnight 14 October 2010. The airline never resumed operations.

On October 13, 2011, the Extraordinary Administration Supervisory Committee approved the sale of the airline's assets. On November 12, the Ministry of Economic Development authorized the transaction, allowing the creation of a new airline called Livingston (New Livingston S.p.A.). On June 12, 2014, FG Holding chairman Massimo Ferrero was sentenced to one year and ten months in prison for fraudulent bankruptcy, in addition to the payment of part of the debts arising from the bankruptcy of Livingston S.p.A. The funds misappropriated by Ferrero's company amounted to between 41 and 44 million €uros.

== Destinations ==
As of October 2008, Livingston operated scheduled and charter services connecting major Italian cities to holiday destinations in the Caribbean, Central America and South America, the Indian Ocean, Africa, the Mediterranean and the Middle East.

== Fleet ==
The Livingston fleet consisted of the following aircraft types:

Aircraft	Image	Total	Introduced	Retired	Remark
Airbus A321-200		4	2003	2011	
Airbus A330-200		3	2003	2010	
Boeing 737-800		2	2007	2008	leased from Malév Hungarian Airlines
Boeing 757-200		1	2005	2006	leased from Air Finland
Boeing 767-300		1	2003	2004	
