= Air Accident and Incident Investigation Board =

The Cyprus Aircraft Accident Incident Investigation Board (AAIIB) is an agency of the government of Cyprus, headquartered in Nicosia.

It is a part of the Ministry of Communications and Works and was established on 1 October 2003.
