= 2003 Iran Ilyushin Il-76 crash =

Aviation accident in Kerman, Iran

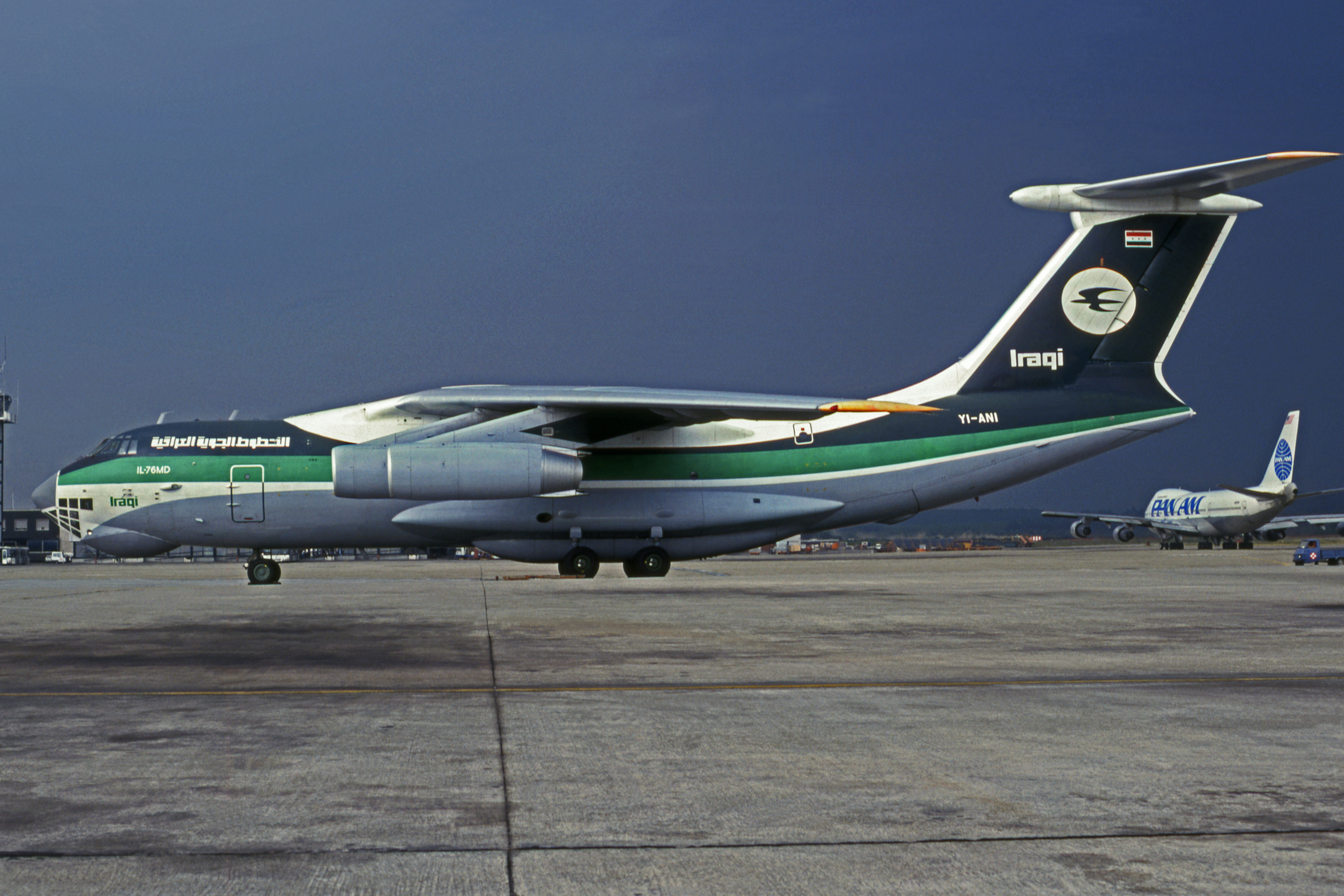
- The aircraft involved in the accident, when still in service with Iraqi Airways in 1990

Accident
- Date: 19 February 2003
- Summary: Controlled flight into terrain during descent in bad weather
- Site: 35 km (22 mi; 19 nmi) SE of Kerman Airport, Kerman, Iran

Aircraft
- Aircraft type: Ilyushin Il-76MD
- Operator: Aerospace Force of the Army of the Guardians of the Islamic Revolution
- Registration: 15-2280
- Flight origin: Zahedan Airport, Zahedan, Iran
- Destination: Kerman Airport, Kerman, Iran
- Occupants: 275
- Passengers: 257
- Crew: 18
- Fatalities: 275
- Survivors: 0

On 19 February 2003, an Ilyushin Il-76 crashed in mountainous terrain near Kerman in Iran. The Aerospace Force of the Islamic Revolutionary Guard Corps aircraft, registration 15-2280, was flying from Zahedan to Kerman when it crashed 35 kilometres (22 mi; 19 nmi) southeast of Kerman. The aircraft was carrying members of the Islamic Revolutionary Guard, a special force that is independent from the Iranian Army, on an unknown mission.

Strong winds were reported in the region of the crash when the aircraft disappeared from radar; around the same time, villagers in the area described hearing a loud explosion. There were no survivors among the 275 occupants on board the aircraft. As of 2026, the crash remains the second deadliest on Iranian soil (behind Iran Air Flight 655) and the deadliest crash of an Il-76.

== Background ==
The aircraft had the registration YI-AND and was 17 years old at the moment of the accident. The crew consisted on 42 year old Sardar Akbar Bigdali which had 7 hours of service at the moment of the accident (2 of which were on the Ilyushin Il-76), and co-pilot Sardar Mohammad Reza Tahanian, which had an unknown amount of Flight hours at the moment of the accident.

== Accident ==
Photo of the crash site of the aircraft.

The Il-76 was flying a route from Zahedan Airport to Kerman Airport carrying members of the Islamic Revolutionary Guard Corps to celebrate the Eid al-Adha holidays. At 17:44 the aircraft departed from Zahedan airport.

At 120 Nautical miles from the destination the crew started to inform about poor weather including strong Crosswind reported from a 250 direction. The Kerman ATC was informed about the situation of the aircraft before ATC was switched to Tehran ATC.

The aircraft was allowed by the Tehran’s ATC to fly at 19,000 feet even though the aircraft was supposed to be flying at 17,000. Then the ATC proceeded to inform the aircraft to fly through 16,000 feet until reaching the airport. Moments later, the four-engine Russian transport aircraft lost contact with air traffic control at approximately 18:25. Testimonies declared that there was a explosion around the same time the aircraft lost contact. The aircraft crashed into the Sirch mountains, southeast of Kerman, about 500 miles (430 nmi; 800 km) southeast of Tehran, killing all aboard.

== Recovery and aftermath ==
Immediately after the crash, members of the Revolutionary Guards and Red Crescent were sent to the accident scene. Two helicopters attempting to reach the scene turned back due to bad weather. A cordon of the area was completed as well, limiting access to journalists and the public.

President Mohammad Khatami's cabinet sent a message of condolence to families of the victims about the "tragic event in which a group of IRGC brothers"—Islamic Revolutionary Guards Corps—were killed. The Iranian government also blamed U.S. sanctions against Iran for playing a part in the crash since the restrictions make it more difficult for Iran to maintain its aircraft.

Investigators believe it was a controlled flight into terrain, citing the deteriorating weather conditions and high winds. There was speculation that the accident was the result of a mid-air collision due to the high number of fatalities (the Il-76 normally carries fewer than 200 passengers). A terrorist organization called the Abu-Bakr Brigades also claimed responsibility for the crash.

== See also ==
- 2005 Iranian Air Force C-130 crash
- 2018 Algerian Air Force Il-76 crash
- Charkhi Dadri mid-air collision, involving an Il-76 and a Boeing 747; and with a higher loss of life
