= Lauda Air Italy =

Charter airline of Italy (1990–2003)

Lauda Air S.p.A.
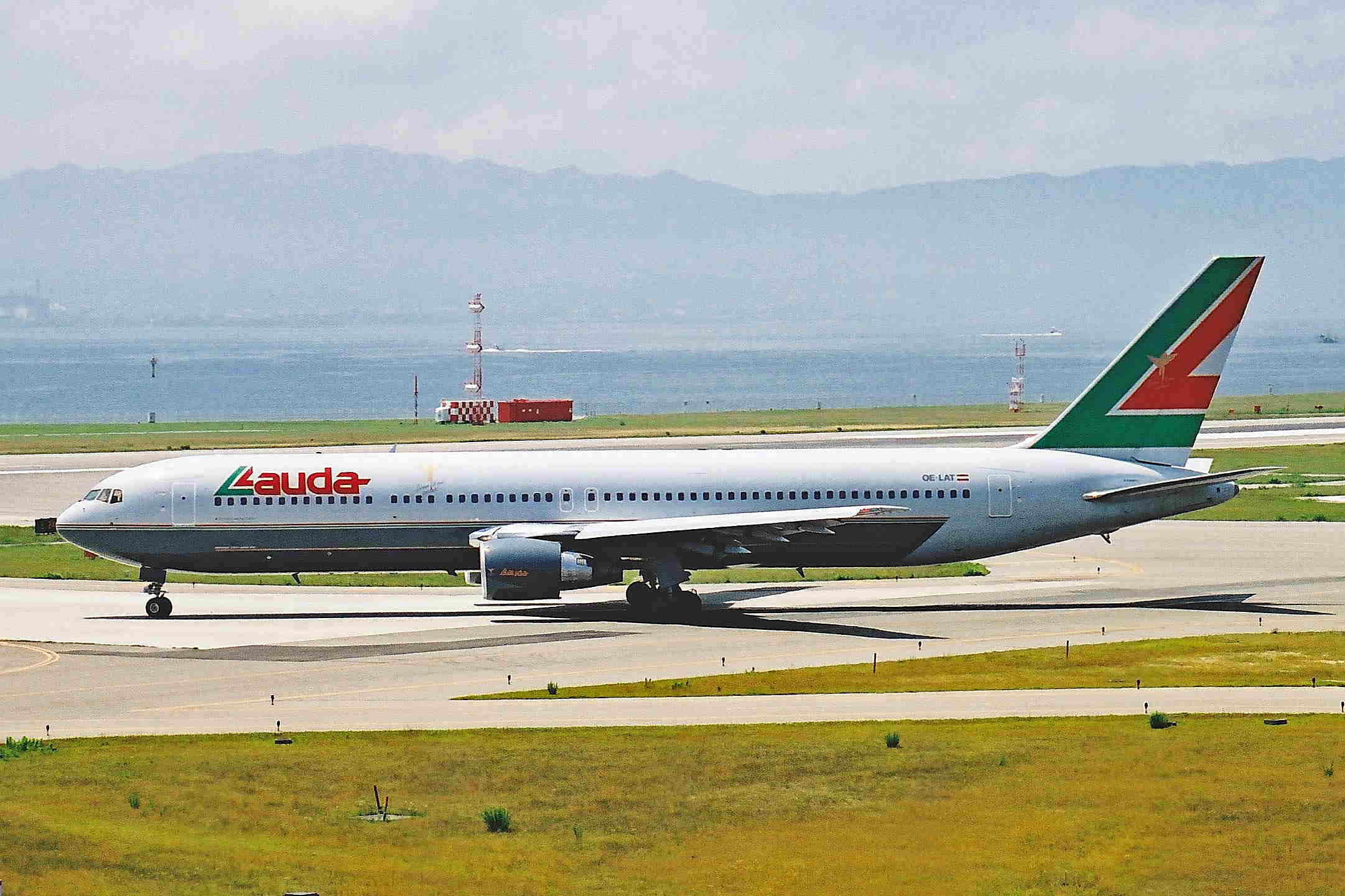
- Boeing 767-300ER
IATA	ICAO	Call sign
L4	LDI	LAUDA ITALY
- Founded: 1990
- Commenced operations: 1993
- Ceased operations: 2003 (merged into Livingston Energy Flight)
- Operating bases: Milan Malpensa Airport
- Frequent-flyer program: LaudaPoints
- Parent company: Lauda Air
- Headquarters: Milan, Italy
- Key people: Andrea Molinari (CEO)
- Founder: Niki Lauda

Lauda Air Italy, also known as Lauda Air Italia, was an Italian charter airline founded in September 1991 by ex F1 racing driver Niki Lauda, which passed under the control of the Livingston Aviation Group holding company in September 2005.

== History ==
Lauda Air Italia was founded in 1990, by former F1 champion Niki Lauda, as a subsidiary of the Austrian sister airline Lauda Air. The air carrier began operations in 1993 with a Boeing 767-300ER, later increasing the fleet to four aircraft. It operated mainly long-haul charter flights to the Caribbeans (Mexico, Dominican Republic, Jamaica and Cuba), Africa (Kenya and Tanzania) and the Indian Ocean (Maldives), mainly out of Milan Malpensa Airport. During months of increased request from tour operators, short/medium-haul flights were also operated, mainly to the Red Sea and also to Ibiza.

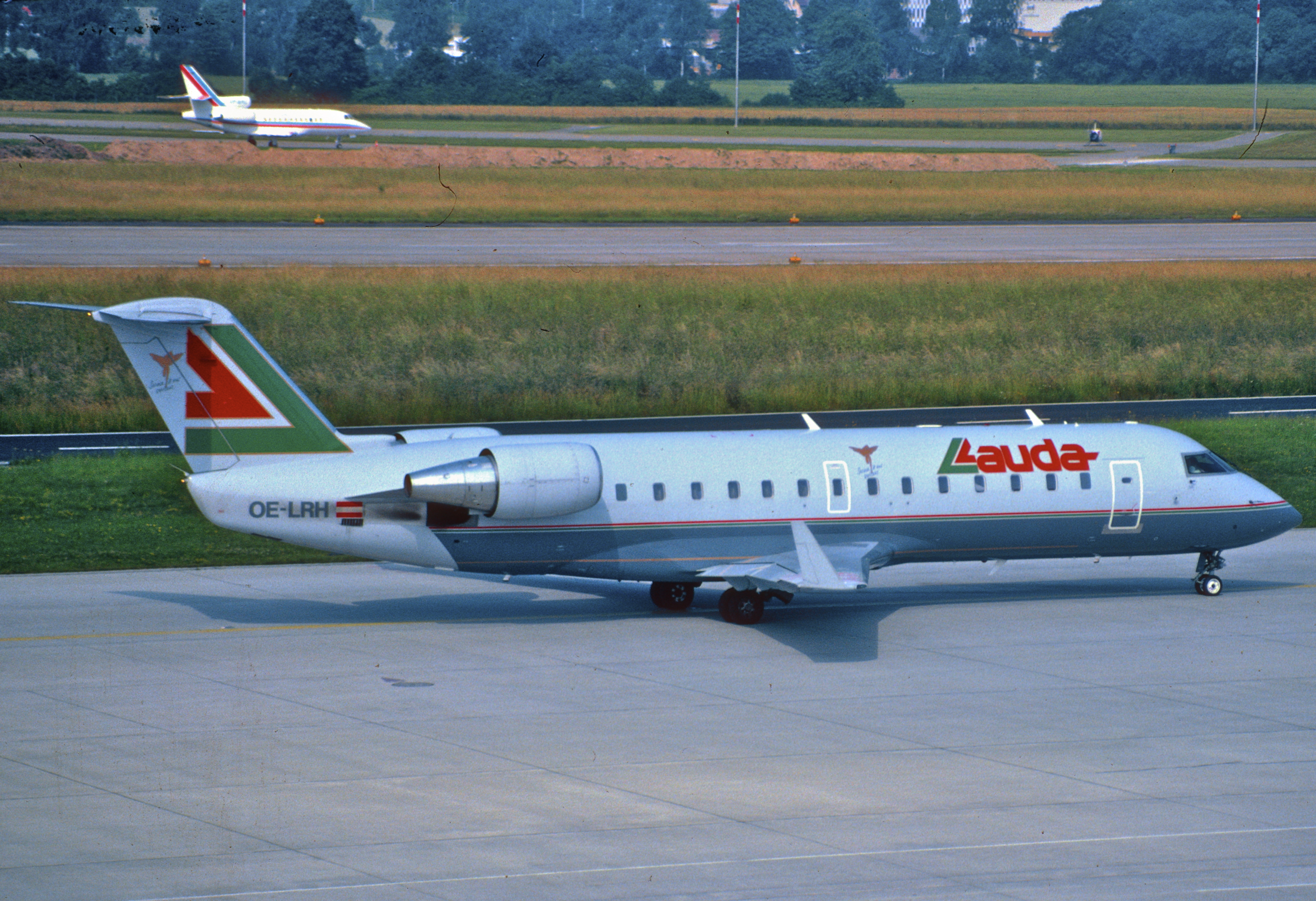
A Canadair CRJ100 in June 1999

In the late 1990s, it was deemed appropriate to add some scheduled regional flights. A pair of Canadair CRJ100s were moved from Austria to Italy for this purpose. The initiative met with limited success and ended in 2001.

In 2003, Lauda Air Italia was purchased by the Ventaglio Group, a powerful Italian operator in various sectors of tourism; as a result, the then newly established Livingston Energy Flight (Livingston S.p.A.) airline obtained from Austrian Airlines Group the right to continue using the Lauda brand for longer time. In these years Airbus A330-200s aircraft appeared in the fleet. By 2005 Lauda Air Italia had been totally integrated into Livingston Aviation Group.

== Fleet ==
The airline operated the following aircraft:

Aircraft	Total	Introduced	Retired	Refs
Airbus A330-200	3	2003	2004	
Boeing 767-300ER	6	1995	2004	
Canadair CRJ100	2	1999	2001	
Learjet 60	1	2002	2004	

=== Logo and livery ===
The livery consisted of a white fuselage on the upper part and a gray one on the lower part. A double line of red and green separated the two halves. The stylized L of the logo featured the same colors, reminiscent of the Italian flag (tricolour).
