= 5th FAI World Rally Flying Championship =

5th FAI World Rally Flying Championship took place between May 29 – June 1, 1986, in Castellón de la Plana in Spain.

There were 57 crews from 18 countries: Spain (5), West Germany (5), South Africa (5), Italy (5), Sweden (4), United Kingdom (4), Argentina (4), Poland (3), Luxembourg (3), France (3), the Netherlands (3), Chile (3), Denmark (3), Austria (2), Switzerland (2), Morocco (1), Venezuela (1), and Ireland (1).

== Results ==
=== Individual ===
#	Pilot / navigator	country	aircraft	penal points
1.	Krzysztof Lenartowicz / Janusz Darocha	POL	PZL-104 Wilga	61
2.	Carlos Eugui Aguado / Jose Anizonda	ESP	?	220
3./4.	Wacław Nycz / Marian Wieczorek	POL	PZL-104 Wilga	513
3./4.	Witold Świadek / Andrzej Korzeniowski	POL	PZL-104 Wilga	513
5.	Reinhard Ruck/?	DEU	?	563
6.	Husemann /?	DEU	?	645
7.	Gozdowski /?	DEU	?	835
8.	Gerold Detter / Schachinger (?)	AUT	?	886
9.	Janer /?	ESP	?	1827
10.	Christer Lundholm /?	SWE	?	1955

=== Team ===
Counted two best crews (number of penal points):

1. POL - 574
2. DEU - 1208
3. ESP - 2047
4. SWE - 5414
