= Ullmann 2000 Panther =

Panther

General information
- Type: Four-seat Homebuilt cabin monoplane
- National origin: United States
- Manufacturer: Ullmann Aircraft Company

History
- First flight: 29 March 2003

The Ullmann 2000 Panther is an American four-seat high-wing cabin monoplane designed by Ullmann Aircraft Company of Wichita, Kansas to be sold as kits for Amateur construction.

== Design and development ==
The design of the Panther began in 1997 with construction of the prototype starting in Jun 1998, this prototype registered N202KT first flew on 29 March 2003. The Panther is a high-wing cantilever monoplane with an all-metal wing and a steel-tube fuselage covered with aluminum sheet. The prototype is powered by a 300 hp (224 kW) Continental IO-550-L engine driving a three-bladed constant-speed tractor propeller. The Panther has a tricycle landing gear and an enclosed cabin for a pilot and three passengers, side-by-side in two rows, access by split doors on each side of the fuselage and a small baggage door.

== Specifications (Prototype) ==
Data from Jane's All the World's Aircraft 2003-2004

General characteristics

- Crew: 1
- Capacity: 3 passengers
- Length: 25 ft 10 in (7.87 m)
- Wingspan: 34 ft 3 in (10.44 m)
- Height: 9 ft 6 in (2.90 m)
- Wing area: 130.0 sq ft (12.08 m^{2})
- Empty weight: 2,040 lb (925 kg)
- Gross weight: 3,050 lb (1,383 kg)
- Powerplant: 1 × Continental IO-550-L , 300 hp (224 kW)

Performance

- Maximum speed: 287 mph (463 km/h, 249 kn)
- Cruise speed: 230 mph (370 km/h, 200 kn)
- Stall speed: 68 mph (110 km/h, 59 kn)
- Range: 1,412 mi (2,272 km, 1,227 nmi)
- g limits: +3.8/-1.52
