= VS-35 =

Sea Control Squadron 35
- Country: United States of America
- Branch: United States Navy
- Role: Anti-surface warfare
- Homeport: Naval Air Station North Island, San Diego, California
- Nickname(s): Boomerangers
- Aircraft: S2D Tracker S-3A Viking
- Engagements: Vietnam War Cold War

Sea Control Squadron 35 (VS-35), known as the Boomerangers was an anti-submarine/surface squadron of the United States Navy. Established on 3 January 1961, at Naval Air Station Los Alamitos, California, it was disestablished on 30 June 1973.

== History ==
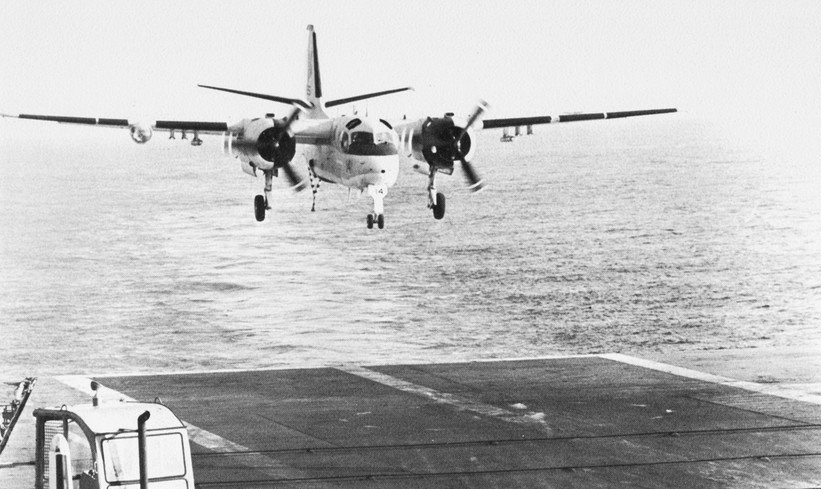
VS-35 S2D approaches USS Hornet c.1965

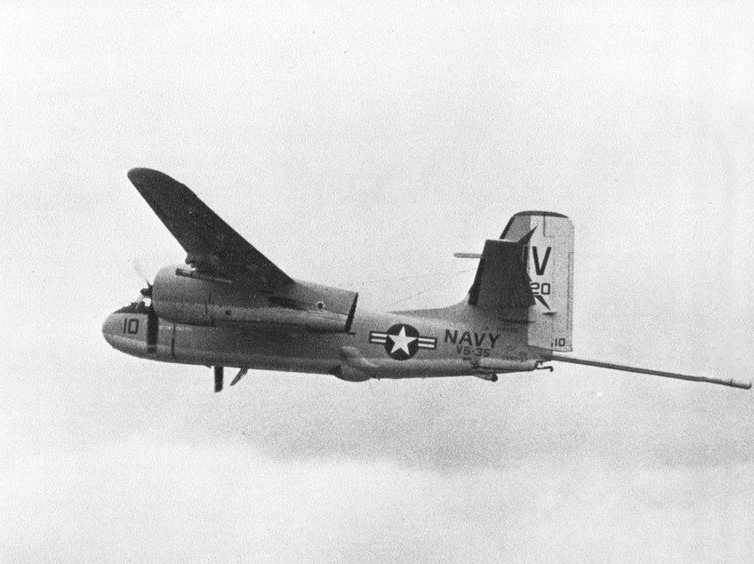
VS-35 S2D with Magnetic anomaly detector extended c.1966

On establishment the squadron was equipped with eleven S2F-1 Tracker aircraft. In July 1961, the squadron transition to the S2F-3, which would later be designated the S-2D. In 1962, the squadron was relocated to NAS North Island, California, and deployed for the first time as part of Carrier Anti-Submarine Air Group Fifty-Seven (CVSG-57) on board the USS Hornet and again in 1963.

From August 1965 to March 1966, the squadron again deployed aboard the USS Hornet for combat operations in Vietnam. The Boomerangers maintained surface and subsurface surveillance in the Gulf of Tonkin. Later that year, they assisted the Hornet in the recovery of the first Apollo capsule. The squadron's fourth and fifth deployments in 1967 and 1968–1969 saw them return to the Gulf of Tonkin for combat operations.

After their fifth deployment, the USS Hornet was decommissioned and VS-35 was reassigned as part of CVSG-53 and in May 1970 deployed in the Atlantic on the USS Wasp. On 17 May 1972, VS-35 deployed with CVSG-53 on board the USS Ticonderoga to the Pacific and participated in the Operation Pocket Money, the mining of Haiphong Harbor in North Vietnam. In May 1973, due to impending retirement of the Grumman Tracker, VS-35 was decommissioned on 30 June 1973. A plan to reestablish a second VS-35 occurred in October 1976 to fly the S-3A Viking. This however was stopped due to fiscal constraints and in 1977, the second VS-35 was disestablished.

== See also ==
- History of the United States Navy
- List of inactive United States Navy aircraft squadrons
- List of United States Navy aircraft squadrons
